= List of University of Michigan law and government alumni =

The parent article is at List of University of Michigan alumni

Academic unit key
Symbol	Academic unit
ARCH	Taubman College
BUS	Ross School of Business
COE	College of Engineering
DENT	School of Dentistry
GFSPP	Gerald R. Ford School of Public Policy
HHRS	Horace H. Rackham School of Graduate Studies
LAW	Law School
LSA	College of LS&A
MED	Medical School
SMTD	School of Music, Theatre and Dance
PHARM	School of Pharmacy
SED	School of Education
SNRE	School of Natural Resources
SOAD	The Stamps School of Art & Design
SOI	School of Information
SON	School of Nursing
SOK	School of Kinesiology
SOSW	School of Social Work
SPH	School of Public Health
MDNG	Matriculated, did not graduate

This is a partial list of notable alumni in law, government and public policy from the University of Michigan. Please refer also to the below list:

== Legislators ==
- Estefania Aldaba-Lim (Ph.D.), first female Filipino cabinet secretary; social services and development secretary 1971–1977; first Filipino clinical psychologist; president of the Girl Scouts of the Philippines; first woman to become special ambassador to the United Nations (1979); UN Peace Medal Award
- Justin Amash (B.A. 2002, J.D. 2005), lawyer, politician; U.S. Representative from Michigan's 3rd congressional district; libertarian-oriented maverick
- Andrea Barthwell (M.D. 1980), Deputy Director for Demand Reduction at the Office of National Drug Control Policy (Drug Czar); resigned in July 2004 with an interest in running for United States Senate from Illinois
- Alvin Morell Bentley (B.A. 1940, M.A. 1963), U.S. Representative from Michigan's 8th congressional district (1953–1961); wounded in the 1954 Capitol shooting incident; member of the Foreign Service
- William J. "Bill" Bogaard (J.D. 1965), mayor of Pasadena, California (1984–1986; 1999–present); longest-serving mayor in city history
- Lyman James Briggs (M.A. in Physics, 1895), civil servant for the U.S. Government for 49 years; headed the Briggs Advisory Committee on Uranium; namesake of Lyman Briggs College at MSU
- Arleigh Burke (MSE 1931), United States Navy admiral; World War II naval hero; served an unprecedented three terms as Chief of Naval Operations (1955–1961)
- Anson Burlingame (1838–1841), congressional representative from Massachusetts; attended Detroit branch of the University of Michigan; served in the state senate in 1852; elected as a candidate of the American Party to the Thirty-fourth Congress and as a Republican to the Thirty-fifth and Thirty-sixth Congresses (1855–1861)
- Charles W. Burson (B.A. in political science, 1966), senior professor of Practice at the Washington University School of Law; executive vice president, general counsel and secretary at Monsanto Company (2001–2006); Tennessee attorney general (1988–1997); chief of staff to Vice President Al Gore (1997–2001)
- Harry M. Daugherty (LL.B. 1881), United States attorney general; campaign manager and close advisor to Warren G. Harding
- Donald McDonald Dickinson (J.D. 1867), United States Postmaster General under Grover Cleveland
- Gerrit John Diekema (LAW: JD 1883), congressional representative from Michigan; member of the State house of representatives 1885–1891, serving as speaker in 1889; mayor of Holland in 1895; chairman of the Michigan Republican State central committee 1900–1910; delegate to the Republican National Convention in 1896
- Gerald R. Ford (B.A. 1935, HLLD 1974), 38th president of the United States (1974–1977); 40th vice president of the United States (1973–1974); minority leader of the United States House of Representatives (1965–1973); U.S. representative from Michigan's 5th congressional district (1949–1973)
- Harold Ford Jr. (J.D. 1996), U.S. representative from the Memphis-based Tennessee's 9th congressional district (1997–2007)
- Richard A. "Dick" Gephardt (J.D. 1965), president and CEO of the Gephardt Group lobbying firm; House minority leader (1995–2003); House majority leader (1989–1995); U.S. representative from Missouri's 3rd congressional district (1977–2005); St. Louis city alderman (1971–1976); unsuccessfully sought the Democratic nomination for president in 1988 and 2004
- Stephen Goldsmith (J.D.), professor of Practice at the Harvard Kennedy School of Government; chair of the Corporation for National and Community Service; Deputy Mayor of New York City (2010–11); mayor of Indianapolis (1992–1999); district attorney for Marion County, Indiana (1979–1990)
- Henry Thomas Hazard (LLD 1868), mayor of Los Angeles (1889–1892)
- Alexander W. Joel (J.D. 1987), Civil Liberties Protection Officer for the Office of the Director of National Intelligence
- Philip Lader (M.A. History 1967), U.S. ambassador to the United Kingdom (1997–2001); administrator of the Small Business Administration (1994–1997); House deputy chief of staff and deputy director for Management of the Office of Management and Budget (1993–1994)
- Robert Meeropol (1969, M.A. 1970), attorney; founder and executive director of the Rosenberg Fund for Children (1990–present); son of Julius and Ethel Rosenberg
- Julius Sterling Morton (A.B. 1854), United States secretary of agriculture under President Cleveland; created Arbor Day
- Edward Charles Pierce (BA 1955; MED: MD 1959), politician and physician; member of Michigan State Senate from the state's eighteenth district 1978–1982
- Lloyd Welch Pogue (LAW: JD 1926), "the nation's leading authority on civil aviation"; named assistant general counsel of the Civil Aeronautics Authority in 1938, then its general counsel and chief lawyer; in 1942, President Franklin Roosevelt named Welch to the Civil Aeronautics Board (now the FAA) and reappointed him chairman for four successive years.
- Harvey S. Rosen (A.B. 1970), chair of President Bush's Council of Economic Advisers; deputy assistant secretary for tax analysis in the Department of the Treasury under President George H.W. Bush 1989–1991
- Joe Schwarz (B.A. History 1959), Republican U.S. congressman, MI-7th (2005–2007); Michigan state senator (1987–2002)
- George Sutherland (LAW: 1883), associate justice of the Supreme Court
- Lauren Underwood (BS, Nursing 2008), Democratic U.S. congresswoman, IL-14 (Naperville/Chicago suburbs)
- Fred Upton (BA 1975), Republican U.S. congressman, MI-6th (southwest Michigan)
- Kapila Vatsyayan (MA), scholar of Indian classical dance; member of the Rajya Sabha in the Parliament of India (2006, 2007–present)
- James Franklin Ware (LAW: 1873), Wisconsin state assemblyman and senator

== Governors and lieutenant governors ==
As of 2021, Michigan has matriculated 63 governors and lieutenant governors.

=== Michigan ===
- Wilber Marion Brucker (A.B. 1916), 32nd governor of Michigan 1931–1933; United States secretary of the Army 1955–1961
- John Cherry (MPA 1984), lt. governor of Michigan; former state senator
- William Comstock (A.B. 1899), 33rd governor of Michigan
- Woodbridge N. Ferris (MD 1874), educator and politician; founder and president of the Ferris Industrial School (later Ferris State University); president of the Big Rapids Savings Bank; governor of Michigan (1913–1916); elected as a Democrat to the United States Senate in 1922 and served from 1923 until his death in 1928
- Garlin Gilchrist II (born 1982), current lieutenant governor of Michigan
- Fred W. Green (LAW: 1898), mayor of Ionia, Michigan before he served as the 31st governor of Michigan 1927–1931
- Martha Wright Griffiths (LAW: JD 1940), congressional representative; elected to the Michigan state house of representatives 1948–1952; elected as a Democrat to the Eighty-fourth and to the nine succeeding Congresses (1955–1974); lieutenant governor of Michigan 1982–1991
- George Griswold, tenth lieutenant governor of Michigan
- Alex Groesbeck (LAW: LLB 1893), 30th governor of Michigan
- Patrick Henry Kelley (LAW: JD 1900), congressional representative from Michigan; member of the state board of education 1901–1905; state superintendent of public instruction 1905–1907; lieutenant governor of Michigan 1907–1911; elected as a Republican to the Sixty-third and to the four succeeding Congresses (1913–1923)
- Dwight May, 18th lieutenant governor of Michigan, trustee of the village of Kalamazoo
- Joseph R. McLaughlin, entrepreneur and politician from Michigan; lieutenant governor 1895–1897
- Kimber Cornellus "Kim" Sigler, 40th governor of Michigan 1947–1949
- Rick Snyder (LSA, LAW, BUS), 48th governor of Michigan; former president and COO of Gateway Computers
- Murray Delos Van Wagoner (COE: BA CE 1921), 38th governor of Michigan 1941–1942
- G. Mennen "Soapy" Williams (LAW: JD), six-term Democratic governor of Michigan (1948–1960); Michigan Supreme Court chief justice
- Edwin B. Winans (LAW), U.S. representative; 22nd governor of Michigan

=== Outside Michigan ===
- Thomas Burton Adams Jr., Democratic Florida politician; served in the Florida Senate (1956–1960), as secretary of state of Florida (1961–1971), and tenth lieutenant governor of Florida (1971–1975)
- George Ariyoshi (J.D. 1952), third governor of Hawaii (1974–1986)
- Theodore G. Bilbo, twice served as governor of Mississippi (1916–20, 1928–32); later a U.S. senator (1935–47).
- William John Bulow (LAW: JD 1893), senator from South Dakota; member of State Senate 1899; mayor of Beresford 1912–1913; county judge of Union County, 1918; governor of South Dakota 1927–1931; elected as a Democrat to the United States Senate in 1930; reelected in 1936 and served 1931–1943; chairman of Committee on the Civil Service (Seventy-third through Seventy-seventh Congresses)
- David Francis Cargo (BA 1951, MA 1953; LAW: LLB 1957), governor of New Mexico, 1967–71; New Mexico State House of Representatives Albuquerque (1963–67)
- Fenimore Chatterton, Republican, governor of Wyoming (1903–1905)
- Chase Addison Clark, Democrat, governor of Idaho (1941–1943)
- Thomas Cuming (A.B. 1845) military officer; first secretary of Nebraska Territory; twice the territory's acting governor, after the death of Francis Burt and after the resignation of Mark W. Izard
- Cushman Kellogg Davis (AB 1857), governor of Minnesota (1874–1876); U.S. senator (1887–1900)
- Thomas E. Dewey (B.A. 1923), governor of New York (1943–1954); unsuccessfully ran as Republican nominee for president in 1944 and 1948
- Frank Emerson (B.S. 1904), governor of Wyoming (1927–1931)
- Ralph F. Gates (BA 1915; LAW: JD 1917), governor of Indiana, 1945–49
- John L. Gibbs, Minnesota legislator, two-time speaker of the Minnesota House of Representatives and the 14th lieutenant governor of Minnesota
- Joseph B. Gill, lieutenant governor of Illinois (1893–1897)
- Morley Isaac Griswold, Republican governor of Nevada (1934–1935)
- Philip Hart, lawyer and politician
- Paul M. Herbert, Republican, served three separate tenures as the 47th, 49th and 52nd lieutenant governor of Ohio
- Francis Grant "Frank" Higgins, first native-born person from Montana to become a member of the state's bar and of its legislature; served in the Montana House of Representatives; mayor of Missoula, Montana in 1892; fourth lieutenant governor of Montana, 1901–1905
- Lyman Underwood Humphrey, Republican, governor of Kansas (1889–1893)
- Arthur Mastick Hyde, Republican, governor of Missouri (1921–1925)
- John N. Irwin, businessman; diplomat; mayor of Keokuk, Iowa; governor of Idaho Territory; governor of Arizona Territory; U.S. minister to Portugal
- Gideon S. Ives, served as mayor of St. Peter, Minnesota; Minnesota state senator; and 11th lieutenant governor of Minnesota
- Clement Field Kimball (LAW), lieutenant governor of Iowa 1925–1928
- Elbert L. Lampson, 21st lieutenant governor of Ohio; former state senator
- Washington Ellsworth Lindsey, Republican, governor of New Mexico (1917–1919)
- Oren Ethelbirt Long (AB 1916), senator from Hawaii; secretary of Territory of Hawaii 1946–1951; appointed governor of Territory of Hawaii 1951–1953; territorial senator, Territory of Hawaii 1956–1959; elected as a Democrat to the United States Senate on July 28, 1959; upon the admission of Hawaii as a State into the Union on August 21, 1959
- Ernest Whitworth Marland (LAW: JD 1893), congressional representative from Oklahoma; elected as a Democrat to the Seventy-third Congress (1933–1935); elected governor of Oklahoma in 1934
- George de Rue Meiklejohn (LAW: JD 1880), congressional representative from Nebraska; member of the State senate 1884–1888 and served as its president 1886–1888; lieutenant governor of Nebraska 1889–1891; elected as a Republican to the Fifty-third and Fifty-fourth Congresses (1893–1897); assistant secretary of war 1897–1901
- Julius Sterling Morton, secretary of Nebraska Territory 1858–1861; acting governor of Nebraska 1858–1859
- Culbert Olson, lawyer; Democratic Party member; governor of California (1939–1943)
- Walter Marcus Pierce (MDNG), congressional representative from Oregon; served in the Oregon senate 1903–1907 and 1917–1921; governor of Oregon 1923–1927; elected as a Democrat to the Seventy-third and the four succeeding Congresses (1933–1943)
- Ridgley C. Powers, governor of Mississippi (1871–1874)
- Donald Stuart Russell, Democrat, governor of South Carolina (1963–1965)
- John Franklin Shafroth, governor of Colorado (1909–1913)
- Robert Theodore Stafford (AB), congressional representative and senator from Vermont; deputy state attorney general 1953–1955; state attorney general 1955–1957; lieutenant governor 1957–1959; governor of Vermont 1959–1961; elected as a Republican to the Eighty-seventh Congress in 1960; reelected to the five succeeding Congresses
- William Story, federal judge; seventh lieutenant governor of Colorado, serving 1891–1893 under John Long Routt
- Charles Spalding Thomas (LAW: JD 1871), senator from Colorado; member of the Democratic National Committee 1884–1896; governor of Colorado 1899–1901
- Harriett Woods (AB 1949), Missouri's first female lieutenant governor; a Democrat; Missouri's lieutenant governor in 1984 and served one term as the state's No. 2 executive; previously served eight years in the state Senate
- Richard Yates, Republican governor of Illinois (1901–1905)

== Local government ==
- Saul Anuzis, Republican Party leader from Michigan; national chairman of the Save American Jobs Project on the American Solutions team; chairman of the Michigan Republican Party 2005–2009; candidate for national chairman of the Republican National Committee in 2009
- Henry Bodenstab, Wisconsin state senator (1909–1912)
- Carol A. Buettner, Wisconsin state senator (1987–1991)
- Rufus Davis, mayor of Camilla, Georgia (2016–)
- Mike Duggan, incumbent mayor of Detroit, Michigan (2013–)
- Craig Greenberg, businessman, lawyer, and politician; mayor of Louisville (2023–)
- Wade Kapszukiewicz, 58th mayor of Toledo, Ohio (2018–)
- John McMullen, Wisconsin state senator (1895–1898)
- H.H.C. Miller (A.B. 1868, A.M. 1871), mayor of Evanston (1883–1891)
- Robert E. Minahan, mayor of Green Bay, Wisconsin (1904–1907)
- John M. Potter, Wisconsin state senator (1960–1964)
- Laura Spurr, chairwoman of the Nottawaseppi Huron Band of Potawatomi (2000–2001, 2003–2010)
- Dwight Tillery, mayor of Cincinnati, Ohio (1991–1993)

== Ambassadors ==
As of 2022, Michigan has matriculated 64 smbassadors who served in more than 72 countries.

- H. Gardner Ackley (MA, PhD), former Henry Carter Adams Distinguished University Professor Emeritus of Political Economy; on U-M faculty for 43 years; leader in national economic affairs for several decades, including serving as adviser to Presidents Kennedy and Johnson; an expert on the Italian economy, he was also ambassador to Italy
- Robert Worth Bingham, newspaper publisher and U.S. ambassador to Great Britain
- Donald Blome, diplomat U.S. ambassador to Tunisia; graduate of the University of Michigan as well as of its law school; nominated in 2021 to serve as ambassador to Pakistan
- Paul H. Boeker (MA Economics), U.S. ambassador to Jordan (1984–87); director of Foreign Service Institute (1980–83); U.S. ambassador to Bolivia (1977–80)
- Anson Burlingame, U.S. ambassador to China (1861–70)
- Lawrence E. Butler (BUS: MBA), U.S. ambassador to Macedonia (2002–05); UN official principal deputy high representative in Bosnia-Herzegovina (2005–present); U.S. ambassador to Macedonia (2002–05); US National Security Council Staff, director of European Affairs (1997–99); U.S. ambassador to Serbia ad interim (1995–96); US State Department deputy chief of Mission, Belgrade, Serbia-Montenegro (−1995); US State Department Deputy Chief of Mission, Copenhagen, Denmark (past); US State Department Deputy Chief of Mission, Dublin, Ireland (past)
- William I. Cargo (B.A. Class of 1933), appointed U.S. ambassador to Nepal in 1973
- Vicente Blanco Gaspar, ambassador of Spain
- Luis CdeBaca (J.D. 1993), ambassador-at-large to Monitor and Combat Trafficking in Persons at the United States Department of State; lead trial counsel in the largest slavery prosecution in U.S. history
- Brutus J. Clay II (COE: 1868), appointed Minister to Switzerland in 1905, served–1910
- E. William Crotty (J.D.), ambassador to Barbados, Antigua and Barbuda, the Commonwealth of Dominica, Grenada, St. Kitts and Nevis, Saint Lucia, St. Vincent and the Grenadines
- Gerrit J. Diekema (LAW), appointed United States minister to the Netherlands by President Herbert Hoover in 1929, and served until his death in the Hague, Netherlands
- Robert F. Ellsworth (J.D. 1949), U.S. representative from Kansas (1961–1969); United States Permanent Representative to NATO (1969–1971)
- Brian James Proetel Fall, Britain's ambassador to Russia (1992–95)
- Homer S. Ferguson (B.A. 1913), judge of the United States Court of Military Appeals (1956–1971); U.S. ambassador to the Philippines (1955–1956); judge of the United States Court of Military Appeals at Washington, D.C., 1956–1971; U.S. Ssnator from Michigan (1943–1955); circuit judge of the circuit court for Wayne County, Michigan (1929–1942)
- Robert E. Fritts (B.A.) In 1974 at age 39, he became the then-youngest ambassador in the history of the Foreign Service when assigned to Rwanda, a record he wryly recalled "lasted about six months"; later served as the U.S. ambassador to Ghana
- John Godfrey (M.A.), nominee for ambassador extraordinary and plenipotentiary to the Republic of the Sudan
- James Goodby (MDNG: 1951–1952), U.S. ambassador to Finland (1980–1981)
- David Hermelin (BUS: BBA 1958), entrepreneur; philanthropist; former U.S. ambassador to Norway; Ross School benefactor
- Pete Hoekstra (MBA), Dutch-American politician who served as the United States ambassador to the Netherlands 2018–2021
- Aubrey Hooks (MA 1984), U.S. ambassador to Côte d'Ivoire
- John Nichol Irwin, businessman; politician; diplomat; mayor of Keokuk, Iowa; governor of Idaho Territory; governor of Arizona Territory; U.S. minister to Portugal
- Susan S. Jacobs, former U.S. ambassador to Papua New Guinea, the Solomon Islands and Vanuatu
- Richard Kauzlarich (MA), U.S. ambassador to Azerbaijan 1994–1997 and Bosnia and Herzegovina 1997–1999
- Leo J. Keena, appointed by President Franklin D. Roosevelt and served as the U.S. ambassador to Honduras 1935–1937; U.S. ambassador to South Africa 1937–1942
- W. Robert Kohorst (J.D.), U.S. ambassador extraordinary and plenipotentiary to the Republic of Croatia
- Philip Lader (LSA: MA), U.S. ambassador to the United Kingdom 1997–2001
- Melvyn Levitsky (BA), retired career minister in the U.S. Foreign Service; teaches international relations at the University of Michigan's Gerald R. Ford School of Public Policy; senior fellow of the School's International Policy Center; had 35-year career as a U.S. diplomat, ambassador to Brazil 1994–98
- María Dora Victoriana Mejía Marulanda (B.A., M.A.), ambassador of Colombia to Sweden
- Fenton R. McCreery, ambassador to Honduras
- Douglas L. McElhaney (BA International Affairs), U.S. ambassador to Bosnia-Herzegovina 2004–present; entered the Foreign Service in 1975
- Joseph R. McLaughlin, entrepreneur; politician; lieutenant governor of Michigan 1895–1897
- William Bryant Milam (MA 1970), U.S. ambassador to Pakistan, 1998–2001
- Earl R. Miller, U.S. ambassador to Botswana 2014–
- Thomas J. Miller (PhD 1975), U.S. ambassador to Greece; U.S. ambassador to Bosnia-Herzegovina
- José Teodoro Moscoso Mora (B.A. 1932), named Moscoso ambassador to Venezuela by President Kennedy in 1961
- Robert G. Neumann (Ph.D. 1946), former United States ambassador to Afghanistan 1969–73; director, Institute for the Study of Diplomacy, Georgetown University (1976–81); U.S. ambassador to Saudi Arabia (1981), U.S. ambassador to Morocco (1973–76)
- David George Newton (MA 1970), U.S. ambassador to Iraq, 1984–88
- Thomas J. O'Brien (LAW), ambassador to Denmark, Japan and Italy
- Susan D. Page (A.B.), U.S. ambassador to South Sudan 2011–
- Thomas W. Palmer, appointed U.S. minister to Spain in 1889 by President Benjamin Harrison; served 1889–1890
- Mark A. Pekala (A.B. 1981), U.S. ambassador to Latvia in 2012
- Nancy Bikoff Pettit (M.A.), ambassador to the Republic of Latvia, career member of the Foreign Service
- William E. Quinby, newspaper publisher; diplomat; U.S. ambassador to the Netherlands
- Clark T. Randt, Jr. (LAW: JD 1975), U.S. ambassador to China, 2001–2009
- Kenneth Salazar, ambassador to Mexico 2021–
- Joseph C. Satterthwaite (B.A. M.A.), United States ambassador to Sri Lanka 1949–1952, head of the U.S. Legation at Tangier 1953–1955, and as U.S. ambassador to Burma 1955–1957
- Margaret Scobey (Ph.D.), U.S. ambassador to Syria; U.S. ambassador to Egypt as of 2008
- Marshall D. Shulman (A.B. 1937), principal architect of Columbia University's Russian studies program; longest serving director of the Russian Institute at Columbia; ambassador as the principal adviser on Soviet matters to Secretary of State Cyrus R. Vance in the Carter administration; speechwriter for Secretary of State Dean G. Acheson; author of Stalin's Foreign Policy Reappraised (1963), a staple in Soviet studies for many years; his 1966 book of lectures, Beyond the Cold War, foreshadowed the détente between the Soviet Union and the US that occurred during the Nixon administration
- William Graves Sharp (LAW: JD 1881), congressional representative from Ohio; elected as a Democrat to the Sixty-first, Sixty-second, and Sixty-third Congresses; served 1909–1914, when he resigned to become ambassador to France, serving until 1919
- William Story, federal judge; seventh lieutenant governor of Colorado, serving 1891–1893 under John Long Routt
- Louis B. Susman (A.B.), former vice chairman of Citigroup Capital Markets; nominated as ambassador to Great Britain in 2009
- Edwin Uhl, acting US secretary of state and ambassador to Germany during the Cleveland administration
- Jack Hood Vaughn (BA, MA), second director of the United States Peace Corps; ambassador to Colombia and Panama
- Howard Kent Walker, diplomat; foreign service officer; former U.S. ambassador to Togo, Madagascar, and Comoros
- Charles B. Warren (B.A. 1891), U.S. ambassador to Japan 1921–1922; ambassador to Mexico in 1924
- Ronald N. Weiser (BUS: BBA 1966), U.S. ambassador to Slovak Republic; founder of McKinley Associates
- G. Mennen Williams (J.D.), ambassador to the Philippines; heir to a personal grooming products fortune, he was known as "Soapy"
- Susan L. Ziadeh (Ph.D.), deputy assistant secretary of state for Arabian Peninsula Affairs in the Bureau of Near Eastern Affairs (2014–2016); acting principal deputy assistant secretary; U.S. ambassador to Qatar 2011–2014

== Federal Reserve, FDIC, OCC, and treasury ==
- William Duscharme "Pink Cheeks" Cochran, director of the Federal Reserve Bank of Minneapolis 1936–1950, including five years as deputy chairman, 1946–1950
- John C. Dugan (A.B. 1977), 29th comptroller of the Currency as of 2005
- Howard Flight (BUS: MBA), British MP; holds 11 directorships; in 2001, he was appointed shadow paymaster general; in 2002 was promoted to shadow chief secretary to the treasury
- Andrea Gacki (BA, JD), director of the Financial Crimes Enforcement Network (FinCEN)
- G. Edward Griffin (BA, 1953), author of The Creature from Jekyll Island (1994), which promotes conspiracy theories about the Federal Reserve System; also writes about the health care system
- George M. Humphrey (BA, JD), United States Secretary of the Treasury during the Eisenhower administration
- Donald Kohn (Ph.D. 1971), joined the Federal Reserve System in 1970; member of Board of Governors since 2002, vice-chairman 2006–2010
- Robb LaKritz (B.A. 1994), special assistant and advisor to the Deputy U.S. Treasury Secretary, appointed by President George W. Bush
- Rob Portman (LAW: JD 1984), former United States Trade Representative, a post carrying the rank of Ambassador; nominated by President Bush and confirmed by the US Senate in 2006, as the Director of the United States Office of Management and Budget; Senator elect from Ohio in 2010
- L. William Seidman (BUS: MBA 1949, former head of the FDIC; vice chairman and CFO of the Phelps Dodge Corporation (1977–1982); managing partner of Seidman & Seidman, certified public accountants (1968–1974)
- Daniel Tarullo (LAW: JD 1977), member of the Board of Governors, U.S. Federal Reserve Board; appointed by President Obama in 2009; former Assistant to President Clinton for International Economic Policy and Deputy Assistant for Economic Policy
- Nancy Teeters (1930–2014), first woman to serve on the Federal Reserve Board of Governors, 1978–1984

== Judiciary ==
- J. Leroy Adair (LAW: JD 1911), congressional representative from Illinois; member of the State senate 1928–1932; elected as a Democrat to the Seventy-third and Seventy-fourth Congresses (1933–1937); appointed United States district judge for the southern district of Illinois in 1937 by President Franklin D. Roosevelt and served until his death in 1956
- Charles H. Aldrich (A.B. 1875), the Solicitor General of the United States
- George G. Bingham (LLB 1880), judge in Oregon, dean of Willamette University College of Law
- Brian Blanchard (BA 1980), judge of the Wisconsin Court of Appeals
- Jackson Burton Chase (LAW: LLB 1913), congressional representative from Nebraska; assistant attorney general of Nebraska in 1921 and 1922; member of the State House of Representatives in 1933 and 1934; served as a major, Judge Advocate General's Department, 1942–1945; chairman of Nebraska Liquor Control Commission in 1945 and 1946; judge of the fourth judicial district court of Nebraska, 1946–1954; elected as a Republican to the Eighty-fourth Congress (1955–1957); again elected judge of the fourth judicial district court of Nebraska 1956–1960
- John Logan Chipman (1843–1845), congressional representative from Michigan; attorney of the police board of Detroit 1867–1879; elected judge of the superior court of Detroit 1879; reelected in 1885 and served until 1887, when he resigned, having been elected to Congress; elected as a Democrat to the Fiftieth and to the three succeeding Congresses; served from 1887 until his death in 1893
- George Pierre Codd (AB 1891), congressional representative from Michigan; mayor of Detroit in 1905 and 1906; circuit judge of Wayne County 1911–1921; regent of the University of Michigan in 1910 and 1911; elected as a Republican to the Sixty-seventh Congress (1921–1923); again elected circuit judge of Wayne County in 1924 and served until his death in 1927
- Avern Cohn (LAW: JD 1949), district judge for the United States District Court, Eastern District of Michigan, appointed by President Jimmy Carter in 1979
- Louis Convers Cramton (LAW: JD 1899), congressional representative from Michigan; law clerk of the State senate three terms; deputy commissioner of railroads of Michigan in 1907; secretary of the Michigan Railroad Commission from September 1907 to January 1, 1909; member of the State house of representatives in 1909 and 1910; elected as a Republican to the Sixty-third and to the eight succeeding Congresses (1913–1931); circuit judge of the fortieth judicial circuit 1934–1941
- Shepard J. Crumpacker, Jr. (LAW: JD 1941), congressional representative from Indiana; elected as a Republican to the Eighty-second, Eighty-third, and Eighty-fourth Congresses (1951–1957); appointed judge of the St. Joseph Superior Court and served 1977–1985
- Marc Dann (B.A. 1984), 47th attorney general of Ohio
- Harry Micajah Daugherty (LAW: LL.B), Ohio Republican political insider; attorney general of the United States under Presidents Harding and Coolidge
- Robert Emory Evans (LAW: JD 1886), congressional representative from Nebraska; prosecuting attorney of Dakota County in 1895; resigned to become judge of the eighth judicial district, in which capacity he served from 1895 to 1899; president of the Nebraska State Bar Association in 1919; elected as a Republican to the Sixty-sixth and Sixty-seventh Congresses (1919–1923); elected judge of the supreme court from the third district of Nebraska in 1924
- Homer Samuel Ferguson (AB 1913), senator from Michigan; circuit judge of the circuit court for Wayne County, 1929–1942; elected as a Republican to the United States Senate in 1942; reelected in 1948 and served 1943–1955; Ambassador to the Philippines 1955–1956; judge of the United States Court of Military Appeals at Washington, D.C., 1956–1971
- George Ford (LAW: JD 1869), congressional representative from Indiana; elected as a Democrat to the Forty-ninth Congress (1885–1887); elected judge of the superior court of St. Joseph County in 1914
- Ralph M. Freeman (LAW: LL.B. 1926), judge in the U.S. District Court for the Eastern District of Michigan; nominated by President Dwight D. Eisenhower in 1954; chief judge 1967–1972; assumed senior status in 1973
- Ronald M. Gould (LAW: 1973), federal appeals judge; has served on the Ninth Circuit Court of Appeals since 1999; nominated by President Bill Clinton, confirmed by the United States Senate on November 17, and received his commission on November 22
- Barzillai Gray (AB: 1845), judge
- Byron Berry Harlan (LAW: JD 1909; LS&A: 1911), congressional representative from Ohio; elected as a Democrat to the Seventy-second and to the three succeeding Congresses (1931–1939); chairman, Committee on Revision of the Laws (Seventy-second and Seventy-third Congresses); appointed judge of the Tax Court of the United States in 1946 to his death in 1949
- James Harvey (LAW: LLB 1948), congressional representative from Michigan; elected as a Republican to the Eighty-seventh and to the six succeeding Congresses (1961–1974); appointed by President Richard Nixon as a United States District Court judge for the Eastern District, Michigan, 1974–1984; United States Senior District judge, 1984–2002
- Guy Tresillian Helvering (LAW: JD 1906), congressional representative from Kansas; elected as a Democrat to the Sixty-third, Sixty-fourth, and Sixty-fifth Congresses (1913–1919); Democratic State chairman 1930–1934; mayor of Salina from February 15, 1926, until his resignation on December 8, 1930; State highway director in 1931 and 1932; appointed Commissioner of Internal Revenue by President Franklin D. Roosevelt in 1933 and served until his appointment as a federal district judge for Kansas in 1943, in which capacity he was serving at the time of his death in 1946
- Douglas Woodruff Hillman (LAW: JD 1948), practiced law in Grand Rapids for 30 years before President Carter appointed him to the federal court in 1979; retired from the bench in 2002
- Jay Abel Hubbell (AB 1853), congressional representative from Michigan; prosecuting attorney of Houghton County 1861–1867; elected as a Republican to the Forty-third and to the four succeeding Congresses (1873–1883); chairman, Committee on Expenditures in the Department of the Interior (Forty-seventh Congress); member of the State senate 1885–1887; served as circuit judge of the twelfth judicial circuit from 1894 to 1899, when he resigned
- William Leonard Hungate (MDNG), congressional representative from Missouri; special assistant attorney general 1958–1964; elected simultaneously as a Democrat to the Eighty-eighth and to the Eighty-ninth Congress by special election, to fill the vacancy caused by the death of United States Representative Clarence Cannon, and reelected to the five succeeding Congresses (1964–1977); professor, University of Missouri, St. Louis, 1977–1979; justice, United States district judge for the eastern district of Missouri, 1979–1992; president, American Bar Association's National Conference of Federal Trial Judges, 1985–1986
- Edwin William Keightley (LAW: JD 1865), congressional representative from Michigan; judge of the fifteenth judicial circuit of Michigan 1876–1877; elected as a Republican to the Forty-fifth Congress (1877–1879); third auditor of the United States Treasury Department 1879–1885
- Moses Pierce Kinkaid (LAW: JD 1876), congressional representative from Nebraska; member of the State senate in 1883; district judge 1887–1900; elected as a Republican to the Fifty-eighth and to the nine succeeding Congresses and served from 1903 until his death in 1922; chairman, Committee on Irrigation of Arid Lands (Sixty-sixth and Sixty-seventh Congresses)
- Carolyn N. Lerner (born 1965), lawyer from Washington, D.C., judge-designate of the United States Court of Federal Claims
- William Lewis (MDNG), congressional representative from Kentucky; studied law at the University of Kentucky at Lexington and at U-M; member of State House of Representatives in 1900 and 1901; Commonwealth attorney 1904–1909; circuit judge of the twenty-seventh judicial district of Kentucky 1909–1922 and 1928–1934; elected as a Republican to the Eightieth Congress to fill the vacancy caused by the death of John Marshall Robsion and served 1948–1949
- Gordon Myse (LAW: LLB 1960), judge of the Wisconsin Court of Appeals
- James Carson Needham (LAW: JD 1889), congressional representative from California; elected as a Republican to the Fifty-sixth and to the six succeeding Congresses (1899–1913); appointed judge of the superior court of California in 1919; elected to the same office in 1920 to fill an unexpired term; reelected in 1922 and again in 1926, and served until 1935
- Darleen Ortega (LAW: JD 1989), judge on the Oregon Court of Appeals
- Samuel Ritter Peters (LAW: JD 1867), congressional representative from Kansas; mayor of Memphis in 1873; member of the State senate 1874–1875; judge of the ninth judicial district 1875–1883; elected as a Republican to the Forty-eighth and to the three succeeding Congresses (1883–1891); postmaster of Newton 1898–1910; editor of the Newton Daily Kansan-Republican in 1899
- Rosemary S. Pooler (LAW: JD), U.S. federal judge; appointed in 1990 as a Justice for the Fifth Judicial District Supreme Court; appointed to the federal bench by President Bill Clinton, serving 1994–1998 as federal district judge in the Northern District of New York; received her current appointment as a Judge on the United States Court of Appeals for the Second Circuit in 1998
- Joseph Very Quarles (AB 1966; LAW: JD 1867), senator from Wisconsin; mayor of Kenosha 1876; member of state assembly 1879; member of state senate 1880–1882; elected as a Republican to the United States Senate and served 1899–1905; chairman, Committee on Transportation Routes to the Seaboard (Fifty-sixth Congress), Committee on the Census (Fifty-seventh and Fifty-eighth Congresses); appointed United States district judge for the eastern district of Wisconsin by President Theodore Roosevelt in 1905, and served until his death in 1911
- Ozora P. Stearns (AB 1858, LAW: JD 1860), senator from Minnesota; mayor of Rochester 1866–1868; served in the Union Army during the Civil War as a lieutenant, and then colonel; elected as a Republican to the United States Senate in 1871 and served until 1871; judge of the eleventh judicial district of Minnesota 1874–1895; regent of the University of Minnesota at Minneapolis 1890–1895
- Carl May Weideman (MDNG), congressional representative from Michigan; attended the public schools and the University of Michigan at Ann Arbor from 1914 until the outbreak of the First World War; delegate to the Democratic state conventions 1932–1944 and to the Democratic National Convention in 1940; elected as a Democrat to the Seventy-third Congress (19331935); circuit judge for the third judicial circuit of Michigan 1950–1968

=== Justices: Appeals and circuit courts ===
More than 75 Michigan alumni have served on appeals or circuit courts.

- G. Gordon Atcheson (BA), judge of the Kansas Court of Appeals
- Francis E. Baker (BA), senior Judge of the United States District Court for the District of Arizona of the United States Court of Appeals for the Seventh Circuit
- Jane M. Beckering (BA), judge of the 3rd District of the Michigan Court of Appeals
- Corinne A. Beckwith (LAW), associate judge of the District of Columbia Court of Appeals
- Richard Bilby (LAW), senior judge of the United States District Court for the District of Arizona
- Bruce D. Black (LAW), judge on the New Mexico Court of Appeals from 1991 to 1995
- Brian Blanchard (BA), judge of the Wisconsin Court of Appeals District IV
- Bruce Bromley (BA), appointed by Governor Thomas E. Dewey to the New York Court of Appeals
- Bailey Brown (AB), senior judge of the United States Court of Appeals for the Sixth Circuit
- John Robert Brown (LAW), senior judge of the United States Court of Appeals for the Fifth Circuit
- Tovah R. Calderon (BA), District of Columbia Court of Appeals
- Thomas Cane (BBA), Wisconsin Circuit Court Judge from 1972 until his appointment to the Court of Appeals in 1981; presiding judge 1984–1998
- John Emmett Carland (BA), judge of the United States Court of Appeals for the Eighth Circuit
- Lester LeFevre Cecil (LAW), senior judge of the United States Court of Appeals for the Sixth Circuit
- Margaret Chutich (LAW), associate judge of the Minnesota Court of Appeals
- Leroy John Contie Jr. (LAW), senior judge of the United States Court of Appeals for the Sixth Circuit
- John Hazelton Cotteral (BA), judge of the United States Court of Appeals for the Tenth Circuit
- Sean Cox (BGS), judge of the United States District Court for the Eastern District of Michigan
- Robert Danhof (LAW), appointed in 1969 to the Michigan Court of Appeals and served as chief judge
- William R. Day (BS), judge of the United States Court of Appeals for the Sixth Circuit
- Pat DeWine (LAW), won a seat on the 1st District Ohio District Courts of Appeals in 2012
- Joshua Deahl (LAW), associate judge of the District of Columbia Court of Appeals
- Rebecca Duncan (LAW), served on the Oregon Court of Appeals 2010–2017
- David M. Ebel (LAW), senior judge of the United States Court of Appeals for the Tenth Circuit
- Harry T. Edwards (LAW), senior judge of the United States Court of Appeals for the District of Columbia Circuit
- Albert J. Engel Jr. (LAW), senior judge of the United States Court of Appeals for the Sixth Circuit
- Homer S. Ferguson (LAW), judge of the United States Court of Appeals for the Armed Forces
- John Warner Fitzgerald (LAW), practiced in the law firm of Fitzgerald & Wirbel until he was elected to the Michigan Court of Appeals in 1964
- William Ball Gilbert (LAW), judge of the United States Court of Appeals for the Ninth Circuit
- Ronald M. Gould (LAW), judge of the United States Court of Appeals for the Ninth Circuit
- Roger Gregory (LAW), chief judge of the United States Court of Appeals for the Fourth Circuit
- Richard Allen Griffin (LAW), judge of the United States Court of Appeals for the Sixth Circuit
- Ralph B. Guy Jr. (LAW), presiding judge of the United States Foreign Intelligence Surveillance Court of Review
- Amalya Lyle Kearse (LAW), senior judge of the United States Court of Appeals for the Second Circuit
- Cornelia Groefsema Kennedy (LAW), senior judge of the United States Court of Appeals for the Sixth Circuit
- Shiro Kashiwa (LAW), judge of the United States Court of Appeals for the Federal Circuit
- W. Wallace Kent (LAW), judge of the United States Court of Appeals for the Sixth Circuit
- Raymond Kethledge (LAW), judge of the United States Court of Appeals for the Sixth Circuit
- Noël A. Kramer (LAW), associate judge of the District of Columbia Court of Appeals
- Amy Ronanye Krause (BA), judge of the Michigan Court of appeals 4th District
- Charles Levin (LAW), judge of the Michigan Court of Appeals
- Thomas Francis McAllister (LAW), senior judge of the United States Court of Appeals for the Sixth Circuit
- Susan Bieke Neilson (AB), nominated to a Michigan seat on the United States Court of Appeals for the Sixth Circuit
- Helen W. Nies (LAW), senior judge of the United States Court of Appeals for the Federal Circuit
- David McKeague (LAW), senior judge of the United States Court of Appeals for the Sixth Circuit
- Wilbur Kingsbury Miller (BA), senior judge of the United States Court of Appeals for the District of Columbia Circuit
- Gordon Myse (LAW), judge of the Wisconsin Court of Appeals
- Susan Bieke Neilson (AB), judge of the United States Court of Appeals for the Sixth Circuit
- Stewart Albert Newblatt (LAW), judge of the Seventh Judicial Circuit of Michigan 1962–1970
- Elliott Northcott (LAW), senior judge of the United States Court of Appeals for the Fourth Circuit
- Richard Lowell Nygaard (LAW), judge of the United States Court of Appeals for the Third Circuit
- Darleen Ortega (LAW), judge on the Oregon Court of Appeals
- Orie Leon Phillips (LAW), senior judge of the United States Court of Appeals for the Tenth Circuit
- Cecil F. Poole (LAW), senior judge of the United States Court of Appeals for the Ninth Circuit
- Rosemary S. Pooler (LAW), judge of the United States Court of Appeals for the Second Circuit
- Chad Readler (LAW), senior judge of the United States Court of Appeals for the Sixth Circuit
- Albert L. Rendlen (LAW)Judge Rendlen was a judge on the Missouri Court of Appeals for the Eastern District
- Henry Wade Rogers (BA, MA), judge of the United States Court of Appeals for the Second Circuit
- John M. Rogers (LAW), senior judge of the United States Court of Appeals for the Sixth Circuit
- Gilbert M. Roman (LAW), judge of the Colorado Court of Appeals
- Anthony Joseph Scirica (LAW), senior judge of the United States Court of Appeals for the Third Circuit
- Susan Segal (LAW), chief judge of the Minnesota Court of Appeals
- Charles Casper Simons (LAW), senior judge of the United States Court of Appeals for the Sixth Circuit
- Deanell Reece Tacha (LAW), senior judge of the United States Court of Appeals for the Tenth Circuit
- David S. Tatel (LAW), judge of the United States Court of Appeals for the District of Columbia Circuit
- Arba Seymour Van Valkenburgh (AB), senior judge of the United States Court of Appeals for the Eighth Circuit
- Melissa L. Tatum (LAW), member of the Navajo Nation's Rules Harmonization Project, co-authoring a report on Navajo Nation Proceedings and Outside Review, judge on the Southwest Intertribal Court of Appeals 1999–2006
- Kurtis T. Wilder (LAW), judge on Michigan First District Court of Appeals
- Ann Claire Williams (MA), senior judge of the United States Court of Appeals for the Seventh Circuit
- John M. Walker Jr. (LAW), senior judge of the United States Court of Appeals for the Second Circuit
- Elizabeth Kronk Warner (LAW), appellate judge in Michigan for the Sault Ste. Marie Tribe of Chippewa Indians Court of Appeals
- J. Walter Yeagley (JD), senior judge of the District of Columbia Court of Appeals

=== Justices: District courts ===
As of 2021, 71 Michigan alumni have served on district courts. 16 have served as chief justice.

- Cathy Ann Bencivengo (JD), judge of the United States District Court for the Southern District of California*Richard Bilby (LAW), chief judge of the United States District Court for the District of Arizona
- Jane M. Beckering (born 1965), judge of the 3rd District of the Michigan Court of Appeals, United States District judge–designate of the United States District Court for the Western District of Michigan
- Paul D. Borman (LAW), judge of the United States District Court for the Eastern District of Michigan
- Clarence Addison Brimmer, Jr. (LAW), chief judge of the United States District Court for the District of Wyoming
- Leonie Brinkema (MDNG), judge of the United States District Court for the Eastern District of Virginia
- Paul G. Byron (A.B.), judge of the United States District Court for the Middle District of Florida
- Aileen Cannon (LAW), judge of the United States District Court for the Southern District of Florida
- John Emmett Carland (A.B.), judge of the United States District Court for the District of South Dakota
- Edmond Chang (BSE), judge of the United States District Court for the Northern District of Illinois
- Pamela K. Chen (B.A.), judge of the United States District Court for the Eastern District of New York
- James Paul Churchill (LAW), chief judge of the United States District Court for the Eastern District of Michigan; senior judge of the United States District Court for the Eastern District of Michigan
- Chase A. Clark (MDNG) on US District Court for the District of Idaho, chief judge 1954–1964
- Avern Cohn (LAW), senior judge of the United States District Court for the Eastern District of Michigan
- Sean Cox (B.G.S.), judge of the United States District Court for the Eastern District of Michigan
- John Davies (B.A.), judge of the United States District Court for the Central District of California
- J. Mac Davis (LAW), chief judge of the 3rd District of Wisconsin Circuit Courts
- William Louis Day (LAW), judge of the United States District Court for the Northern District of Ohio
- Ann Donnelly (B.A.), judge of the United States District Court for the Eastern District of New York
- Gershwin A. Drain (LAW), judge of the United States District Court for the Eastern District of Michigan
- Gregory Kent Frizzell (LAW), chief judge of the United States District Court for the Northern District of Oklahoma
- Sarah Geraghty (born 1974), lawyer from Georgia who serves as senior counsel for the Southern Center for Human Rights. She is a nominee to be a United States District Judge of the United States District Court for the Northern District of Georgia.
- Mark A. Goldsmith (B.A.), judge of the United States District Court for the Eastern District of Michigan
- Ralph B. Guy Jr. (LAW), judge of the United States District Court for the Eastern District of Michigan
- R. James Harvey (LAW), senior judge of the United States District Court for the Eastern District of Michigan
- Jeffrey James Helmick (B.A.), judge of the United States District Court for the Northern District of Ohio
- Guy T. Helvering (LAW), judge of the United States District Court for the District of Kansas
- H. Russel Holland (LAW), senior judge of the United States District Court for the District of Alaska
- Marilyn L. Huff (LAW), senior judge of the United States District Court for the Southern District of California
- Carol E. Jackson (LAW), chief judge of the United States District Court for the Eastern District of Missouri
- Hala Y. Jarbou (B.B.A.), judge of the United States District Court for the Western District of Michigan
- Ralph E. Jenney (LAW), judge of the United States District Court for the Southern District of California
- Paul Jones (LAW), chief judge of the United States District Court for the Northern District of Ohio
- Robert James Jonker (LAW), chief judge of the United States District Court for the Western District of Michigan
- Cornelia Groefsema Kennedy (LAW), chief judge of the United States District Court for the Eastern District of Michigan
- Shalina D. Kumar (born 1971), attorney and jurist from Michigan who is a United States District Judge–Designate of the United States District Court for the Eastern District of Michigan.
- Hector LaSalle (LAW), presiding justice of the New York State Supreme Court, Appellate Division, Second Department
- Judith Ellen Levy (LAW), judge of the United States District Court for the Eastern District of Michigan
- Sheryl H. Lipman (B.A.), judge of the United States District Court for the Western District of Tennessee
- Joe Billy McDade (LAW), chief judge of the United States District Court for the Central District of Illinois
- Howard D. McKibben (LAW), senior judge of the United States District Court for the District of Nevada
- Glenn Everell Mencer (LAW), senior judge of the United States District Court for the Western District of Pennsylvania
- Laurie J. Michelson (A.B.), judge of the United States District Court for the Eastern District of Michigan
- Frank Montalvo (M.S.), judge of the United States District Court for the Western District of Texas
- James Byron Moran (1930–2009), district judge of the United States District Court for the Northern District of Illinois
- Stewart Albert Newblatt (LAW), senior judge of the United States District Court for the Eastern District of Michigan
- John Albert Nordberg (LAW), senior judge of the United States District Court for the Northern District of Illinois
- Linda Vivienne Parker (BA), judge of the United States District Court for the Eastern District of Michigan
- Rosemary S. Pooler (LAW), judge of the United States District Court for the Northern District of New York
- John William Potter (LAW), senior judge of the United States District Court for the Northern District of Ohio
- Nicholas Ranjan (LAW), judge of the United States District Court for the Western District of Pennsylvania
- Victoria A. Roberts (B.A.), senior judge of the United States District Court for the Eastern District of Michigan
- Jennifer L. Rochon, nominee for judge of the United States District Court for the Southern District of New York
- Stephen John Roth (LAW), judge of the United States District Court for the Eastern District of Michigan
- Mary M. Rowland (B.A.), judge of the United States District Court for the Northern District of Illinois
- Anthony Joseph Scirica (LAW), judge of the United States District Court for the Eastern District of Michigan
- Shira Scheindlin (B.A.), senior judge of the United States District Court for the Southern District of New York
- Steven C. Seeger (LAW), judge of the United States District Court for the Northern District of Illinois
- Norma Levy Shapiro (B.A.), senior judge of the United States District Court for the Eastern District of Pennsylvania
- Charles Casper Simons (LAW), chief judge of the United States Court of Appeals for the Sixth Circuit
- Raymond Wesley Starr (LAW), senior judge of the United States District Court for the Western District of Michigan
- George Caram Steeh III (LAW), senior judge of the United States District Court for the Eastern District of Michigan
- Joseph Edward Stevens Jr. (LAW), chief judge of the United States District Court for the Western District of Missouri
- William Story (A.B.), judge of the United States District Court for the Western District of Arkansas
- Cyrus Nils Tavares (LAW), senior judge of the United States District Court for the District of Hawaii
- Frank Gordon Theis (LAW), chief judge of the United States District Court for the District of Kansas
- Nancy Torresen (LAW), chief judge of the United States District Court for the District of Maine
- Arba Seymour Van Valkenburgh (A.B.), judge of the United States District Court for the Western District of Missouri
- John M. Walker Jr. (LAW), chief judge of the United States Court of Appeals for the Second Circuit
- Ann Claire Williams (M.A.), judge of the United States District Court for the Northern District of Illinois
- Thomas Samuel Zilly (BA), senior judge of the United States District Court for the Western District of Washington

=== National supreme court justices ===
- Irene Cortes (LL.M, S.J.D.), associate justice of the Supreme Court of the Philippines 1987–1990; first female dean of the University of the Philippines College of Law
- Jaime Sifre Dávila (LAW) (1887–1960), attorney and judge in Puerto Rico, associate justice and briefly chief justice of the Supreme Court of Puerto Rico
- George A. Malcolm (LAW: JD 1906), associate justice of the Supreme Court of the Philippines 1917–1936; founder of the University of the Philippines College of Law
- David Mills (LAW: LLB 1867), puisne justice of the Supreme Court of Canada; served as Minister of the Interior in the Cabinet of Alexander Mackenzie 1876–1878; appointed to the Supreme Court of Canada in 1902 and served for one year until his death in 1903; published The Present and Future Political Aspects of Canada in 1860 and The Blunders of the Dominion Government in Connection with the North-West Territory in 1871
- Frank Murphy, associate justice of the Supreme Court of the United States
- Pieter Jacobus Rabie (1917–1997), senior South African judge during the apartheid era, and its chief justice 1982–1989
- Florenz Regalado, associate justice of the Supreme Court of the Philippines 1988–1998; received his Master of Laws degree from the University of Michigan in 1963
- Maria Lourdes "Meilou" Aranal Sereno (LLM) (Tagalog: [sɛˈrɛnɔ], born Maria Lourdes Punzalan Aranal; 1960), Filipina lawyer and judge; de facto chief justice of the Supreme Court of the Philippines 2012–2018
- George Sutherland, United States Supreme Court

=== State supreme court justices ===
As of 2019, Michigan has placed onto various state supreme courts over 125 graduates, 40 of whom served as chief justice.

==== Michigan Supreme Court justices ====
===== Michigan Law School alumni =====
Michigan law has placed 36 of its graduates on the state's supreme court. 16 served as chief justice.

- Clark J. Adams (LAW): 1927; on court: 1952–1953)
- Paul L. Adams (LAW: 1936; on court: 1962–1962 and 1964–1972)
- Emerson R. Boyles (LAW): 1903; on court: 1940–1956)
- Henry M. Butzel (LAW: 1892; on court: 1929–1955), served as chief justice in 1939
- William Leland Carpenter (LAW: 1878; on court: 1902–1904)
- Leland W. Carr (LAW: 1906; on court: 1941–1963), served as chief justice
- John R. Dethmers (LAW: 1927; on court: 1946–1970), served as chief justice
- Louis H. Fead (LAW: 1900; on court: 1928–1937), served as chief justice
- John W. Fitzgerald (LAW: 1954; on court: 1974–1982), served as chief justice
- Richard C. Flannigan (LAW), jurist and lawyer, served as chief justice
- Claudius B. Grant (A.B.), jurist, legislator, and lawyer, served as chief justice
- Robert P. Griffin (LAW: 1950; on court: 1987–1994)
- Frank A. Hooker (LAW: 1865; on court: 1893–1907), served as chief justice during three separate periods
- Franz C. Kuhn (LAW: 1894; on court: 1912–1919)
- Charles Leonard Levin (LAW: 1947; on court: 1973–1996)
- Lawrence B. Lindemer (LAW: 1948; on court: 1975–1976)
- Isaac Marston (LAW: 1861; on court: 1875–1883), served as chief justice
- Thomas F. McAllister (LAW: 1921; on court: 1938–1941)
- Aaron Vance McAlvay (LAW: 1869; on court: 1905–1915)
- John W. McGrath (LAW: 1868; on court: 1891–1895), served as chief justice
- Blair Moody (LAW: 1952; on court: 1977–1982)
- Joseph B. Moore, studied for 1 year at Michigan Law (on court: 1896–1926), served as chief justice over several periods
- Walter Harper North (LAW: 1899; on court: 1927–1952), chief Justice
- Russell C. Ostrander (LAW: 1876; on court: 1905–1919), chief justice
- William W. Potter (LAW: 1895; on court: 1928–1940), served as chief justice
- Talbot Smith (LAW: 1934; on court: 1955–1961)
- Ernest A. Snow (LAW: 1896; on court: 1926–1927)
- Theodore Souris (LAW: 1949; on court: 1960–1968)
- Joseph H. Steere (LAW), jurist, chief justice
- Raymond Wesley Starr (LAW: 1910; on court: 1941–1946), attorney general of Michigan 1937–1938
- David Viviano (LAW: 1996; on court: 2013–present)
- John D. Voelker (LAW: 1928; on court: 1957–1959)
- Thomas Addis Emmett Weadock (LAW: 1873; on court: 1933–1933)
- G. Mennen Williams (LAW: 1936; on court: 1971–1986), chief justice

===== Alumni of other Michigan schools =====
Michigan Supreme Court justices from other University of Michigan schools:

- Richard H. Bernstein (B.A.), lawyer and Michigan Supreme Court justice
- Charles A. Blair (B.A.) (1854–1912), member of the Michigan Supreme Court 1905–1912
- Megan Cavanagh (B.E.), attorney who was elected in November 2018 to become an associate justice of the Michigan Supreme Court with a term beginning in January 2019
- Mary Beth Kelly (BA), justice of the Michigan Supreme Court, elected in November 2010
- Charles Leonard Levin (BA: 1946, LLB:1947), jurist; Michigan Court of Appeals judge 1966–1972; justice of the Michigan Supreme Court 1973–1996
- Rollin H. Person (LLB), studied law at University of Michigan Law School; admitted to the Michigan bar in 1873; Michigan circuit court judge 1891–1899; served on the Michigan Supreme Court 1915–1917
- Clifford Taylor (BA), chief justice of the Michigan Supreme Court 2005–2009; appointed in 1997 by Republican Gov. John Engler; re-elected in 2000 to serve an eight-year term; first chosen by the justices to serve as chief justice in 2004; in 1992, Gov. Engler appointed him to the Michigan Court of Appeals where he served until his appointment to the Michigan Supreme Court; co-author of Michigan Practice Guide on Torts
- Kurtis T. Wilder (AB, JD), attended the University Michigan, graduating in 1981 with a A.B. degree in political science, and earned his Juris Doctor from the University of Michigan Law School in 1984; appointed Wilder to the Michigan Supreme Court in 2017

==== Illinois Supreme Court justices ====
- Joseph N. Carter (LLB), candidate for the Supreme Court of Illinois to fill the vacancy of Simeon P. Shope; youngest member of the court upon his election; served one term as chief justice 1898–1899
- James H. Cartwright (MDNG), went to Mount Morris Seminary and University of Michigan; served on the Illinois Supreme Court 1895–1924
- William G. Clark (MDNG), elected to the Illinois Supreme Court and served until 1992; chief justice of the Illinois Supreme Court 1985–1988
- Lott R. Herrick (JD 1894), lawyer and jurist. Herrick graduated from the University of Michigan Law School in 1894;k served on the Illinois Supreme Court 1933–1937
- Loren E. Murphy (LLB: 1906), served on the Illinois Supreme Court; chief justice 1939–1948
- Elwyn Riley Shaw (LLB: 1910), judge on the Supreme Court of Illinois 1933–1942; chief justice 1938–1939

==== Indiana Supreme Court justices ====
- Timothy Edward Howard (MDNG), served 2,191 days in office on the state of Indiana Supreme Court
- Isadore Levine (BA, JD), justice of the Supreme Court of Indiana from January 13, 1955, to May 23, 1955. He then received a B.A. from the University of Michigan in 1920, and a J.D. from the University of Michigan Law School in 1921.
- Myra C. Selby (JD), appointed to the Indiana Supreme Court in 1995, where she served as both the first African American and first woman appointed to the highest state court in Indiana.
- Oliver Starr (LLB: 1908), justice of the Supreme Court of Indiana 1945–1951
- Allen Zollars (LLB), politician and judge in Indiana; justice of the Supreme Court of Indiana 1883–1889

==== Ohio Supreme Court justices ====
- Herbert R. Brown (JD), lawyer and author from the U.S. State of Ohio who sat on the Ohio Supreme Court for six years, then devoted his time to writing fiction.
- Robert H. Day, attended the University of Michigan for two years and graduated from the Cincinnati Law School in 1891. On November 9, 1922, was elected to the Ohio Supreme Court, and was seated January 1, 1923. He was re-elected in November 1928 for another 6-year term. He served until his death in Columbus, Ohio September 29, 1933.
- Richard Patrick "Pat" DeWine, American lawyer and an associate justice of the Ohio Supreme Court.
- William C. Dixon, government antitrust lawyer who had a two-month term as a Justice of the Ohio Supreme Court in 1938.
- David Dudley Dowd Jr. (JD), received a Juris Doctor from the University of Michigan Law School in 1954. He was a Justice of the Ohio Supreme Court 1980–1981; in private practice in Canton, Ohio 1981–1982
- William L. Hart (LLB), lawyer in the U.S. State of Ohio who served as a justice of the Supreme Court of Ohio. He taught law at university, and was president of the Ohio State Bar Association.
- Paul M. Herbert (BA), served as a justice of the Ohio Supreme Court from 1963 to 1969.
- John Allen Shauck (LLB), Republican politician in the U.S. State of Ohio who was an Ohio Supreme Court judge 1895–1914
- Roy Hughes Williams (JD), lawyer from the U.S. State of Ohio who served as a prosecutor, local and appellate judge, and was a justice of the Supreme Court of Ohio from 1934 until his death

==== Other state supreme courts ====
- Kazuhisa Abe (LAW) (1914–1996), Democratic state senator and Justice of the Supreme Court of Hawaii.
- Francis E. Baker (B.A.: 1882) (1860–1924), U.S. federal judge
- William H. Barnes (LLB), assistant justice on the Arizona Territorial Supreme Court 1885–1889
- Charles C. Black (LLB: 1881), associate justice of the New Jersey Supreme Court; Democratic nominee for governor of New Jersey in 1904
- Charles Blakey Blackmar (J.D.), judge of the Supreme Court of Missouri 1982–1992; chief justice of the court 1989–1991
- Dario Borghesan, American lawyer from Alaska who is an associate justice of the Alaska Supreme Court.
- Charles D. Breitel (B.A.) In 1950, Dewey appointed him a justice of the New York Supreme Court to fill the vacancy caused by the death of Samuel Null. In December 1950, Dewey re-appointed Breitel to the Supreme Court to fill the vacancy caused by the resignation of Ferdinand Pecora. In November 1951, he was elected on the Republican and Democratic tickets to a 14-year term, and re-elected in 1965.
- Rousseau Angelus Burch, associate justice of the Kansas Supreme Court from September 29, 1902, to July 1, 1935, then chief justice of the Kansas Supreme Court July 1, 1935 to January 11, 1937.
- Charles C. Butler, justice and chief justice of the Colorado Supreme Court
- John Emmett Carland, U.S. federal judge. Carland attended the University of Michigan, and read law in 1877 to enter the Bar. He was the U.S. Attorney for the Dakota Territory from 1885 to 1888, and a Justice of the Dakota territorial Supreme Court in 1888 and 1889.
- Margaret Chutich (JD), lawyer and judge, who has served as an associate justice of the Minnesota Supreme Court since 2016, when she was appointed by Governor Mark Dayton.
- Robert N. Clinton is an American constitutional lawyer, and law professor at the Arizona State University Sandra Day O'Connor College of Law, sits on numerous native-American tribal appellate courts; chief justice of the Winnebago Supreme Court
- Nathaniel P. Conrey (LLB), associate justice of the Supreme Court of California from October 1, 1935, to November 2, 1936. His 36 years on the bench place him among the longest serving judges in California history.
- Jesse W. Curtis Sr. (LLB), attorney who served as an associate justice of the Supreme Court of California 1926–1945
- Jaime Sifre Dávila (JD), attorney and judge in Puerto Rico, associate justice and briefly chief justice of the Supreme Court of Puerto Rico
- James R. Dean (LLB), justice of the Nebraska Supreme Court 1909–1910 and 1917–1935
- Wallace B. Douglas (J.D.) (1852–1930), lawyer, jurist, and politician and justice of Minnesota's Supreme Court
- James B. Drew (MDNG), chief justice of the Supreme Court of Pennsylvania
- Rebecca Duncan (JD), lawyer and judge; associate justice of the Oregon Supreme Court since 2017; served on the Oregon Court of Appeals 2010–2017
- John P. Elkin (JD 1884), associate justice of the Supreme court of Pennsylvania
- Victor A. Elliott (1839–1899), associate justice of the Colorado Supreme Court 1888–1895
- Franz C. Eschweiler (MDNG), jurist from Wisconsin. Eschweiler studied at the University of Michigan and the University of Iowa. In 1910, he was appointed a Wisconsin Circuit Court judge for Milwaukee County, Wisconsin. Eschweiler was appointed to the Wisconsin Supreme Court, in 1916, serving until his death in 1929.
- Robert E. Evans (JD), graduated from the law department of the University of Michigan at Ann Arbor, Michigan in 1886 and was admitted to the bar. He was elected Judge of the Supreme Court from the Third District of Nebraska in 1924. He served until his death on July 8, 1925.
- Bayard T. Hainer (1860–1933), justice of the Territorial Oklahoma Supreme Court in 1898
- Lawrence T. Harris (LLB), politician and lawyer in Oregon; 45th associate justice of the Oregon Supreme Court 1914–1924
- Seneca Haselton (LLB), Vermont educator, attorney and politician, mayor of Burlington, Vermont (1891–1894), U.S. minister to Venezuela (1894–1895), and associate justice of the Vermont Supreme Court (1902–1906, 1908–1919)
- Albert H. Horton (1837–1902), chief justice of the Kansas Supreme Court 1876–1895
- Gilbert V. Indeglia (JD), justice of the Rhode Island Supreme Court
- Orange Jacobs (MDNG), lawyer, newspaper publisher, and politician; Territory of Washington delegate to the U.S. Congress, chief justice of the territory's supreme court, mayor of Seattle,
- Glenn E. Kelley, justice of the Minnesota Supreme Court 1981–1990
- La Vega G. Kinne (1846–1906), justice of the Iowa Supreme Court 1892–1897
- William H. King (JD), held local offices and served two terms in the territorial legislature; joined the Utah bar and practiced law; associate justice of the Utah Supreme Court 1894–1896
- Steven Levinson (JD), associate justice of the Hawaii State Supreme Court 1992–2008.
- Peter J. Maassen (JD), justice of the Alaska Supreme Court, appointed in 2012; appointed chief justice in 2022
- John A. Matthews, justice of the Montana Supreme Court 1919–1920, 1925–1937
- George W. Maxey (BA), justice of the Supreme Court of Pennsylvania 1930–1943 and chief justice 1943–1950
- Abner Vernon McCall (LLM) In 1943, he received an LL.M from the University of Michigan. He was appointed a Texas Supreme Court Justice in June 1956 by Governor Allan Shivers. He was also a past President of the Baptist General Convention of Texas.
- David A. Nichols, justice of the Maine Supreme Judicial Court from May 24, 1977, to May 31, 1988.
- Frank W. Parker (LLB: 1880), judge who served on the New Mexico Supreme Court for 35 years, from its territorial period to after statehood; served on the Territorial Supreme Court, 1898
- Vernon Robert Pearson, associate justice of the Washington Supreme Court 1982–1987, having been named acting chief justice in 1985, and then chief justice 1987–1989
- Charles N. Potter (LLB), justice of the Wyoming Supreme Court 1895–1927
- Albert L. Rendlen (MDNG), judge on the Supreme Court of Missouri 1977–1992, chief justice 1982–1985
- John Campbell Rice (1864–1937), associate justice of the Idaho Supreme Court; chief justice 1922–1923
- John E. Richards (LLB), attorney; associate justice of the California Supreme Court 1924–1932
- John Sherman Robinson (B.A. 1903) (1880–1951), track and field athlete, lawyer, judge, and chief justice of the Washington Supreme Court
- Marvin B. Rosenberry (JD), jurist from Wisconsin; appointed to the Wisconsin Supreme Court; chief justice of the supreme court 1929–1950
- John W. Shenk (LLB), city attorney in Los Angeles, California, a Superior Court judge and a member of the California Supreme Court
- Joseph J. Simeone (SJD), judge on the Supreme Court of Missouri 1978–1979
- William Redwood Smith, associate justice of the Kansas Supreme Court 1899–1905
- Martha B. Sosman, associate justice of the Massachusetts Supreme Judicial Court from 2000 until her death
- William Story (B.A.), United States federal judge and later the seventh lieutenant governor of Colorado, serving from 1891 to 1893 under John Long Routt; judge of the Second Judicial Circuit Court of Arkansas from 1867 to 1871, sitting as "special chief justice" on the Arkansas Supreme Court in 1869
- John Charles Tarsney (LLB), associate justice of the Supreme Court of Oklahoma Territory 1896–1899
- Samuel R. Thurman (LLB), justice of the Utah Supreme Court 1917–1929, chief justice 1927–1929
- Walter L. Tooze (JD), attorney and politician in Oregon, 66th associate justice of the Oregon Supreme Court, state district court judge
- Alfred Wallin (JD), judge, one of the first three justices of the Supreme Court of North Dakota 1889–1902
- Martha Lee Walters (BA), labor attorney and the 43rd chief justice of the Oregon Supreme Court
- J. Stanley Webster (LLB), congressman from Eastern Washington, professor of law at Gonzaga University School of Law, Washington State Supreme Court justice, and federal judge
- Nicodemus D. Wernette, sat on the Idaho Supreme Court 1933–1935

=== Attorneys general ===
As of 2021, 40 Michigan alumni have served as a state's attorney general.

- Paul L. Adams, member of the Michigan Supreme Court in 1962 and 1964–1972; mayor of Sault Ste. Marie 1938–1942; Attorney General of Michigan in 1957; member of the Michigan Supreme Court in 1962
- Eugene F. Black (1903–1990), elected Michigan attorney general as a Republican in 1945
- Charles A. Blair (1854–1912), member of the Michigan Supreme Court 1905–1912; held several public offices including prosecuting attorney for Jackson County; elected attorney general of Michigan in 1902
- Steven G. Bradbury, acting assistant attorney general of the United States for the Office of Legal Counsel, 2005–2009
- Clarence Addison Brimmer, Jr., state attorney general of Wyoming 1971–1974
- Wilber Marion Brucker, assistant attorney general of Michigan, 1927–1928; Michigan attorney general, 1928–1930
- Warren Booth Burrows, member of the Connecticut House of Representatives 1925–1927, member of Connecticut Senate 1927–1928; state attorney general of Connecticut 1931–1935
- Charles Burson, served almost a decade as Tennessee attorney general; became Gore's chief of staff in 1999
- Pamela Carter, first black woman to serve as a state's attorney general
- Mike Cox, Michigan's 52nd attorney general
- Marc Dann, Attorney General of Ohio from 2007 until his resignation in 2008
- Harry M. Daugherty (LAW), attorney general of the United States under Presidents Harding and Coolidge
- Ulysses G. Denman, Republican politician from Ohio; Ohio attorney general 1908–1911
- John R. Dethmers, chairman of the Michigan Republican Party 1942–1945; delegate to the 1944 Republican National Convention; Michigan attorney general 1945–1946
- Tyrone C. Fahner, lawyer; received his bachelor's degree from U-M; Illinois Attorney General 1980–1983
- Charles E. Gibson Jr., Vermont attorney general
- Horace Weldon Gilmore, member of the Michigan Board of Tax Appeals in 1954; deputy state attorney general of Michigan 1954–1956; judge on the 3rd Judicial Circuit of Detroit 1956–1980
- Alexander J. Groesbeck, attorney general; 30th governor of Michigan
- Shiro Kashiwa, first attorney general of Hawaii to be appointed after it became a state in 1959
- Franz C. Kuhn, probate judge; Michigan attorney general in 1910
- Cary D. Landis, 25th Florida attorney general, (1931–1938)
- George A. Malcolm, acting attorney general for the Philippines as of 1911
- Dwight May, Michigan attorney general; served 1869–1873 under Governor Henry P. Baldwin
- Frank Millard, Michigan attorney general, 1951–1954
- William J. Morgan, Wisconsin attorney general 1912–1923, Republican
- Dana Nessel, Michigan's 54th attorney general, lawyer and politician from Michigan, first openly LGBTQ person elected to statewide office in Michigan
- William W. Potter, Michigan Attorney General 1927–1928
- Charles Byron Renfrew, nominated by President Richard Nixon to the United States District Court for the Northern District of California; confirmed by the United States Senate on December 2, 1971, and received his commission on December 9; served until 1980, when he resigned to become U.S. deputy attorney general, serving until 1981
- John W. Reynolds, Sr., attorney general of Wisconsin 1927–1933; Republican
- Stephen John Roth, attorney general of Michigan 1949–1950
- Kenneth Salazar; U.S. senator; attorney general of Colorado 1999–2005
- John M. Sheets, Republican politician; Ohio attorney general 1900–1904
- Winfield Smith, attorney general of Wisconsin 1862–1866; Republican
- Robert Stafford, deputy attorney general of Vermont 1953–1955; attorney general 1955–1957
- Raymond Wesley Starr, attorney general of Michigan 1937–1938
- James M. Swift, lawyer; district attorney of Massachusetts Southern District; attorney general of Massachusetts
- Cyrus Nils Tavares, deputy attorney general of Hawaii 1927–1934 before returning to private practice in Honolulu, 1934–1941; during World War II, special deputy attorney general of Hawaii for war matters, 1941–1942; assistant attorney general of Hawaii, 1942–1943; and attorney general of Hawaii, 1944–1947
- Larry Thompson, lawyer; deputy attorney general of the US under President George W. Bush until 2003
- Paul W. Voorhies, Michigan lawyer; Wayne County prosecutor; Michigan attorney general
- Robert Wefald, 26th North Dakota attorney general 1981–1984

== Presidents or prime ministers ==
- Edgardo Javier Angara (LAW: LLM), president of the Senate of the Philippines 1993–1995
- Arif Alvi (Masters in prosthodontics, 1975), 13th president of Pakistan
- François Duvalier (Public Health, 1944–45), president of Haiti from 1957 until his death in 1971
- Abdullah Ensour (M.A.), the 40th prime minister of Jordan
- Lester Bird (LLB 1959), prime minister of Antigua and Barbuda 1994–2004
- Alfonso Bustamante, prime minister of Peru 1993–1994
- Lamberto Dini, 51st prime minister of Italy
- Simeon Djankov, deputy prime minister and minister of finance of Bulgaria in the government of Boyko Borisov
- Gerald R. Ford (B. A. 1935, HLLD 1974), 38th president of the United States
- Kim Dong-yeon, 36th governor of Gyeonggi Province since 2022; 4th minister of Economy and Finance and deputy prime minister of South Korea 2017–2018
- Pratap Singh Kairon (MA Political Science), chief minister of Punjab 1952–1964
- Herizo Razafimahaleo, former foreign minister and deputy prime minister of Madagascar 1997–1998
- Luis Guillermo Solís Rivera, 47th president of Costa Rica 2014–2018
- His Highness Sheikh Saud Bin Saqr al Qasimi (LS&A: BA, MA), current ruler of Ras al-Khaimah in the United Arab Emirates
- Henry Tang Ying-yen, chief secretary of Hong Kong 2007–2011
- Lawrence Wong (M.A. economics 1995), prime minister of Singapore (2024–present); minister of Finance (2021–present)

== Military ==
=== Admirals ===
- Anderson W. Atkinson, major general in the United States Air Force
- Benjamin N. Bellis, retired Air Force lieutenant general; vice commander in chief, U.S. Air Forces in Europe
- William Clarence Braisted (1883), surgeon
- Erroll M. Brown, retired rear admiral in the US Coast Guard; first African-American promoted to flag rank in the Coast Guard
- Arleigh Burke (COE: MSE), United States Navy admiral; World War II hero; chief of Naval Operations (1955–1961)
- James B. Currie, major general in the United States Air Force
- James E. Dalton, former general and chief of staff of the Supreme Headquarters Allied Powers Europe
- Terrance T. Etnyre (BA 1970), US Navy vice admiral; commander, Naval Surface Forces
- Elon Farnsworth (1858), Union Army brigadier general during the American Civil War; cavalry commander; killed at Gettysburg
- Charles D. Griffin, four-star admiral in the US Navy; commander in chief of US Naval Forces Europe 1963–1965; commander in chief of Allied Forces Southern Europe 1965–1968
- Arthur E. Henn, retired vice admiral in the US Coast Guard; vice commandant 1994–1996
- James W. Houck, retired US Navy vice admiral; 41st Judge Advocate General of the US Navy 2009–2012
- Ali S. Khan (University of Michigan Health System residency in internal medicine and pediatrics), rear admiral in the United States Public Health Service Commissioned Corps; director of the Centers for Disease Control and Prevention
- Robert E. Kramek, retired US Coast Guard admiral; 20th Commandant of the US Coast Guard 1994–1998
- Robert T. Marsh was a retired United States Air Force four-star general who served as Commander, Air Force Systems Command (COMAFSC) from 1981 to 1984.
- Thomas P. Meek, US Navy officer; rear admiral; commander of the Navy Cyber Forces since 2010
- Gordon G. Piche, retired US Coast Guard rear admiral
- Ronald J. Rábago, US Coast Guard rear admiral, in 2006 became the first Hispanic American to be promoted to flag rank
- Miguel Ángel Barberena Vega, rear admiral
- John H. Sides, four-star admiral in the United States Navy who served as commander in chief of the United States Pacific Fleet 1960–1963; known as the "father" of the Navy's guided-missile program.
- Willard J. Smith, became admiral of the Great Lakes Maritime Academy in Traverse City, Michigan in 1973
- Miguel Ángel Barberena Vega, rear admiral
- James A. Watson, US Coast Guard rear admiral
- Donald C. Winter, secretary of the Navy

=== Generals ===
- Gladeon M. Barnes, Army major general; as chief of Research and Engineering in the Ordnance Department, was responsible for the development of 1,600 different weapons
- Dwight E. Beach (MDNG) (1908–2000), commanded the United States Forces Korea from 1965 to 1966 and U.S. Army, Pacific 1966–1968
- John Biddle (MDNG), a career US Army officer; Major General; superintendent of the United States Military Academy
- Henry Patrick Birmingham was a surgeon and an American brigadier general active during World War I.
- Peter J. Boylan (MS 1970) – United States Army major general; President of Georgia Military College
- Margaret A. Brewer (BA 1952) – United States Marine Corps brigadier general, Director of Women Marines (1973–1977); first woman to be promoted to a general officer rank in the Marine Corps
- Wilber Marion Brucker (BA 1916), Secretary of the Army under President Eisenhower
- James B. Currie (1958), United States Air Force major general
- Elon J. Farnsworth (1837–1863), Union Army cavalry general in the American Civil War, killed at the Battle of Gettysburg. Expelled before graduation.
- Alfred B. Fitt, lawyer; General Counsel of the Army 1964–1967
- Roy K. Flint was a Brigadier General in the United States Army, Dean of the Academic Board at the United States Military Academy, and a president of the Society for Military History.
- Lawrence J. Fuller was an American army major general who served as the deputy director of the Defense Intelligence Agency.
- Henry James Hatch (1869–1931), U.S. Army officer in the late 19th and early 20th centuries. He served in World War I and received the Distinguished Service Medal among other awards.
- Charles H. Jacoby Jr. (MA), US Army General; fifth Commander, US Northern Command; 22nd Commander, North American Aerospace Defense Command
- Paul J. Kern (master's degrees in mechanical and civil engineering 1973), former US Army general; commanding general of the United States Army Materiel Command 2001–2004
- Theodore C. Lyster, M.D. (1875–1933), U.S. Army physician and aviation medicine pioneer
- Orrin L. Mann, soldier and politician who served as an officer in the Union Army during the American Civil War.
- David W. May, U.S. Air Force brigadier general, Adjutant General of Wisconsin
- William James Mayo, M.D., FACS, physician and surgeon; one of the seven founders of the Mayo Clinic; promoted to brigadier general, 1918
- Frank Millard (LAW: 1916), appointed by President Eisenhower as general counsel of the U.S. Army in 1955
- William M. Morrow, enlisted in the US Army in 1888; served for more than 40 years until his retirement in 1930; decorated for his service in World War I; brigadier general
- Jasper Packard, U.S. representative from Indiana and brevetted brigadier general.
- David G. Perkins (C.O.E. MSME), US Army lieutenant general; commander of the United States Army Combined Arms Center at Fort Leavenworth, Kansas
- Samuel C. Phillips, U.S. Air Force four-star general who served as Director of NASA's Apollo Program from 1964 to 1969
- Benjamin D. Pritchard (LAW: JD 1860), Civil War general who captured Jefferson Davis; served two terms of office as State Treasurer of Michigan 1880–1884; organized the First National Bank of Allegan in 1870 and served as its president until 1905; founded the First State Bank, which was the first bank in the county to be designated as a state depository, the first savings bank, and the first bank to install safety deposit boxes
- Eric B. Schoomaker (COM: MD, Ph.D.), 42nd Surgeon General of the US Army; commanding general, US Army Medical Command; practicing hematologist
- Robert L. Van Antwerp, Jr. (M.S. mechanical engineering), US Army lieutenant general; chief of Engineers of the United States Army Corps of Engineers 2007–2011

== Foreign officials ==
- Park Soon-ae (Ph.D.), Education Minister and ex officio Deputy Prime Minister of Social Affairs of South Korea under President Yoon Suk-yeol
- Miguel Hernandez Agosto (Ph.D.) 9th President of the Senate of Puerto Rico; President pro tempore of the Senate of Puerto Rico
- Víctor Bravo Ahuja, Mexican politician; academician; Secretary of Public Education in the administration of Luis Echeverría (1970–76); governor of Oaxaca
- Estefania Aldaba-Lim (Ph.D.), first female Filipino cabinet secretary; social services and development secretary 1971–1977; first Filipino clinical psychologist; president of the Girl Scouts of the Philippines; first woman to become special ambassador to the United Nations (1979); UN Peace Medal Award
- Arif Alvi, the 13th and current president of Pakistan, founding member of the Pakistan Tehreek-e-Insaf, secretary-general of the party 2006–2013, and former dentist
- Diego Enrique Arria Salicetti, governor of the Federal District of Caracas in the mid-1970s
- José E. Benedicto, treasurer of Puerto Rico; briefly served as acting governor of Puerto Rico in 1921
- Luis María Ramírez Boettner (1918–2017), Paraguayan diplomat and lawyer; minister of Foreign Affairs of Paraguay 1993–1996
- Santiago Creel Miranda, Mexican senator representing the right-of-center National Action Party; Secretary of the Interior in the cabinet of President Vicente Fox, President of the Senate of Mexico
- Terry Davis (M.B.A. 1962), longtime Labour member of the British House of Commons (1971–2004); secretary general of the Council of Europe (2004–2009); member of the Privy Council
- Simeon Djankov (Bulgarian: Симеон Дянков, Simeon Dyankov (Ph.D. 1997), Bulgarian economist; Deputy Prime Minister and Minister of Finance of Bulgaria in the government of Boyko Borisov
- Piet Hein Donner, Dutch politician of the Christian Democratic Appeal; Minister of the Interior and Kingdom Relations (2010–2012); Minister of Social Affairs and Employment (2007–2010); Minister of Justice (2002–2006)
- Gerardo Ruiz Esparza (LAW), was a Mexican attorney and politician who served as the Secretary of Communications and Transportation in the cabinet of Enrique Peña Nieto.
- Howard Flight (MBA), life peer and Conservative member of the House of Lords (2010–present); former member of the British House of Commons (1997–2005); wealthy entrepreneur and investor
- Julio Frenk (SPH: M.P.H. 1981; MA 1982; Ph.D. 1983), minister of Health for Mexico
- Kamal Ganzouri, appointed as governor of the New Valley State in 1976; governor of the Bani Suef State in 1977 but resigned after just six months
- Henry Ho (Ph.D.), named minister of Finance, Taiwan, in 2006
- José Miguel Insulza Salinas, Chilean politician; statesman; since 2005 the Secretary General of the Organization of American States
- William Ansel Kinney, in 1887 elected to the legislature of the Hawaiian Kingdom as a representative from island of Hawaiʻi. During the summer of 1887, he helped draft the 1887 Constitution of the Kingdom of Hawaii, called the "Bayonet Constitution" because King Kalākaua was forced to sign it.
- Okazaki Kunisuke (岡崎邦輔, 1854–1936), politician and cabinet minister in the late Meiji and Taishō period Empire of Japan
- Catalino Macaraig Jr. (L.L.B.), Filipino politician who was the longest-serving (1987–1990) executive secretary of President Corazon C. Aquino
- Mark Malloch Brown, minister of State for Africa, Asia and the United Nations; 2nd Deputy Secretary-General of the United Nations
- David Mills (LAW), member of the Canadian Parliament for Bothwell, Puisne Justice of the Supreme Court of Canada
- Lafayette Morgan (M.Sc.), President William R. Tolbert, Jr., made him a member of the Cabinet, naming him Liberia's first minister of State without portfolio
- Carlos Rodado Noriega, ambassador of Colombia to Argentina; ambassador of Colombia to Spain; president of Ecopetrol; member of the Chamber of Representatives of Colombia; 58th governor of Atlántico
- Roberto de Ocampo (MBA), chairman and CEO of the Development Bank of the Philippines in 1989; secretary of Finance under President Fidel V. Ramos 1992–1998
- Harry Roque Herminio "Harry" Lopez Roque Jr. (Tagalog: [ˈrɔkɛ]; born 966), Filipino lawyer, politician, and former law professor serving as the presidential spokesperson of President Rodrigo Duterte
- Ricardo Rosselló (American Spanish: [roseˈʝo]; born 1979, Puerto Rican politician, scientist, and businessman, governor of Puerto Rico 2017–2019
- Miriam Defensor Santiago (LL.M. 1975, LL.D. 1976), lawyer; judge; politician; elected judge of the International Criminal Court 2012; senator of the Philippines (1995–2001 and 2004–2010); ran for president of the Philippines in 1992
- Keith Spicer, first commissioner of Official Languages of Canada, 1970–1977
- Khaled Toukan (M.Sc. nuclear engineering 1978), minister of education, Jordan
- Stephen A. Tolbert (B.S., M.S. in forestry), secretary of agriculture and commerce and minister of finance, Liberia
- Maxwell Freeman Yalden (M.A. Ph.D.), Canada's ambassador to Belgium and Luxembourg 1984–1987
- Lawrence Wong (M.A. economics 1995), Singaporean politician who is a Member of Parliament of the Parliament of Singapore (2011–present); Minister for Culture, Community and Youth (2012–2015); Minister for National Development (2015–2020); Second Minister of Finance (2016–present); Minister for Education (2020–present)
- Wang Zhengting (LAW), acting premier of the Republic of China

== Secretaries of the cabinet ==
As of 2020, Michigan matriculants have served in 42 cabinet positions.

- Clinton Presba Anderson (1915–1916), congressional representative; Senator from New Mexico; Secretary of Agriculture
- Edgardo Angara (LAW: LLM 1964), secretary of agriculture (emeritus) of the Philippines; former executive secretary
- José Celso Barbosa Alcala, Puerto Rican physician, sociologist and political leader, "father of the Statehood for Puerto Rico movement"
- Rand Beers (MA 1970), service career spanning 25 years; took over terrorism and narcotics desk at the National Security Council following Oliver North; appointed by President Clinton in 1998 to Assistant Secretary of State for International Narcotic and Law Enforcement Affairs; assigned to counter-terrorism in the George W. Bush White House; foreign policy advisor to John Kerry campaign
- Grace Bochenek, acting United States secretary of energy in 2017
- Steven G. Bradbury (J.D. 1988) 14th United States deputy secretary of transportation (2025–present)
- Bill Brehm (A.B., M.A.), assistant secretary of the army under Presidents Johnson and Nixon; assistant secretary of defense under Presidents Nixon and Ford; Chairman (emeritus) of SRA International
- Douglas A. Brook (B.A., M.A.), nominated in 2007 as assistant secretary of the Navy; professor of Public Policy and Director of the Center for Defense Management Reform in the School of Business and Public Policy at the Naval Postgraduate School; former Dean of the School of Business and Public Policy at the Naval Postgraduate School; former acting director of the U.S. Office of Personnel Management and Assistant Secretary of the Army (Financial Management)
- Wilber Marion Brucker (A.B. 1916), secretary of the Army
- Philip W. Buchen (LAW) (1916–2001), attorney who served as White House counsel during the Ford administration; served as chief White House Counsel with cabinet rank for the duration of Ford's presidency
- Ben Carson(born 1951), neurosurgeon, author, and politician who was the 17th United States Secretary of Housing and Urban Development, under the Trump administration
- Roy D. Chapin, Sr. (MDNG), US secretary of commerce, 1932–1933; Hudson Motors president and CEO (1934–1936); Hudson Motors president and CEO (1909–1923); Hudson Motors co-founder (1906–1909); member of the Board of Hudson Motors (as chairman 1923–1936)
- Terry Davis (BUS: MBA 1962), member of Britain's Parliament for 28 years; Secretary General of the Council of Europe; human rights activist
- William Rufus Day, United States Secretary of State during the Mckinley administration; negotiated the peace treaty ending the Spanish–American War; appointed as an Associate Justice of the United States Supreme Court by President Roosevelt
- Edwin C. Denby (LAW: JD 1896), congressional representative from Michigan; employed in the Chinese imperial maritime customs service 1887–1894; member of the State House of Representatives in 1903; elected as a Republican to the Fifty-ninth, Sixtieth, and Sixty-first Congresses (1905–1911); president of the Detroit Charter Commission in 1913 and 1914; president of the Detroit Board of Commerce in 1916 and 1917; appointed United States Secretary of the Navy by President Harding and served 1921–1924
- Robert F. Ellsworth (LAW: JD 1949), congressional representative from Kansas; assistant to vice chairman, Federal Maritime Board in 1953 and 1954; elected as a Republican to the Eighty-seventh and to the two succeeding Congresses (1961–1967); national political director of the presidential campaign in 1968; special assistant to President Nixon, 1969; permanent representative on the Council of the North Atlantic Treaty Organization, with rank of ambassador, 1969–1971; general partner in Lazard Freres and Co. of New York City; Assistant Secretary of Defense (International Security Affairs), 1974–1975; nominated by President Ford to be Deputy Secretary of Defense and served in that capacity 1975–1977; vice chairman of the council, 1977–1990, chairman, 1990–1996, vice president, 1996 to present, International Institute for Strategic Studies, London, England; appointed to the U.S.-China Economic Security Review Commission, 2003–present
- Howard Flight (BUS: MBA), British MP; holds 11 directorships; appointed shadow paymaster general in 2001; in 2002 was promoted to shadow chief secretary to the Treasury
- Dan Glickman (BA History 1966), congressional representative from Kansas; United States Securities and Exchange Commission, 1969–1970; elected as a Democrat to the Ninety-fifth and to the eight succeeding Congresses (1977–1995); one of the managers appointed by the House of Representatives in 1986 to conduct the impeachment proceedings against Harry E. Claiborne, judge of the United States District Court for Nevada; chair, Permanent Select Committee on Intelligence (One Hundred Third Congress); chaired the House Permanent Select Committee on Intelligence; launched an inquiry into the Aldrich Ames spy case; United States Secretary of Agriculture; president and CEO of the MPAA in 2004
- James William Good (LAW: JD 1893), congressional representative from Iowa; elected as a Republican to the Sixty-first and to the six succeeding Congresses and served 1909–1921; chairman, Committee on Appropriations (Sixty-sixth and Sixty-seventh Congresses); appointed secretary of war in the Cabinet of President Hoover and served from 1929 until his death in 1929
- James F. Goodrich (B.S. 1937), under secretary of the Navy 1981–1987
- George M. Humphrey, secretary of the treasury during the Eisenhower administration
- Arthur M. Hyde (BA 1899), governor of Missouri, 1921–25; US secretary of agriculture (1929–33)
- Broderick D. Johnson, partner at Bryan Cav; assistant to the president and the former White House cabinet secretary for President Barack Obama
- Philip Lader (M.A.), member of President Clinton's cabinet as administrator of the US Small Business Administration, assistant to the president, White House deputy chief of staff, and deputy director of the US Office of Management and Budget
- Robert P. Lamont (BSCE 1891), US commerce secretary, 1929–32
- George de Rue Meiklejohn (LAW: JD 1880), congressional representative from Nebraska; member of the State senate 1884–1888 and served as its president 1886–1888; chairman of the Republican State convention of 1887; chairman of the Republican State central committee in 1887 and 1888; lieutenant governor of Nebraska 1889–1891; elected as a Republican to the Fifty-third and Fifty-fourth Congresses (1893–1897); appointed by President McKinley as assistant secretary of war in 1897 and served until his resignation in 1901
- Julius Sterling Morton (A.B. 1854), United States Secretary of Agriculture under President Cleveland; created Arbor Day
- David Norquist (B.A., MPP), acting U.S. secretary of defense; 34th U.S. deputy secretary of defense
- Tom Price (born 1954), physician and Republican politician who was the 23rd United States Secretary of Health and Human Services under the Trump administration.
- Mark E. Rey (MA 1976), former timber lobbyist; undersecretary for natural resources and environment at the Agriculture Department; oversees the Forest Service
- Harvey S. Rosen (A.B. 1970), chair of President Bush's Council of Economic Advisers; deputy assistant secretary for tax analysis in the Department of the Treasury under President George H.W. Bush 1989–1991
- Kenneth Lee Salazar (LAW: JD 1981), senator from Colorado; chief legal counsel to Governor Roy Romer of Colorado, 1986–1990; executive director, Colorado Department of Natural Resources 1990–1994; Colorado state attorney general 1999–2005; elected as a Democrat to the U.S. Senate in 2004 for term beginning January 3, 2005; appointed secretary of the interior in 2009
- Kris Sarri (MPH), nominee for Assistant Secretary of State for Oceans and International Environmental and Scientific Affairs
- Rajiv Shah (B.S.E. (economics), 1995), former Under Secretary of Agriculture for Research, Education, and Economics and Chief Scientist at the United States Department of Agriculture; 16th Administrator of the United States Agency for International Development
- Edwin Forrest Sweet (LAW: JD 1874), congressional representative from Michigan; mayor of Grand Rapids 1904–1906; elected as a Democrat to the Sixty-second Congress (1911–1913); Assistant Secretary of Commerce 1913–1921
- Henry Tang (A.B. 1976), financial secretary of Hong Kong, August 4, 2003–present
- John F. Turner (MA), reelected in 2007 to board of directors of Peabody Energy; former Assistant Secretary of State for Oceans and International Environmental and Scientific Affairs within the State Department; former president and chief executive officer of the Conservation Fund; Director of the U.S. Fish and Wildlife Service 1989–1993; served 19 years in the Wyoming State Legislature; former president of the Wyoming State Senate; director of International Paper and Ashland, Inc.
- Edwin Uhl (MA 1863), United States secretary of state and ambassador to Germany during the Cleveland Administration
- Edwin Willits (AB 1955), congressional representative from Michigan; member of the State board of education 1860–1872; appointed postmaster of Monroe in 1863 by President Lincoln, and removed by President Johnson in 1866; member of the commission to revise the constitution of the State in 1873; elected as a Republican to the Forty-fifth, Forty-sixth, and Forty-seventh Congresses (1877–1883); president of the Michigan Agricultural College 1885–1889; first assistant secretary of agriculture 1889–1893
- Donald C. Winter (Ph.D. Physics 1972), president of Northrop Grumman's Mission Systems sector; former president and CEO of TRW Systems; elected to the National Academy of Engineering in 2002; appointed United States Secretary of the Navy in 2006
- Hubert Work (MED: 1882–1884), US interior secretary, 1923–28

== State senators ==
As of 2021, Michigan's matriculants include 53 state senators.

- Kazuhisa Abe (LAW) (1914–1996), Democratic state senator and justice of the Supreme Court of Hawaii
- Elroy M. Avery (LAW: Ph.D. LL.D.) (1844–1935), school principal, politician, author, historian, Ohio state senator in the 1890s
- Richard J. Barr (LAW), served in the Illinois State Senate
- Albert Berkowitz (AB), elected in 1957 to the New York State Senate (37th D.), to fill the vacancy caused by the death of Henry Neddo; re-elected three times, and remained in the State Senate until 1964, sitting in the 171st, 172nd, 173rd and 174th New York State Legislatures
- Kenneth F. Berry, served the 19th District of the Ohio Senate in 1972
- Theodore G. Bilbo (LAW), member of the Mississippi Senate from the 4th district
- Mike Bishop, served in the Michigan State Senate 2003–2010;majority leader
- Kate Bolz (born 1979), politician and social worker who served as a member of the Nebraska Legislature, representing the 29th district 2013–2021 as a state senator
- John E. Braun (MBA) (born 1967), businessman, veteran, and politician from Washington. A Republican, Braun serves in the Washington State Senate, representing the 20th district
- Bill Bullard Jr. (BA), member of the Michigan Senate from the 15th district and the 25th district
- Martha Hughes Cannon (MED) (1857–1932), Utah state senator, physician, Utah women's rights advocate, suffragist, polygamous wife, and a Welsh-born immigrant to the United States
- Charles B. Carter (LAW), lawyer in Maine and also served in the Maine Senate
- George D. Chafee (LAW), served in the Illinois House of Representatives in 1881 and 1882, Republican, served in the Illinois Senate 1905–1909
- Stephanie Chang (BA, MA, MSW, MPP), Democratic politician from Michigan representing the 1st district of the Michigan Senate, state senator
- Patrick Colbeck (BS, MS), aerospace engineer, author, former elected official, and former candidate for governor in Michigan, former Republican member of the Michigan Senate
- J. Mac Davis (LAW), elected to the Wisconsin State Senate in 1982, as a Republican, and was re-elected in 1986
- William H. J. Ely (LAW), elected to the New Jersey Senate in 1931, defeating Harry Harper, becoming the first Democrat from Bergen County to serve in the Senate in sixteen years
- Tom George (BA, MD) (born 1956), Republican politician from the U.S. state of Michigan. As a member[1] of the Michigan State Senate, he represented Kalamazoo County as well as an eastern portion of Van Buren County.
- Paul Gillmor (LAW) (born 1956) is a Republican politician from the U.S. state of Michigan. As a member[1] of the Michigan State Senate, he represented Kalamazoo County as well as an eastern portion of Van Buren County.
- Bradley M. Glass (LAW) (1931–2015), politician in the state of Illinois, served in the Illinois Senate 1973–1979, and in the Illinois House of Representatives in 1971
- Randy Gordon (BA) (born 1953), Democratic Washington state senator from Bellevue, Washington
- William G. Hare (LAW), in 1920, elected to a four-year term in the Oregon State Senate representing District 11. Hare won re-election in 1924 to a second four-year term and remained in office through the 1927 session.
- Tom Hayden, member of the California Senate from the 23rd district
- Arthur L. Haywood III (LAW), politician from Pennsylvania who served as a Democratic member of the Pennsylvania state senator for the 4th district
- Kirby Hendee (LAW), served in the Wisconsin State Senate in 1957, Republican
- Adam Hollier (MUP), politician serving as a member of the Michigan Senate from the 2nd district
- Hoon-Yung Hopgood (BA), member of the Michigan Senate from the 6th district 8th district (2011–2014)
- Gideon S. Ives (LAW) (1846–1927), mayor of St. Peter, Minnesota, Minnesota state senator, 11th lieutenant governor of Minnesota
- Tom Johnson (BA) (1945–2018), Republican Illinois state senator
- Marcia A. Karrow (MA) (born 1959), Republican politician who served in the New Jersey State Senate, where she represented the 23rd Legislative District
- Roger A. Keats (BA), served in the Illinois House of Representatives 1976–1979, Republican, served in the Illinois Senate 1979–1993
- John F. Kelly (BA), elected to the Michigan State Senate in 1978 from Detroit and served four consecutive four-year terms
- Dale Kildee (MA), member of the Michigan State Senate 1975–1976
- Antoinette Kinney (BA), politician and community leader who served in the Utah State Senate
- Elbert L. Lampson (LAW), served as permanent chairman of the Republican State Convention at Dayton in 1888. In 1891 he was elected to the State Senate to represent the Twenty-fourth and Twenty-sixth districts.
- Burton Leland (MSW), member of the Michigan Senate from the 5th district
- Andrew Caldwell Mailer (BA) (1853–1909), member of the Wisconsin State Senate
- Lance Mason (LAW: JD), member of the Ohio Senate
- Oscar W. McConkie (1887–1966), Utah state senator
- Carrie Meek (MS), first African-American woman elected to the Florida Senate
- Lyman Decatur Norris (MDNG) (1823–1894), lawyer, member of the Michigan Constitutional Convention of 1867, and a state senator from Washtenaw County, Michigan 1869–1871
- Tom Price (BA, MD), member of the Georgia Senate from the 56th district
- June Robinson (MPH) (born 1959), Democratic member of the Washington State Senate, representing the 38th Legislative District
- Frank P. Sadler (LAW), served in the Illinois State Senate 1919–1923
- William Sesler (LAW) (1928–2017), Democratic member of the Pennsylvania State Senate 1961–1972
- Ken Sikkema (MBA), 12th majority leader of the Michigan Senate
- Fred J. Slater (LAW), member of the New York State Senate (46th D.) from 1929 to 1934, sitting in the 152nd, 153rd, 154th, 155th, 156th and 157th New York State Legislatures
- Alma Wheeler Smith (BA), member of the Michigan Senate from the 18th district
- Gloria Tanner (born 1935), former politician and public figure; in 1994, became the first African American woman to serve as a Colorado state senator
- Laura M. Toy (BGS), represented the 6th district in the Michigan Senate 2003–2006
- James Franklin Ware (LAW) (1849–1934), member of the Wisconsin State Assembly and the Wisconsin State Senate
- Hank Wilkins (BA), member of the Arkansas Senate from the 5th district
- Merrick Wing (LAW) (1833–1895), member of the Wisconsin State Senate
- Gerald Van Woerkom (MA), member of the Michigan Senate from the 34th district

== United States senators ==
As of 2025, Michigan matriculants include 49 United States senators, including 1 senator-elect, 33 of whom graduated from the University of Michigan Law School.

- John B. Allen (LAW: 1869), U.S. senator from Washington
- Clinton Anderson (1915–1916), U.S. senator from New Mexico
- Henry F. Ashurst (LAW: 1903), U.S. senator from Arizona
- Lucien Baker (LAW), U.S. senator from Kansas
- Calvin S. Brice (LAW: 1865), U.S. senator from Ohio
- Arthur Brown (LAW: 1864), U.S. senator from Utah
- William J. Bulow (LAW: 1893), U.S. senator from South Dakota
- Don B. Colton (LAW: 1905), U.S. senator from Utah
- Royal S. Copeland (MED: 1889), U.S. senator from New York
- Cushman Kellogg Davis (LAW: 1857), U.S. senator from Minnesota
- Sheridan Downey (LAW: LLB 1907), U.S. senator from California
- Abdul El-Sayed (BS: 2007), U.S. senator-elect from Michigan
- Homer S. Ferguson (LAW: LLB 1913), U.S. senator from Michigan
- Woodbridge N. Ferris (MED 1873–1874), U.S. senator from Michigan
- Ernest Willard Gibson (LAW), U.S. senator from Vermont
- Robert P. Griffin (LAW: 1950), U.S. senator from Michigan
- Philip Hart (LAW: 1937), U.S. senator from Michigan
- Charles Henderson (LAW: 1895), U.S. senator from Nevada
- J. Lister Hill (attended), U.S. senator from Alabama
- Gilbert Hitchcock (LAW: LLB), U.S. senator from Nebraska
- Nancy Kassebaum (MA), U.S. senator from Kansas
- John W. Kern (LAW: LLB), Democratic U.S. senator from Indiana
- William H. King (LAW), U.S. senator from Utah
- Cyrus Locher (attended) served as a United States Senator from Ohio
- Oren E. Long (attended ) served as a US Senator from Hawaii
- Porter J. McCumber (LAW: 1880), U.S. senator from North Dakota
- Rice W. Means (LAW: 1901), Republican U.S. senator from Colorado
- Blair Moody Jr. (LAW: LLB 1952) served as a United States Senator from Michigan
- Bernie Moreno (BUS: BBA 1989), U.S. senator from Ohio
- Thomas W. Palmer (attended), U.S. senator from Michigan
- Rob Portman (LAW: JD), U.S. senator from Ohio
- Joseph V. Quarles (LAW: LLB 1867), U.S. senator from Wisconsin
- Donald Riegle (BA), U.S. senator from Michigan
- Donald S. Russell (LAW: 1929), U.S. senator from South Carolina
- Ken Salazar (LAW: JD 1981), U.S. senator from Colorado
- John F. Shafroth (AB: 1875), U.S. senator from Colorado
- Benjamin F. Shively (LAW: 1886), U.S. senator from Indiana
- Robert Stafford (attended), U.S. senator from Vermont
- Ozora P. Stearns (LAW: 1860), U.S. senator from Minnesota
- George Sutherland (LAW), U.S. senator from Utah
- Charles S. Thomas (LAW: LLB), U.S. senator from Colorado
- Charles A. Towne (LAW), U.S. senator from Minnesota
- Charles E. Townsend (AB), U.S. senator from Michigan
- Arthur Vandenberg (LAW: 1900–1901), U.S. senator from Michigan
- William Warner (LAW), U.S. senator from Missouri
- Charles W. Waterman (LAW: 1889), U.S. senator from Colorado
- Adonijah Welch (AB: 1846), U.S. senator from Florida
- Burton K. Wheeler (LAW: 1905), U.S. senator from Montana
- Alexander Wiley (AB), U.S. senator from Wisconsin

== Other ==
- Cora Agnes Benneson (BA: 1878; LAW: 1880; MA; 1883), attorney, lecturer, and writer
- Heidi Li Feldman, law professor
- Roberta Karmel (born 1937), Centennial Professor of Law at Brooklyn Law School, and first female Commissioner of the U.S. Securities and Exchange Commission.
- Laura A. Woodin Le Valley, admitted to practice before the supreme court of Michigan on November 12, 1881
- Shana Madoff, compliance officer and attorney at securities firm of Ponzi schemer Bernard Madoff
- Teresa Stanek Rea (PHARM, B.S. 1976), Acting Under Secretary of Commerce for Intellectual Property and Acting Director of the United States Patent and Trademark Office
- Byron Sylvester Waite was an associate justice of the United States Customs Court and was previously a Member of the Board of General Appraisers
