= Sarri =

Sarri is a surname. Notable people with the surname include:

- Alessio Sarri (born 1973), Italian wheelchair fencer
- Kris Sarri, American public official
- Maurizio Sarri (born 1959), Italian football manager
- Olle Sarri (born 1972), Swedish actor
- Veatriki Sarri (born 1998), Greek footballer
