= Justice Kelly =

Justice Kelly may refer to:

- Fallon Kelly (1907–1992), associate justice of the Minnesota Supreme Court
- Harry Kelly (politician) (1895–1971), associate justice of the Michigan Supreme Court
- James K. Kelly (1819–1903), chief justice of the Oregon Supreme Court
- Joseph L. Kelly (1867–1925), associate justice of the Supreme Court of Appeals of Virginia
- Marilyn Jean Kelly (born 1938), associate justice of the Michigan Supreme Court
- Mary Beth Kelly (fl. 1980s–2020s), associate justice of the Michigan Supreme Court
- Percy R. Kelly (1870–1949), chief justice of the Oregon Supreme Court

== See also ==
- Donald E. Kelley (1908–1995), associate justice of the Colorado Supreme Court
- Glenn E. Kelley (1921–1992), associate justice of the Minnesota Supreme Court
- Judge Kelly (disambiguation)
