= George La Plata =

American judge (1924–2010)

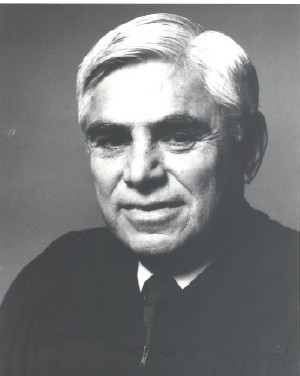

Judge of the United States District Court for the Eastern District of Michigan
- In office April 4, 1985 – August 3, 1996
- Appointed by: Ronald Reagan
- Preceded by: Seat established by 98 Stat. 333
- Succeeded by: Victoria A. Roberts

Personal details
- Born: George La Plata; October 17, 1924 Detroit, Michigan, U.S.
- Died: November 14, 2010 (aged 86) Naples, Florida, U.S.
- Education: Wayne State University (AB); Michigan State University (LLB)

George La Plata (October 17, 1924 – November 14, 2010) was a United States district judge of the United States District Court for the Eastern District of Michigan.

== Education and career ==
Born in Detroit, Michigan, La Plata was in the United States Marine Corps during World War II, from 1943 to 1946 and during the Korean War, from 1952 to 1954. He received an Artium Baccalaureus degree from Wayne State University in 1951 and a Bachelor of Laws from Detroit College of Law in 1956. He was in private practice in Detroit from 1956 to 1979. He was a Circuit judge, Oakland County, Michigan from 1979 to 1985, and was a professor at the Detroit College of Law from 1985 to 1986.

== Federal judicial service ==
On February 27, 1985, La Plata was nominated by President Ronald Reagan to a new seat on the United States District Court for the Eastern District of Michigan created by 98 Stat. 333. He was confirmed by the United States Senate on April 3, 1985, and received his commission on April 4, 1985. La Plata served in that capacity until his retirement, on August 3, 1996.

== Death ==
La Plata died on November 14, 2010, at the age of 86, in Naples, Florida, where he had moved to after his retirement.

== See also ==
- List of Hispanic and Latino American jurists
- List of first minority male lawyers and judges in Michigan

== Sources ==
Legal offices
Preceded by Seat established by 98 Stat. 333	Judge of the United States District Court for the Eastern District of Michigan; 1985–1996	Succeeded by Victoria A. Roberts
