= Judge Kelly =

Judge Kelly or Kelley may refer to:

- Angel Kelley (born 1967), judge of the United States District Court for the District of Massachusetts
- Claire R. Kelly (born 1965), judge of the United States Court of International Trade
- James McGirr Kelly (1928–2005), judge of the United States District Court for the Eastern District of Pennsylvania
- Jane L. Kelly (born 1964), judge of the United States Court of Appeals for the Eighth Circuit
- John David Kelly (judge) (1934–1998), judge of the United States Court of Appeals for the Eighth Circuit
- Patrick F. Kelly (1929–2007), judge of the United States District Court for the District of Kansas
- Paul Joseph Kelly Jr. (born 1940), judge of the United States Court of Appeals for the Tenth Circuit
- Robert F. Kelly (born 1935), judge of the United States District Court for the Eastern District of Pennsylvania
- Timothy J. Kelly (born 1969), judge of the United States District Court for the District of Columbia
- Walter D. Kelley Jr. (born 1955), judge of the United States District Court for the Eastern District of Virginia

== See also ==
- Justice Kelly (disambiguation)
