= John E. Bird =

American judge

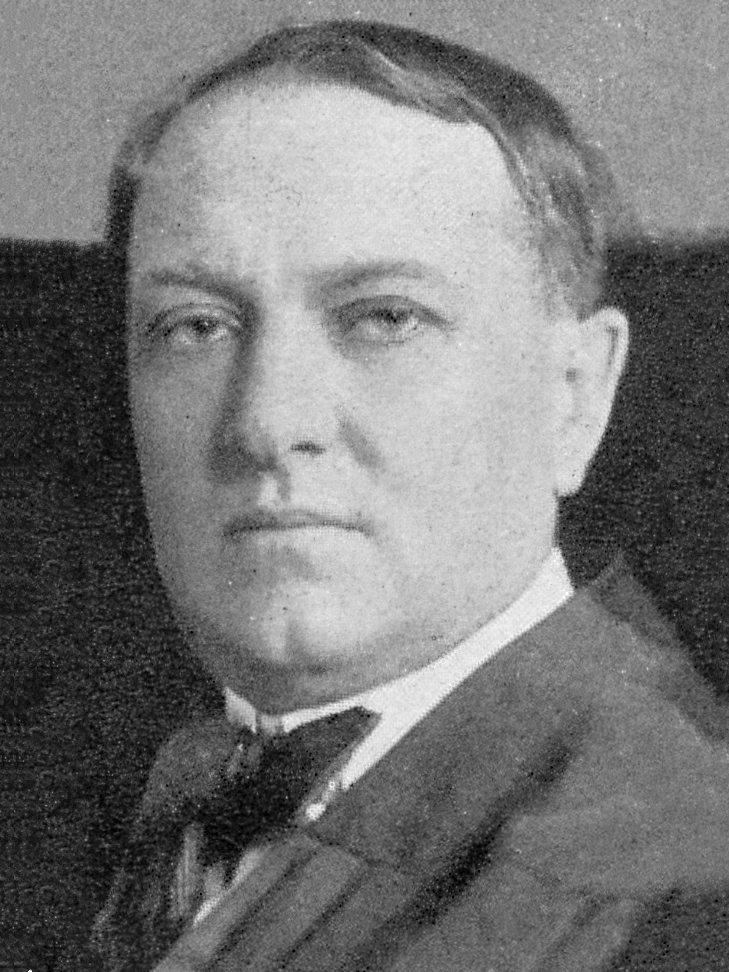
Michigan Attorney General John E. Bird

John E. Bird (1862–1928) was a member of the Michigan Supreme Court from 1910 to 1928.

Bird was born in Clayton, Michigan. Bird graduated from Adrian College. He was admitted to the bar and in 1894 was elected prosecuting attorney for Lenawee County. He served in this position until 1899.

In 1905 Bird was elected the Attorney General. He served in this position until 1910. While in this position he was involved in litigation over the methods of taxing the railroad.

Bird was appointed to the Michigan Supreme Court by Governor Fred M. Warner. He was re-elected to the court three times, and was still serving on the court at the time of his death.

== Sources ==
- bio of Bird

Legal offices
Preceded by Charles A. Blair	Michigan Attorney General; 1905–1910	Succeeded by Franz C. Kuhn
