= Elaine E. Bucklo =

American judge (born 1944)

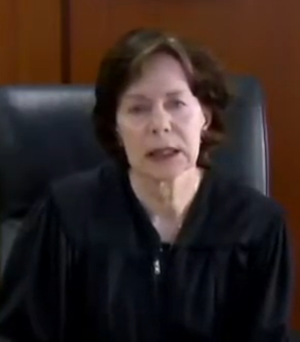

Senior Judge of the United States District Court for the Northern District of Illinois
- Incumbent
- Assumed office October 31, 2009

Judge of the United States District Court for the Northern District of Illinois
- In office October 11, 1994 – October 31, 2009
- Appointed by: Bill Clinton
- Preceded by: John Albert Nordberg
- Succeeded by: Edmond E. Chang

Magistrate Judge of the United States District Court for the Northern District of Illinois
- In office 1985–1994

Personal details
- Born: Elaine Patricia Edwards; October 1, 1944 (age 81) Chelsea, Massachusetts
- Education: Saint Louis University (AB); Northwestern University School of Law (JD)

Elaine Patricia Bucklo (née Edwards; born October 1, 1944) is a senior United States district judge of the United States District Court for the Northern District of Illinois.

== Education and career ==
Born in Chelsea, Massachusetts, Bucklo received an Artium Baccalaureus degree from Saint Louis University in 1966 and a Juris Doctor from Northwestern University School of Law in 1972. She was a law clerk to Judge Robert Sprecher of the United States Court of Appeals for the Seventh Circuit from 1972 to 1973, and was thereafter in private practice in Chicago, Illinois from 1973 to 1978 and from 1980 to 1985, having been a visiting professor of law at the UC Davis School of Law from 1978 to 1980. She was then a United States magistrate judge for the United States District Court for the Northern District of Illinois from 1985 to 1994.

== Federal judicial service ==
On August 16, 1994, Bucklo was nominated by President Bill Clinton to a seat on the United States District Court for the Northern District of Illinois vacated by John Albert Nordberg. She was confirmed by the United States Senate on October 7, 1994, and received her commission on October 11, 1994. She assumed senior status on October 31, 2009.

Legal offices
Preceded by John Albert Nordberg	Judge of the United States District Court for the Northern District of Illinois; 1994–2009	Succeeded by Edmond E. Chang
