= Robert J. White (judge) =

American judge (born 1985)

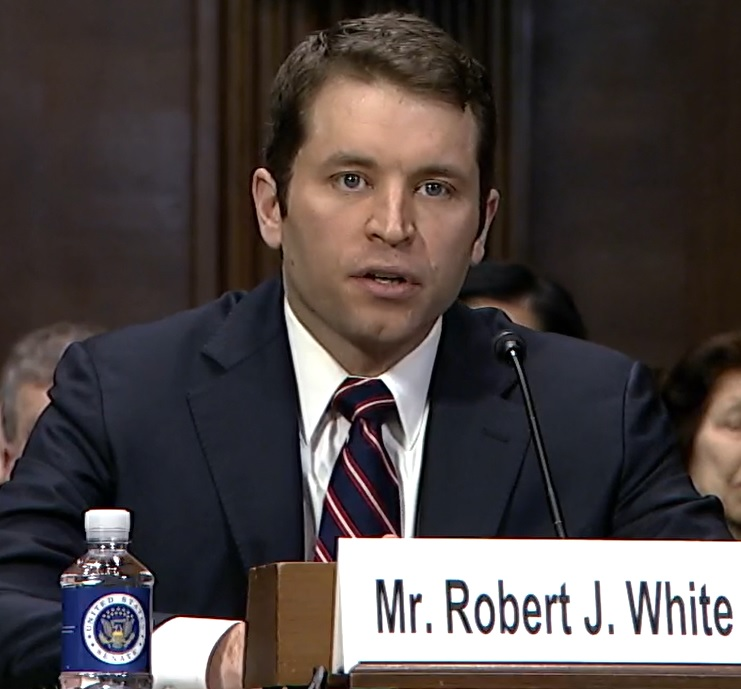

Judge of the United States District Court for the Eastern District of Michigan
- Incumbent
- Assumed office April 15, 2024
- Appointed by: Joe Biden
- Preceded by: Paul D. Borman

Personal details
- Born: Robert Jerome White; 1985 (age 40–41) Royal Oak, Michigan, U.S.
- Education: University of Michigan (BA); Illinois Institute of Technology (JD)

Robert Jerome White (born 1985) is an American lawyer who has served as a United States district judge of the United States District Court for the Eastern District of Michigan since 2024. He previously served as an assistant U.S. attorney from 2014 to 2024.

== Education ==
White received a Bachelor of Arts from the University of Michigan in 2007 and a Juris Doctor from Chicago-Kent College of Law at the Illinois Institute of Technology in 2010.

== Career ==
After law school, he was an associate at Ralph E. Meczyk & Associates in Chicago from 2010 to 2014, handling federal and state criminal defense cases. White served in the U.S. Attorney's Office for the United States District Court for the Western District of Texas from 2014 to 2018 where he prosecuted organized crime. He was an assistant U.S. attorney in the U.S. Attorney's Office for the Eastern District of Michigan from 2018 to 2024 where he was assigned to the white collar crime unit.

=== Federal judicial service ===
On January 10, 2024, President Joe Biden announced his intent to nominate White as a United States district judge of the United States District Court for the Eastern District of Michigan. On February 1, 2024, President Biden nominated White to a seat vacated by Judge Paul D. Borman, who assumed senior status on August 1, 2023. On February 8, 2024, a hearing on his nomination was held before the Senate Judiciary Committee. On March 7, 2024, his nomination was reported out of committee by a 14–7 vote. On April 9, 2024, the United States Senate invoked cloture on his nomination by a 58–42 vote. Later that day, his nomination was confirmed by a 58–42 vote. He received his judicial commission on April 15, 2024, and was sworn in on April 16, 2024.

Legal offices
Preceded by Paul D. Borman	Judge of the United States District Court for the Eastern District of Michigan; 2024–present	Incumbent
