= Bernard Martin Decker =

American judge

Senior Judge of the United States District Court for the Northern District of Illinois
- In office April 2, 1980 – November 3, 1993

Judge of the United States District Court for the Northern District of Illinois
- In office December 12, 1962 – April 2, 1980
- Appointed by: John F. Kennedy
- Preceded by: Seat established by 75 Stat. 80
- Succeeded by: John Albert Nordberg

Personal details
- Born: Bernard Martin Decker; April 2, 1904 Highland Park, Illinois
- Died: November 3, 1993 (aged 89) Chicago, Illinois
- Education: University of Illinois at Urbana–Champaign (A.B.); Harvard Law School (LL.B.)

Bernard Martin Decker (April 2, 1904 – November 3, 1993) was a United States district judge of the United States District Court for the Northern District of Illinois.

== Education and career ==
Born in Highland Park, Illinois, Decker received an Artium Baccalaureus degree from the University of Illinois at Urbana–Champaign in 1926 and a Bachelor of Laws from Harvard Law School in 1929. He was in private practice in Waukegan, Illinois from 1929 to 1951. He was a law clerk to a Judge of the Illinois Appellate Court from 1944 to 1948. He was a Judge of the Illinois Circuit Court from 1951 to 1962.

== Federal judicial service ==
Decker received a recess appointment from President John F. Kennedy on December 12, 1962, to the United States District Court for the Northern District of Illinois, to a new seat authorized by 75 Stat. 80. He was nominated to the same position by President Kennedy on January 15, 1963. He was confirmed by the United States Senate on March 28, 1963, and received his commission on April 2, 1963. He assumed senior status on April 2, 1980. His service terminated on November 3, 1993, due to his death in Chicago, Illinois.

== Sources ==
Legal offices
Preceded by Seat established by 75 Stat. 80	Judge of the United States District Court for the Northern District of Illinois; 1962–1980	Succeeded by John Albert Nordberg
