= Ellen Podgor =

Ellen Podgor is an expert on white-collar crime and runs a white collar crime blog, which has been quoted by such blogs as The Wall Street Journal's Law Blog and the Daily Kos.

A professor at Stetson University College of Law, Podgor was named the Gary R. Trombley Family White-Collar Crime Research Professor in 2011, has been quoted in The New York Times, The Washington Post, The Wall Street Journal and other publications on big news stories such as Bernie Madoff and Enron.

She has co-authored books and articles on white collar crime, criminal law and international criminal law, and in 2010 testified before the House Judiciary Subcommittee on Crime, Terrorism, and Homeland Security on the topic of overcriminalization. She has written numerous law journal articles, including one in The Yale Law Journal Online about what she saw as harsh punishments of white collar criminals. She is the co-author with federal judge Paul D. Borman and Professors Peter Henning and Jerold Israel of the casebook White Collar Crime: Law and Practice.

She and Professor Roger Clark, of Rutgers–Camden, led an effort to have the American Law Institute come out in opposition of the death penalty That motion did not succeed, but led to discussion and debate that two years later, resulted in the organization dropping mention of the death penalty from its Model Penal Code.

Podgor started her law career as a prosecutor, but later became a defense attorney and is active in the National Association of Criminal Defense Lawyers. Under Podgor's leadership, Stetson and NACDL have created the White Collar Criminal Defense College, which they bill as a boot-camp for defense attorneys to better hone their advocacy skills. Podgor won the NACDL's top award, the Robert C. Heeney Memorial Award, in August 2010.
