= Franz C. Kuhn =

American judge

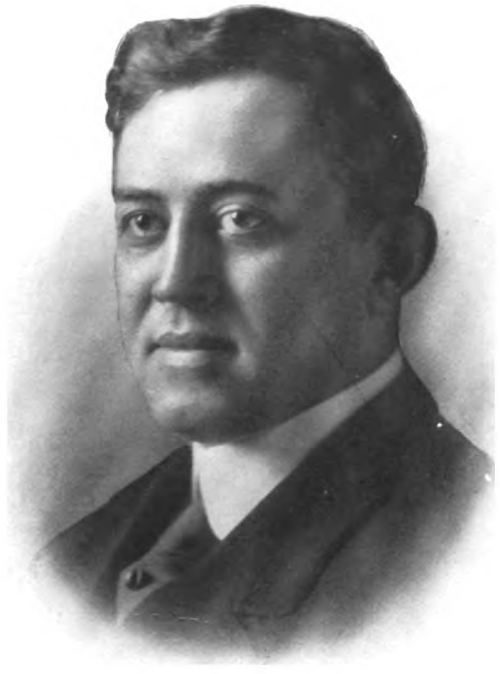

Attorney General of Michigan
- In office 1910–1912
- Governor: Fred M. Warner
- Preceded by: John E. Bird
- Succeeded by: Roger I. Wykes

Personal details
- Born: February 8, 1872 Detroit, Michigan, U.S.
- Died: June 16, 1926 (aged 54) Harper Hospital, Detroit, Michigan, U.S.
- Party: Republican
- Education: University of Michigan

Franz Christian Kuhn (February 8, 1872 – June 16, 1926) was an American lawyer and judge. He served as Michigan Attorney General and later as a justice of the Michigan Supreme Court in the early 20th century. Kuhn was a Republican.

== Early life and education ==
Kuhn was born in Detroit on February 8, 1872. He was educated in the Mount Clemens, Michigan public schools. He graduated from the Literary Department of the University of Michigan in 1893 and from the Law Department of the University of Michigan (later the University of Michigan Law School) in 1894.

== Career ==
Following graduation, Kuhn began practicing law in Mount Clemens. He served as circuit court commissioner of Macomb County until 1896, when he was elected Macomb County prosecuting attorney. Kuhn was reelected in 1898 and 1900.

In 1904, Kuhn became probate judge of Macomb County, and remained in that position until 1910, when he resigned to accept an appointment as Michigan attorney general. The vacancy in the attorney general position had been caused by the resignation of John E. Bird, who had resigned to accept an appointment to the Michigan Supreme Court.

On September 6, 1912, Governor Fred M. Warner appointed Kuhn to the Michigan Supreme Court to fill a vacancy caused by the death of Justice Charles A. Blair. In November 1912, Kuhn was elected to a full term on the Supreme Court.

He resigned in 1919 and briefly returned to private practice before becoming president of the Michigan Bell Telephone Company in February 1920. Kuhn remained president of the telephone company until his death.

He died on June 16, 1926, at Harper Hospital in Detroit, at the age of 65, after a brief illness. He was buried at Mount Clemens.

Legal offices
Preceded by John E. Bird	Michigan Attorney General; 1910–1912	Succeeded by Roger I. Wykes
