= Laura A. Woodin Le Valley =

American lawyer

Laura Anna Woodin Le Valley
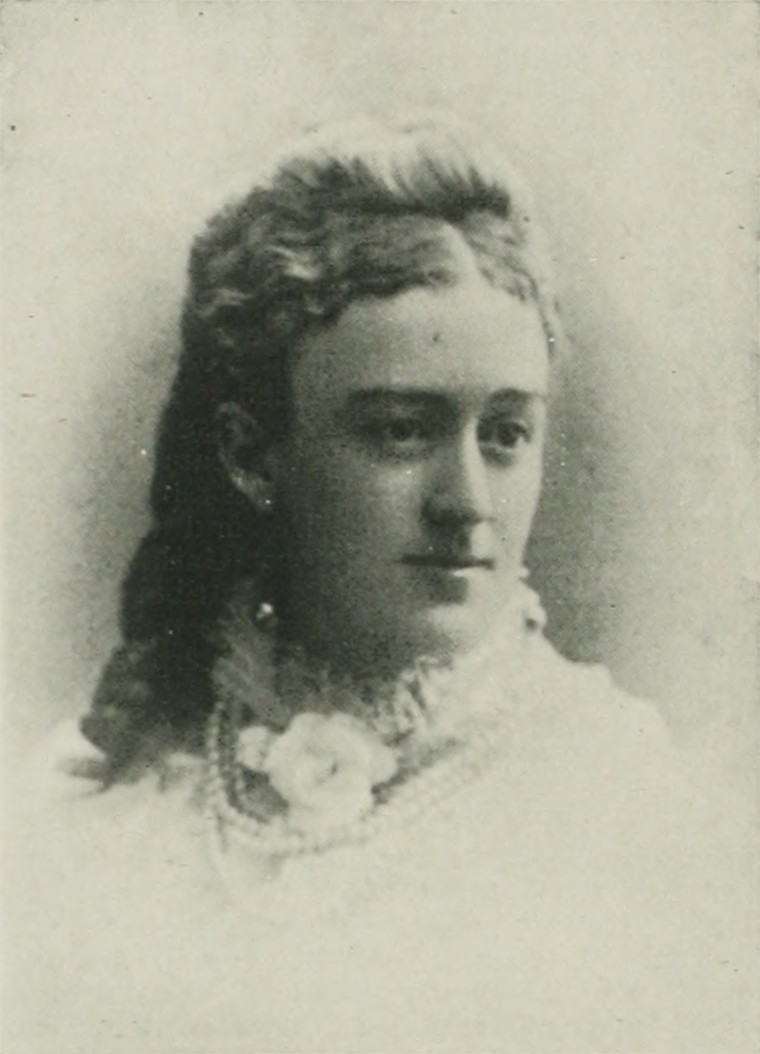
- Born: Laura Anna Woodin; 1853; Granville, New York
- Died: December 9, 1918 (aged 64–65); Pontiac, Michigan
- Education: Falley Seminary; University of Michigan
- Occupation: Lawyer
- Spouse: David W. Le Valley

Laura Anna Woodin Le Valley (1853 – December 9, 1918) was an American lawyer.

== Early life and family ==
Laura Anna Woodin was born in Granville, New York, and was the only daughter of Daniel Woodin (d. 1883) and Sarah J.S. Palmer. Daniel Woodin was born in Oswego County, New York, about the year 1820. He was a tutor in the North Granvill Academy, New York, and in 1845 went to Michigan. He was a teacher for about twenty years and was for many years School Inspector of Macomb County, Michigan. He was elected Justice of Peace for three successive terms, which office he held at the time of his death.

Her girlhood was spent in Romeo, Michigan, where she attended an institute of that place, and afterwards she became a student in Falley Seminary, Fulton, New York. She made a specialty of music, and entered Sherwood's Musical Academy, Lyons, New York, from which she was graduated.

== Career ==
Soon after graduation, Laura A. Woodin Le Valley gained the reputation of a thorough instructor in instrumental music. Finding her services in demand in her father's office, she was appointed a notary public, and assisted him for several years, especially in the prosecution of United States claims. During that time she had much business experience and began the study of stenography. She commenced to study law, and, encouraged by her father, entered the law department of the University of Michigan in the fall of 1880, from which she was graduated in the class of 1882. She was a faithful student, made rapid progress, and had barely entered upon the work of the senior year, when she applied for admission to the bar, stood a rigid examination in open court, and was admitted to practice before the supreme court of Michigan on November 12, 1881.

LeValley was a member of the Congregational Church, and for years was an active worker in the Sunday-school of that denomination.

== Personal life ==
In the law school Laura A. Woodin first met her future husband, David W. LeValley, from the State of New York, then a senior in the law department in the class of 1881. David LeValley opened an office in Saginaw, Michigan, where they resided since their marriage, on December 28, 1882. Later they moved to 31 Lorraine Court, Pontiac, Michigan. For five years after her marriage she gave close attention to office work, her husband attending to matters in court, and they built up a profitable business. Since the birth of her daughter, Florence E., the nature of her employment was somewhat changed She was now the mother of two daughters. Since her marriage she, and her husband who was the author of the historical chart entitled "The Royal Family of England," spent nearly all their spare time in reading, chiefly history.

They had two daughters, Mrs T.W. Widenmann and Sarah Le Valley.

She died at Pontiac, Michigan, on December 9, 1918, aged 65. She was buried in Detroit, Michigan.
