= John Albert Nordberg =

American judge (1926–2021)

Senior Judge of the United States District Court for the Northern District of Illinois
- In office June 18, 1994 – March 12, 2021

Judge of the United States District Court for the Northern District of Illinois
- In office April 21, 1982 – June 18, 1994
- Appointed by: Ronald Reagan
- Preceded by: Bernard Martin Decker
- Succeeded by: Elaine E. Bucklo

Personal details
- Born: June 18, 1926 Evanston, Illinois, U.S.
- Died: March 12, 2021 (aged 94) Northbrook, Illinois, U.S.
- Education: Carleton College; University of Michigan Law School (J.D.)

John Albert Nordberg (June 18, 1926 – March 12, 2021) was a United States district judge of the United States District Court for the Northern District of Illinois.

== Education and career ==
Nordberg was born in Evanston, Illinois in June 1926. He studied at Carleton College and served in the United States Navy during World War II, from 1944 to 1946, as an Electronic Technician Mate Third Class. In 1950, Nordberg received a Juris Doctor from the University of Michigan Law School and thereafter worked in private practice in Chicago, Illinois from 1950 to 1976. He was a Magistrate of the Circuit Court of Cook County, Illinois from 1957 to 1964 and also worked during this period as a district attorney of Wilmette Park, Illinois from 1958 to 1976. Nordberg worked as a village attorney of Glenview, Illinois between 1961 and 1965 and held the same occupation at Morton Grove, Illinois from 1969 to 1974. He was an arbitrator for the American Bar Association from 1970 to 1975. Nordberg began serving as a Judge of the Circuit Court of Cook County, Illinois from 1976 to 1982.

== Federal judicial service ==
On March 11, 1982, President Ronald Reagan nominated Nordberg to a seat on the United States District Court for the Northern District of Illinois that had previously been vacated by Judge Bernard Martin Decker. Nordberg's acceptance to this seat was confirmed by the United States Senate on April 20, 1982, and he received his commission on April 21, 1982. He assumed senior status on June 18, 1994, and continued hearing cases until he took inactive senior status on April 21, 2014. Nordberg died on March 12, 2021, in Northbrook, Illinois, at the age of 94.

== Sources ==
Legal offices
Preceded by Bernard Martin Decker	Judge of the United States District Court for the Northern District of Illinois; 1982–1994	Succeeded by Elaine E. Bucklo
