= Paul D. Borman =

American judge (born 1939)

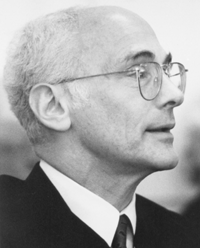

Senior Judge of the United States District Court for the Eastern District of Michigan
- Incumbent
- Assumed office August 1, 2023

Judge of the United States District Court for the Eastern District of Michigan
- In office August 10, 1994 – August 1, 2023
- Appointed by: Bill Clinton
- Preceded by: Stewart Albert Newblatt
- Succeeded by: Robert J. White

Personal details
- Born: Paul David Borman; January 7, 1939 (age 87) Detroit, Michigan, U.S.
- Spouse: Susan Cohen (m. 1964)
- Education: University of Michigan (BA, JD); Yale University (LLM)

Paul David Borman (born January 7, 1939) is a senior United States district judge of the United States District Court for the Eastern District of Michigan, having been appointed in 1994. Borman was earlier an assistant United States attorney, and Special Counsel to the Mayor of Detroit. For 15 years thereafter, he was chief federal defender of the Legal Aid & Defender Association of Detroit from 1979 to 1994. When he was appointed to be a federal judge, he became the first federal defender to be appointed to the federal bench. He was also a professor and assistant dean at Wayne State University Law School, and an adjunct lecturer at the University of Michigan Law School.

== Early life and education ==
Borman was a native of Detroit, Michigan, and his father – Tom Borman – was president of Borman Food Stores, Inc. Borman graduated from Mumford High School in 1956. He received a Bachelor of Arts degree in economics from the University of Michigan in 1959. He later received a Juris Doctor from the University of Michigan Law School in 1962, and a Master of Laws from Yale Law School in 1964. Borman became engaged to Susan Cohen, daughter of Manuel F. Cohen, Commissioner of the Securities and Exchange Commission, in early 1964, and married her in June of that year.

== Career ==
Borman was a staff attorney of the United States Commission on Civil Rights from 1962 to 1963. He was then an assistant United States attorney for the United States Department of Justice from 1964 to 1965. He later acted as Vice President and house counsel for Borman Food Stores, Inc. Borman was a Special Counsel, Mayor's Development Team, Detroit, in 1967. He was also Special Counsel to the Mayor of Detroit, Jerome Cavanagh, from 1967 to 1968. He was an Assistant County Prosecutor, Wayne County, Michigan, from 1974 to 1975. He was Chief Federal Defender, Legal Aid & Defender Association of Detroit, from 1979 to 1994. When he was appointed to be a federal judge, he became the first federal defender to be appointed to the federal bench.

=== Academic career ===
Borman was a professor at Wayne State University Law School from 1968 to 1979. He was an assistant dean at Wayne State University Law School from 1968 to 1973. He was an adjunct lecturer at the University of Michigan Law School from 1981 to 1994.

=== Federal judicial service ===
On March 24, 1994, Borman was nominated by President Bill Clinton to a seat on the United States District Court for the Eastern District of Michigan vacated by Judge Stewart Albert Newblatt. Borman was confirmed by the United States Senate on August 9, 1994, and received his commission on August 10, 1994. He assumed senior status on August 1, 2023.

=== Notable cases ===
Judge Borman presided over the trial of famed lawyer Geoffrey Fieger from April 14, 2008 to June 2, 2008, on charges of violations of the Federal Election Campaign Act, making false statements, and obstruction of justice. Fieger was represented by Gerry Spence and was found not guilty on all charges.

On December 26, 2009, Judge Borman presided over the arraignment of Umar Farouk Abdulmuttalab, who was charged with an attempt to destroy an aircraft and with placing a destructive device in proximity to an aircraft, in connection with Northwest Airlines Flight 253.

On October 5, 2012, Borman issued an injunction against Secretary of State Ruth Johnson's "citizenship checkbox" as a violation of the Equal Protection Clause of the 14th amendment. In his ruling, Borman stated that the checkbox “will create chaos” and cause “irreparable injury to the voting process.”

On September 14, 2018, Borman ruled that the ACLU's lawsuit against Michigan could move forward. The ACLU sued Michigan over its decision to allow faith-based agencies which receive federal funding to deny services to same-sex couples, arguing that Michigan's decision violated the Establishment Clause of the First Amendment. "The plaintiffs have adequately alleged injury in fact for both their Establishment Clause and equal protection claims," wrote Borman. "This injury is at least 'fairly traceable' to the state defendants based on the allegations before the court."

== Publications ==
Borman is the co-author, with Professors Peter Henning, Jerold Israel, and Ellen Podgor, of the casebook White Collar Crime: Law and Practice.

== Awards ==
Borman is a member of the University of Michigan Hall of Fame. He was given the Jewish Federation’s Fred M. Butzel Award for Distinguished Community Service in 2007.

Legal offices
Preceded by Stewart Albert Newblatt	Judge of the United States District Court for the Eastern District of Michigan; 1994–2023	Succeeded by Robert J. White
