= Gordon G. Piche =

United States Coast Guard admiral

Gordon G. Piche is a retired Rear Admiral in the United States Coast Guard.

== Career ==
In 1998, Piche retired from the military. Decorations he received during his career included the Legion of Merit.

== Education ==
- United States Coast Guard Academy, 1964
- University of Michigan, 1970
