= Stewart Albert Newblatt =

American judge (1927–2022)

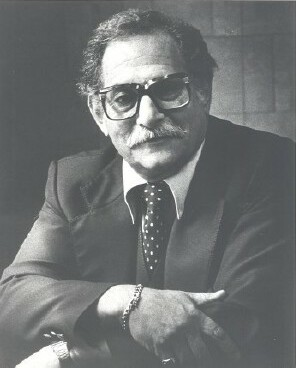

Senior Judge of the United States District Court for the Eastern District of Michigan
- In office December 23, 1993 – December 27, 2022

Judge of the United States District Court for the Eastern District of Michigan
- In office September 26, 1979 – December 23, 1993
- Appointed by: Jimmy Carter
- Preceded by: Seat established by 92 Stat. 1629
- Succeeded by: Paul D. Borman

Personal details
- Born: Stewart Albert Newblatt; December 23, 1927 Detroit, Michigan, U.S.
- Died: December 27, 2022 (aged 95) Detroit, Michigan, U.S.
- Education: University of Michigan (BA, JD)

Stewart Albert Newblatt (December 23, 1927 – December 27, 2022) was a United States district judge of the United States District Court for the Eastern District of Michigan.

== Education and career ==
Newblatt was born on December 23, 1927 in Detroit, Michigan. He was in the United States Army in the aftermath of World War II, from 1946 to 1947. He received a Bachelor of Arts degree from the University of Michigan in 1950 and a Juris Doctor from the University of Michigan Law School in 1952. He was in private practice in Flint, Michigan, from 1953 to 1962. He was a judge of the Seventh Judicial Circuit of Michigan from 1962 to 1970. He was in private practice in Flint from 1970 to 1979.

== Federal judicial service ==
Newblatt was nominated by President Jimmy Carter on May 17, 1979, to the United States District Court for the Eastern District of Michigan, to a new seat created by 92 Stat. 1629. He was confirmed by the United States Senate on September 25, 1979, and received his commission on September 26, 1979. He assumed senior status on December 23, 1993.

== Personal life and death ==
Newblatt died on December 27, 2022, four days after his 95th birthday.

== See also ==
- List of Jewish American jurists

== Sources ==
Legal offices
Preceded by Seat established by 92 Stat. 1629	Judge of the United States District Court for the Eastern District of Michigan; 1979–1993	Succeeded by Paul D. Borman
