= Edmond E. Chang =

American judge (born 1970)

Edmond Chang
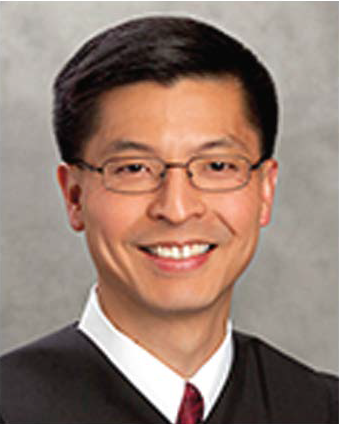

Judge of the United States District Court for the Northern District of Illinois
- Incumbent
- Assumed office December 20, 2010
- Appointed by: Barack Obama
- Preceded by: Elaine E. Bucklo

Personal details
- Born: Edmond E-Min Chang; October 1970 (age 55) New York City, New York, U.S.
- Education: University of Michigan (BSE); Northwestern University (JD)

Edmond E-Min Chang (born October 1970) is a United States district judge of the United States District Court for the Northern District of Illinois.

== Early life and education ==
Chang was born in New York City to Taiwanese American immigrants. He earned a Bachelor of Science in Engineering degree in aerospace engineering in 1991 from the University of Michigan and a Juris Doctor in 1994 from Northwestern University School of Law.

== Career ==
From 1994 until 1995, Chang served as a law clerk for Judge James L. Ryan of the United States Court of Appeals for the Sixth Circuit. From 1995 to 1997, Chang served as a law clerk for Judge Marvin Aspen of the United States District Court for the Northern District of Illinois. From 1997 to 1999, Chang served as an associate at the Chicago headquarters office of the global law firm Sidley Austin. In 1999, Chang became an assistant United States attorney in Chicago, serving as a deputy chief of General Crimes from 2004 until 2005 and as the chief of appeals for the Criminal Division from 2005 to 2010.

=== Federal judicial service ===
In 2009, Chang submitted an application to an Illinois screening committee for one of three federal district judgeship vacancies. On April 21, 2010, President Barack Obama nominated Chang to a federal judgeship to fill the seat vacated by Judge Elaine E. Bucklo, who assumed senior status on October 31, 2009. On December 18, 2010, the United States Senate confirmed Chang by unanimous consent. He received his commission on December 20, 2010.

== See also ==
- List of Asian American jurists

Legal offices
Preceded by Elaine E. Bucklo	Judge of the United States District Court for the Northern District of Illinois; 2010–present	Incumbent
