= Shalina D. Kumar =

American judge (born 1971)

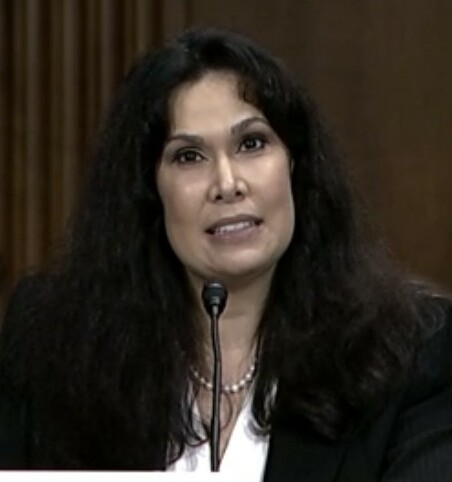

Judge of the United States District Court for the Eastern District of Michigan
- Incumbent
- Assumed office December 21, 2021
- Appointed by: Joe Biden
- Preceded by: Victoria A. Roberts

Chief Judge of the Oakland County Sixth Circuit Court
- In office January 2018 – December 21, 2021
- Appointed by: Michigan Supreme Court
- Succeeded by: Jeffery S. Matis

Judge of the Oakland County Sixth Circuit Court
- In office 2007 – December 21, 2021
- Appointed by: Jennifer Granholm
- Preceded by: Gene Schnelz
- Succeeded by: David M. Cohen

Personal details
- Born: 1971 (age 54–55) Royal Oak, Michigan, U.S.
- Education: University of Michigan (BA); University of Detroit Mercy (JD)

Shalina Deborah Kumar (born 1971) is an American attorney from Michigan who is a United States district judge of the United States District Court for the Eastern District of Michigan.

== Education ==
Kumar received a Bachelor of Arts from the University of Michigan in 1993 and a Juris Doctor from the University of Detroit Mercy School of Law in 1996.

== Career ==
=== Legal and state judicial career ===
Kumar was a civil litigator in private practice from 1997 to 2007, including as an associate with Weiner & Cox P.L.C. from 2004 to 2007 and Sommers, Schwartz, Silver & Schwartz P.C. from 2000 to 2004. From 2007 to 2021, she served as a judge on the Oakland County Sixth Circuit Court, after being appointed by Michigan Governor Jennifer Granholm to fill the vacancy left by the retirement of Judge Gene Schnelz. She was appointed Chief Judge of the Circuit Court by the Michigan Supreme Court in January 2018. Kumar has served as a presiding judge of the Adult Treatment Court, the Chairperson of the Oakland County Criminal Assignment Committee, the bench liaison to the Oakland County Bar Association Circuit Court Committee, a member of the Michigan State Bar Professionalism Committee, and a member of the executive committee of the Michigan Judges' Association.

=== Federal judicial service ===
On June 30, 2021, President Joe Biden announced his intent to nominate Kumar to serve as a United States district judge for the United States District Court for the Eastern District of Michigan. On July 13, 2021, her nomination was sent to the Senate. President Biden nominated Kumar to the seat vacated by Judge Victoria A. Roberts, who assumed senior status on February 24, 2021. A hearing on her nomination before the Senate Judiciary Committee was scheduled to take place on August 11, 2021, but was postponed. On October 6, 2021, a hearing on her nomination was held before the Senate Judiciary Committee. On October 28, 2021, her nomination was reported out of committee by a 12–9–1 vote. On December 17, 2021, the United States Senate invoked cloture on her nomination by a 45–25 vote. Her nomination was confirmed the same day by a 44–25 vote. She received her judicial commission on December 21, 2021. Kumar was sworn into office by Chief Judge Denise Page Hood on December 23, 2021. She is the first federal judge of South Asian descent in Michigan.

== See also ==
- List of Asian American jurists

Legal offices
Preceded by Victoria A. Roberts	Judge of the United States District Court for the Eastern District of Michigan; 2021–present	Incumbent
