= Victoria A. Roberts =

American judge (born 1951)

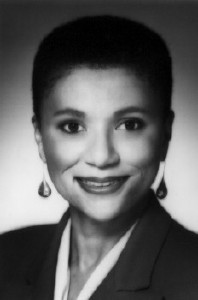

Senior Judge of the United States District Court for the Eastern District of Michigan
- In office February 25, 2021 – September 1, 2023

Judge of the United States District Court for the Eastern District of Michigan
- In office June 29, 1998 – February 25, 2021
- Appointed by: Bill Clinton
- Preceded by: George La Plata
- Succeeded by: Shalina D. Kumar

Personal details
- Born: Victoria Ann Roberts; November 25, 1951 (age 74) Detroit, Michigan, U.S.
- Education: University of Michigan (BA); Northeastern University (JD)

Victoria Ann Roberts (born November 25, 1951) is a former United States district judge of the United States District Court for the Eastern District of Michigan.

== Education and career ==
Roberts was born in Detroit, Michigan. She received her Bachelor of Arts from the University of Michigan in 1973, and her Juris Doctor from Northeastern University School of Law in 1977. Roberts was a research attorney for the Michigan Court of Appeals from 1976 to 1977, and was a legal research and writing teaching fellow at the Detroit College of Law from 1977 to 1978. She was in private practice in Michigan from 1977 to 1985. Roberts was an assistant United States attorney for the Eastern District of Michigan from 1985 to 1988, returning to private practice in Detroit from 1988 to 1998. She was general counsel for Mayor-elect Dennis Archer's transition team from 1993 to 1994.

In 1996 Roberts became the first African-American woman president of the State Bar of Michigan.

== Federal judicial service ==
On July 31, 1997, Roberts was nominated by President Bill Clinton to a seat on the United States District Court for the Eastern District of Michigan vacated by George La Plata who retired on August 3, 1996. She was unanimously confirmed by the United States Senate on June 26, 1998, and received her commission on June 29, 1998. She assumed senior status on February 25, 2021. Roberts retired from active service on September 1, 2023.

=== Notable rulings ===
On February 3, 2017, Roberts ordered the U.S. government to halt enforcement of Donald Trump's 90-day restriction on travel by people from seven Muslim-majority countries if they are lawful, permanent residents of the U.S.

Roberts was a judge in the Arab American Civil Rights League v. Trump lawsuit filed in response to Trump's travel ban. On May 11, 2017, she ordered the Trump administration to turn over a memo by adviser Rudy Giuliani—allegedly written to make the travel order appear that it was not specifically aimed at Muslims—by May 19, 2017.

== See also ==
- List of African-American federal judges
- List of African-American jurists

Legal offices
Preceded by George La Plata	Judge of the United States District Court for the Eastern District of Michigan; 1998–2021	Succeeded by Shalina D. Kumar
