= James B. Currie =

United States Air Force general

James Bradford Currie
- Born: September 18, 1925; Milwaukee, Wisconsin
- Died: September 20, 2009 (aged 84)
- Allegiance: United States of America
- Branch: United States Air Force
- Rank: Major general
- Education: University of Michigan

James Bradford Currie (September 18, 1925 – September 20, 2009) was a major general in the United States Air Force.

== Biography ==
Currie was born in Milwaukee, Wisconsin, in 1925. He attended the University of Wisconsin-Madison and the University of Michigan. Currie died on September 20, 2009.

== Career ==
Currie joined the United States Army Air Corps in 1943. In 1946, he transferred to the United States Army Reserve. He was called to active duty in 1948 and assigned to the 3d Bombardment Group. During the Korean War, he piloted the Douglas B-26 Invader. Following the war, he was assigned to Orly Field and later to Évreux-Fauville Air Base in France. In 1961, he was assigned to the 322d Air Division, where he flew the Lockheed C-130 Hercules during the Congo Crisis. Later he served with the Nineteenth Air Force. During the Vietnam War, he flew the Fairchild C-123 Provider with the 311th Air Commando Squadron. In 1969 he entered the Industrial College of the Armed Forces. Later he served in the Office of the Deputy Chief of Staff of the Air Force.

Awards he received include the Distinguished Flying Cross, the Airman's Medal, the Bronze Star Medal, the Meritorious Service Medal, the Air Medal with two silver oak leaf clusters and two bronze oak leaf clusters, the Joint Service Commendation Medal, the Air Force Commendation Medal, and the Outstanding Unit Award with two oak leaf clusters.
