= Glenn E. Kelley =

American judge (1921–1992)

Glenn E. Kelley (April 25, 1921 – April 11, 1992) was a justice of the Minnesota Supreme Court from 1981 to 1990.

Born in St. Edward, Nebraska, Kelley received a B.S. from Northern State College in Aberdeen, South Dakota, and an LL.B. from the University of Michigan Law School. He served in the United States Army Air Forces in England during World War II. In 1969, Governor Harold LeVander appointed Kelley as a district judge for the Third Judicial District of Minnesota, a position he held until Governor Al Quie appointed him an associate justice of the Minnesota Supreme Court in 1981. Kelley took disability retirement from the court in 1990 because of cancer.
