= Charles A. Blair =

American judge

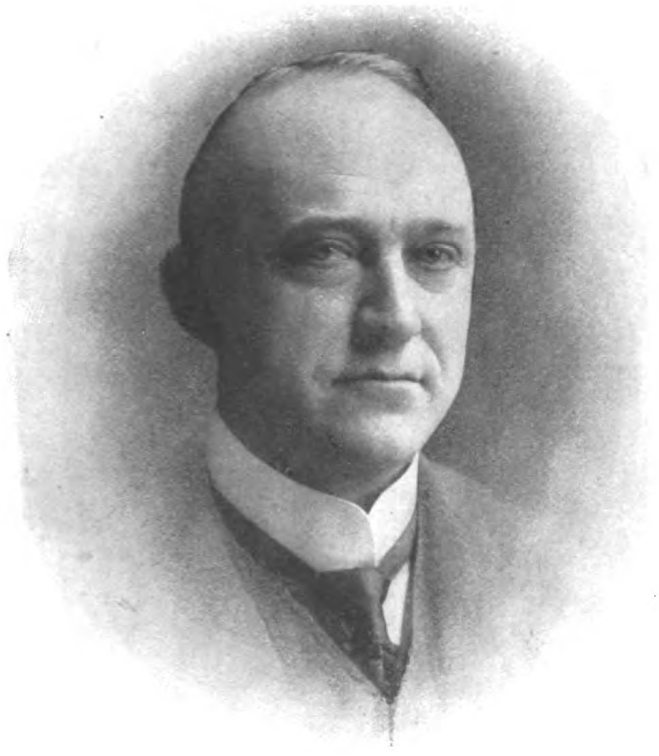
Attorney General Charles A. Blair

Charles A. Blair (1854–1912) was a member of the Michigan Supreme Court from 1905 until 1912.

Blair was born in Jackson, Michigan, the son of Austin Blair. He received a bachelor's degree from the University of Michigan and then studied law at his father's law office. He passed the bar in 1878 and the following year married Effie C. North.

Blair held several public offices including serving as prosecuting attorney for Jackson County. In 1902 he was elected Attorney General of Michigan. He served in this position until he began as justice of the State Supreme Court after the 1904 election.

== Sources ==
- Bio of Blair

Legal offices
Preceded by Horace M. Oren	Michigan Attorney General; 1903–1905	Succeeded by John E. Bird
