= Kris Sarri =

American public official

Assistant Secretary of State for Oceans and International Environmental and Scientific Affairs
- Nominee
- Assumed office TBD
- President: Joe Biden
- Preceded by: Jennifer R. Littlejohn (acting)

Personal details
- Education: Washington University in St. Louis; University of Michigan

Kristen Joan Sarri is the state director of The Nature Conservancy in Massachusetts. She is a former American public official who was the nominee to serve as the Assistant Secretary of State for Oceans and International, Environmental and Scientific Affairs since 2023. She was the president and chief executive officer of the National Marine Sanctuary Foundation from 2016 to 2023.

== Life ==
Sarri received a Bachelor of Arts in biology from Washington University in St. Louis and her Master of Science in natural resources and master of public health from the University of Michigan.

From 1993 to 1994, Sarri worked as an education coordinator for the Cheetah Conservation Fund. She was legislative director for the bipartisan Northeast-Midwest Senate Coalition from 2001 to 2006. From 2006 to 2008, Sarri was the senior policy advisor for U.S. senator Jack Reed. From 2008 to 2010, she worked as a Democratic professional staffer for the United States Senate Committee on Commerce, Science, and Transportation. Sarri served as deputy director of the Office of Policy and Strategic Planning at the United States Department of Commerce from 2010 to 2011. From 2011 to 2014, she was the associate director for legislative affairs at the Office of Management and Budget.

In 2014, she became the principal deputy assistant secretary for policy management and budget at the United States Department of the Interior (DOI). In 2015, she was nominated by U.S. president Barack Obama as the DOI assistant secretary for policy, management, and budget. In 2016, she became the president and chief executive officer of the National Marine Sanctuary Foundation. She led its first corporate partnership program supporting the National Marine Sanctuary, expanding the foundation's budget by over thirty percent. She stepped down from the foundation on January 1, 2023. In November 2023, Sarri was nominated by U.S. president Joe Biden to work as the assistant secretary of state for oceans and international environmental and scientific affairs.

In August 2025, Sarri joined The Nature Conservancy as its Massachusetts State Director.
