= Hala Y. Jarbou =

Iraqi-American judge (born 1971)

Hala Jarbou
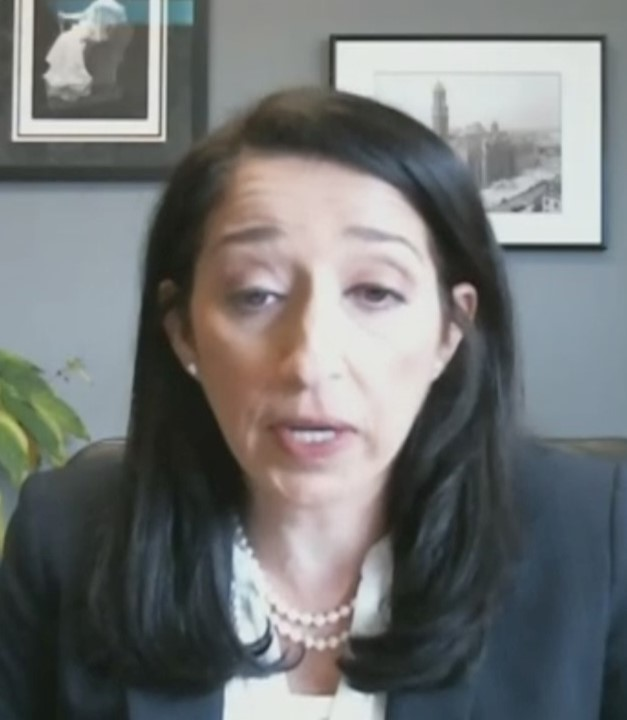

Chief Judge of the United States District Court for the Western District of Michigan
- Incumbent
- Assumed office July 18, 2022
- Preceded by: Robert James Jonker

Judge of the United States District Court for the Western District of Michigan
- Incumbent
- Assumed office September 23, 2020
- Appointed by: Donald Trump
- Preceded by: Robert Holmes Bell

Judge of the Sixth Circuit Court of Michigan
- In office October 20, 2015 – September 23, 2020
- Appointed by: Rick Snyder
- Preceded by: Colleen O'Brien
- Succeeded by: Yasmine Poles

Personal details
- Born: 1971 (age 54–55) Tel Kaif, Iraq
- Education: University of Michigan, Dearborn (BBA); Wayne State University (JD)

Hala Yalda Jarbou (born 1971) is the chief United States district judge of the United States District Court for the Western District of Michigan. She is the first Chaldean federal judge.

== Education ==
Jarbou earned her Bachelor of Business Administration from the University of Michigan–Dearborn, with high distinction, and her Juris Doctor from the Wayne State University Law School.

== Career ==
After graduating from law school, Jarbou served as an assistant prosecuting attorney in the Oakland County Prosecutor's Office, where she prosecuted general felony offenses, homicides, child sexual assault, and high-profile felony cases. In 2010, she became an Assistant United States Attorney for the Eastern District of Michigan, where she prosecuted cases involving drug and firearms offenses, child pornography, and high-level drug trafficking. She was an associate professor of the Paralegal Program at Oakland University from April–July 2005.

=== State judicial service ===
On October 20, 2015, Jarbou was appointed to be a judge on the Oakland County Circuit Court by Michigan Governor Rick Snyder to the vacancy left by Judge Colleen O'Brien, who was appointed to the Michigan Court of Appeals. She was sworn in on January 20, 2016. Her service on the state court terminated when she received her judicial commission as a federal judge.

=== Federal judicial service ===
On March 11, 2020, President Donald Trump announced his intent to nominate Jarbou to serve as a United States district judge of the United States District Court for the Western District of Michigan. On March 18, 2020, her nomination was sent to the Senate. President Trump nominated Jarbou to the seat vacated by Judge Robert Holmes Bell, who assumed senior status on January 31, 2017. A hearing on her nomination before the Senate Judiciary Committee was held on June 24, 2020. On July 30, 2020, her nomination was reported out of committee by a 18–4 vote. On September 9, 2020, the United States Senate invoked cloture on her nomination by an 80–15 vote. On September 10, 2020, her nomination was confirmed by an 83–15 vote. She received her judicial commission on September 23, 2020. She became chief judge on July 18, 2022.

==== Dismissal of charges against police sergeant Brian Keely ====
In May 2025, Jarbou dismissed second-degree murder and involuntary manslaughter charges against former Michigan State Police Sergeant Brian Keely in a high-profile case involving the death of Samuel Sterling. Keely, while serving on a U.S. Marshals Service task force, struck and killed Sterling with an unmarked police vehicle during a pursuit in Kentwood, Michigan, in April 2024. Jarbou ruled that Keely was entitled to immunity under the Supremacy Clause of the U.S. Constitution, stating that the state failed to present sufficient evidence to dispute that Keely acted pursuant to federal law and did no more than what was necessary to apprehend Sterling, who was fleeing and believed to be armed. The decision sparked significant controversy, with Michigan Attorney General Dana Nessel calling it a "miscarriage of justice" and Sterling's family attorney, Ven Johnson, arguing it set a troubling precedent. Nessel's office indicated it was considering appeal options, while a related civil lawsuit against Keely remained pending before Jarbou.

==== Dismissal of charges against Benzie County and deputies ====
In July 2025, Jarbou dismissed a case against Benzie County and four sheriff's deputies--Martin Blank, Troy Packard, James Kosiboski, and Matthew Weaver (no longer a deputy). Plaintiff McCord Henry claimed that the county and these four deputies had violated the rights of his mother, Linda Henry, to equal protection of the laws guaranteed by the Fourteenth Amendment to the United States Constitution, pursuant to 42 U.S.C. § 1983, and their violations of Michigan’s Elliott-Larsen Civil Rights Act, M.C.L. §37.2101, et seq., all of which caused and contributed to her brutal murder on February 4, 2022, by Jeffrey Stratton, who smashed his way into Ms. Henry’s home, bludgeoned her with logs, and set her on fire. The case alleged that the sheriff's office failed to protect women and ignored threats. When dismissing the case, court documents list multiple times that alleged misogyny has shown up in Benzie County's law enforcement, but that the misogyny toward other women does not mean that the dead woman's rights were violated. "The Fourteenth Amendment does not grant every woman indirectly injured by the unequal treatment of one of them a derivative constitutional claim. Plaintiff’s claim fails on the merits."

== Memberships ==
Jarbou is a member of the following:

- State Bar of Michigan, 1997–present
- Michigan Judges Association, 2015–present
- Federal Bar Association (Detroit chapter), 2010–present
- Oakland County Bar Association, 2015–present
- Federalist Society, 2011–present

== Personal life ==
Jarbou was born in 1971 in Tel Keppe (Tel Kaif), Iraq and now resides in West Bloomfield. She is an ethnic Assyrian and belongs to the Chaldean Catholic denomination.

Legal offices
Preceded by Robert Holmes Bell	Judge of the United States District Court for the Western District of Michigan; 2020–present	Incumbent
Preceded by Robert James Jonker	Chief Judge of the United States District Court for the Western District of Michigan; 2022–present	Incumbent
