= University of Detroit Mercy School of Law =

Law school of the University of Detroit Mercy

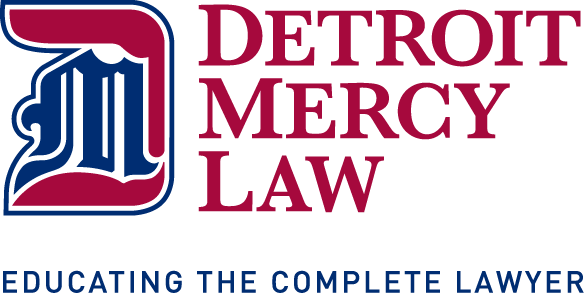
- Parent school: University of Detroit Mercy
- Religious affiliation: Catholic
- Established: 1912; 114 years ago
- School type: Private
- Dean: Nicholas J. Schroeck
- Location: Detroit, Michigan, U.S.
- Enrollment: 612
- Faculty: 23 (full-time), 44 (part-time)
- USNWR ranking: 134th (2025)
- Bar pass rate: 59.23% (2023 first-time takers)

The University of Detroit Mercy School of Law is the law school of the University of Detroit Mercy and is located in Downtown Detroit, Michigan across from the Renaissance Center. Founded in 1912, Detroit Mercy Law is a private Catholic law school and has been ABA-accredited since 1933. The Law School has an annual enrollment of 612 students including 223 International Students, and currently has 67 faculty members (23 full-time, 44 adjunct). The law school has an acceptance rate of 41% as of 2026 and the University of Detroit Mercy School of Law’s 2025 graduates achieved a 93% employment rate in legal and professional positions within 10 months of graduating.

Detroit Mercy Law offers full-time, part-time, and extended part-time JD programs as well as a number of dual degrees, including a J.D./M.B.A. and a Dual J.D. three year program with the University of Windsor allowing students to earn both Canadian and American Juris Doctor degrees. In January 2012, Detroit Mercy Law purchased a 6,000 sq. ft. facility across the street from its campus which will house the numerous clinics operated by the school.

Detroit Mercy Law is one of only two private law schools in Michigan, the other being Cooley Law.

== History ==
Detroit Mercy Law was founded as the University of Detroit Law School in 1912 (the University of Detroit merged with Mercy College of Detroit in 1990 to become the University of Detroit Mercy). It is the oldest private law school in Michigan and it shares the Jesuit and Mercy tradition of education. The historic Renaissance-style campus is located between East Jefferson Avenue and East Larned Street just north of I-375 and is within a short walking distance to the Renaissance Center and numerous state and federal government buildings, including the Third Judicial Circuit Court (Wayne County) and the Federal District Court for the Eastern District of Michigan among others.

== Admissions ==
For the class entering in 2023, Detroit Mercy Law accepted 52.22% of applicants and 37.33% of those accepted enrolled with the average enrollee having a 154 LSAT score and 3.46 undergraduate GPA.

== Bar examination passage ==
In 2023, the overall bar examination passage rate for the law school’s first-time examination takers was 59.23%. The Ultimate Bar Pass Rate, which the ABA defines as the passage rate for graduates who sat for bar examinations within two years of graduating, was 89.52% for the class of 2021.

== Employment ==
For 2022 graduates, 87.29% of the class was employed in a full-time, long-term, bar passage-required or JD advantaged position, including 80.11% of the graduating class securing positions as lawyers, with most employed in firms of 1 to 25 attorneys.

2022 Detroit Mercy Law Employment Statistics
Employment Status	Percentage
Employed - Bar Passage Required	80.11%
Employed - J.D. Advantage	7.18%
Employed - Professional Position	1.66%
Employed - Non-Professional Position	0.55%
Employed - Undeterminable	1.10%
Pursuing Graduate Degree Full Time	1.10%
Unemployed - Start Date Deferred	0.55%
Unemployed - Not Seeking	3.32%
Unemployed - Seeking	3.32%
Employment Status Unknown	1.65%
Total of 181 Graduates

== Costs ==
Tuition and fees at University of Detroit Mercy School of Law for the 2022-23 academic year is $45,824 per year (for 30 credits).

== Academics, publications, and moot court ==
Detroit Mercy Law maintains a core first-year curriculum, consisting of Contracts, Civil Procedure, Property, Torts, Criminal Law, Introduction to Legal Research and Communication and Applied Legal Theory and Analysis (ALTA). Other required courses include Constitutional Law, Evidence, Federal Income Taxation, and Professional Responsibility.

The School's clinical program was founded as the Urban Law Clinic in 1965, and was among the earliest clinics in the nation. Since that time, the program has received numerous awards including the ABA Louis M. Brown Award for Legal Access with Meritorious Recognition in 2012 and the ABA Law Student Division's Judy M. Weightman Memorial Public Interest Award in 2006. Students attend weekly classes that focus on the relevant skills and substantive law and all clinics provide for meaningful guided reflection.

The Law School's main academic publication is the University of Detroit Mercy Law Review, which has contributed to legal scholarship since 1916. This student-led organization publishes four issues a year and hosts an annual symposium in the spring to discuss topics of developing legal significance and scholarly debate. From 2006 to 2010, University of Detroit Mercy Law Review articles had been cited in the opinions of the United States Supreme Court, a United States Circuit Courts of Appeals, and many state supreme courts (including Michigan). The 2022 W&L Law Journal Rankings place the University of Detroit Mercy Law Review as the 304th best law school journal with a score of 5.38 out of 100.

The School of Law hosts both an internal trial and appellate moot court competition annually known as the G. Mennen Williams Moot Court Competition. The school's Moot Court Team competes nationally and has had success both at the regional and national level: it was the National Champion for the 2009 National Invitational Appellate Moot Court Competition and the 2008 McGee Civil Rights National Moot Court Competition.

== Notable alumni ==
Graduates of Detroit Mercy Law include over half of Michigan state prosecutors as well as sitting judges on the U.S. District Courts, the Michigan Supreme Court, and the Michigan Court of Appeals.The School of Law has also graduated over 120 current judges on various district, municipal and probate courts in Michigan. Alumni have also held major elective offices in the state and local governments of Michigan, including three former mayors of the City of Detroit, two former Michigan attorneys general, and a host of other executive positions.

Notable judges from Detroit Mercy Law:

- James M. Alexander (JD, 1973) - retired judge, Michigan's Sixth Judicial Circuit
- Kyra Harris Bolden (JD, 2014) - justice of the Michigan Supreme Court, former Michigan state representative
- Michael F. Cavanagh (JD, 1966) - former justice, Michigan Supreme Court (1983 – 2014)
- Maura D. Corrigan (JD, 1973) - former justice, Michigan Supreme Court (1998 – 2011)
- Patrick J. Duggan (LL.B, 1958) (deceased) - former judge, United States District Court for the Eastern District of Michigan
- Barbara K. Hackett (LL.B, 1950) (deceased) - former judge, United States District Court for the Eastern District of Michigan
- Kathleen Jansen (JD, 1982) - judge, Michigan Court of Appeals
- Thomas G. Kavanagh (LL.B, 1943) (deceased) In 1964, Kavanagh was elected to the Michigan Court of Appeals. From 1969 until 1985, Kavanagh served on the Michigan Supreme Court and was chief justice from 1975 to 1979. Kavanagh was a Democrat. He died in Royal Oak, Michigan of lung cancer.
- Thomas M. Kavanagh (LL.B) (deceased) City attorney and city clerk for Carson City. Kavanagh was a Democrat. He served as the 48th Michigan Attorney General from 1955 to 1957, defeating the incumbent Frank G. Millard in 1954. Thomas Kavanagh went on to serve as a justice of the Michigan Supreme Court from 1958 to 1975 which included eight years as chief justice from 1964 to 1966 from 1971 until his death in 1975. Justice Kavanagh was of no relation to fellow Justice (and successor as Chief Justice) Thomas G. Kavanagh. He died of cancer in Lansing, Michigan.
- Shalina D. Kumar (JD, 1996) - judge, United States District Court for the Eastern District of Michigan
- Theodore Levin (LL.B. 1920; LL.M, 1924) (deceased), former chief judge for the United States District Court for the Eastern District of Michigan (1946-70)
- Paul Maloney (JD, 1975) - judge, United States District Court for the Western District of Michigan
- Greg Mathis (JD, 1987) - former judge of Michigan's 36th District Court (1995–1998), TV judge in Judge Mathis, an arbitration-based reality TV court show
- Christopher M. Murray (JD, 1990) - judge, 1st District Michigan Court of Appeals, former chief judge of the Michigan Court of Claims
- Alice Robie Resnick (JD, 1964) - former justice, Ohio Supreme Court (1989 – 2007)
- James L. Ryan (LL.B, 1957) - inactive senior judge, United States Court of Appeals for the Sixth Circuit
- Thomas P. Thornton (LL.B, 1926) (deceased) - former judge, United States District Court for the Eastern District of Michigan
- Brian K. Zahra (JD, 1987) - justice, Michigan Supreme Court

Notable legislators from Detroit Mercy Law:

- Vanessa Guerra (JD, 2016) - Saginaw County clerk, former state representative for Michigan’s 95th House District (2015 to 2021)

Other Notable Detroit Mercy Law Alumni:

- Peter DeBoer (JD, 1995) (joint degree with University of Windsor) – head coach Dallas Stars
- Frank J. Kelley (LL.B, 1951) (deceased) - former attorney general of Michigan (1961-1999), both the youngest and oldest attorney general in the state's history

Notable Professors:

- Jelani Jefferson Exum - first African American dean of the law school, in 2024 dean of St. John's University School of Law
- Barbara McQuade - former professor (2003 – 2009), former United States Attorney for the Eastern District of Michigan (2010 – 2017)

== See also ==
- Detroit Mercy Law clinics
