= Notre Dame Preparatory School and Marist Academy =

Notre Dame Preparatory School

Location
- 1300 Giddings Road; Pontiac, Michigan 48340; United States; 42°40′26″N 83°15′30″W

Information
- Type: Private, Coeducational
- Motto: "With God we form Christian people, upright citizens, and academic scholars."
- Religious affiliation: Roman Catholic
- Established: 1994
- Oversight: Archdiocese of Detroit
- President: Leon Olszamowski
- Head of school: Andrew Guest
- Grades: K–12
- Campus size: 100 acres
- Colors: Forest green and Vegas Gold
- Slogan: A World of Education
- Song: Notre Dame Our Mother
- Fight song: Notre Dame Victory March
- Athletics conference: Independent
- Nickname: Fighting Irish
- Accreditation: Independent Schools Association of the Central States, North Central Association of Colleges and Schools
- Tuition: $13,000 (pre-K–5), $16,700 (6–8), $18,700 (9–12)
- Affiliation: Society of Mary
- Website: www.ndpma.org

Notre Dame Preparatory School and Marist Academy is a private Catholic K-12 school in Pontiac, Michigan in Metro Detroit. Founded by Marist Fathers and Brothers in 1994. It is a coed, college-preparatory school.

== History ==
Originally the school was the Pontiac Catholic High School, and it was later known as the Oakland Catholic School. It closed at the end of the 1993–1994 school year and immediately reopened as Notre Dame Preparatory. The Marists supported Notre Dame after its rebranding.

A 100-acre (40 ha) campus in an outlying area in Pontiac houses Notre Dame Prep and Marist Academy.

The school opened on August 28, 1994, and its first class graduated in 1995. The middle school opened in August 1996 with an initial enrollment of 162. The lower (elementary) school opened in 2003 and was initially in the former St. Benedict School in Waterford Township; this occurred in a time when other Catholic elementary schools in the area closed. The lower school moved to the common Pontiac campus in 2013. The Notre Dame Prep board acquired the school from the archdiocese in July 2014.

=== Pontiac Catholic High School ===
Pontiac Catholic High School was a Catholic high school in Pontiac, Michigan, United States. Pontiac Catholic was established in 1967 when St. Michael High School (St. Mikes) and St. Frederick High School merged.

Pontiac Catholic High School changed its name to Oakland Catholic High School in 1988. Oakland Catholic High School became Pontiac Notre Dame Prep in 1994, a high school run by the Marist Fathers and Brothers.

== Notable alumni ==
=== Pontiac Catholic High School ===
- Anne Rexford (1979)– Former University of Detroit Mercy Women's Basketball Head Coach.
- Colleen O'Brien (1974) – Judge, Michigan Court of Appeals
