= Matthew Ackerman =

American judge and legal scholar

Judge of the Michigan Court of Appeals
- Incumbent
- Assumed office January 1, 2025
- Preceded by: Kathleen Jansen

Personal details
- Born: Royal Oak, Michigan
- Education: Harvard University (A.B.); London School of Economics (M.Sc.); Columbia Law School (J.D.)

Matthew Ackerman is an American attorney and judge serving on the Michigan Court of Appeals. He was elected in November 2024 and assumed office on January 1, 2025, becoming at age 33 the youngest judge in the court’s history.

== Early life and education ==
Ackerman was born in Royal Oak, Michigan. He graduated cum laude with high honors in economics from Harvard University, earned a master’s degree in economics with merit from the London School of Economics, and received his Juris Doctor degree from Columbia Law School. During law school, he served as an editor on the Columbia Law Review. He was named a James Kent Scholar all three years, earning him the Ruth Bader Ginsburg Prize.

== Legal career ==
Ackerman began his legal career by clerking for Judge Jerry Edwin Smith of the U.S. Court of Appeals for the Fifth Circuit and Judge Michael H. Park of the U.S. Court of Appeals for the Second Circuit.

He then entered private practice, joining his family’s firm, Ackerman & Ackerman, P.C., in Birmingham, Michigan, where he focused on eminent domain and property rights litigation.

Ackerman has also contributed to legal scholarship, authoring several articles on eminent domain and just compensation, and serves as an adjunct professor at Michigan State University College of Law.

== Judicial career ==
In the November 5, 2024, general election, Ackerman was elected to the Michigan Court of Appeals with over 55 percent of the votes.

Ackerman's notable published opinions include:

- In People v. Cao, No. 373185 (Mich. Ct. App. Oct. 6, 2025), Ackerman authored the “landmark” published opinion upholding the constitutionality of Michigan’s anti-hazing statute in a case stemming from the death of a Michigan State University fraternity pledge.
- Ackerman authored McCallum v. M-97 Auto Dealer, Inc., No. 367630 (Mich. Ct. App. Sept. 30, 2025), which involved a used-car dealership that misrepresented the true mileage of a vehicle. The opinion opened with and included quotations from Roald Dahl’s Matilda.
- Ackerman also authored Nonhuman Rights Project, Inc. v. DeYoung Family Zoo, LLC, No. 369247 (Mich. Ct. App. Oct. 17, 2025), in which the Court rejected a habeas corpus petition filed on behalf of seven chimpanzees held at a private zoo in Michigan’s Upper Peninsula. The Court held that chimpanzees are not “persons” entitled to personal-liberty rights under Michigan law and explained that “No exception exists for ‘intelligent’ animals, which in any event has no natural stopping point.”

== Selected writings ==
- Ackerman, Matthew (March 17, 2022). "Reflections on a Qualified (Immunity) Circuit Split". Ackerman & Ackerman.
- Ackerman, Matthew (August 2024). "The Pitfalls of Objectively Measured Just Compensation: When Market Value Isn't Enough" (PDF). Ackerman & Ackerman.
- Ackerman, Alan T.; Ackerman, Matthew (April 2024). "Valuation of Partial Takings" (PDF). The Practical Real Estate Lawyer.
- Ackerman, Matthew; Egalite, Anna J. (November 2017). "A Critical Look at Methodologies Used to Evaluate Charter School Effectiveness". Educational Assessment, Evaluation and Accountability. 29 (4). Springer: 363–393. doi:10.1007/s11092-017-9266-0.
