= Christopher P. Yates =

American judge and attorney

Judge of the Michigan Court of Appeals
- In office 2022–2026
- Appointed by: Gretchen Whitmer
- Preceded by: Jane Beckering

Judge of the Michigan Court of Claims
- In office January 2024 – May 2026
- Appointed by: Michigan Supreme Court

Judge of the Kent County Circuit Court
- In office 2008–2022
- Appointed by: Jennifer Granholm

Personal details
- Education: Kalamazoo College (B.A. 1983) University of Illinois Urbana-Champaign (MBA 1987) University of Illinois College of Law (J.D. 1987)

Christopher Paul Yates is an American judge and attorney in the state of Michigan. He has served as both a trial-level and appellate judge. He was one of Michigan's first business court judges, serving in that role for ten years, and later developing a national presence and influence as a business court judge.

In 2024, he was assigned by the Michigan Supreme Court to the specialized Michigan Court of Claims to handle litigation involving governmental entities. In 2026, he retired from the bench and joined Ven Johnson Law as a senior trial attorney focused on complex civil and appellate litigation.

He served in two prestigious judicial clerkships, has held positions of significance outside of his judgeships, and has received numerous awards as a judge.

== Education ==
Yates received a Bachelor of Arts from Kalamazoo College in 1983. In 1987, he earned a Master of Business Administration from University of Illinois Urbana-Champaign and a Juris Doctor from the University of Illinois College of Law.

== Judicial service ==
In 2008, Michigan Governor Jennifer Granholm appointed Yates as a trial level circuit court judge in the 17th Circuit Court, located in Kent County, Michigan. He was subsequently elected as a judge to the Kent County circuit court. As a trial judge, he presided over civil, criminal, and family law cases.

=== Business court judge ===
On March 1, 2012, Yates was the first judge assigned to manage a specialized business court docket pilot project in the Kent County Circuit Court, one of three Michigan county circuit courts designated in 2011 to operate pilot project business courts. As of January 1, 2013, the pilot projects were replaced by a permanent statute-based set of business court dockets in Michigan circuit courts with three or more judges, with Yates contributing to that business court legislation. Yates continued to serve on the Kent County business court docket until early 2022. He authored well over 300 legal opinions as a business court judge.

Yates also has a national presence as a business court judge. In 2024, he began serving a term as president of the American College of Business Court Judges.

== Appellate judge ==
In 2022, Yates was appointed by Governor Gretchen Whitmer to Michigan's 3rd District Court of Appeals to replace Judge Jane Beckering. Yates successfully ran for election as a 3rd District appellate judge later that year. Yates served on the Michigan Court of Appeals until 2026, when he announced his retirement.

== Court of claims ==
In 2013, Michigan's Legislature created the Court of Claims to resolve major claims against the State of Michigan and its various agencies and personnel. Under that law, the Michigan Supreme Court assigns Michigan Court of Appeals judges to serve on the Court of Claims.

As of January 15, 2024, Yates was assigned by the Michigan Supreme Court to sit as a judge on the Court of Claims for a period covering the remainder of his term as a court of appeals judge, ending on May 1, 2025. He continued as a judge with the Court of Claims into May 2026, retiring as a judge that same month.

== Judicial law clerk ==
Yates served as a judicial law clerk to Chief Judge James P. Churchill of the United States District Court for the Eastern District of Michigan and to Judge Ralph B. Guy Jr. of the United States Court of Appeals for the Sixth Circuit.

== Legal practice ==
As a lawyer, Yates was hired by Stephen J. Markman (later a Michigan Supreme Court justice) to work as a federal prosecutor in the United States Attorney’s Office for the Eastern District of Michigan, located in Detroit, Michigan; was an attorney-advisor in the Office of Legal Counsel at the United States Department of Justice in Washington, D.C.; was a Federal public defender for the Western District of Michigan from 1997 to March 2004 (eventually becoming chief of that office); and, as a private attorney, was a partner in two law firms in Grand Rapids, Michigan.

In 2026, Yates joined Ven Johnson Law as a senior trial attorney in the firm's Kalamazoo office, focusing on complex civil and appellate litigation.

He has served as chair of the Michigan Sentencing Commission.

== Honors ==
Among other honors Yates has received;

- The Judicial Excellence Award from the State Bar of Michigan Litigation Section (2025)
- The Judicial Lifetime Achievement Award from the American Board of Trial Advocates (2022)
- The Judicial Award from the Michigan Defense Trial Counsel (2020)
- The Hilda Gage Judicial Excellence Award from the Michigan Judges Association (2019)
