= Judge Kent =

Judge Kent may refer to:

- Samuel B. Kent (born 1949), judge of the United States District Court for the Southern District of Texas
- W. Wallace Kent (1916–1973), judge of the United States Court of Appeals for the Sixth Circuit
