= Christopher M. Murray =

American judge

Christopher M. Murray is a judge of the 1st District, Michigan Court of Appeals, and the former chief judge of the Michigan Court of Claims. In 1985 he earned an undergraduate degree from Hillsdale College and a JD from the University of Detroit Mercy School of Law in 1990. He previously was a judge on the Wayne Circuit Court, a deputy legal counsel to Governor John M. Engler, an attorney with Keller, Thoma, P.C. in Detroit, chair of the State Board of Ethics, a member on the Board of Law Examiners, served as a member of the Local Government Claims Review Board and the Committee on Model Civil Jury Instructions, and was on the board of directors for the Detroit Metropolitan Bar Association. He is a member of the Board of Advisors for the Michigan Lawyers Division of the Federalist Society.
