= James M. Alexander (judge) =

American judge

Judge, Michigan Sixth Judicial Circuit Court, Oakland County (appointed and then elected)
- In office 2001–2020
- Appointed by: Governor John Engler
- Succeeded by: Michael Warren

Personal details
- Education: Miami University (B.A. 1970), University of Detroit Mercy School of Law (J.D. 1973)

James M. Alexander is a retired American judge who served on Michigan's Sixth Judicial Circuit Court in Oakland County for 19 years. He served in the Family Court for his first nine years, and in the newly created Business Court for his last seven as one of its original judges, writing hundreds of business court legal opinions over that time. He has held significant leadership positions as a judge, and received numerous awards and honors for his public service.

== Judicial service ==
In 2001, Michigan Governor John Engler appointed Alexander to the Circuit Court of Oakland County, a trial level court of general jurisdiction. He was reelected three times, and served on that court from 2001 until his retirement in 2020. He was originally assigned to the Family Court eventually serving as its Presiding Judge and its Chief Judge Pro Tem. Alexander was appointed to the Business Division (Business Court) by Michigan's Supreme Court in 2013 and reappointed in 2019. Alexander retired in 2020, and was succeeded on the Oakland County Business Court by Judge Michael Warren.

The Business Division is a legislatively created specialized business court within each of Michigan's circuit courts having more than three judges. The Business Courts are courts of limited jurisdiction primarily hearing business and commercial disputes before specialized judges. Alexander served on the Oakland County Business Court from its inception in 2013 until his retirement in 2020. He has emphasized the communications and camaraderie among all of the state's business court judges, and publishing business court opinions, as keys to the business court's success. Alexander himself issued hundreds of legal opinions as a business court judge. He has been described as a role model for other judges, and a key to the success of the Oakland County Business Court. The Michigan Court of Appeals has taken note of Alexander's conducting an "extensive jury trial in a temperate and fair manner."

Alexander was president of the Michigan Judges Association in 2010, an organization representing circuit and appellate court judges across Michigan. He was elected chair of the State Bar Judicial Council in 2014. The Judicial Council represents the District Judges Association, the Probate Judges Association, and the Michigan Judges Association. He was among 28 leading lawyers and judges selected to serve on the State Bar of Michigan's Judicial Crossroads Task Force in 2009. He served as vice chair of the Task Force's Structure and Resource Committee. In 2017, he received an Excellence Award from the Michigan Judges Association for "judges who have excelled in trial and docket management, legal scholarship, and contributions to the profession and the community."

== Government, public, and political work ==
Alexander served on Governor Engler's staff as Director of the Governor's Southeast Michigan Office. He was chairman of the Republican Committee of Oakland County. He served as co-chair of the Oakland County Executive's Ethics Commission.

== Legal practice ==
Alexander was in the private practice of law with private law firms from 1971 to 1999, including his own. He became a solo practitioner in 1981 doing commercial collection work, and joined the firm of Foster Swift in 1991, where he was a shareholder, headed its government relations group, and practiced in commercial litigation and arbitration.

After retiring as a judge, Alexander joined the private alternative dispute resolution provider JAMS, providing services as an arbitrator, mediator, and special master/referee.

== Education ==
Alexander received a Bachelor of Arts degree from Miami (Ohio) University in 1970, and a Juris Doctor degree from the University of Detroit Mercy School of Law in 1973.

== Awards and honors ==
Alexander has received the following awards and honors, among others;

- Hilda Gage Judicial Excellence Award, Michigan Judges Association (2017)
- Avern Cohn Lifetime Achievement Award, Jewish Bar Association of Michigan (2025)
- Leader in Law, Michigan Lawyers Weekly (2016)
- Joe D. Sutton Call to Justice Award, Elder Law of Michigan (2015)
- Oakland County, Michigan, Bar Association's Distinguished Public Servant Award (2014)
- Frances Avadenka Memorial Award for Community Service, Oakland County Bar Association (1992)

== Positions and memberships ==
Alexander has held the following positions or memberships, among others;

- President of the Michigan Judges Association (2010)
- Co-chair of the Michigan Judges Association Legislative Committee
- Chair of the State Bar of Michigan's Judicial Council (elected 2014)
- Chair of the State Bar of Michigan Alternative Disputes Resolution Section
- Member of the Judicial Crossroads Task Force, State Bar of Michigan
- Vice-chair of the Judicial Crossroads Task Force Special Committee on Court Structure and Resources
- Chancellor of the Oakland County Bar Association's Inn of Court
- Chair of the Oakland County Bar Association's Legislative Committee
- Member of the Board of Directors of the Jewish Community Relations Council and the Jewish Vocational Service
- Co-chair of the Oakland County Executive's Ethics Commission
