= Janet T. Neff =

American judge (born 1945)

Senior Judge of the United States District Court for the Western District of Michigan
- Incumbent
- Assumed office March 1, 2021

Judge of the United States District Court for the Western District of Michigan
- In office August 6, 2007 – March 1, 2021
- Appointed by: George W. Bush
- Preceded by: David McKeague
- Succeeded by: Jane M. Beckering

Personal details
- Born: Janet Theresa Nebiolo; 1945 (age 80–81) Wilkinsburg, Pennsylvania, U.S.
- Education: University of Pittsburgh (BA); Wayne State University (JD)

Janet Theresa Neff (born 1945) is a senior United States district judge of the United States District Court for the Western District of Michigan.

== Early life and education ==
Neff was born in Wilkinsburg, Pennsylvania. She graduated from University of Pittsburgh with a Bachelor of Arts degree in 1967 and later from Wayne State University Law School with a Juris Doctor in 1970.

== Career ==
Following law school graduation, Neff was an assistant city attorney for the city of Grand Rapids, Michigan, from 1971 to 1973. She was in private practice in Michigan from 1973 to 1978 and from 1980 to 1988. She was a Commissioner, Michigan Supreme Court from 1978 to 1980. She became an assistant United States attorney of the U.S. Attorney's Office, Western District of Michigan in 1980. She was a judge on the Michigan Court of Appeals from 1989 to 2007.

=== Federal judicial service ===
Neff was nominated to the United States District Court for the Western District of Michigan by President George W. Bush on March 19, 2007, to a seat vacated by Judge David McKeague. Despite the blocking of her confirmation vote by U.S. Senator Sam Brownback from Kansas because she had attended a same-sex commitment ceremony, Neff was confirmed by the Senate on July 9, 2007, by an 83–4 vote. She received her commission on August 6, 2007. She assumed senior status on March 1, 2021. Neff took inactive senior status on October 1, 2024.

== Notable cases ==
In 1991, Neff said in the Michigan Court of Appeals that a refusal of lifesaving treatment had to be contemporaneous and informed in the case of Werth v. Taylor.

In 2015, Neff dismissed a lawsuit against Eaton County, Michigan. The lawsuit was brought by the family of two murder victims, Michael and Terri Greene, who were murdered during a home invasion by an Eaton County jail inmate, Christopher Perrien, who was released by the jail each day to go to a work release job at a company that did not exist. The county failed to verify that the company was real before releasing Perrien on work release status.

In 2017, Neff sentenced serial sexual predator and former United States Gymnastics doctor Larry Nassar to 60 years in federal prison.

In September 2019, Neff sentenced child sex trafficker Ricardo Urbina to 40 years in prison.

On June 29, 2020, Neff ruled that Michigan's independent re-districting commission is constitutional, in a blow to the state GOP.

On December 2, 2020, Neff declined to sanction the Trump campaign over an alleged disinformation tactic.

In January 2021, Neff dismissed a lawsuit brought by 10 former Michigan officials who sought to overturn term limits for state offices.

Legal offices
Preceded by David McKeague	Judge of the United States District Court for the Western District of Michigan; 2007–2021	Succeeded by Jane M. Beckering
