= Jane M. Beckering =

American judge (born 1965)

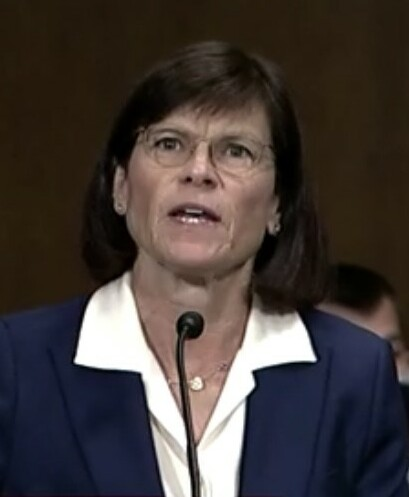

Judge of the United States District Court for the Western District of Michigan
- Incumbent
- Assumed office December 21, 2021
- Appointed by: Joe Biden
- Preceded by: Janet T. Neff

Judge of the Michigan Court of Appeals
- In office September 10, 2007 – December 24, 2021
- Appointed by: Jennifer Granholm
- Preceded by: Janet T. Neff
- Succeeded by: Christopher P. Yates

Personal details
- Born: Jane Marie Buchanan; 1965 (age 60–61) Grand Rapids, Michigan, U.S.
- Party: Democratic
- Education: University of Michigan (BA); University of Wisconsin (JD)

Jane Marie Beckering (née Buchanan, born 1965) is a United States district judge of the United States District Court for the Western District of Michigan. She served as a judge of the 3rd District of the Michigan Court of Appeals from 2007 to 2021.

== Education ==
Beckering received her Bachelor of Arts from the University of Michigan in 1987 and her Juris Doctor from the University of Wisconsin Law School in 1990.

== Legal career ==
Beckering started her career at McDermott, Will & Emery, LLP, in Chicago, Illinois, then returned to Grand Rapids, Michigan, and later founded the law firm of Buchanan & Beckering, PLC. She was a lawyer for 17 years, first in Chicago and then in Grand Rapids before she became a judge in 2007.

In 2006 as a lawyer Beckering sought the Democratic nomination (Note: In Michigan, judicial elections are nonpartisan but candidates are nominated by political parties.) for the Michigan Supreme Court. She made it to the general election ballot but placed a distant third behind incumbents Maura Corrigan and Michael Cavanagh.

== Judicial career ==
=== State court service ===
Beckering was appointed a Judge of the Michigan Court of Appeals by Michigan Governor Jennifer Granholm to replace Judge Janet T. Neff, who was appointed as a federal district court judge. She took office on September 10, 2007. Beckering is vice president of the Grand Rapids Bar Association, with a term set to expire on January 1, 2025. Her service terminated upon her elevation as a federal judge.

=== Federal judicial service ===
On June 30, 2021, President Joe Biden announced his intent to nominate Beckering to serve as a United States district judge of the United States District Court for the Western District of Michigan. On July 13, 2021, her nomination was sent to the Senate. President Biden nominated Beckering to the seat vacated by Judge Janet T. Neff, who assumed senior status on March 1, 2021. A hearing on her nomination before the Senate Judiciary Committee was scheduled to take place on August 11, 2021, but was postponed. On October 6, 2021, a hearing on her nomination was held before the Senate Judiciary Committee. On October 28, 2021, her nomination was reported out of committee by a 12-9–1 vote. On December 17, 2021, the United States Senate invoked cloture on her nomination by a 46–24 vote. Her nomination was confirmed later that day by a 45–25 vote. She received her judicial commission on December 21, 2021.

== Notes ==
Legal offices
| Preceded by Janet T. Neff | Judge of the Michigan Court of Appeals; 2007–2021 | Succeeded by Christopher P. Yates |
| Preceded by Janet T. Neff | Judge of the United States District Court for the Western District of Michigan; 2021–present | Incumbent |
