= Judge Sessions =

Judge Sessions may refer to:

- Clarence W. Sessions (1859–1931), judge of the United States District Court for the Western District of Michigan
- William K. Sessions III (born 1947), judge of the United States District Court for the District of Vermont
- William S. Sessions (1930–2020), judge of the United States District Court for the Western District of Texas
