= Noel Peter Fox =

American judge

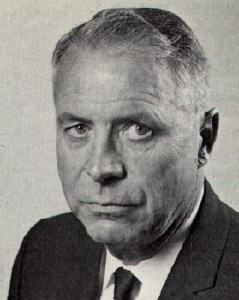

Senior Judge of the United States District Court for the Western District of Michigan
- In office December 31, 1979 – June 3, 1987

Chief Judge of the United States District Court for the Western District of Michigan
- In office 1971–1979
- Preceded by: W. Wallace Kent
- Succeeded by: Wendell Alverson Miles

Judge of the United States District Court for the Western District of Michigan
- In office July 31, 1962 – December 31, 1979
- Appointed by: John F. Kennedy
- Preceded by: Raymond Wesley Starr
- Succeeded by: Richard Alan Enslen

Personal details
- Born: Noel Peter Fox; August 30, 1910 Kalamazoo, Michigan
- Died: June 3, 1987 (aged 76) Grand Rapids, Michigan
- Education: Marquette University (Ph.B.); Marquette University Law School (J.D.)

Noel Peter Fox (August 30, 1910 – June 3, 1987) was a United States district judge of the United States District Court for the Western District of Michigan.

== Education and career ==
Born in Kalamazoo, Michigan, Fox received a Bachelor of Philosophy degree from Marquette University in 1933 and a Juris Doctor from Marquette University Law School in 1935. He was in private practice in Muskegon, Michigan from 1935 to 1937, and was then an assistant prosecuting attorney for Muskegon County, Michigan from 1937 to 1939, thereafter returning to his private practice until 1944. He was in the United States Navy towards the end of World War II, from 1944 to 1946, again returning to private practice from 1946 to 1951. He was a Circuit Judge for the Michigan 14th Judicial Circuit Court from 1951 to 1962.

== Federal judicial service ==
On July 12, 1962, Fox was nominated by President John F. Kennedy to a seat on the United States District Court for the Western District of Michigan vacated by Judge Raymond Wesley Starr. Fox was confirmed by the United States Senate on July 25, 1962, and received his commission on July 31, 1962. He served as Chief Judge from 1971 to 1979, assuming senior status on December 31, 1979. Fox continued to serve in that capacity until his death on June 3, 1987, in Grand Rapids, Michigan.

== Sources ==
Legal offices
Preceded by Raymond Wesley Starr	Judge of the United States District Court for the Western District of Michigan; 1962–1979	Succeeded by Richard Alan Enslen
Preceded by W. Wallace Kent	Chief Judge of the United States District Court for the Western District of Michigan; 1971–1979	Succeeded by Wendell Alverson Miles
