= Raymond Wesley Starr =

American judge

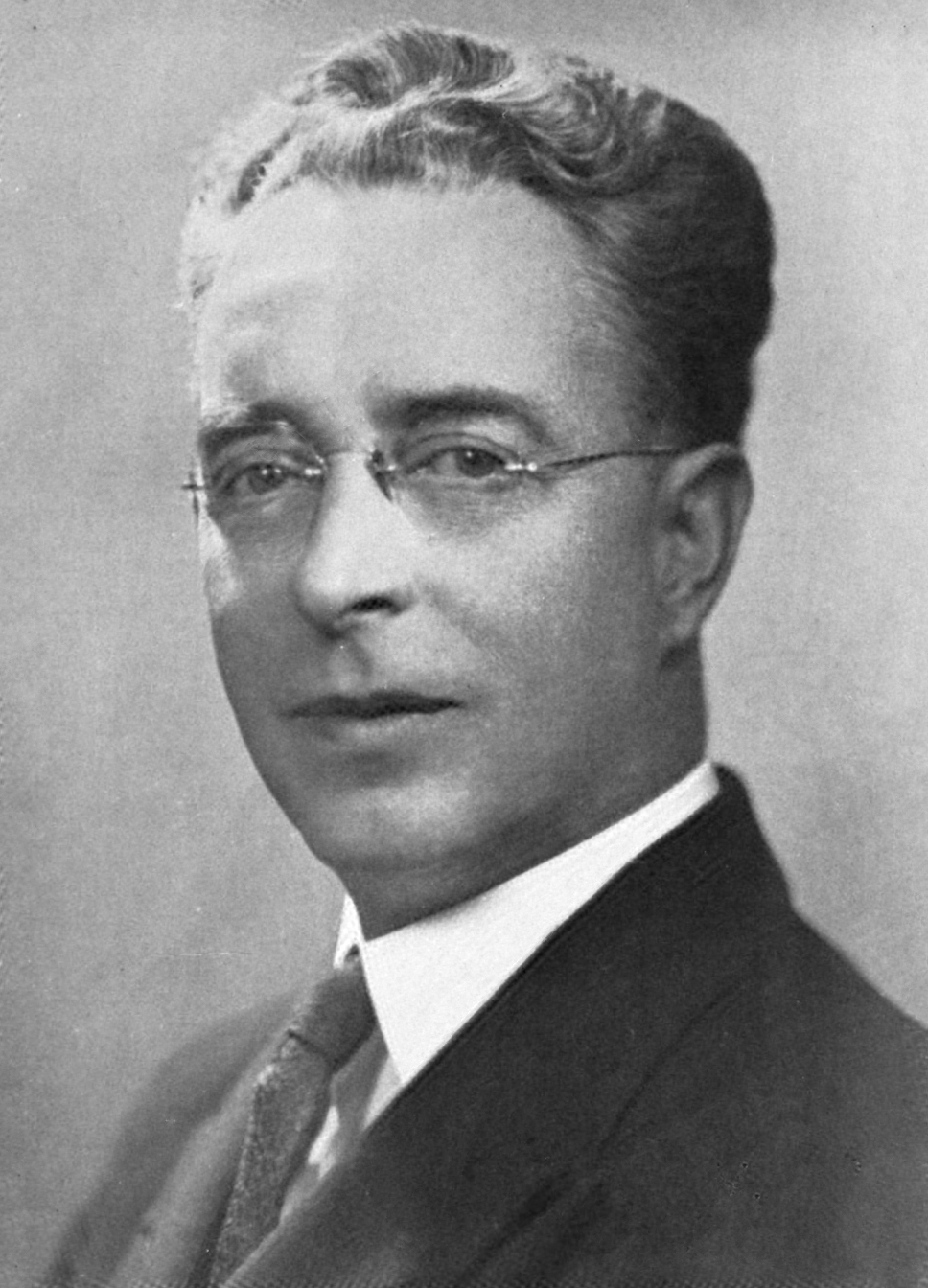

Senior Judge of the United States District Court for the Western District of Michigan
- In office August 15, 1961 – November 2, 1968

Chief Judge of the United States District Court for the Western District of Michigan
- In office 1954–1961
- Preceded by: Office established
- Succeeded by: W. Wallace Kent

Judge of the United States District Court for the Western District of Michigan
- In office July 25, 1946 – August 15, 1961
- Appointed by: Harry S. Truman
- Preceded by: Fred Morton Raymond
- Succeeded by: Noel Peter Fox

Attorney General of Michigan
- In office 1937–1938
- Governor: Frank Murphy
- Preceded by: David H. Crowley
- Succeeded by: Thomas Read

Personal details
- Born: Raymond Wesley Starr; August 24, 1888 Harbor Springs, Michigan
- Died: November 2, 1968 (aged 80)
- Education: University of Michigan Law School (LL.B.)

Raymond Wesley Starr (August 24, 1888 – November 2, 1968) was a United States district judge of the United States District Court for the Western District of Michigan.

== Education and career ==
Born in Harbor Springs, Michigan, Starr received a Bachelor of Laws from the University of Michigan Law School in 1910. He was in private practice in Grand Rapids, Michigan from 1910 to 1937, and was then Attorney General of Michigan from 1937 to 1938, thereafter returning to private practice until 1941. He was a justice of the Michigan Supreme Court from 1941 to 1946.

== Federal judicial service ==
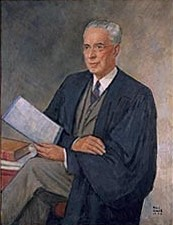
Judicial portrait of Starr, 1983, by Roy C. Gamble.

On July 3, 1946, Starr was nominated by President Harry S. Truman to a seat on the United States District Court for the Western District of Michigan vacated by Judge Fred Morton Raymond. Starr was confirmed by the United States Senate on July 23, 1946, and received his commission on July 25, 1946. He served as Chief Judge from 1954 to 1961, assuming senior status on August 15, 1961. Starr served in that capacity until his death on November 2, 1968.

== Sources ==
Legal offices
Preceded by David H. Crowley	Attorney General of Michigan; 1937–1938	Succeeded by Thomas Read
Preceded by Fred Morton Raymond	Judge of the United States District Court for the Western District of Michigan; 1946–1961	Succeeded by Noel Peter Fox
Preceded by Office established	Chief Judge of the United States District Court for the Western District of Michigan; 1954–1961	Succeeded by W. Wallace Kent
