= Richard Alan Enslen =

American judge (1931-2015)

Senior Judge of the United States District Court for the Western District of Michigan
- In office September 1, 2005 – February 17, 2015

Chief Judge of the United States District Court for the Western District of Michigan
- In office 1995–2001
- Preceded by: Benjamin F. Gibson
- Succeeded by: Robert Holmes Bell

Judge of the United States District Court for the Western District of Michigan
- In office December 21, 1979 – September 1, 2005
- Appointed by: Jimmy Carter
- Preceded by: Noel Peter Fox
- Succeeded by: Paul Lewis Maloney

Personal details
- Born: Richard Alan Enslen; May 28, 1931 Kalamazoo, Michigan
- Died: February 17, 2015 (aged 83) Kalamazoo, Michigan
- Education: Wayne State University Law School (LLB)

Richard Alan Enslen (May 28, 1931 – February 17, 2015) was a United States district judge of the United States District Court for the Western District of Michigan, Southern Division, with chambers in Kalamazoo, Michigan.

== Education and career ==
Born in Kalamazoo, Michigan, Enslen went to Kalamazoo College and then served in the United States Air Force, during the Korean War, from 1951 to 1954, and graduated from Wayne State University Law School with a Bachelor of Laws in 1958. In 1985, Enslen received a Master of Laws from the University of Virginia School of Law. He worked as an assistant trust officer with First National Bank & Trust Company in Kalamazoo in 1958. He served in the United States Peace Corps in Costa Rica from 1965 to 1968. He served as a municipal court judge in Kalamazoo from 1968 to 1969, and as judge of a Michigan District Court from 1969 to 1970. When not in public service, he maintained a private law practice in Kalamazoo. In 1970, Enslen was the Democratic Party candidate for the United States House of Representatives in the race for Michigan's 3rd congressional district seat. He lost in the general election to incumbent Republican Garry E. Brown. He returned to private practice in Kalamazoo from 1970 to 1979.

== Federal judicial service ==
Enslen was nominated by President Jimmy Carter on November 30, 1979, to a seat vacated by Judge Noel Peter Fox on the United States District Court for the Western District of Michigan. He was confirmed by the United States Senate on December 20, 1979, and received his commission on December 21, 1979. Enslen served as Chief Judge of the court from 1995 to 2001, and assumed senior status on September 1, 2005, but stopped hearing cases in 2009. Enslen died on February 17, 2015, in Kalamazoo.

== Sources ==
- Biography at the Sixth Circuit Court of Appeals
- The Political Graveyard
- United States District Court for the Western District of Michigan Official Website

Legal offices
Preceded by Noel Peter Fox	Judge of the United States District Court for the Western District of Michigan; 1979–2005	Succeeded by Paul Lewis Maloney
Preceded by Benjamin F. Gibson	Chief Judge of the United States District Court for the Western District of Michigan; 1995–2001	Succeeded by Robert Holmes Bell
