= Henry Franklin Severens =

American judge (1835–1923)

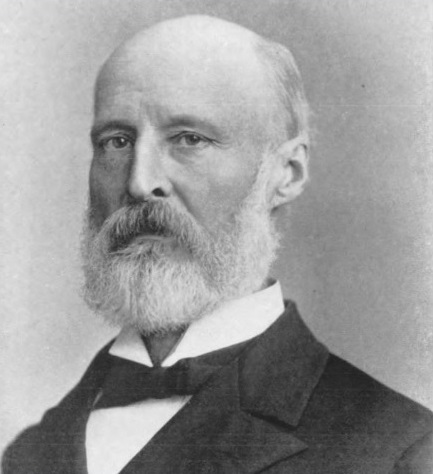
- From 1897's Bench and Bar of Michigan

Judge of the United States Court of Appeals for the Sixth Circuit
- In office February 20, 1900 – October 3, 1911
- Appointed by: William McKinley
- Preceded by: William Howard Taft
- Succeeded by: Arthur Carter Denison

Judge of the United States Circuit Courts for the Sixth Circuit
- In office February 20, 1900 – October 3, 1911
- Appointed by: William McKinley
- Preceded by: William Howard Taft
- Succeeded by: Arthur Carter Denison

Judge of the United States District Court for the Western District of Michigan
- In office May 25, 1886 – March 16, 1900
- Appointed by: Grover Cleveland
- Preceded by: Solomon Lewis Withey
- Succeeded by: George P. Wanty

Personal details
- Born: Henry Franklin Severens; May 11, 1835 Rockingham, Vermont, U.S.
- Died: June 8, 1923 (aged 88) Kalamazoo, Michigan, U.S.
- Resting place: Mountain Home Cemetery, Kalamazoo, Michigan
- Party: Democratic
- Spouse(s): Rhoda Ranney (m. 1858–1862, her death); Sarah (Whittlesey) Ryan (m. 1863–1900, her death)
- Children: 3
- Education: Middlebury College (AB)
- Profession: Attorney

Henry Franklin Severens (May 11, 1835 – June 8, 1923) was a United States circuit judge of the United States Court of Appeals for the Sixth Circuit and the United States Circuit Courts for the Sixth Circuit and previously was a United States district judge of the United States District Court for the Western District of Michigan.

== Education and career ==
Born in Rockingham, Vermont, Severens received an Artium Baccalaureus degree from Middlebury College in 1857 and read law to enter the bar in 1859. He was in private practice in Three Rivers, Michigan from 1860 to 1861. A Democrat in politics, he was prosecuting attorney of St. Joseph County from 1861 to 1864, returning to private practice in Kalamazoo, Michigan from 1865 to 1886. During that time, he was also land developer in Allegan County, Michigan.

== Federal judicial service ==
President Grover Cleveland nominated Severens on May 14, 1886, to a seat on the United States District Court for the Western District of Michigan that Judge Solomon Lewis Withey vacated. The United States Senate confirmed him on May 25, 1886, and he received his commission the same day. His service terminated on March 16, 1900, due to his elevation to the Sixth Circuit.

President William McKinley nominated Severens on February 6, 1900, to a joint seat on the United States Court of Appeals for the Sixth Circuit and the United States Circuit Courts for the Sixth Circuit that Judge William Howard Taft vacated. The Senate confirmed him on February 20, 1900, and received his commission the same day. His service terminated on October 3, 1911, due to his resignation.

== Death ==
Severens died on June 8, 1923, in Kalamazoo.

== Sources ==
Legal offices
Preceded by Solomon Lewis Withey	Judge of the United States District Court for the Western District of Michigan; 1886–1900	Succeeded by George P. Wanty
Preceded by William Howard Taft	Judge of the United States Circuit Courts for the Sixth Circuit; 1900–1911	Succeeded by Arthur Carter Denison
Preceded by William Howard Taft	Judge of the United States Court of Appeals for the Sixth Circuit; 1900–1911	Succeeded by Arthur Carter Denison
