= Solomon Lewis Withey =

American judge

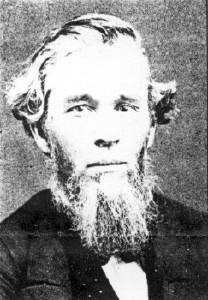

Judge of the United States District Court for the Western District of Michigan
- In office March 11, 1863 – April 25, 1886
- Appointed by: Abraham Lincoln
- Preceded by: Seat established by 12 Stat. 660
- Succeeded by: Henry Franklin Severens

Personal details
- Born: April 21, 1820 St. Albans, Vermont, US
- Died: April 25, 1886 (aged 66) San Diego, California, US
- Party: Republican
- Education: read law
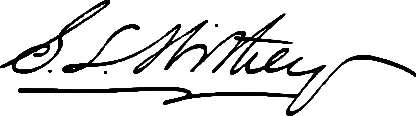
- Signature

Solomon Lewis Withey (April 21, 1820 – April 25, 1886) was a United States district judge of the United States District Court for the Western District of Michigan.

== Education and career ==
Born in St. Albans, Vermont, Withey read law to enter the bar in 1843. He was in private practice in Grand Rapids, Michigan from 1843 to 1863. He was a probate judge for Kent County, Michigan from 1848 to 1852. He was a member of the Michigan Senate from 1861 to 1862, representing the 29th district as a Republican. He served as a delegate to the 1867 Michigan state constitutional convention. In 1873, Withey was appointed to the Michigan constitutional commission.

== Federal judicial service ==
=== District court service ===
Withey was nominated by President Abraham Lincoln on March 10, 1863, to the United States District Court for the Western District of Michigan, to a new seat authorized by 12 Stat. 660. He was confirmed by the United States Senate on March 11, 1863, and received his commission the same day. His service terminated on April 25, 1886, due to his death in San Diego, California.

=== Sixth Circuit consideration ===
President Ulysses S. Grant nominated Withey to the United States Circuit Courts for the Sixth Circuit on December 17, 1869, and he was confirmed by the Senate on December 22, 1869, however he declined the appointment.

== Sources ==
Legal offices
Preceded by Seat established by 12 Stat. 660	Judge of the United States District Court for the Western District of Michigan; 1863–1886	Succeeded by Henry Franklin Severens
