= Albert J. Engel Jr. =

American judge (1924–2013)

Senior Judge of the United States Court of Appeals for the Sixth Circuit
- In office October 1, 1989 – April 5, 2013

Chief Judge of the United States Court of Appeals for the Sixth Circuit
- In office April 1, 1988 – October 1, 1989
- Preceded by: Pierce Lively
- Succeeded by: Gilbert S. Merritt Jr.

Judge of the United States Court of Appeals for the Sixth Circuit
- In office December 19, 1973 – October 1, 1989
- Appointed by: Richard Nixon
- Preceded by: W. Wallace Kent
- Succeeded by: Richard Fred Suhrheinrich

Judge of the United States District Court for the Western District of Michigan
- In office December 18, 1970 – January 4, 1974
- Appointed by: Richard Nixon
- Preceded by: W. Wallace Kent
- Succeeded by: Wendell Alverson Miles

Personal details
- Born: Albert Joseph Engel Jr. March 21, 1924 Lake City, Michigan, U.S.
- Died: April 5, 2013 (aged 89) Grand Rapids, Michigan, U.S.
- Education: University of Michigan (BA, LLB)

Albert Joseph Engel Jr. (March 21, 1924 – April 5, 2013) was a United States circuit judge of the United States Court of Appeals for the Sixth Circuit.

== Education and career ==
Engel was born in Lake City, Michigan, the son of United States Representative Albert J. Engel and Bertha (Bielby) Engel. His early education was obtained in the public schools of Lake City, Muskegon, Michigan, and Washington, D.C. In September 1941, he attended the University of Maryland, College Park, but left in June of the next year and enrolled at the University of Michigan. Engel left the university in February 1943, and entered the United States Army as a private in the infantry but was transferred to the Ordnance Department. He graduated at Aberdeen Proving Ground, Maryland, where he was commissioned as a Second Lieutenant and went on to command his own bomb disposal unit in the European Theatre of World War II for two years, seeing action in England, France, Belgium, and Germany. He was discharged in April 1946, after attaining the rank of Captain and earning five battle stars. After World War II, Engel returned to the University of Michigan and received an Artium Baccalaureus degree in political science. In 1950, he earned his Bachelor of Laws from the University of Michigan Law School where he was a member of Phi Delta Phi and a senior judge in Law School Court. He was admitted to the State Bar of Michigan on May 31, 1951, and to practice before the United States District Court in 1952. After one year in Washington, D.C., as Administrative Assistant to Congresswoman Ruth Thompson, Engel returned to Michigan to practice law in what became the law firm of Engle and Engel until his election as Judge of the 14th Judicial Circuit of Michigan in 1966. He and his father were active in the management of a Christmas tree farm known as Engelwood Plantations in Lake City, Michigan, from his return from the service until 1969.

== Federal judicial service ==
Engel was nominated by President Richard Nixon on December 15, 1970, to a seat on the United States District Court for the Western District of Michigan vacated by Judge W. Wallace Kent. He was confirmed by the United States Senate on December 17, 1970, and received his commission on December 18, 1970. Engel took his oath of office and entered duty on January 21, 1971. His service terminated on January 4, 1974, due to elevation to the Sixth Circuit.

Engel was nominated by President Nixon on December 5, 1973, to a seat on the United States Court of Appeals for the Sixth Circuit vacated by Judge W. Wallace Kent. He was confirmed by the Senate on December 13, 1973, and received his commission on December 19, 1973. He took his oath of office and entered duty on January 4, 1974. He served as Chief Judge from April 1, 1988, to October 1, 1989. He assumed senior status on October 1, 1989. He closed his office on December 31, 2002, and took inactive senior status. His service terminated on April 5, 2013, due to his death in Grand Rapids, Michigan.

== Honor ==
The United States Courts Library in Grand Rapids was officially named the Albert J. Engel United States Courts Library on December 19, 2003.

Legal offices
Preceded by W. Wallace Kent	Judge of the United States District Court for the Western District of Michigan; 1970–1974	Succeeded by Wendell Alverson Miles
Preceded by W. Wallace Kent	Judge of the United States Court of Appeals for the Sixth Circuit; 1973–1989	Succeeded by Richard Fred Suhrheinrich
Preceded by Pierce Lively	Chief Judge of the United States Court of Appeals for the Sixth Circuit; 1988–1989	Succeeded by Gilbert S. Merritt Jr.
