= Robert James Jonker =

American judge (born 1960)

Robert Jonker

Chief Judge of the United States District Court for the Western District of Michigan
- In office July 18, 2015 – July 17, 2022
- Preceded by: Paul Lewis Maloney
- Succeeded by: Hala Y. Jarbou

Judge of the United States District Court for the Western District of Michigan
- Incumbent
- Assumed office July 16, 2007
- Appointed by: George W. Bush
- Preceded by: Gordon Jay Quist

Personal details
- Born: Robert James Jonker; March 9, 1960 (age 66) Holland, Michigan, U.S.
- Education: Calvin College (BA); University of Michigan (JD)

Robert James Jonker (born March 9, 1960) is a United States district judge for the Western District of Michigan, where he served as chief judge from 2015 to 2022.

== Education and career ==
Born in Holland, Michigan, Jonker received a Bachelor of Arts degree from Calvin College in 1982 and a Juris Doctor from the University of Michigan Law School in 1985. He was a law clerk for Judge John F. Feikens of the United States District Court for the Eastern District of Michigan, from 1985 to 1987. He practiced commercial and environmental law at Warner Norcross & Judd, a Grand Rapids-based firm, from 1987 to 2007.

== Federal judicial service ==
President George W. Bush first nominated Jonker to a seat on the United States District Court for the Western District of Michigan, vacated by Gordon Jay Quist, in 2006, but the nomination was returned to the president at the end of the congressional session without a Senate vote. Bush resubmitted the nomination on March 19, 2007. Jonker was confirmed by the United States Senate on July 9, 2007, and received his commission on July 16, 2007. He served as chief judge from July 18, 2015 to July 17, 2022

Legal offices
Preceded by Gordon Jay Quist	Judge of the United States District Court for the Western District of Michigan; 2007–present	Incumbent
Preceded by Paul Lewis Maloney	Chief Judge of the United States District Court for the Western District of Michigan; 2015–2022	Succeeded by Hala Y. Jarbou
