= Courts of Michigan =

Courts of Michigan include:

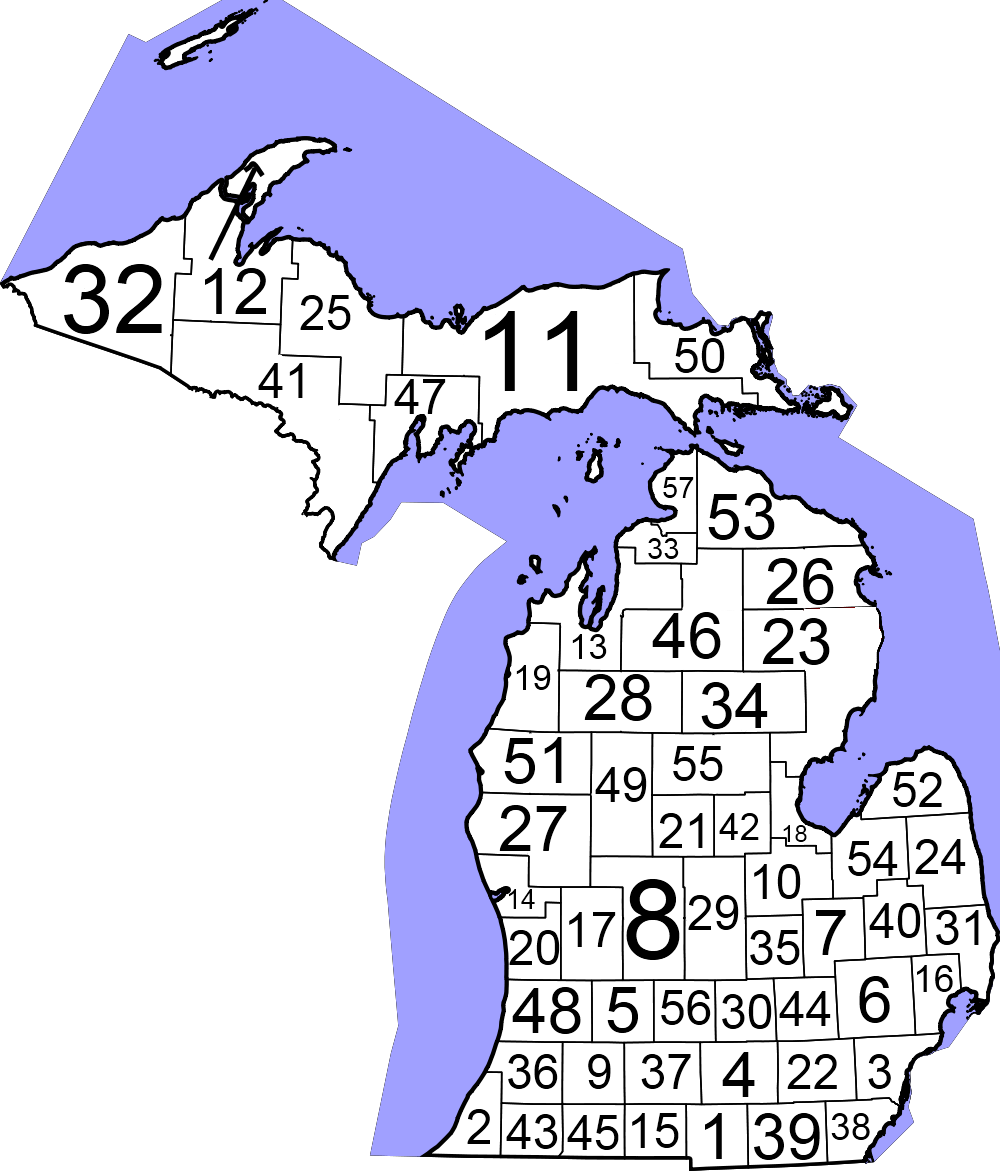
Judicial circuits map

State courts of Michigan

- Michigan Supreme Court

The Supreme Court is Michigan's court of last resort, consisting of seven justices. Each year, the Supreme Court receives over 2,000 applications for leave to appeal from litigants primarily seeking review of decisions by the Michigan Court of Appeals.

The Supreme Court's authority to hear cases is discretionary. The Court grants leave to those cases of greatest complexity and public import, where additional briefing and oral argument are essential to reaching a just outcome.

Each justice is responsible for reviewing each case to determine whether leave should be granted. Cases that are accepted for oral argument may be decided by an order, with or without an opinion. These orders may affirm or reverse the Michigan Court of Appeals, may remand a case to the trial court, or may adopt a correct Court of Appeals opinion.

Cases come before the Court during a term that starts August 1 and runs through July 31 of the following year. The Court hears oral arguments in Lansing beginning in October of each term. Decisions are released throughout the term, following oral arguments.

In addition to its judicial duties, the Supreme Court is responsible for the general administrative supervision of all courts in the state.

The Supreme Court also establishes rules for practice and procedure in all courts.

  - Michigan Court of Appeals

The Michigan Court of Appeals is one of the highest volume intermediate appellate courts in the country. It was created by the 1963 Michigan Constitution and heard its first cases in January 1965. Generally, decisions from final orders of a circuit court, as well as some probate court and agency orders, may be appealed to the court as a matter of right. Other lower court or tribunal decisions may be appealed only by application for leave to appeal, i.e., with permission of the court. The court also has jurisdiction to hear some original actions, such as complaints for mandamus or superintending control against government officers or actions alleging that state law has imposed an unfunded or inadequately funded mandate on local units of government.

The judges of the Court of Appeals sit state-wide, although they are elected or appointed from one of four districts. The districts and their office locations are as follows: District I is based in Detroit, District II is based in Troy, District III is based in Grand Rapids, and District IV is based in Lansing. Hearings are held year-round before three-judge panels in Detroit, Lansing, and Grand Rapids. There is no courtroom at the Troy location. Hearings are also scheduled in Marquette and in a northern Lower Peninsula location in the spring and fall of each year for the convenience of the parties and their attorneys in those areas. Judges are randomly assigned to panels to sit in all courtroom locations so that a variety of judicial viewpoints are considered. At least two of the three judges on a panel must agree on the ruling in a case for it to be binding. Like most appellate courts, the Court of Appeals observes the principle of stare decisis so that the holding in an earlier decision serves as binding precedent in a later appeal. When a panel expresses its disagreement with a prior opinion, the court rules provide a mechanism by which a special seven-judge “conflict panel” may be convened to resolve the conflict between the earlier opinion and the later decision. MCR 7.215(J). Decisions of the court may generally be appealed by leave application to the Michigan Supreme Court.

The Court of Appeals started with only nine judges originally. The number of judgeships steadily increased through legislation over the years to accommodate the court's growing caseload—to 12 in 1969, to 18 in 1974, to 24 in 1988, and to 28 in 1993. Due to decreased filings in recent years, the size of the court was reduced in 2012 to 24 judges, which is to be achieved through attrition over time.

    - Michigan Circuit Courts

In Michigan, the Circuit Court is the trial court with the broadest powers in Michigan. In general, the Circuit Court handles all civil cases with claims of more than $25,000 and all felony criminal cases (cases where the accused, if found guilty, could be sent to prison). The family division of Circuit Court handles all cases regarding divorce, paternity, adoptions, personal protection actions, emancipation of minors, treatment and testing of infectious disease, safe delivery of newborns, name changes, juvenile offenses and delinquency, juvenile guardianship, and child abuse and neglect. In addition, the Circuit Court hears cases appealed from the other trial courts or from administrative agencies. The friend of the court office is part of the family division of the Circuit Court and handles domestic relations cases where minor children are involved.

There are business court dockets in 17 Michigan county circuit courts. These business courts have produced a large number of judicial opinions since their inception.

There are 57 Circuit Courts in Michigan. Circuit Court judges are elected for six-year terms.

      - Michigan District Courts

Michigan District Courts are often called the people's courts. More people have contact with the District Courts than any other court. The District Courts handles most traffic violations, all civil cases with claims up to $25,000, landlord-tenant matters, most traffic tickets, and all misdemeanor criminal cases (generally, cases where the accused, if found guilty, cannot be sentenced to more than one year in jail). In addition, small claims cases are heard by a division of the District Courts. In Michigan, a few municipalities have chosen to retain a municipal court rather than create a District Courts. The municipal courts have limited powers and are located in Grosse Pointe, Grosse Pointe Farms, Grosse Pointe Park, and Grosse Point Shores/Grosse Pointe Woods.

There are approximately 113 district courts in Michigan. District court judges are elected for six-year terms.

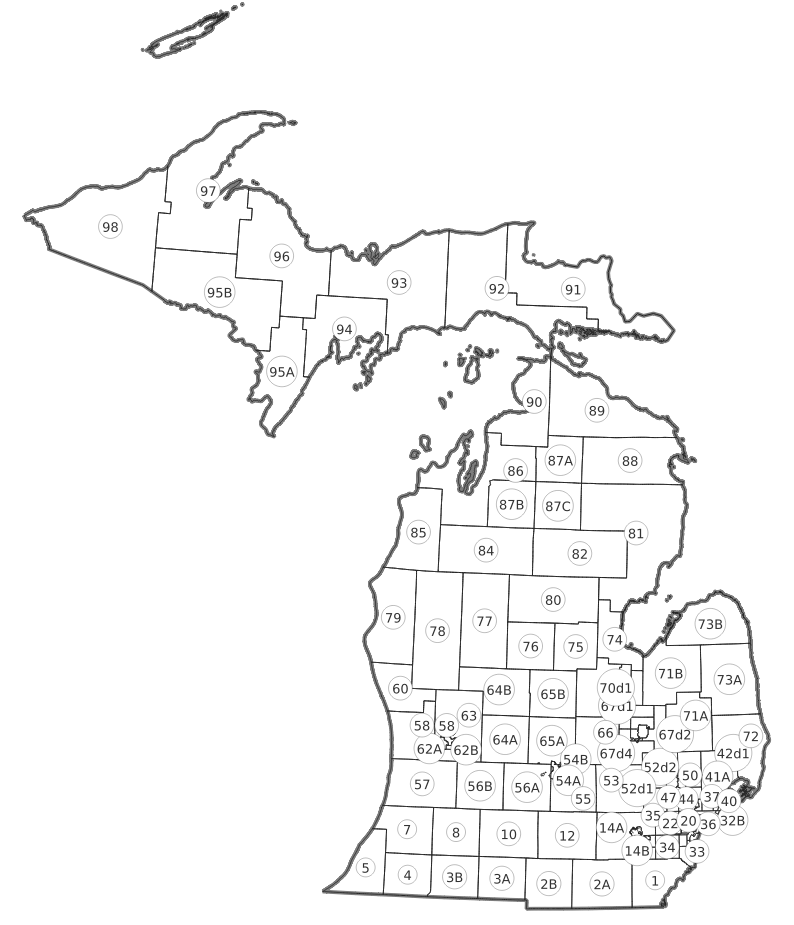
Michigan district courts map

      - Michigan Probate Courts

The Probate Court handles wills, administers estates and trusts, appoints guardians and conservators, and orders treatment for mentally ill and developmentally disabled persons.

There are 78 Probate Courts in Michigan; probate judges are elected for six-year terms.

    - Michigan Court of Claims

Michigan also has a Court of Claims for filing cases against the State of Michigan in which a claim for money damages is made. The Court of Claims is part of the Michigan Court of Appeals as the Supreme Court would select four appellate court judges and its presiding judge. The Court of Claims is a specialized court that handles only claims over $1,000 filed against the State of Michigan or one of its departments. The court would hear Open Meetings, Freedom of Information and Elliott-Larsen Civil Rights acts cases. From the late 1970s to November 12, 2013, the Circuit Court 30th District (Ingham County, home to the capital) acted as the state's courts of claim.

Federal courts located in Michigan

- United States District Court for the Eastern District of Michigan
- United States District Court for the Western District of Michigan

Former federal courts of Michigan

- United States District Court for the District of Michigan (extinct, subdivided on February 24, 1863)

== See also ==
- Judiciary of Michigan
