= Gordon Jay Quist =

American judge (born 1937)

Senior Judge of the United States District Court for the Western District of Michigan
- Incumbent
- Assumed office January 1, 2006

Judge of the United States District Court for the Western District of Michigan
- In office June 30, 1992 – January 1, 2006
- Appointed by: George H. W. Bush
- Preceded by: Seat established by 104 Stat. 5089
- Succeeded by: Robert James Jonker

Personal details
- Born: November 12, 1937 (age 88) Grand Rapids, Michigan, U.S.
- Education: Michigan State University (BA); George Washington University (JD)

Gordon Jay Quist (born November 12, 1937) is a senior United States district judge of the United States District Court for the Western District of Michigan.

== Education and career ==
Quist was born in Grand Rapids, Michigan. He received a Bachelor of Arts degree from Michigan State University in 1959 and a Juris Doctor from George Washington University Law School in 1962. He was in private practice in Washington, D.C. from 1962 to 1964. He was in private practice in Chicago, Illinois from 1964 to 1966 and in Grand Rapids from 1967 to 1992.

=== Federal judicial service ===
On March 20, 1992, Quist was nominated by President George H. W. Bush to a new seat on the United States District Court for the Western District of Michigan created by 104 Stat. 5089. Quist was confirmed by the United States Senate on June 26, 1992, and received his commission on June 30, 1992. He assumed senior status on January 1, 2006. He assumed inactive senior status effective January 1, 2023.

=== Notable opinions ===
In 2009, Quist reversed a ruling he had earlier made denying an American reservist the right to sue for relief after agents of Deutsche Bank had illegally foreclosed on the reservist's house (in violation of the Servicemembers Civil Relief Act). Quist subsequently ruled that punitive damages against Deutsche Bank and its agents were not warranted.

On December 27, 2011, Quist ruled that homeless sex offenders may stay overnight at shelters near schools in Grand Rapids despite a state law prohibiting them from living within 1,000 feet of a school. Quist rejected a request for an injunction to prevent enforcement of provisions of the Sex Offenders Registration Act and student safety zones. He determined that homeless people do not "reside" in emergency shelters if they go there only at night to sleep and have no guarantee of a place to stay on a given night.

On December 18, 2014, a federal appeals panel reversed a previous ruling by Judge Quist that had prevented a man from owning a firearm because he had been committed to a psychiatric hospital on January 2, 1986 following "an emotionally devastating divorce." Tyler was crying non-stop, not sleeping, depressed, and suicidal at this time. A probate court involuntarily committed the then-43-year-old to a treatment facility. Judge Quist originally granted the federal government's request to dismiss Tyler's case, determined that lawmakers purposely made it difficult for those with mental illness in their past, no matter how long ago, to legally own a gun. Recent psychiatric evaluations showed that Tyler, who has no criminal record, isn't a risk to himself or others, and has no substance-abuse issues. The panel said Congress, through its relief-from-disabilities program, has already decided that not all previously committed to a mental institution are so dangerous that they are permanently denied a right to a firearm. Tyler was denied access to relief because the state he lived in had no such programs.

== Sources ==
Legal offices
Preceded by Seat established by 104 Stat. 5089	Judge of the United States District Court for the Western District of Michigan; 1992–2006	Succeeded by Robert James Jonker
