= Douglas Woodruff Hillman =

American judge

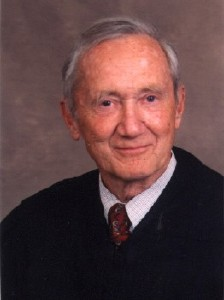

Senior Judge of the United States District Court for the Western District of Michigan
- In office February 15, 1991 – October 1, 2002

Chief Judge of the United States District Court for the Western District of Michigan
- In office 1986–1991
- Preceded by: Wendell Alverson Miles
- Succeeded by: Benjamin F. Gibson

Judge of the United States District Court for the Western District of Michigan
- In office September 26, 1979 – February 15, 1991
- Appointed by: Jimmy Carter
- Preceded by: Seat established by 92 Stat. 1629
- Succeeded by: David McKeague

Personal details
- Born: Douglas Woodruff Hillman; February 15, 1922 Grand Rapids, Michigan
- Died: February 1, 2007 (aged 84) Muskegon, Michigan
- Education: University of Michigan (AB); University of Michigan Law School (LLB)

Douglas Woodruff Hillman (February 15, 1922 – February 1, 2007) was a United States district judge of the United States District Court for the Western District of Michigan.

== Education and career ==
Born in Grand Rapids, Michigan, Hillman was a lieutenant in the United States Army from 1942 to 1945. He received an Artium Baccalaureus degree from the University of Michigan in 1946, and a Bachelor of Laws from the University of Michigan Law School in 1948. He was then in private practice in Grand Rapids until 1979.

== Federal judicial service ==
On July 12, 1979, Hillman was nominated by President Jimmy Carter to a new seat on the United States District Court for the Western District of Michigan created by 92 Stat. 1629. He was confirmed by the United States Senate on September 25, 1979, and received his commission the following day. He served as Chief Judge from 1986 to 1991, assuming senior status on February 15, 1991. Hillman served in that capacity until his retirement from the bench on October 1, 2002.

== Death ==
Hillman died on February 1, 2007, in Muskegon, Michigan.

== Sources ==
Legal offices
Preceded by Seat established by 92 Stat. 1629	Judge of the United States District Court for the Western District of Michigan; 1979–1991	Succeeded by David McKeague
Preceded by Wendell Alverson Miles	Chief Judge of the United States District Court for the Western District of Michigan; 1986–1991	Succeeded by Benjamin F. Gibson
