= David H. Crowley =

American politician and lawyer

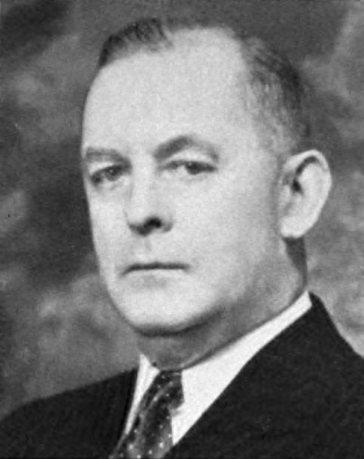

Michigan Attorney General
- In office October 24, 1935 – 1936
- Governor: Frank Fitzgerald
- Preceded by: Harry S. Toy
- Succeeded by: Raymond Wesley Starr

Personal details
- Born: September 5, 1882 Leslie, Michigan
- Died: December 21, 1951 (aged 69) Detroit, Michigan
- Party: Republican
- Education: University of Michigan Law School

David Henry Crowley (September 5, 1882 – December 21, 1951) was a Michigan lawyer and politician.

== Early life and education ==
David H. Crowley was born on September 5, 1882, in Leslie, Michigan, to parents Daniel Crowley and Margaret Crowley. In 1905, David earned a LL.B. from the University of Michigan Law School.

== Career ==
In June 1905, Crowley was admitted to the State Bar of Michigan. Crowley served as Cheboygan County Prosecuting Attorney from 1909 to December 1912. Crowley served as Assistant Michigan Attorney General from January 13, 1913, to November 1, 1916. Crowley served as Michigan Railroad Commissioner from November 10, 1916, until his resignation in January 1917. Crowley resigned to practice law in Detroit as a member of the law firm Monaghan, Monaghan, O'Brien & Crowley, which later became Monaghan, Crowley, Reilly & Kellogg and then became Monaghan, Crowley, Clark & Kellogg. Crowley served as special counsel for Detroit in public utility matters from 1918 to 1933. On April 1, 1935, Crowley was elected as a regent member of University of Michigan board of regents, a position he served in from 1936 to 1943. After the resignation of Michigan Attorney General Harry S. Toy, Crowley was appointed by Governor Frank Fitzgerald to fill the vacancy. In 1936, Crowley tried to keep his position as attorney general, but was defeated in the election.

== Personal life ==
On August 17, 1909, Crowley married Nina C. Barrett in Cheboygan, Michigan. Together, they had two children. Crowley was a member of the Detroit Athletic Club, the Knights of Columbus, and the Elks Lodge.

== Death ==
Crowley died on December 21, 1951, in Detroit. He was buried at Birmingham, Michigan.

Legal offices
Preceded by Harry S. Toy	Michigan Attorney General; 1935–1936	Succeeded by Raymond Wesley Starr
