= United States v. Ogoshi =

United States court case

United States v. Ogoshi is a pending case in the United States District Court for the Western District of Michigan. It is considered part of Project Safe Childhood.

== Overview ==
=== Death of Jordan DeMay ===
Jordan John DeMay (June 7, 2004 – March 25, 2022), a 17-year-old high school student from Marquette, Michigan, was found dead in his bed at his father's home on the morning of March 25, 2022. He had died from a self-inflicted gunshot wound about four hours before his body was discovered.

After their son's death, John and Jennifer learned that he had been a victim of sextortion. A group of men from Nigeria had posed as a young woman on Instagram using the handle dani.robertss. As Dani, they convinced Jordan to send explicit photos of himself to them. After receiving the photos, they threatened to make them public if Jordan did not pay them. When Jordan was unable to pay the $1000 they demanded, he messaged that he would commit suicide because of them. The brothers responded: "Good. Do that fast...Or I'll make you do it...I swear to God."

His parents decided to go public to help raise awareness and garner support for the extradition of those involved.

=== Legal proceedings ===
In May 2023, indictments were issued against Samuel and Samson Ogoshi, brothers from Lagos, Nigeria. They were arrested by Nigerian police in January 2023. On July 20, 2023, a judge ordered that they be turned over to the United States and on August 3, 2023, the Solicitor-General of Nigeria signed the surrender order. The men involved, Samuel Ogoshi (22), and Samson Ogoshi (20), were extradited from Nigeria to face criminal charges in the United States for their role in DeMay's death. A third defendant, Ezekiel Ejeham Robert (19), is currently fighting extradition from Nigeria.

The Ogoshi brothers pled guilty to sexually extorting teenage boys and young men in April 2024, and are currently awaiting sentencing. U.S. attorney for the Western District of Michigan Mark Totten stated: "[The] guilty pleas represent an extraordinary success in the prosecution of international sextortion. These convictions will send a message to criminals in Nigeria and every corner of the globe: working with our partners both here and overseas, we can find you and we can bring you to justice."

==== Charges ====
All three men are charged with conspiracy to sexually exploit minors, which carries a mandatory sentence of 15 years in prison, conspiracy to distribute child pornography, which carries a minimum sentence of 5 years in prison, and conspiracy to commit stalking through the internet, which has no minimum sentence but a maximum sentence of 5 years. Samuel Ogoshi is additionally charged with Sexual Exploitation and Attempted Sexual Exploitation of a Minor Resulting in Death, which carried a mandatory sentence of 30 years in prison with the possibility of a life sentence. Federal prosecutors released a statement saying they will not seek the death penalty.

On September 4, 2024, both Samuel and Samson Ogoshi were sentenced 17.5 years in prison. The third defendant, Ezekiel Robert, is currently appealing his extradition.

== See also ==
- Sextortion
