= Paul Lewis Maloney =

American judge (born 1949)

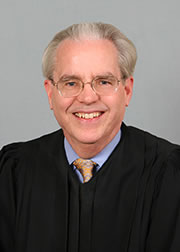

Chief Judge of the United States District Court for the Western District of Michigan
- In office 2008–2015
- Preceded by: Robert Holmes Bell
- Succeeded by: Robert James Jonker

Judge of the United States District Court for the Western District of Michigan
- Incumbent
- Assumed office July 13, 2007
- Appointed by: George W. Bush
- Preceded by: Richard Alan Enslen

Personal details
- Born: December 15, 1949 (age 76) Cleveland, Ohio, U.S.
- Education: Lehigh University (BA); University of Detroit (JD)

Paul Lewis Maloney (born December 15, 1949) is a United States district judge of the United States District Court for the Western District of Michigan.

== Education and career ==
Maloney was born in Cleveland, Ohio. He received a Bachelor of Arts degree from Lehigh University in 1972 and a Juris Doctor from the University of Detroit School of Law in 1975. He was an assistant prosecutor in the Berrien County Prosecutor's Office, Michigan from 1975 to 1981. He was Berrien County Prosecuting Attorney from 1981 to 1989. He was a Deputy Assistant Attorney General of United States Department of Justice Criminal Division from 1989 to 1993. He was Special Assistant to the Director of the Michigan Department of Corrections from 1993 to 1995. He was a judge on Berrien County Trial Court from 1995 to 1996. He was a judge on Berrien County Circuit Court from 1996 to 2007.

=== Federal judicial service ===
On March 19, 2007, Maloney was nominated by President George W. Bush to serve as a United States district judge of the United States District Court for the Western District of Michigan, to a seat vacated by Judge Richard Alan Enslen. He was confirmed by the United States Senate on July 9, 2007, and received his commission on July 13, 2007. He served as chief judge from 2008 to 2015.

== Sources ==
Legal offices
Preceded by Richard Alan Enslen	Judge of the United States District Court for the Western District of Michigan; 2007–present	Incumbent
Preceded by Robert Holmes Bell	Chief Judge of the United States District Court for the Western District of Michigan; 2008–2015	Succeeded by Robert James Jonker
