= Benjamin F. Gibson =

American judge (1931–2021)

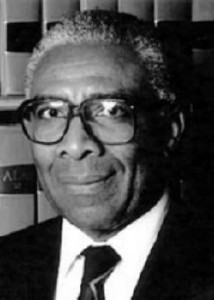

Senior Judge of the United States District Court for the Western District of Michigan
- In office July 13, 1996 – January 31, 1999

Chief Judge of the United States District Court for the Western District of Michigan
- In office 1991–1995
- Preceded by: Douglas Woodruff Hillman
- Succeeded by: Richard Alan Enslen

Judge of the United States District Court for the Western District of Michigan
- In office September 26, 1979 – July 13, 1996
- Appointed by: Jimmy Carter
- Preceded by: Seat established by 92 Stat. 1629
- Succeeded by: Seat abolished pursuant to 104 Stat. 5089

Personal details
- Born: July 13, 1931 Safford, Alabama
- Died: January 13, 2021 (aged 89) Gulfport, Mississippi
- Education: Wayne State University (BS); Detroit College of Law (JD)

Benjamin F. Gibson (July 13, 1931 – January 13, 2021) was a United States district judge of the United States District Court for the Western District of Michigan.

== Education and career ==
Born in Safford, Alabama, Gibson was a private in the United States Army from 1948 to 1950. He received a Bachelor of Science degree from Wayne State University in 1955 and a Juris Doctor from Detroit College of Law (now the Michigan State University College of Law) in 1960. He was an assistant state attorney general of Michigan from 1961 to 1963. He was an assistant prosecutor for Ingham County, Michigan from 1963 to 1964. He was in private practice in Lansing, Michigan from 1964 to 1979, and was a professor at Western Michigan University Cooley Law School in Lansing from 1979 to 1980.

== Federal judicial service ==
On July 12, 1979, Gibson was nominated by President Jimmy Carter to a new seat on the United States District Court for the Western District of Michigan created by 92 Stat. 1629. He was confirmed by the United States Senate on September 25, 1979, and received his commission on September 26, 1979. He served as Chief Judge from 1991 to 1995 and assumed senior status on July 13, 1996. Gibson continued to serve in that capacity until his retirement from the bench on January 31, 1999.

== See also ==
- List of African-American federal judges
- List of African-American jurists

== Sources ==
Legal offices
Preceded by Seat established by 92 Stat. 1629	Judge of the United States District Court for the Western District of Michigan; 1979–1996	Succeeded by Seat abolished pursuant to 104 Stat. 5089
Preceded by Douglas Woodruff Hillman	Chief Judge of the United States District Court for the Western District of Michigan; 1991–1995	Succeeded by Richard Alan Enslen
