= Wendell Alverson Miles =

American judge (1916–2013)

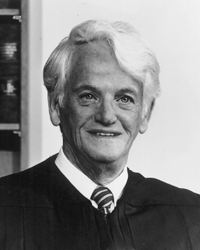

Senior Judge of the United States District Court for the Western District of Michigan
- In office May 6, 1986 – July 30, 2013

Chief Judge of the United States District Court for the Western District of Michigan
- In office 1979–1986
- Preceded by: Noel Peter Fox
- Succeeded by: Douglas Woodruff Hillman

Judge of the United States District Court for the Western District of Michigan
- In office April 17, 1974 – May 6, 1986
- Appointed by: Richard Nixon
- Preceded by: Albert J. Engel Jr.
- Succeeded by: Robert Holmes Bell

Personal details
- Born: Wendell Alverson Miles; April 17, 1916 Holland, Michigan, U.S.
- Died: July 30, 2013 (aged 97) Grand Rapids, Michigan, U.S.
- Education: Hope College (A.B.); University of Wyoming (M.A.); University of Michigan Law School (J.D.)

Wendell Alverson Miles (April 17, 1916 – July 31, 2013) was a United States district judge of the United States District Court for the Western District of Michigan.

== Education and career ==
Born in Holland, Michigan, Miles received an Artium Baccalaureus degree from Hope College in 1938, a Master of Arts from the University of Wyoming in 1939, and a Juris Doctor from the University of Michigan Law School in 1942. He joined the United States Army and reported for duty at Fort Riley, Kansas as a private in the fall of 1942. He then served in Europe during World War II with the 493rd Military Police Escort Guard Company as a captain, where his unit transported German prisoners of war. He also served as a lawyer trying cases in the Judge Advocate General's Corps in Marseilles and Strasbourg, France.

After the war, he was an Instructor at Hope College while in private practice in Grand Rapids, Michigan from 1948 to 1953, also serving as a prosecuting attorney of Ottawa County, Michigan from 1948 to 1953. He was the United States Attorney for the Western District of Michigan from 1953 to 1960. After running unsuccessfully for Michigan Attorney General as the Republican nominee in 1960, he returned to private practice in Grand Rapids from 1961 to 1970. He was a Circuit Judge for the 20th Judicial Circuit of Michigan from 1970 to 1974.

== Federal judicial service ==
On March 29, 1974, Miles was nominated by President Richard Nixon to a seat on the United States District Court for the Western District of Michigan vacated by Judge Albert J. Engel Jr. Miles was confirmed by the United States Senate on April 10, 1974, and received his commission on April 17, 1974. He served as Chief Judge from 1979 to 1986, assuming senior status on May 6, 1986. He was a judge of the United States Foreign Intelligence Surveillance Court from 1989 to 1996. His service terminated on July 31, 2013, due to his death in Grand Rapids.

== Sources ==
- Google Books
- Sixth Circuit Court, History

Legal offices
| Preceded by Albert J. Engel Jr. | Judge of the United States District Court for the Western District of Michigan; 1974–1986 | Succeeded by Robert Holmes Bell |
| Preceded by Noel Peter Fox | Chief Judge of the United States District Court for the Western District of Michigan; 1979–1986 | Succeeded by Douglas Woodruff Hillman |
