= Robert Holmes Bell =

American lawyer and judge (1944–2023)

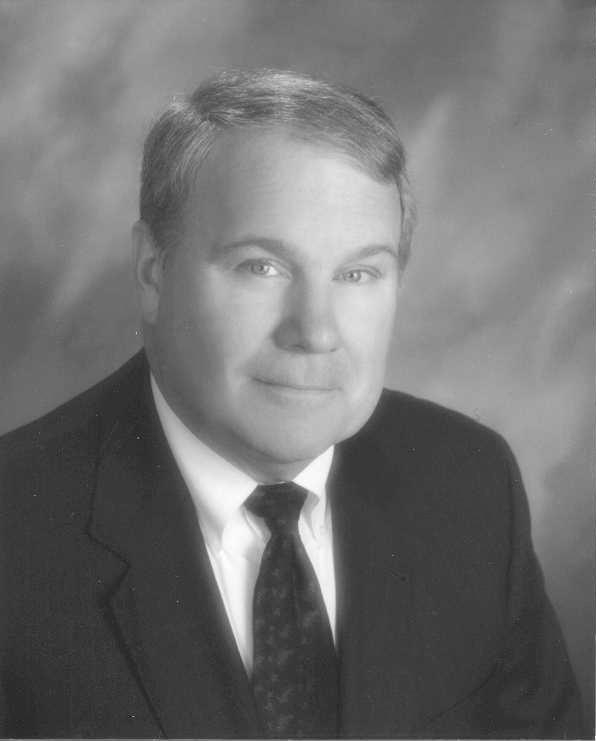
- Bell, c. 2006

Senior Judge of the United States District Court for the Western District of Michigan
- In office January 31, 2017 – June 8, 2023

Chief Judge of the United States District Court for the Western District of Michigan
- In office 2001–2008
- Preceded by: Richard Alan Enslen
- Succeeded by: Paul Lewis Maloney

Judge of the United States District Court for the Western District of Michigan
- In office July 2, 1987 – January 31, 2017
- Appointed by: Ronald Reagan
- Preceded by: Wendell Alverson Miles
- Succeeded by: Hala Y. Jarbou

Personal details
- Born: April 19, 1944 Lansing, Michigan, U.S.
- Died: June 8, 2023 (aged 79) East Grand Rapids, Michigan, U.S.
- Education: Wheaton College (BA); Wayne State University (JD)

Robert Holmes Bell (April 19, 1944 – June 8, 2023) was an American lawyer and United States district judge of the United States District Court for the Western District of Michigan from 1987 to 2017. Before assuming the role, he worked as an attorney and judge in Michigan. Bell became a senior judge in 2017, a role which he served until his death in 2023. His son is Rob Bell, the founder of the Mars Hill Bible Church.

== Education and career ==
Bell received a Bachelor of Arts degree from Wheaton College in 1966. At Wheaton, Bell lettered in track each year. Bell received his Juris Doctor from Wayne State University Law School in 1969. He was an assistant county prosecuting attorney for Ingham County, Michigan from 1969 to 1973 and then became a judge, first on the Ingham District Court in Mason, Michigan from 1973 to 1979, then on the Ingham County Circuit Court in Lansing from 1979 to 1987.

=== Federal judicial service ===
On March 11, 1987, Bell was nominated by President Ronald Reagan to a seat on the United States District Court for the Western District of Michigan vacated by Judge Wendell Alverson Miles. Bell was confirmed by the United States Senate on July 1, 1987 and received his commission the following day. He served as Chief Judge from 2001 to 2008. He assumed inactive senior status on January 31, 2017.

Chief Justice John Roberts appointed Bell to serve as chairman of the criminal law committee of the Judicial Conference of the United States. In that post, Bell wrote a letter to the Senate Judiciary Committee in 2013 opposing mandatory minimum sentences, saying they produce "unjust results" and waste public funds.

One notable case during Bell's federal judicial service was the 2002 trial of Marvin Gabrion, where Bell ordered a death sentence for Gabrion after the U.S. Justice Department told prosecutors to ask jurors for the death sentence, to which the jurors agreed. Gabrion remains on death row as of 2023.

Bell also took actions on protecting Lake Michigan sand dunes, supervising the cleanup of the Kalamazoo River, and dismantling Holland, Michigan's street gang Latin Kings.

== Personal life ==
Born in Lansing, Michigan, on April 19, 1944, to Preston and Eileen (née Holmes), Bell was raised in nearby Williamston and graduated from Okemos High School in 1962. His father died of war-related illness, lymphoma, when he was eight years old.

Bell met his wife, Helen, while both were students at Wheaton. They had three children. Their son, Rob Bell, is the founding pastor of the Mars Hill Bible Church megachurch. Bell taught at a Sunday school in upper Michigan.

Bell died in East Grand Rapids, Michigan, on June 8, 2023, at age 79.

== Notes ==
Legal offices
Preceded by Wendell Alverson Miles	Judge of the United States District Court for the Western District of Michigan; 1987–2017	Succeeded by Hala Y. Jarbou
Preceded by Richard Alan Enslen	Chief Judge of the United States District Court for the Western District of Michigan; 2001–2008	Succeeded by Paul Lewis Maloney
