= Kathleen Jansen =

American judge

Kathleen Jansen (born November 7, 1948) is a judge of the Michigan Court of Appeals.

Jansen earned a law degree from the University of Detroit Law School. In addition, she earned a Bachelor's degree from Michigan State University.

Jansen was appointed to the Michigan Court of Appeals in 1989 by the then-governor James J. Blanchard.

Prior to her appointment, she served on the Macomb County Circuit Court. She also earlier served on the Macomb County Probate Court. When she was elected to that court in 1984 she became the first woman to serve on it. She also previously worked as a private practice attorney.

== Sources ==
- appeals court bio of Jansen
