= Arthur Carter Denison =

American judge (1861–1942)

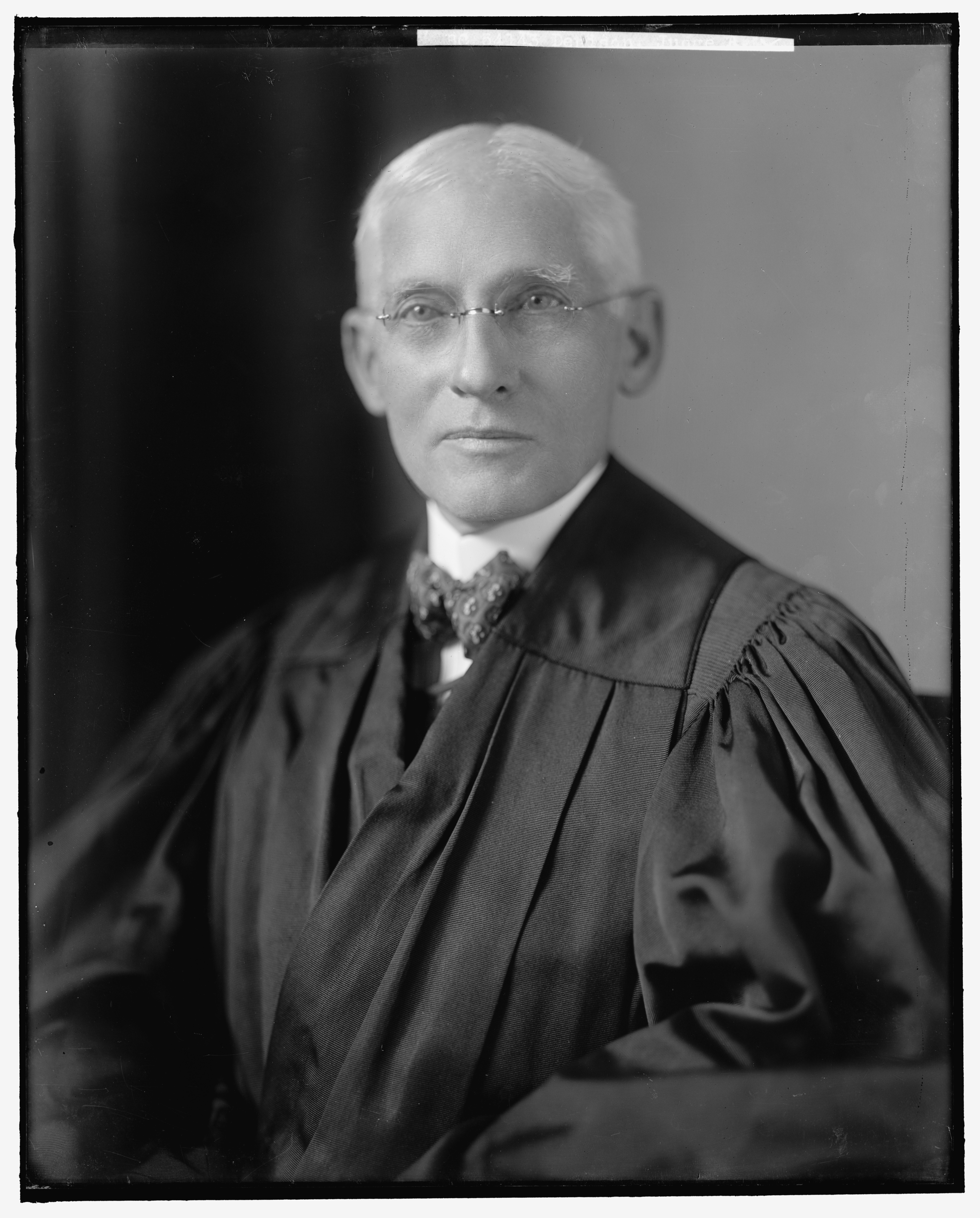

Judge of the United States Court of Appeals for the Sixth Circuit
- In office March 2, 1911 – December 31, 1931
- Appointed by: William Howard Taft
- Preceded by: Henry Franklin Severens
- Succeeded by: Charles C. Simons

Judge of the United States Circuit Courts for the Sixth Circuit
- In office March 2, 1911 – December 31, 1911
- Appointed by: William Howard Taft
- Preceded by: Henry Franklin Severens
- Succeeded by: Seat abolished

Judge of the United States District Court for the Western District of Michigan
- In office January 31, 1910 – October 3, 1911
- Appointed by: William Howard Taft
- Preceded by: Loyal Edwin Knappen
- Succeeded by: Clarence W. Sessions

Personal details
- Born: Arthur Carter Denison; November 10, 1861 Grand Rapids, Michigan, U.S.
- Died: May 27, 1942 (aged 80) Shaker Heights, Ohio, U.S.
- Education: University of Michigan (BA)

Arthur Carter Denison (November 10, 1861 – May 27, 1942) was a United States circuit judge of the United States Court of Appeals for the Sixth Circuit and the United States Circuit Courts for the Sixth Circuit and previously was a United States district judge of the United States District Court for the Western District of Michigan.

== Education and career ==
Born in Grand Rapids, Michigan, Denison received a Bachelor of Arts degree from the University of Michigan in 1883. He was in private practice in Grand Rapids from 1883 to 1910.

== Federal judicial service ==
Denison was nominated by President William Howard Taft on January 17, 1910, to a seat on the United States District Court for the Western District of Michigan vacated by Judge Loyal Edwin Knappen. He was confirmed by the United States Senate on January 31, 1910, and received his commission the same day. His service terminated on October 3, 1911, due to his elevation to the Sixth Circuit.

Denison was nominated by President Taft on February 25, 1911, to a joint seat on the United States Court of Appeals for the Sixth Circuit and the United States Circuit Courts for the Sixth Circuit vacated by Judge Henry Franklin Severens. He was confirmed by the Senate on March 2, 1911, and received his commission the same day. On December 31, 1911, the Circuit Courts were abolished and he thereafter served only on the Court of Appeals. He was a member of the Conference of Senior Circuit Judges (now the Judicial Conference of the United States) from 1924 to 1931. His service terminated on December 31, 1931, due to his resignation. He was the last appeals court judge who continued to serve in active service appointed by President Taft.

== Later career and death ==
Following his resignation from the federal bench, Denison returned to private practice in Cleveland, Ohio from 1932 to 1942. He died on May 27, 1942, in Shaker Heights, Ohio.

== Sources ==
Legal offices
Preceded by Loyal Edwin Knappen	Judge of the United States District Court for the Western District of Michigan; 1910–1911	Succeeded by Clarence W. Sessions
Preceded by Henry Franklin Severens	Judge of the United States Circuit Courts for the Sixth Circuit; 1911	Succeeded by Seat abolished
Preceded by Henry Franklin Severens	Judge of the United States Court of Appeals for the Sixth Circuit; 1911–1931	Succeeded by Charles C. Simons
