= Harry S. Toy =

American judge (1892–1955)

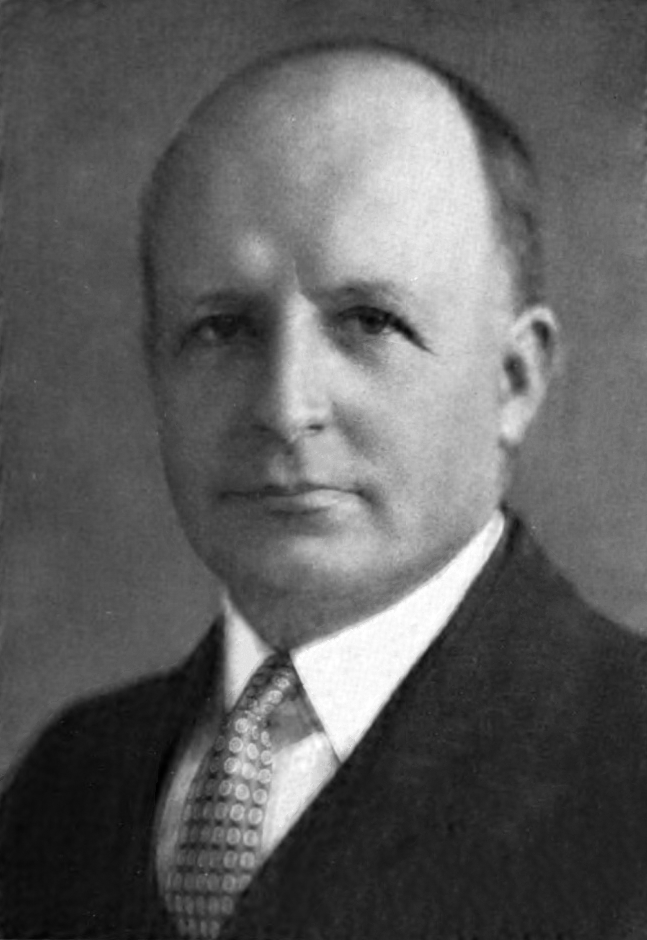
- Toy in 1937

19th Commissioner of the Detroit Police Department
- In office January 1, 1948 – January 2, 1950
- Preceded by: John F. Ballenger
- Succeeded by: George F. Boos

Justice of the Michigan Supreme Court
- In office 1935–1937
- Preceded by: Nelson Sharpe
- Succeeded by: Bert D. Chandler

Michigan Attorney General
- In office 1935
- Governor: Frank Fitzgerald
- Preceded by: Patrick H. O'Brien
- Succeeded by: David H. Crowley

Wayne County Prosecutor
- In office 1930–1935

Personal details
- Born: 1892
- Died: 1955 (age 63)
- Political party: Republican
- Occupation: Politician, prosecutor, judge

Harry S. Toy (1892 – September 9, 1955) was an American politician, prosecutor, and judge.

He served as Wayne County prosecutor (1930–1935), Michigan attorney general (1935), and a justice of the Michigan Supreme Court (1935–1937).

In November 1936, Toy, a Republican, was defeated for reelection to the Michigan Supreme Court by Democrat Bert D. Chandler, by a vote of 862,147 to 755,227. Toy later served as the commissioner of the Detroit Police Department from 1948 through 1950.

Both as a prosecutor and as police commissioner, Toy subscribed to McCarthyism and sought to root out and destroy communism, which Toy blamed for labor activism and various societal ills.

Toy planned to run for Governor of Michigan, but died of a heart attack at age 63 in Detroit.

Legal offices
Preceded by Patrick H. O’Brien	Michigan Attorney General; 1935	Succeeded by David H. Crowley
Preceded by Nelson Sharpe	Justice of the Michigan Supreme Court; 1935–1937	Succeeded by Bert D. Chandler
