= Safford, Alabama =

Unincorporated community in Alabama, United States

- Unincorporated community
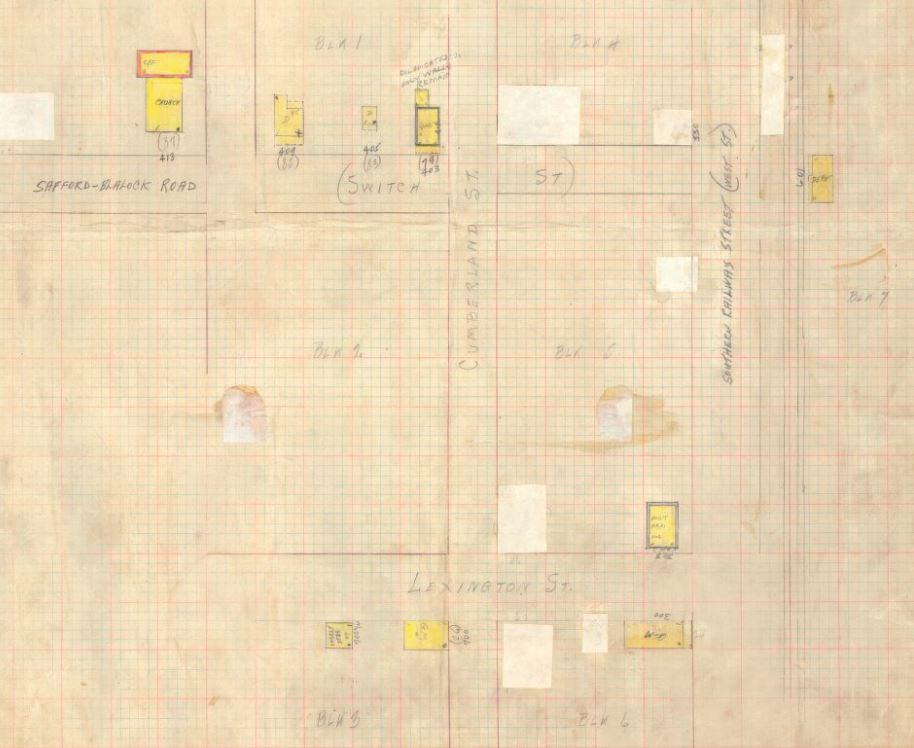
- 1919 fire insurance map of Safford

- Location in Alabama Safford (the United States)
- Coordinates: 32°17′17″N 87°22′17″W
- Country: United States
- State: Alabama
- County: Dallas
- Elevation: 230 ft (70 m)
- Time zone: UTC-6 (Central (CST))
  - Summer (DST): UTC-5 (CDT)
- ZIP code: 36773
- Area code: 334
- GNIS feature ID: 155224

Safford is an unincorporated community in Dallas County, Alabama.

Benjamin F. Gibson (1931–2021), United States District Court judge, was born in Safford.

Safford is located at the intersection of State Route 5 and State Route 22 and is the western terminus of SR 22 which extends eastward to the Georgia state line.
