= Clarence W. Sessions =

American judge

Clarence William Sessions
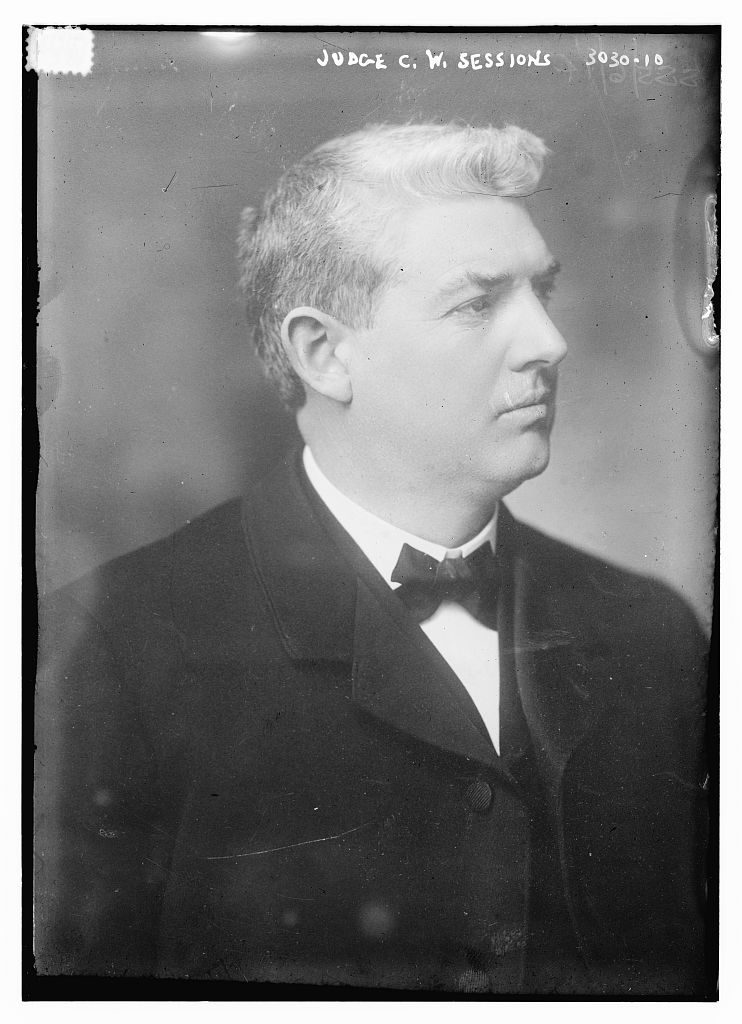
- Sessions in 1915

Judge of the United States District Court for the Western District of Michigan
- In office March 2, 1911 – April 1, 1931
- Appointed by: William Howard Taft
- Preceded by: Arthur Carter Denison
- Succeeded by: Seat abolished

Personal details
- Born: Clarence William Sessions; February 8, 1859 North Plains Township, Michigan, U.S.
- Died: April 1, 1931 (aged 72) Grand Rapids, Michigan, U.S.
- Education: University of Michigan (AB)

Clarence William Sessions (February 8, 1859 – April 1, 1931) was a United States district judge of the United States District Court for the Western District of Michigan.

== Education and career ==
Born in North Plains Township, Ionia County, Michigan, Sessions received an Artium Baccalaureus degree from the University of Michigan in 1881 and read law to enter the bar in 1883. He was in private practice in Ionia, Michigan from 1883 to 1885, and in Muskegon, Michigan from 1885 to 1906. He was a Judge of the Circuit Court of Michigan from 1906 to 1911.

== Federal judicial service ==
On February 25, 1911, Sessions was nominated by President William Howard Taft to a seat on the United States District Court for the Western District of Michigan that was vacated by Judge Arthur Carter Denison. Sessions was confirmed by the United States Senate on March 2, 1911, and received his commission the same day. He served until his death on April 1, 1931, in Grand Rapids, Michigan.

=== Disability ===
As a result of the performance of his judicial duties, Sessions' health broke down, circa 1924. This left him unable to handle the full extent of his duties. Sessions was the only Judge assigned to the Western District of Michigan at that time. Consequently, Congress enacted Pub. L. 68–423, 43 Stat. 949, effective February 17, 1925, which established a second judgeship for the district and directed that the Judge appointed to that judgeship would be treated as if senior in commission to Sessions. This relieved Sessions of administrative responsibilities for the court. The statute also provided that upon Session's death, resignation or retirement, the resulting vacancy would not be filled. Fred Morton Raymond was appointed to the new judgeship by President Calvin Coolidge on May 8, 1925. After Raymond's appointment, Sessions shortly ceased the performance of any judicial duties shortly thereafter but remained a judge until his death.

== Sources ==
Legal offices
Preceded by Arthur Carter Denison	Judge of the United States District Court for the Western District of Michigan; 1911–1931	Succeeded by Seat abolished
