= Fred Morton Raymond =

American judge

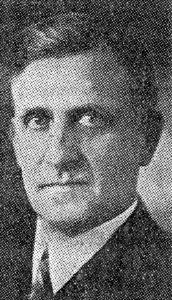

Judge of the United States District Court for the Western District of Michigan
- In office May 8, 1925 – February 6, 1946
- Appointed by: Calvin Coolidge
- Preceded by: Seat established by 43 Stat. 949
- Succeeded by: Raymond Wesley Starr

Personal details
- Born: Fred Morton Raymond; March 22, 1876 Berlin, Michigan
- Died: February 6, 1946 (aged 69)
- Education: University of Michigan Law School (LL.B.)

Fred Morton Raymond (March 22, 1876 – February 6, 1946) was a United States district judge of the United States District Court for the Western District of Michigan.

== Education and career ==
Born in Berlin (now Marne), Michigan, Raymond received a Bachelor of Laws from the University of Michigan Law School in 1899. He was in private practice in Grand Rapids, Michigan from 1899 to 1925.

== Federal judicial service ==
Raymond received a recess appointment from President Calvin Coolidge on May 8, 1925, to the United States District Court for the Western District of Michigan, to a new seat authorized by 43 Stat. 949. He was nominated to the same position by President Coolidge on December 8, 1925. He was confirmed by the United States Senate on December 18, 1925, and received his commission the same day. His service terminated on February 6, 1946, due to his death.

== Sources ==
Legal offices
Preceded by Seat established by 43 Stat. 949	Judge of the United States District Court for the Western District of Michigan; 1925–1946	Succeeded by Raymond Wesley Starr
