= United States District Court for the Western District of Michigan =

United States federal district court in Michigan

Coordinates: 42°58′12.0″N 85°40′15.2″W

- (W.D. Mich.)
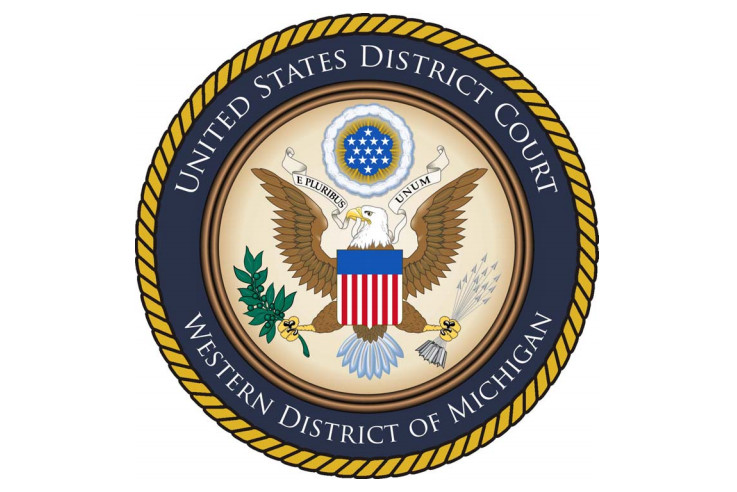

- Location: Grand Rapids More locations: Kalamazoo; Lansing; Marquette; Traverse City; Sault Ste. Marie
- Appeals to: Sixth Circuit
- Established: February 24, 1863
- Judges: 4
- Chief Judge: Hala Y. Jarbou

Officers of the court
- U.S. Attorney: Timothy VerHey
- U.S. Marshal: Bruce Nordin (acting)
- www.miwd.uscourts.gov

The United States District Court for the Western District of Michigan (in case citations, W.D. Mich.) is the federal district court with jurisdiction over the western portion of the state of Michigan, including the entire Upper Peninsula and the Lower Peninsula from Lansing westward.

Appeals from the Western District of Michigan are taken to the United States Court of Appeals for the Sixth Circuit (except for patent claims and claims against the U.S. government under the Tucker Act, which are appealed to the Federal Circuit).

As of July 21, 2025, the United States attorney for the Western District of Michigan is Timothy VerHey.

== History ==
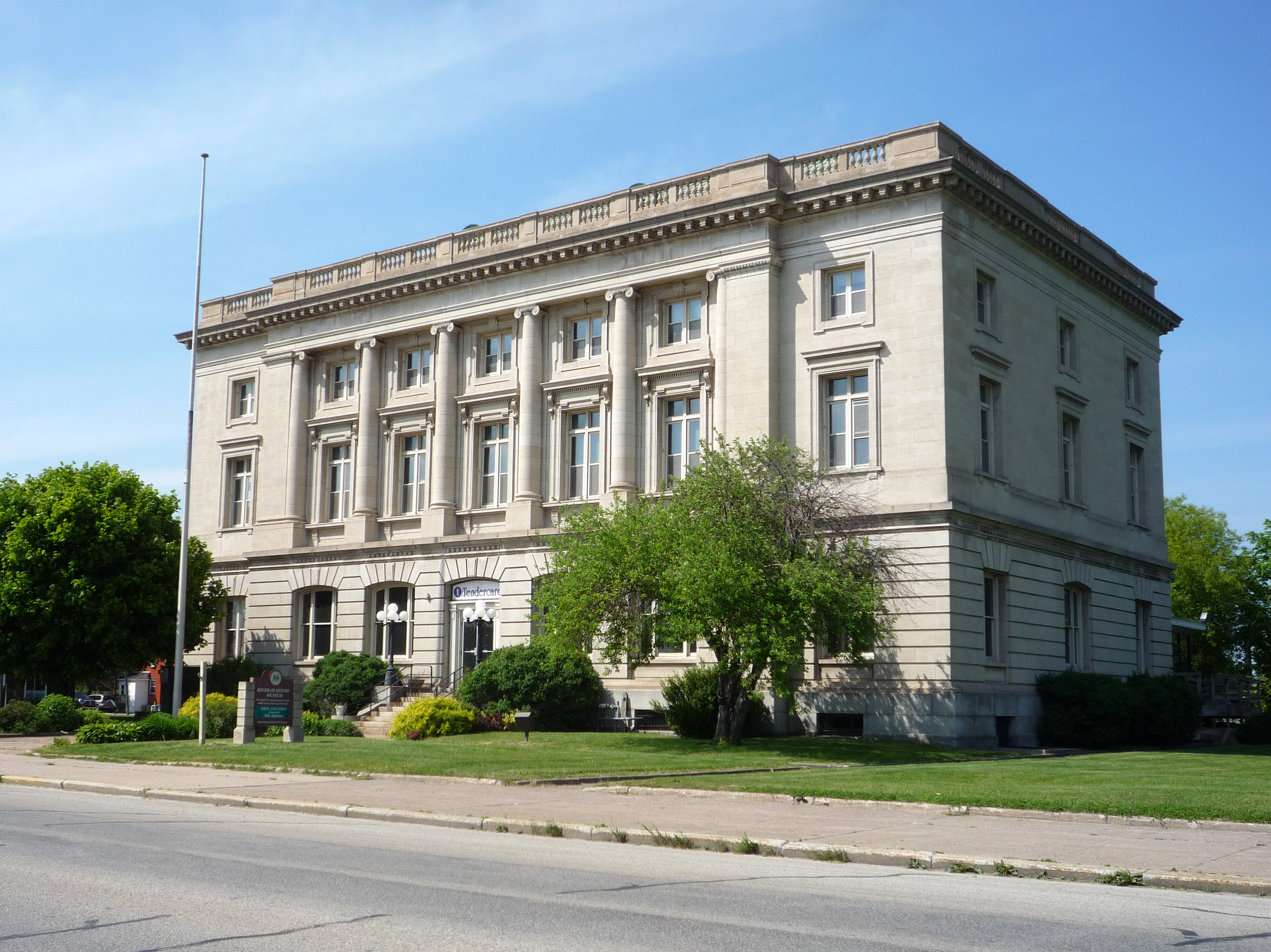
Old Federal Building in Sault Ste. Marie served as a courthouse of the Western District of Michigan; the court met there from 1912 until 1941.

The United States District Court for the District of Michigan was established on July 1, 1836, by 5 Stat. 61, with a single judgeship. The district court was not assigned to a judicial circuit, but was granted the same jurisdiction as United States circuit courts, except in appeals and writs of error, which were the jurisdiction of the Supreme Court. Due to the Toledo War, a boundary dispute with Ohio, Michigan did not become a state of the union until January 26, 1837. On March 3, 1837, Congress passed an act that repealed the circuit court jurisdiction of the U.S. District Court for the District of Michigan, assigned the District of Michigan to the Seventh Circuit, and established a U.S. circuit court for the district, 5 Stat. 176.

On July 15, 1862, Congress reorganized the circuits and assigned Michigan to the Eighth Circuit by 12 Stat. 576, and on January 28, 1863, the Congress again reorganized Seventh and Eight Circuits and assigned Michigan to the Seventh Circuit, by 12 Stat. 637. On February 24, 1863, Congress divided the District of Michigan into the Eastern and the Western districts, with one judgeship authorized for each district, by 12 Stat. 660. The Western District was later further divided into a Southern Division and a Northern Division.

In the Northern Division, Court was held at the Old Federal Building in Sault Ste. Marie from 1912 until 1941. While the law allows court to be held in Sault Ste. Marie, it no longer is.

== Jurisdiction ==
The District Court is based in Grand Rapids, courthouses also located in Kalamazoo, Lansing, and Marquette in the Upper Peninsula. The United States Court of Appeals for the Sixth Circuit has appellate jurisdiction over the court.

== Divisions ==
The Western District comprises two divisions.

=== Northern Division ===
The Northern Division comprises the counties of Alger, Baraga, Chippewa, Delta, Dickinson, Gogebic, Houghton, Iron, Keweenaw, Luce, Mackinac, Marquette, Menominee, Ontonagon, and Schoolcraft.

Court for the Northern Division can be held in Marquette and Sault Sainte Marie.

=== Southern Division ===
The Southern Division comprises the counties of Allegan, Antrim, Barry, Benzie, Berrien, Branch, Calhoun, Cass, Charlevoix, Clinton, Eaton, Emmet, Grand Traverse, Hillsdale, Ingham, Ionia, Kalamazoo, Kalkaska, Kent, Lake, Leelanau, Manistee, Mason, Mecosta, Missaukee, Montcalm, Muskegon, Newaygo, Oceana, Osceola, Ottawa, Saint Joseph, Van Buren, and Wexford.

Court for the Southern Division can be held in Grand Rapids, Kalamazoo, Lansing, and Traverse City.

== Notable cases ==
Some of the notable cases that have come before the United States District Court for the Western District of Michigan include:

- Bogaert v. Land
- Brown v. Davenport
- Carroll v. United States
- Lehnert v. Ferris Faculty Ass'n
- Newberry v. United States
- Upjohn Co. v. United States
- United States v. Bestfoods
- United States v. Craft
- United States v. Ogoshi

== Current judges ==
As of October 1, 2024:

#	Title	Judge	Duty station	Born	Term of service			Appointed by
#	Title	Judge	Duty station	Born	Active	Chief	Senior	Appointed by
22	Chief Judge	Hala Y. Jarbou	Lansing	1971	2020–present	2022–present	—	Trump
19	District Judge	Paul Lewis Maloney	Kalamazoo	1949	2007–present	2008–2015	—	G.W. Bush
20	District Judge	Robert James Jonker	Grand Rapids	1960	2007–present	2015–2022	—	G.W. Bush
23	District Judge	Jane M. Beckering	Grand Rapids	1965	2021–present	—	—	Biden
18	Senior Judge	Gordon Jay Quist	inactive	1937	1992–2006	—	2006–present	G.H.W. Bush
21	Senior Judge	Janet T. Neff	inactive	1945	2007–2021	—	2021–present	G.W. Bush

== Former judges ==
#	Judge	Born–died	Active service	Chief Judge	Senior status	Appointed by	Reason for termination
1	Solomon Lewis Withey	1820–1886	1863–1886	—	—	Lincoln	death
2	Henry Franklin Severens	1835–1923	1886–1900	—	—	Cleveland	elevation
3	George P. Wanty	1856–1906	1900–1906	—	—	McKinley	death
4	Loyal Edwin Knappen	1854–1930	1906–1910	—	—	T. Roosevelt	elevation
5	Arthur Carter Denison	1861–1942	1910–1911	—	—	Taft	elevation
6	Clarence W. Sessions	1859–1931	1911–1931	—	—	Taft	death
7	Fred Morton Raymond	1876–1946	1925–1946 (Note: Recess appointment; formally nominated on December 8, 1925, confirmed by the United States Senate on December 18, 1925, and received commission the same day.)	—	—	Coolidge	death
8	Raymond Wesley Starr	1888–1968	1946–1961	1954–1961	1961–1968	Truman	death
9	W. Wallace Kent	1916–1973	1954–1971	1961–1971	—	Eisenhower	elevation
10	Noel Peter Fox	1910–1987	1962–1979	1971–1979	1979–1987	Kennedy	death
11	Albert J. Engel Jr.	1924–2013	1970–1974	—	—	Nixon	elevation
12	Wendell Alverson Miles	1916–2013	1974–1986	1979–1986	1986–2013	Nixon	death
13	Douglas Woodruff Hillman	1922–2007	1979–1991	1986–1991	1991–2002	Carter	retirement
14	Benjamin F. Gibson	1931–2021	1979–1996	1991–1995	1996–1999	Carter	retirement
15	Richard Alan Enslen	1931–2015	1979–2005	1995–2001	2005–2015	Carter	death
16	Robert Holmes Bell	1944–2023	1987–2017	2001–2008	2017–2023	Reagan	death
17	David McKeague	1946–present	1992–2005	—	—	G.H.W. Bush	elevation

== Chief judges ==
Chief judges have administrative responsibilities with respect to their district court. Unlike the Supreme Court, where one justice is specifically nominated to be chief, the office of chief judge rotates among the district court judges. To be chief, a judge must have been in active service on the court for at least one year, be under the age of 65, and have not previously served as chief judge.

A vacancy is filled by the judge highest in seniority among the group of qualified judges. The chief judge serves for a term of seven years, or until age 70, whichever occurs first. The age restrictions are waived if no members of the court would otherwise be qualified for the position.

When the office was created in 1948, the chief judge was the longest-serving judge who had not elected to retire, on what has since 1958 been known as senior status, or declined to serve as chief judge. After August 6, 1959, judges could not become or remain chief after turning 70 years old. The current rules have been in operation since October 1, 1982.

== Succession of seats ==
Seat 1
Seat established on February 24, 1863 by 12 Stat. 660
Withey	1863–1886
Severens	1886–1900
Wanty	1900–1906
Knappen	1906–1910
Denison	1910–1911
Sessions	1911–1931
Seat abolished on April 1, 1931 pursuant to 43 Stat. 949

Seat 2
Seat established on February 17, 1925 by 43 Stat. 949
Raymond	1925–1946
Starr	1946–1961
Fox	1962–1979
Enslen	1979–2005
Maloney	2007–present

Seat 3
Seat established on February 10, 1954 by 68 Stat. 8
Kent	1954–1971
Engel, Jr.	1970–1974
Miles	1974–1986
Bell	1987–2017
Jarbou	2020–present

Seat 4
Seat established on October 20, 1978 by 92 Stat. 1629
Hillman	1979–1991
McKeague	1992–2005
Neff	2007–2021
Beckering	2021–present

Seat 5
Seat established on October 20, 1978 by 92 Stat. 1629
Gibson	1979–1996
Seat abolished on July 13, 1996 (temporary judgeship expired)

Seat 6
Seat established on December 1, 1990 by 104 Stat. 5089 (temporary)
Seat became permanent upon the abolition of Seat 5 on July 13, 1996
Quist	1992–2006
Jonker	2007–present

== See also ==
- Courts of Michigan
- List of current United States district judges
- List of United States federal courthouses in Michigan
