= W. Wallace Kent =

American judge (1916–1973)

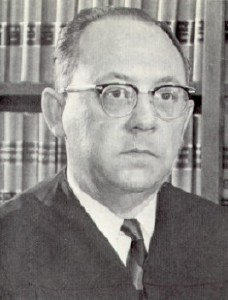

Judge of the United States Court of Appeals for the Sixth Circuit
- In office December 18, 1970 – May 28, 1973
- Appointed by: Richard Nixon
- Preceded by: Bert Combs
- Succeeded by: Albert J. Engel Jr.

Chief Judge of the United States District Court for the Western District of Michigan
- In office 1961–1971
- Preceded by: Raymond Wesley Starr
- Succeeded by: Noel Peter Fox

Judge of the United States District Court for the Western District of Michigan
- In office June 10, 1954 – January 6, 1971
- Appointed by: Dwight D. Eisenhower
- Preceded by: Seat established by 68 Stat. 8
- Succeeded by: Albert J. Engel Jr.

Personal details
- Born: W. Wallace Kent; May 1, 1916 Galesburg, Michigan
- Died: May 28, 1973 (aged 57)
- Education: Western Michigan College (BA); University of Michigan Law School (JD)

W. Wallace Kent (May 1, 1916 – May 28, 1973) was a United States circuit judge of the United States Court of Appeals for the Sixth Circuit and a United States district judge of the United States District Court for the Western District of Michigan.

== Education and career ==
Born on May 1, 1916, in Galesburg, Michigan, Kent received a Bachelor of Arts degree from Western Michigan College in 1937. He received a Juris Doctor from the University of Michigan Law School in 1940. He was an assistant prosecuting attorney and friend of the court in Kalamazoo County, Michigan, from 1941 to 1944. He was the prosecuting attorney of Kalamazoo County, from 1945 to 1946. He was in private practice of law in Kalamazoo County, from 1944 to 1954.

== Federal judicial service ==
Kent was nominated by President Dwight D. Eisenhower on May 10, 1954, to the United States District Court for the Western District of Michigan, to a new seat created by 68 Stat. 8. He was confirmed by the United States Senate on June 8, 1954, and received his commission on June 10, 1954. He served as Chief Judge, from 1961 to 1971. His service was terminated on January 6, 1971, due to elevation to the Sixth Circuit.

Kent was nominated by President Richard Nixon on December 8, 1970, to a seat on the United States Court of Appeals for the Sixth Circuit vacated by Judge Bert Combs. He was confirmed by the Senate on December 16, 1970, and received his commission on December 18, 1970. His service was terminated on May 28, 1973, due to death by an apparent heart attack.

== Significant cases ==
- Bradley v. Milliken, 484 F.2d 215 (6th Cir. 1973), rev'd sub nom Milliken v. Bradley, 418 U.S. 717 (1974), was a school busing case. Judge Kent wrote a partial dissent, the reasoning of which was adopted by the Supreme Court in overruling the Sixth Circuit holding.

== Sources ==
- FJC Bio

Legal offices
Preceded by Seat established by 68 Stat. 8	Judge of the United States District Court for the Western District of Michigan; 1954–1971	Succeeded by Albert J. Engel Jr.
Preceded by Raymond Wesley Starr	Chief Judge of the United States District Court for the Western District of Michigan; 1961–1971	Succeeded by Noel Peter Fox
Preceded by Bert Combs	Judge of the United States Court of Appeals for the Sixth Circuit; 1971–1973	Succeeded by Albert J. Engel Jr.
