= Colleen O'Brien =

American judge

Colleen A. O'Brien is a judge on the Michigan Court of Appeals. She was appointed to the Court in October 2015 by Governor Rick Snyder.

Prior to her appointment to the Court of Appeals, O'Brien served as a judge of the 6th Circuit Court in Oakland County, beginning in 1998. She has been active in the Michigan Judges Association and has participated in judicial education and community programs.

O'Brien earned her bachelor's degree from the University of Michigan and her law degree from the Detroit College of Law (now the Michigan State University College of Law).

In 2012, O'Brien ran with the Republican endorsement for the Michigan Supreme Court but was not elected. After Diane Hathaway resigned from the Michigan Supreme Court amid fraud charges O'Brien was seen as a strong candidate to replace her, but the appointment eventually went to David Viviano of Macomb County.
