= Michigan Court of Claims =

The Courts of Claims is a statewide court with limited jurisdiction. The court of claims has jurisdiction to hear cases filed where the State of Michigan is a Defendant. The Court of Claims by statue operates like the Michigan Circuit Courts.

== History ==
The Michigan Court of Claims held its first hearing on January 17, 1940. Circuit Court Judge George W. Sample drafted the rules for the new court. The Court of claims replaced the prior claims committee of the administrative board. The prior system which the court of claims replaced was not only unsatisfactory from a procedure point of view but put state officials in the position of defendant, judge, and jury in each case. There was no opportunity to appeal the administrative boards ruling. Under the newly established court of claims, now let the claimant appeal to the Michigan Supreme Court.

The Court of claims sessions were held in the Senate Chamber committee room. The ordinal court under Judges Sample rules would provided for six terms a year, each three weeks long. The Court would only meet the First Wednesday of June and November and the third Wednesday of January, March, April and September. A claim filed to be heard on one of the published days would have to be filed 14 days prior to the start of the term.

Judge Samples rules also had all cost of litigation placed on the state and parties filing cases could not be assessed cost. The first clerk of the Court of Claims was William T. Caughey. The first session of the court had 13 cases on the docket. The largest claim before the new court was $100,000 filed by Briggs Commercial & Development Co. The claim alleged that damages came from the widening of Woodward Avenue at Birmingham.

=== Alexander Ripan ===
In the April 1940 term of the court, a claim was filed by Alexander Ripan from Saginaw, Michigan filed a claim for $10,000 in damages. He was convicted in 1919 on circumstantial evidence and was sentenced to life in prison. He was incarcerated until he escaped in 1929. He was a wanted fugitive 1935 when he was returned to prison. He was accused and convicted of the murder of Luca Tirpula on March 25, 1920. There was ballistic evidence uses in the conviction, however new testing declared that Ripan's gun could not have filed the shot. the prosecutor who tried the case filed for his release under a nolle prosse of the case. The former prosecutor is now representing Ripan in the claim against the state.

A bill in the 1939 Legislature was introduced to compensate him for the 13 years but it did not pass. After a hearing in the court of claims, Mr. Ripan was denied an award. Ingham County, Michigan Circuit Judge Leland W. Carr who presided over the hearing found no merit to Ripan's claim that he was entitled to $10,000 for work he performed while he was sentenced to life at hard labor. It was noted by many at the time that "the American policy of refusing compensation to men who are wrongly imprisoned for long periods is one of the greatest defects in the administrations of justice."

== Organization ==
The Court of Claims was part of the 30th Michigan Circuit Courts however in 2013 the legislature passed legislation that moved the Court of Claims to the Michigan Court of Appeals.

=== External links ===
- Michigan Courts at Mi.Gov
