= Michigan Court of Appeals =

Intermediate appellate court of Michigan

- Established: 1 January 1965
- Jurisdiction: Michigan
- Location: Detroit (1st & 2nd Districts); Grand Rapids (3rd District); Lansing (4th District)
- Composition method: election; appointment
- Authorised by: MI Const. art. VI, § 1
- Appeals to: Michigan Supreme Court
- Judge term length: 6 years
- Number of positions: 25
- Website: Michigan Court Appeals

Chief Judge
- Currently: Michael F. Gadola

Division map
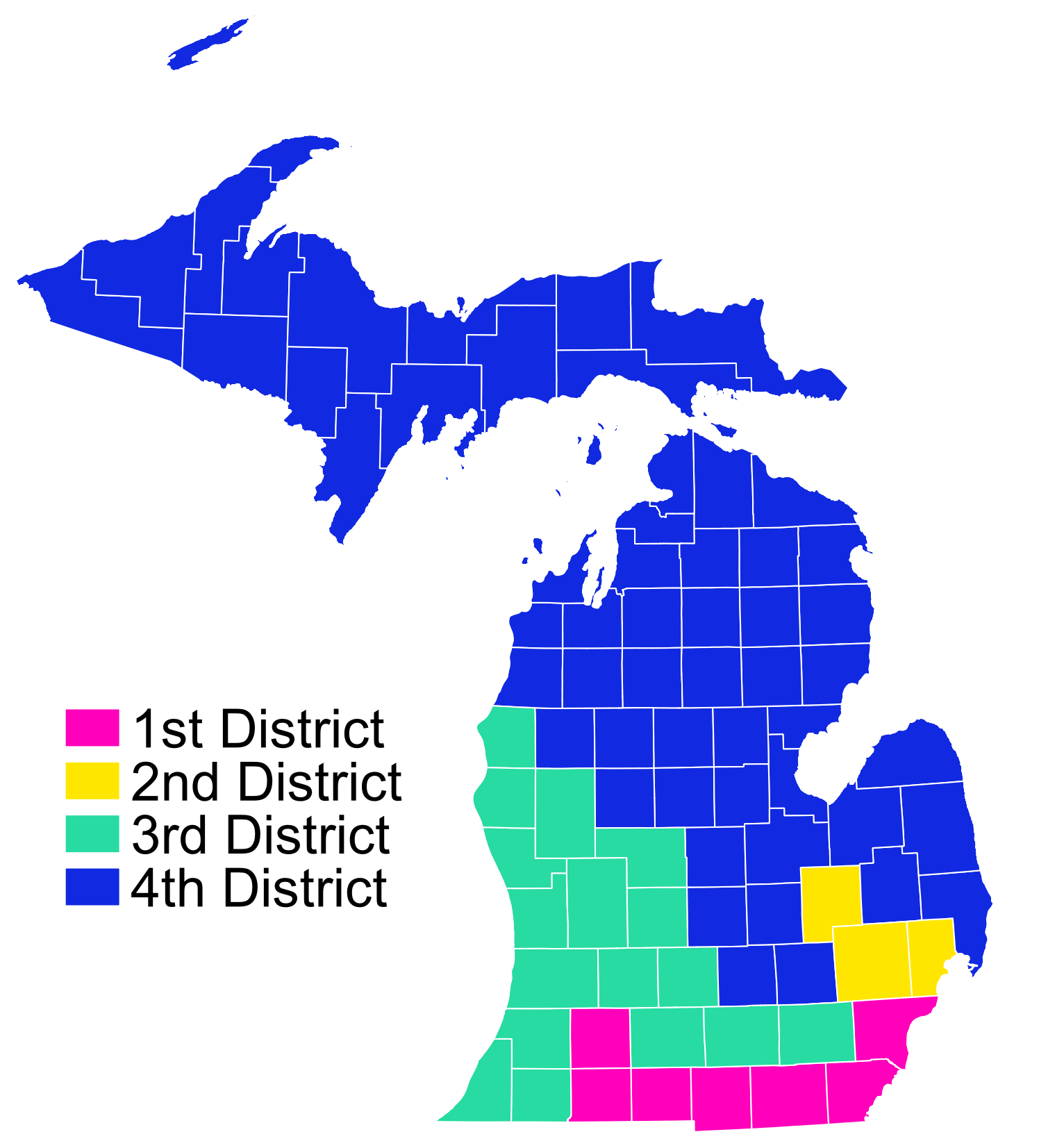

The Michigan Court of Appeals is the intermediate-level appellate court of the state of Michigan. It was created by the Michigan Constitution of 1963, and commenced operations in 1965. Its opinions are reported both in an official publication of the State of Michigan, Michigan Appeals Reports, as well as the unofficial, privately published North Western Reporter, published by West. Appeals from this court's decisions go to the Michigan Supreme Court.

== History ==
districts used from 1965 to 1972

districts used from 1972 to 1987

districts used from 1987 to 1993

districts used from 1993 to 2002

districts used from 2002 to 2013

districts used since 2013

The court originally had only nine judges. The number was steadily increased by the Michigan Legislature to accommodate the court's growing caseload—to 12 in 1969, to 18 in 1974, to 24 in 1988, and to 28 in 1993. In 2012, Michigan Governor Rick Snyder signed into law legislation which provided for the transition of each of the court's 4 election districts to 6 judges, which will bring the court back to 24 judges over time through attrition.

The court originally had three electoral districts, established in 1965 (by 1964 Act 281). The districts were redrawn in 1972 (Act 157) and 1987 (1986 Act 279). In 1993 (Act 190), a fourth district was added. The next redraw occurred in 2002 (2001 Act 117). Finally, 2012 Act 624 established the current lines (effective in 2013).

== Overview ==
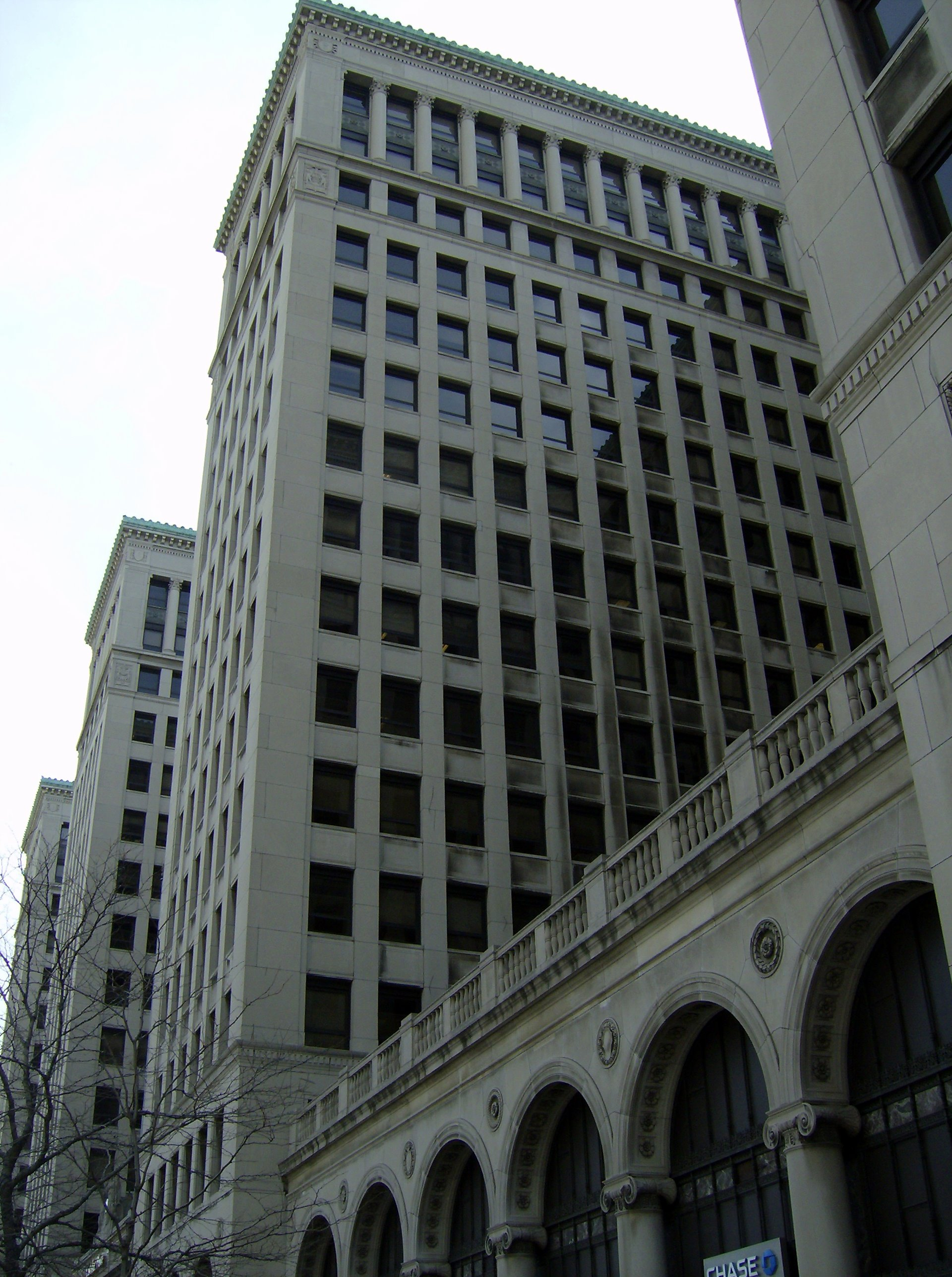
Districts 1 and 2 of the Michigan Court of Appeals are located in Cadillac Place, a State office complex in Detroit.

The court has 25 judges who are elected from four electoral districts for 6-year terms on a non-partisan ballot. Vacancies are filled by the governor. Judges or candidates who reach the age of 70 are not allowed to run for election. Although the judges are elected in districts, they sit as one statewide court.

Cases are heard by panels of 3 judges, similarly to the U.S. Courts of Appeals. Like most appellate courts, the Court of Appeals observes the principle of stare decisis, where a court's reasoning in its past precedents binds its present decisions. When a panel of the court disagrees with a prior precedent, it must abide by the earlier decision in deciding the case at hand. When a panel expresses its disagreement with a prior precedent, there is a mechanism to convene a special 7-member "conflict panel" (similar to the en banc procedure in the U.S. Courts of Appeals) that resolves the conflict between the earlier decision and the expressed desire of a panel of the court's judges to depart from that precedent. Unlike the circuits of the federal courts, the Michigan Court of Appeal's precedents apply are applied statewide regardless of the district in which an opinion is handed down.

== Districts ==
The court has four electoral districts:

- 1st District, based in Detroit
- 2nd District, based in Detroit (Note: Detroit is not within the 2nd District; the 2nd District's previous office in Troy closed in August 2026 and was consolidated with the 1st District office in Detroit. The Troy office did not include a courtroom.)
- 3rd District, based in Grand Rapids
- 4th District, based in Lansing

Due to the geographic size of the 4th District, the court will, on occasion, schedule a panel to hear cases in a northern Michigan city (such as Marquette, Petoskey, or Traverse City), for the convenience of the parties.

Each district elects six or seven judges, but the judges on the various panels are not drawn from specific districts. There are also four case filing districts based around geographic proximity to the court's physical records; because of this, the lines of the electoral districts and case filing districts do not correspond.

== Current judges ==
District	Name	Born	Start	Term Ends	Appointer	Law School
4th	Michael Gadola, Chief Judge	July 2, 1961 (age 65)	December 5, 2014	2028	Rick Snyder (R)	Wayne
1st	Christopher Murray	February 14, 1964 (age 62)	2002	2032	John Engler (R)	Detroit Mercy
4th	Stephen Borrello	June 9, 1959 (age 67)	2003	2030	Jennifer Granholm (D)	Michigan State
4th	Michael Kelly	April 3, 1962 (age 64)	January 1, 2009	2032	—N/a (Note: Took office after being elected in a nonpartisan election.)	Michigan State
3rd	Mark Boonstra	May 20, 1957 (age 69)	March 20, 2012	2032	Rick Snyder (R)	Michigan
1st	Michael Riordan	April 18, 1960 (age 66)	March 21, 2012	2030	Rick Snyder (R)	Detroit Mercy
2nd	Colleen O'Brien	May 19, 1956 (age 70)	October 26, 2015	2028	Rick Snyder (R)	Michigan State
4th	Brock Swartzle	February 28, 1971 (age 55)	January 1, 2017	2028	Rick Snyder (R)	George Mason
1st	Thomas Cameron	1969 (age 56–57)	July 17, 2017	2028	Rick Snyder (R)	Wayne
1st	Anica Letica	1960 (age 65–66)	June 18, 2018	2032	Rick Snyder (R)	Wayne
3rd	James Robert Redford	October 8, 1960 (age 66)	December 21, 2018	2028	Rick Snyder (R)	Detroit Mercy
4th	Michelle Rick	January 4, 1965 (age 61)	January 1, 2021	2032	—N/a	Detroit Mercy
2nd	Sima Patel	1978 (age 47–48)	February 28, 2022	2032	Gretchen Whitmer (D)	Cooley
1st	Kristina Robinson Garrett	1985 (age 40–41)	April 4, 2022	2028	Gretchen Whitmer (D)	Detroit Mercy
3rd	Kathleen Feeney	June 21, 1962 (age 64)	January 1, 2023	2028	—N/a	UIUC
4th	Allie Greenleaf Maldonado	1970 (age 55–56)	January 9, 2023	2032	Gretchen Whitmer (D)	Michigan
2nd	Adrienne Young	1987 (age 38–39)	February 20, 2024	2030	Gretchen Whitmer (D)	Chicago
3rd	Philip Mariani	1979 (age 46–47)	March 15, 2024	2030	Gretchen Whitmer (D)	Penn
2nd	Randy Wallace	February 16, 1973 (age 53)	August 12, 2024	2030	Gretchen Whitmer (D)	Wayne
2nd	Matthew Ackerman	1991 (age 34–35)	January 1, 2025	2030	—N/a	Columbia
3rd	Daniel Korobkin	1979 (age 46–47)	May 12, 2025	2032	Gretchen Whitmer (D)	Yale
1st	Mariam Bazzi	1979 (age 46–47)	May 13, 2025	2032	Gretchen Whitmer (D)	Wayne
2nd	Christopher Trebilcock	July 12, 1974 (age 52)	May 19, 2025	2032	Gretchen Whitmer (D)	Wake Forest
1st	Andrew Lievense	1977 (age 48–49)	April 13, 2026	2032	Gretchen Whitmer (D)	Michigan
3rd	Vacant					
