= Davis Mountain Resort hostage crisis =

Hostage crisis in Texas in 1997

- Part of Texas secession movements
- Jeff Davis county, where the standoff occurred
- Date: April 27, 1997 – May 4, 1997 (UTC-5)
- Location: Davis Mountain Resort, Jeff Davis County, Texas, United States
- Goals: Texas independence and recognition of Independence; Release of Jo Ann Turner; Property rights for property in the Davis Mountains Resort as their headquarters

Parties
Republic of Texas (McLaren Faction)	United States federal government; ATF; FBI; FBI Hostage Rescue Team; Texas Rangers

Lead figures
Richard McLaren	George W. Bush

Number
c.5–30 members (unclear)	Dozens of law enforcement officers

Casualties and losses
1 person killed (Mike Matson)	None

Casualties
- Arrested: Multiple, including Richard McLaren
- Charged: Kidnapping, aggravated assault, and other charges

The Davis Mountain Resort hostage crisis was a hostage crisis and standoff between the McLaren Faction of the Republic of Texas group and the US federal government from April 27, 1997, to May 4, 1997, when members of the Republic of Texas-McLaren Faction kidnapped Joe and Margaret Ann Rowe and held them hostage at the Davis Mountain Resort and demanded the release of a member of the group, Jo Ann Turner in exchange for the Rowes, eventually saying his nation was "at war with the United States government." One of the members ended up being shot and killed in a firefight with authorities and Joe Rowe was shot in the shoulder during the kidnapping.

== Timeline ==
On April 27, 1997, members of the McLaren Faction abducted Joe and Margaret Ann Rowe from their home at the Davis Mountain Resort, a remote community in the Davis Mountains. The faction demanded the release of Jo Ann Turner, who was jailed on charges related to the group's activities, as a condition for freeing the Rowes. Richard McLaren declared that his "nation" was at war with the United States government.

For several days, negotiations continued with little progress. The McLaren Faction remained defiant, fortified within the resort, and heavily armed. On May 3, the situation escalated when a firefight broke out between the group and law enforcement. The militants, with the troopers in hot pursuit, fired at a Black Hawk helicopter and searching dogs in the Davis Mountains. One of the Republic of Texas members, Mike Matson, was shot and killed during the exchange.

=== Resolution ===
The standoff concluded on May 4, 1997, when the remaining members of the McLaren Faction, facing overwhelming force and dwindling supplies, agreed to surrender. The hostages, Joe and Margaret Ann Rowe, were released unharmed. Richard McLaren and other faction members were taken into custody and subsequently faced numerous charges, including kidnapping and aggravated assault.

== Aftermath ==
The crisis effectively destroyed the McLaren faction of the Republic of Texas and the Johnson-Enloe faction was discredited after two of its members, Jack Abbot Grebe Jr. and Johnnie Wise, were convicted in 1998 of threatening to assassinate several government officials, including President Bill Clinton. The two men were each sentenced to 24 years in prison. The faction led by Archie Lowe and Daniel Miller would later become the Texas Nationalist Movement.

== See also ==
- Waco siege
- Standoff at Eagle Pass
