= Reactions to the International Court of Justice advisory opinion on Kosovo's declaration of independence =

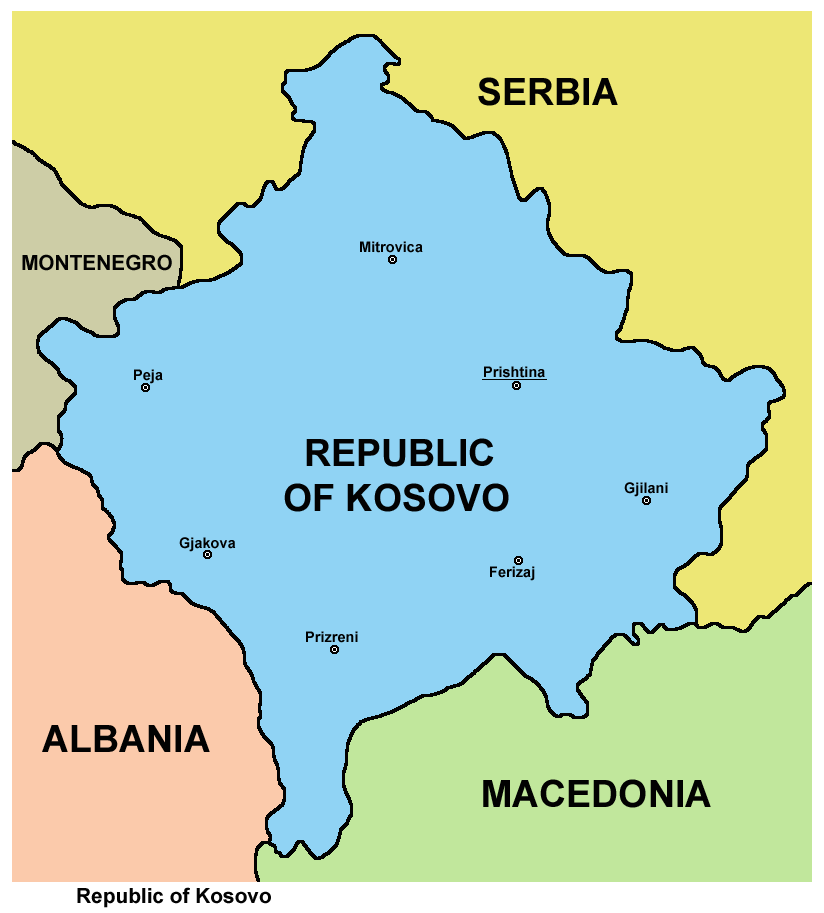
Map of the Republic of Kosovo

There have been strong reactions to the International Court of Justice advisory opinion on Kosovo's declaration of independence, rendered on 22 July 2010. The ruling, which held that the Kosovo declaration of independence was not in violation of international law, drew praise from some quarters and negative reactions from other quarters led by Serbia and other states which said their position would not change.

== Involved parties ==
Involved parties	Response
Kosovo	After the ICJ Verdict, President Fatmir Sejdiu said the decision was positive and that it "explicitly on all counts spoke in favour of the right to freedom and self-determination of the people of Kosovo". He called on the countries that had not recognised Kosovo, as well as Serbia, to "join the common vision of the countries in the region in their position regarding the bright future and speedy Euro-Atlantic integrations". Prime Minister Hashim Thaci, who was in the US during the announcement, said the opinion would "sober" Serbia. "The best choice for Serbia is to recognize Kosovo as soon as possible, so they can cooperate and help each to integrate with the European Union." Deputy prime minister Hajredin Kuqi said "There is no dilemma anymore, even for the people of Serbia and the government of Serbia. We need to support each other for EU integration. [The government of Serbia has peddled] myths [about Kosovo and should now] move forward." Foreign Minister Skënder Hyseni released a statement: "We welcome the Opinion given today by the International Court of Justice. The Court found, by a large majority, that the Declaration of Independence of Kosovo did not violate international law. The Opinion is explicit and clear and leaves no room for doubt. The International Court has found in Kosovo's favour on all points. We now look forward to further recognitions of Kosovo. We call upon States that have delayed recognising the Republic of Kosovo pending the Opinion to move forward towards recognition. Nothing in the Opinion given by the Court casts any doubt on the statehood of the Republic of Kosovo, which is an established fact. It is clear that Kosovo's independence has not set any precedent. Kosovo is and has always been a special case. Kosovo's independence is in the interests of the whole of the Western Balkans. The future of both Kosovo and Serbia lies within the European Union and NATO. For that there must be good neighbourly relations. That is what we seek. It is now for Serbia to live up to its responsibilities. I wish to reaffirm Kosovo's willingness to discuss with Serbia practical matters of mutual interest. Any discussions with Serbia must be on an equal footing and on a State-to-State basis." He also added that "I expect Serbia to turn and come to us, to talk with us on so many issues of mutual interest, of mutual importance. But such talks can only take place as talks between sovereign states." Shkendije Géci Sherifi, Kosovo's ambassador to Hungary, said the ruling paves the way for more recognition and ultimately UN and EU accession, and it "proved that Kosovo did not breach international law and had the legitimate right to become a state. The ICJ decision will open a new path for Kosovo. Many states who were reluctant to recognise Kosovo because they were thinking that our independence is in contradiction with international law can now rethink their position.": A protest rally was called by Serbs of Kosovo in Mitrovica. They were also allegedly preparing an armed response in case jubilant Albanians tried to cross the Ibar river which divides the city. Following the opinion helicopters from the NATO-led peacekeeping force circled above the city. In the Serbian Orthodox monastery of Visoki Decani, Father Sava said he feared for the church's security. "We are in serious danger because we are seen as a symbol of Serbia, even though we are not acting politically."
Serbia	President of Serbia, Boris Tadić stated that "The decision of the International Court of Justice that a unilateral declaration of Kosovo's independence does not violate the international law is difficult for Serbia. However, it is clear that the Court has not ruled on the right of secession, but chose to discuss only the technical content of the Declaration of Independence. The text of the declaration itself does not violate international law, as it does not mention it. Consequently, the Court has avoided substantive comment on the issue and left it and all the political implications of the matter to the highest authority of the United Nations – the General Assembly. The political conclusion is now left for the UN General Assembly. Of course Serbia will never recognise the unilateral declaration of independence because we believe that unilateral secession that is ethnically motivated, is not in accordance with the principles of the United Nations. The question is whether this decision will have implications for world order? If such a decision would be read in light of what will be interpreted in Pristina, it will have major implications for the secessionist movements in the world. However, since in reality the Court did not consider the question of secession, the political implications will be discussed at the UN General Assembly." He added that Serbia would not recognise the unilateral proclaimed independence on the ground that "it believes that unilateral, ethnically motivated secession is not in accordance with the principles of the United Nations." He also announced that Serbia will call for talks for the solution of this historical problem and the Serbian-Albanian conflict. Serbian Foreign Minister Vuk Jeremić reiterated his country's position that they "will never recognise Kosovo's independence." He also expressed disappointment saying that Serbia wanted a "peaceful compromise solution" that did not set "dangerous secessionist precedents" for other parts of the world. However, he also added that "It is of crucial importance to keep the peace and to stabilise the entire territory of the province (Kosovo)," Vuk Jeremic, Serbia's foreign minister said. "It is crucial that our citizens do not react to provocations." He had previously said "Serbia will not change its position regarding Kosovo's unilateral declaration of independence and necessity of a compromise. Our fight for such a solution will probably be long and difficult, but we will not give up." He additionally warned that the ruling could encourage separatist movements to "write their [own] declarations of independence." An emergency parliamentary session was called for July 26 to discuss the opinion of the ICJ. The parliament was to give its own opinion on the decision and on the continuation of activities towards defending its sovereignty and territorial integrity. An emergency meeting of the government the day after the ruling decided that the government would submit an act to the parliament in order to try to achieve unity regarding the question of Serbia's territorial integrity among all state structures. Before the session Parliamentary Speaker Slavica Đukić Dejanović said the Serbian Parliament finds that a sustainable and mutually acceptable solution for Kosovo-Metohija should be reached through peaceful negotiations in line with the Constitution of Serbia. She also said the government's draft decision on the ICJ opinion reflects a stand that issues regarding sovereignty should be resolved through international law institutions and not through political influences. The session was attended by 215 out of 250 MPs to discuss the draft resolution which calls for "negotiations that would lead to a lasting solution and historical reconciliation between Serbs and ethnic Albanians" and "calls for national unity and announces that all available diplomatic and political means will be used to preserve Serbia's sovereignty and territorial integrity." The government proposed that Serbia submit a resolution to the UN at the General Assembly opening meet in September to push for a compromise solution to the problem of Kosovo. President Boris Tadić, Prime Minister Mirko Cvetković, all members of the government and the Head of Serbia's legal team before the ICJ, Dušan Bataković, were also present for the debate. The session was preceded by meetings with parliamentary groups, which was attended by the whips and their deputies. Shortly after the meeting began, the opposition Serb Progressive Party leader Tomislav Nikolić left; he was followed by the Democratic Party of Serbia whip Miloš Aligrudić and Serb Radical Party whip Dragan Todorović. Jeremić then addressed the MPs saying "55 countries are one step away from recognizing Kosovo [but the government is] doing everything" to prevent that. He said that Serbia's state organs were to be tasked with winning over a majority of countries at the UN General Assembly to vote in favour of the draft resolution, "after which it will be clear that the ICJ did not give (ethnic) Albanians a right to secede from Serbia." A resolution was adopted calling on the government to continue its activities defending the sovereignty and territorial integrity of the country. 192 voted in favour, 26 against and 2 abstained.: The Serbian Orthodox Church called for bells to be rung out.

== Former republics of Yugoslavia ==
Former Yugoslav republic	Response
Bosnia and Herzegovina	The President of Srpska Rajko Kuzmanovic told the American US Ambassador to Bosnia that the opinion could have far-reaching consequences on the preservation of stability and territorial integrity of all states worldwide with a complex ethnic composition of its population. He said Srpska would, however, adhere to the Dayton Peace Accords and to the principles of preservation of Serbia's territorial integrity. Prime Minister of Republika Srpska, Milorad Dodik also told the ambassador Srpska obeys the Dayton agreement and added that Bosnia could succeed in its course to the EU only as a functional state in which leaders can work on the establishment of the culture of dialogue and compromise. Dodik said that he believes the decision will have far-reaching consequences for the region, including Bosnia and Herzegovina. Though, he said Srpska would carefully study the decision, the ruling opened the possibility that Srpska could immediately declare independence and would not be a violation of international law. He added that Srpska has long been dissatisfied being a part of Bosnia and Herzegovina and there could be strong support for some of its future actions. However, he also said moves taken by Srpska must be calm, smart and not adventurous, "if this is not a violation of international law, then the future is on our side. He also said that "An additional fight for a status that does not breach international law, in line with the [ICJ’s] opinion, is not excluded. It would be interesting to see the reaction of the international community if we declared independence." He also said that "The ICJ opinion does not obligate anyone, but it does have legal power and it will certainly determine future relations, it is speculative and does not accept or support international law, in a legal sense." He added that the ruling would have an influence on the situation in Bosnia and the issue would be discussed in depth after elections in Bosnia-Herzegovina. He asserted that the ruling was "a new underestimation and humiliation of Serbia and a new message for the Serbs that only the politics of force and legal violence have a chance to succeed." On July 26, Prime Minister Milorad Dodik called for a special meeting among all parliamentary parties regarding the ICJ decision. Following the Serbian parliament's discussion he added that "We think it is best to follow Serbia's policy. The Serb Republic must not take a position of recognising Kosovo regardless of the fact that major world powers believe the ICJ opinion resolves the Kosovo issue." He reiterated support for Serbia's policy and supported the parliamentary resolution, saying we "will never abandon defending Serbia's position on Kosovo." The Serb president of the upper house of Bosnia's central parliament, Dusanka Majkic also said Srpska "now has all it needs to follow the same road Kosovo took if it decides to do so. As painful as this decision is, one way to interpret it is to say that if the RS decides to take the same road as Kosovo did, it too will be supported." The Croat member of Bosnia's tripartite presidency, Zeljko Komsic, said the ruling was "expected. I hope that this ruling will help everyone in the region to understand that the time of conflicts is over and that we must move on. This was the final chapter of the breakup of (former) Yugoslavia." He asserted his view that there will be some "political lunatics" who will try to draw parallels between the Srpska and Kosovo, but "political fanaticism and dangerous policies always end badly, as exemplified by how Hitler and Milosevic ended." He asserted that Kosovo was unlike Srpska because the latter was not a product of history or a long historical process. "It came into being as a result of war and it never enjoyed the status of a state, while Kosovo was an autonomous province of the former Yugoslavia and it had its government, parliament, judiciary and police as did all federal republics." The Bosniak member of the, Haris Silajdzic, said the ruling was "a result of wrong policies, particularly the policy of Slobodan Milosevic’s regime. Bosnia-Herzegovina was not pursuing such a policy, we were the victims of such a policy, including genocide. The integrity and sovereignty of Bosnia-Herzegovina are guaranteed and any attempt to undermine them will be prevented."
Croatia	Foreign minister Gordan Jandroković welcomed the advisory opinion saying "I believe that the advisory opinion will contribute to the stabilisation of the situation in the region."
Republic of Macedonia	The Ministry of Foreign Affairs said it feels the decision validates the international legal credibility of the policy of Macedonia in respect to the recognition of Kosovo. It also said that it believes the opinion of the ICJ provides a solid basis and a strong impetus to the promotion of good-neighbourly relations and regional cooperation, as well as to the opening of a new chapter in the building of mutual trust between the countries in the region.
Montenegro	Foreign Minister Milan Roćen said the advisory opinion would provide answers to a number of dilemmas. He also added that "The stability of the region is something that will bring us all together to progress faster on the path towards European integration."
Slovenia	Slovenia's Foreign Ministry welcomed the decision adding that it was a step towards a positive shift in relations between Kosovo and Serbia.

== International organisations ==
International organisations	Response
European Union	Prior to the verdict Yves Leterme said "The reaction of authorities in Serbia will be much more important than the opinion itself. Serbia is in favour of a sustainable solution, which cannot be one where one side gains everything, and the other loses." After the ruling the High Representative for Foreign and Security Policy Catherine Ashton welcomed the opinion and said the EU was ready to facilitate a dialogue between Kosovo and Serbia to promote cooperation as well as putting them both on a path to EU membership. The General Affairs Council and the Foreign Affairs Council was to convene in Brussels on 26 July to address the Kosovo situation in light of the advisory opinion. At the meeting Ashton reiterated her call for dialogue saying "The ICJ opinion is clear, and what I have offered to Pristina and Belgrade and spoken to President Tadic and Prime Minister Thaci about is that the future of both lies in the EU and dialogue should look at how we can move forward in the future. I hope they will come forward and start a discussion."
International Steering Group for Kosovo	The ISG said the opinion represents an important opportunity for Kosovo and Serbia to open a new phase of relations and "hopes for a sincere, respectful and constructive dialogue between Serbia and Kosovo, as independent and sovereign states, to identify and resolve practical issues of mutual interest to the benefit of the people of both countries."
OSCE	Secretary General of OSCE, Marc Perrin de Brichambaut, said the "OSCE takes note of the Advisory Opinion issued by the International Court of Justice. I want to emphasize that the OSCE Mission in Kosovo will continue its work as mandated in a status-neutral manner. The OSCE Mission remains committed to the development of a democratic multi-ethnic society, and it will continue to monitor and promote the rights of all communities living in Kosovo, and to support and strengthen the democratic institutions that it has helped create."
NATO	Secretary General of NATO, Anders Fogh Rasmussen, said that he has taken note of the court opinion and that the KFOR will still carry out its mandate of preserving the security and protection in an impartial manner throughout Kosovo.
United Nations	Secretary-General Ban Ki-moon urged Serbia and Kosovo to engage in a constructive dialogue and not make provocative steps that might derail the dialogue in response to the ruling. He also said the decision would be forwarded to the General Assembly. Some diplomats said the ruling underscored the clash between two cardinal principles dear to rank-and-file member states: self-determination, in this case for Kosovo's majority Albanians, and territorial integrity, in this case, Serbia's. One envoy said "It's not only the problem of Kosovo. It will be read in a lot of capitals on the basis not of the Kosovo case itself but of the general implications for each country. It's very difficult to guess what will be the reaction of the General Assembly."
UNPO	The Unrepresented Nations and Peoples Organization expressed support for the ruling and hoped it would bring about a resolution to similar disputes.

== Countries that recognise Kosovo ==
Countries that recognise Kosovo	Response
Albania	Albanian Prime Minister Sali Berisha hailed the ruling as a "historic decision" that would contribute to peace and stability in the Balkans.
Austria	Hannes Swoboda, the head of the Austrian Social Democrats in the European Parliament, said Kosovo's independence "is a problematic, but unavoidable step for the region" which completes the dissolution of the former Yugoslavia, and marks the establishment of a new order in the Balkan region.
Bulgaria	Foreign Minister Nickolay Mladenov said the ICJ's decision should serve for establishing dialogue and solving concrete problems in Kosovo; and that there should be “a new phase of relations between Serbia and Kosovo."
Canada	Foreign Affairs Minister Lawrence Cannon said the government was very happy with the decision and downplayed suggestions it could serve as a precedent for Quebec.
Czech Republic	The Czech Foreign Ministry released a statement welcoming the ICJ's advisory opinion. It expressed agreement with the EU's Foreign Policy Representative Catherine Ashton's declaration. Further, it stated that the opinion confirms the Czech policy towards Kosovo adopted upon recognition in May 2008.
Finland	Foreign Minister Alexander Stubb welcomed the advisory opinion. He also urged Serbia and Kosovo to look to the future and concentrate on the opportunity offered by the EU to engage in a process of constructive dialogue with a view to developing good neighbourly relations and regional cooperation in line with the EU's basic principles. "I give my full support to this EU offer put forward by High Representative Catherine Ashton."
France	Foreign minister Bernard Kouchner called for all states to recognise Kosovo. He added that "The [ICJ's] opinion clearly shows that Kosovo's declaration of independence is not contrary to any international law or resolution 1244, as France has always argued, and this pleases me."
Germany	Foreign minister Guido Westerwelle said that the ruling "confirms our legal view that the declaration of independence of the Republic of Kosovo was lawful." He said the verdict was a "unique decision," and "urge[d] political officials in both Belgrade and Pristina to now focus on their European future and start working in a constructive and pragmatic way on daily coexistence, in the interests of their people."
Italy	Foreign Minister Franco Frattini said that "As the ICJ confirmed, Serbia and Kosovo must continue negotiations, because there are many sensitive questions, ethnic, historical, cultural and religious, that must be solved" and that the ICJ's decision clearly states that Kosovo must remain a unique case and that it cannot cause a domino effect, since such an event would lead to a crisis of international relations.
Lithuania	Foreign Minister Audronius Ažubalis said that "facts and arguments based on the international law showed that Kosovo was a unique case and, therefore, it was not a precedent for solving conflicts in other regions of the world."
Norway	Foreign Minister Jonas Gahr Støre issued a statement saying "I welcome this important advisory opinion by the Court. We now call on the Republic of Serbia and the Republic of Kosovo to take fully part in the project of helping the region to put its troubled past behind it. We reiterate our full support to the principles of the United Nations Charter and to the International Court of Justice, which is the principal judicial organ of the United Nations."
Turkey	The Foreign Ministry said the opinion "should be considered as a new window of opportunity for the establishment of lasting peace and stability in the Balkans" and that it provided an impetus for Kosovo to develop a positive dialogue with Serbia.
United Kingdom	The Foreign Secretary William Hague said: "I welcome the International Court of Justice's Advisory Opinion on Kosovo, which confirms that that Kosovo's Declaration of Independence did not violate international law. Kosovo has been functioning as an independent State for 2½ years. I encourage other States that have not so far recognised Kosovo now to do so. Kosovo is a unique case and does not set a precedent. The delivery of the ICJ's Advisory Opinion is an important milestone in the journey towards Kosovo and Serbia's EU future. The legal process before the ICJ has now come to its end. This means an end to debate about Kosovo's status. It means a renewed focus on improving the lives of ordinary people of all communities in Kosovo and Serbia through co-operation between the two States. Kosovo and Serbia must look forward to the next stages of their progress towards becoming EU Member States. The UK holds firm in its conviction that Kosovo's status as a State and with its territory defined by its existing borders is a positive force for stability in the Western Balkans. I urge both Kosovo and Serbia to embrace this opportunity to reconcile and to become good neighbours. Kosovo and Serbia together must forge a new path built on the values at the root of the EU's existence: democracy, rule of law and peaceful co-existence of States. Baroness Ashton has offered the EU's support in helping Kosovo and Serbia to do this, and I hope the offer will be accepted. I reaffirm the UK's support for the EU perspective of Serbia and Kosovo."
United States	White House spokesman Mike Hammer said "We were pleased that the court agreed with the long-standing view of the United States that Kosovo's declaration of independence is in accordance with international law." Secretary of State Hillary Rodham Clinton noted that the opinion accords with the views set forth in the State Department's submissions to the Court. She added that "Kosovo is an independent state and its territory is inviolable. [All states should] move beyond the issue of Kosovo's status and engage constructively in support of peace and stability in the Balkans." She called on those states that have not yet recognised Kosovo to do so, while concluding: "Serbia and Kosovo are both friends and partners of the United States. Now is the time for them to put aside their differences and move forward, working together constructively to resolve practical issues and improve the lives of the people of Kosovo, Serbia, and the region. This is the path toward their future, as part of a Europe, whole, free, and at peace, and we welcome the European Union’s efforts to assist both countries in realizing their European aspirations." In a Foreign Press Center briefing, US legal adviser Harold Koh emphasized that "the court made clear that issues about secession were beyond the scope of its decision, and so they didn’t pass on those questions." Assistant Secretary at the State Department, Philip H. Gordon, said, "I would also underscore that the court’s opinion was closely tailored to the unique circumstances of Kosovo. This was about Kosovo. It was not about other regions or states. It doesn’t set any precedent for other regions or states. Kosovo's independence is a fact...That needs to be the starting point for any discussion...This shouldn’t be seen as a win or a loss for anyone. It’s an opportunity for everybody to win, and it’s not anti-Serbia, it is as I say, an opportunity to get on with what will be in the interest of both countries." A spokesman for the U.S. State Department has said "The ICJ ruling strongly asserts that Kosovo's declaration of independence is legal, a judgement we support" and called on Europe to unite behind a common future. He also said the court ruling "decisively agreed with the longstanding view of the United States that Kosovo's declaration of independence is in accordance with international law ... and its territory is inviolable. We call on those states, who have not yet done so, to recognize Kosovo. Now is the time for them – for Kosovo and Serbia to put aside their differences and move forward, working together constructively to resolve practical issues to the betterment of the lives of the people of Kosovo, Serbia, and the region. This is the path forward – this is the path toward their future, as part of a Europe, whole, free, and at peace." When asked by a reporter about concerns in Spain and the precedence for the Basque country and Catalonia he said "But this was a very – a set of facts unique to Kosovo. The court was applying these facts. We don't think it's applicable to any other situation." American diplomats said the right time to move forward and reach an agreement, however they added the caveat "that shall not be possible as long as the story over Kosovo is being led by Serbian Foreign Minister Vuk Jeremic. The USA and the EU are now requesting from Serbia not to insist on the resolution at the UN or at least not on the wording requesting negotiations over the status. Should Serbia however decide to submit its resolution, the USA or Albania would file a resolution." The ambassador of the United States in Pristina denied saying Thaci was "prepared to offer to the north of Kosovo a kind of autonomy" modeled after autonomies implemented in the regions of Belgium, Austria and other Western European countries. Instead is said the U.S. government strongly supports Kosovo's status "as an independent state," and its "territorial integrity."

== Countries that do not recognise Kosovo ==
Countries that do not recognise Kosovo	Response
Armenia	The Foreign Ministry cited a 2008 statement by President Serzh Sarkisian that said recognition of Kosovo, South Ossetia and Abkhazia would not be forthcoming "as long as it has not recognized the Nagorno-Karabakh Republic." Eduard Sharmazanov, a spokesman for the ruling Republican Party of Armenia said "this is an unprecedented decision that can positively impact international recognition of Karabakh.... Because for the first [time] ever an international court ruled that when it comes to independence, the people's right to self-determination is more important [than the] territorial integrity of states." A parliamentary group MP from the party, Lernik Alexanyan, said the verdict is in Armenia's interests, however one should not have great expectations. He noted that the judgment provides for a legal basis that might contribute to a shifting of the Karabakh peace process from the political into a legal framework; according to him, the verdict should open Azerbaijan's eyes to realise there is a possibility for the conflict's resolution based on international law. The coordinator of the Armenian National Congress Levon Zurabyan said that though he had not thoroughly studied the verdict, he expressed confidence that it contains certain useful provisions that may be applied to the resolution of the Nagorno-Karabakh conflict. He said the peace process should now undergo considerable changes. "Kosovo's independence was proclaimed on the basis of remedial right to secede. Today, international law permits broadening of the right to self-determination up to separation, in case the rights of a self-determined people were violated. Meanwhile, it is the most efficient way to advance the Karabakh issue." He stressed that the Armenian foreign office does not, however, draw enough attention to this fact. Armenian Revolutionary Federation parliamentary group leader Vahan Hovhannesyan welcomed the resolution believing it to be a new tool in Armenia's struggle for recognition of Nagorno-Karabakh's independence. He said it was a just verdict. "Formation of a new state through secession from another does not run counter to international law. Armenia has no right to address UN Court demanding to resolve Karabakh issue. Drawing an analogy between two cases, I'd say it's Azerbaijan who has to apply to the court. Azerbaijan, however, will never undertake the step, envisaging a totally different resolution to Karabakh issue. [The] U.S. statement on the intention to continue with struggle for Kosovo independence regardless of International Court verdict arises concern, suggesting devaluation of world court rulings. The approach is incorrect. The law is either observed or it's not. It cannot be applied in one case and disrespected in another." Party leader, Kiro Manoyan, said the ruling is important to Armenia as it acknowledges Nagorno-Karabakh's independence doesn't run counter to international law; he also elucidated that the latter's independence was declared in accordance with international law, as well as USSR legislation. he then urged an undertaking towards international recognition of Nagorno-Karabakh's independence.
Azerbaijan	The Foreign Ministry said "the resolutions of the UN International Court are recommendations and have no binding force. Second, the UN International Court has not yet responded about the legitimacy of the creation of Kosovo as a state. We can also stress the fair arguments, voiced by the Russian Foreign Ministry, which said in its statement yesterday that the UN International Court did not consider the legitimacy of the unilateral proclamation of independence by Kosovo, did not refer to possible implications of such a proclamation and did not say whether Kosovo was a state or not." It also noted that unlike the Kosovo issue, which was being dealt with by the UN, the conflict over Nagorno-Karabakh was being resolved through the mediation of the Organization for Security and Cooperation in Europe. It insisted that the ICJ ruling applies only to Kosovo and Serbia and cannot have any ramifications for the Karabakh conflict. Spokesman Elkhan Polukhov was quoted as saying that Azerbaijan would continue to regard Kosovo as a part of Serbia. Azeri leaders have also repeatedly stated that Karabakh's predominantly Armenian population should only be able to determine the extent of the territory's autonomy within Azerbaijan, arguing that among other things, there already exists an independent Armenian state.
Belarus	Ministry of Foreign Affairs issued a statement saying "We ascertain that the International Court of Justice has not assessed the right to unilateral secession of Kosovo from Serbia. In this regard, the Republic of Belarus is still of the opinion that the solution to the problem of Kosovo's status should be sought through dialogue of all stakeholders with the participation of the UN Security Council."
China	Ministry of Foreign Affairs spokesperson Qin Gang said that "China respects the sovereignty and territorial integrity of Serbia. China is of the view that the ICJ's advisory opinion does not hinder the parties involved from properly solving the issue through negotiations. China firmly believes that the respect of national sovereignty and territorial integrity is the basic principle of international law, and the basis of today's global legal system."
Cyprus	Foreign Minister Markos Kyprianou said "The decision of the ICJ is restricted only to the specific question which refers to the procedure of the declaration itself. At the same time we believe that when a territorial integrity of a country is concerned, the issue is to be resolved by means of talks and negotiations, and not by unilaterally declaring independence." The Cypriot Foreign Ministry reiterate its position of principle on the issue of Kosovo and reaffirm its unwavering position of respect to the sovereignty and territorial integrity of Serbia, which includes the Kosovo and Metohija province.
Greece	Alternate Foreign Minister Dimitris Droutsas said that "despite the advisory opinion of the International Court, Greece, like other EU countries that do not recognize Kosovo, maintains its position."
India	External affairs ministry spokesperson, Vishnu Prakash said "Our position on Kosovo's UDI has not changed."
Indonesia	Foreign Ministry spokesman, Teuku Faizasyah, said the government would look further into the decision. "For the record, the ICJ's ruling was not unanimous and there was dissenting opinion. The ruling was more of a procedural matter and cannot be defined as a recognition of the freedom of Kosovo legally." Defence Ministry spokesman, I Wayan Midhio, said there would not be growing separatist movements affected by the ruling. "A country's sovereignty and integrity is part of its national interest and a country is obliged to improve its people's welfare. When that obligation is missed, separatist movements will rise." He asserted that the 2004 Regional Autonomy Law secured welfare in all regions. Golkar MP Tantowi Yahya who was on the House of Representatives' Commission I overseeing communications military and international affairs said the ruling would inspire separatist movement elsewhere; though he added "But separatist movements in Papua and Aceh provinces, for instance, are different from that in Kosovo in terms of historical backgrounds," and that the Indonesian government dealt with separatists in a different manner than the Serbian government's methods using welfare programmes instead of using military force. Ahmad Muzani of the Great Indonesia Movement Party also said "With or without the international court's ruling, the threat of separatist movements in Aceh and Papua is already established. With the international court handing down such a ruling, it may indeed inspire separatists." He added that the Indonesian government needed to take immediate measures because it had not yet completely resolved problems in places like Papua where the government refused to enter serious dialogue with separatists and that the provinces share of revenues doesn't reach its people. "The money falls, not to the people, but to local administration officials. Jakarta has once again failed."
Iran	Foreign Minister Manouchehr Mottaki spoke with Kosovo Foreign Minister Skender Hyseni and reiterated his view about the necessity of living up to major principles of the international law on sovereignty and territorial integrity of all countries and that "different aspects of the advisory ruling of the ICJ on Kosovo's unique situation is being studied carefully and we hope the issues will be settled through talks." Hyseni responded in saying "considering significance of Iran's support for Kosovo, we call for the country to recognize Kosovo's independence." Foreign Ministry Spokesman Ramin Mehman-Parast said "The Islamic Republic of Iran is considering the consultative ruling issued by the International Court of Justice on the special status of Kosovo. As before, the Islamic Republic of Iran lays emphasis on respect for the principles of the international law and continues to believe that dialogue and agreement among the disputing parties in a constructive and progressive atmosphere is the only effective step in achieving a proper solution to provide for the rights of the citizens and establish durable peace and stability in the Balkan region."
Moldova	Acting President Mihai Ghimpu said that "the decision of the International Court in The Hague regarding the independence of Kosovo will not affect the process of reintegration of Moldova."
Romania	The Ministry of Foreign Affairs took note about the advisory opinion to have a detailed analysis in the future. The first glimpse, however, revealed that the UN's question itself imposed a narrow and very specific view on the legality of the declaration instead of judging the consequences of the declaration. Therefore, the ICJ had judged only the legality of the declaration of independence itself, not the legal status of Kosovo as a consequence of the declaration and not the jurisdictional effects of the recognition of Kosovo. The ICJ also does not clarify if unilateral declaration allowed for the legal creation of the state nor if international law allows secession. In these conditions, the Ministry would continue in its opposition to Kosovo's recognition.
Russia	Russia's Foreign Ministry stated it has not changed its position opposing Kosovo's recognition. Leonid Slutsky, the deputy-head of the Duma Foreign Affairs Committee, raised concerns that the ruling could open a "Pandora's box" increasing claims of independence by other separatist states. It also said "We believe that the solution to the Kosovo issue lies only in the continuation of negotiations between the interested parties based on the provisions of UN Security Council resolution 1244, which, as underlined by the International Court of Justice, remains the universally recognised international legal basis for settlement."
Slovakia	Foreign Minister Mikuláš Dzurinda said that the Slovak position remains the same and that the status of Kosovo should be the result of an agreement between the parties, or determined by the UN Security Council Resolution. Minister of Defence Ľubomír Galko stated that the ICJ ruling "changed nothing" and that "Slovakia's position remains unchanged. The Republic of Slovakia still does not recognize the unilaterally declared independence of Kosovo."
Spain	Deputy Prime Minister María Teresa Fernández de la Vega said Spain would continue to respect the UN resolution regarding borders drawn after the end of the Bosnian civil war in 1995. Foreign Minister Miguel Ángel Moratinos expressed his "respect" for the court's decision, which is not binding, but added that it will "in no case change the position of Spain's non-recognition of Kosovo." He said that the decision "opens a new phase" based on dialogue with Serbia and that "the only way of resolving conflicts is through dialogue." At an EU meeting he stated "We are not going to recognise Kosovo, that is our position."
Ukraine	Foreign Ministry spokesman said that the court's decision does not alter the position of Ukraine on the non-recognition of Kosovo's independence from Serbia and that "Based on the fundamental international instruments, primarily the UN Charter, the Helsinki Final Act of 1975, the Paris Charter of the OSCE in 1990, Ukraine adheres to the principle of territorial integrity of all states in the internationally recognised borders."

== States with limited or no recognition ==
States with limited or no recognition	Response
Abkhazia	President Sergei Bagapsh stated that the decision of the ICJ has once again confirmed the right to self-determination of Abkhazia and South Ossetia and that South Ossetia and Abkhazia have more historical and legal grounds for independence than Kosovo. Prime Minister Sergei Shamba stated that the decision of the ICJ shall strengthen the position of Abkhazia.
Nagorno-Karabakh	President Bako Sahakian hailed the ruling as an "important event" that would create a "new political situation" in the Nagorno-Karabakh. "That decision has an extremely important legal, political and moral significance and sets a precedent that can not be confined to Kosovo. [Karabakh’s predominantly Armenian population broke away from Azerbaijani rule] in full compliance with the basic principles of international law" and is therefore also entitled to international recognition. He added that "If the recognition of Kosovo’s independence by the World Court contributes to the NKR’s international recognition, we can only welcome it. The NKR and Armenia must voice the same opinion." Masis Mailyan, the chairman of the Public Council for Foreign Policy and Security, said he welcomes the verdict because "as a precedent, it is supposed to play an important role in the international recognition of the Nagorno-Karabakh Republic. The West backed Kosovo's independence, while Abkhazia and South Ossetia were recognized by Russia and some other countries. Thus, the U.S., EU, Russia, as well as a number of other states, consider recognition the most effective mechanism of ensuring stability in the conflict zones. This international practice must be applied to Artsakh as well." Mass celebrations were organised in the capital Stepanakert and other towns to support the decision of the ICJ.
South Ossetia	Deputy Foreign Minister Kazbulat Tskhovrebov stated "It is crucial to note that the court gave an assessment of only the Declaration of Independence itself. However, in my opinion, this decision can be regarded as an indirect recognition of Kosovo's independence, which would push other countries to its recognition. We hope that the issue of independence of South Ossetia and Abkhazia will also be seen in the UN and that we will have the opportunity to prove at such a high podium, that the proclamation of independence of South Ossetia was not contrary to international law".
Transnistria	Foreign Ministry welcomed the ruling and said that the decision is "a landmark" and "model" for other entities seeking independence. It called on the UN and individual states to recognise Transdniester as soon as possible as an independent state, especially as it has functioned "as a de facto state" for 20 years.

== State and non-state nationalist movements ==
Nationalist movements	Response
(Basque Country (autonomous community)) Basque Nationalist Party ( (Spain) )	MP Aitor Estaban said "I think that the main consequence is that Spain cannot keep saying that the international rules don't allow for a split of the country for a new Basque independent country into the European Union. So I think that should be already over and that's good news for us."
Republican Left of Catalonia ( (Spain) )	Following the ICJ decision, the Catalan nationalist parties expressed that there are clear parallels between their case and Kosovo's. Joan Puigcercós, the President of the Republican Left of Catalonia, stated that the ICJ decision shows that Catalonia's independence could be legal and recognised at an international level. The Democratic Convergence of Catalonia party asked the Spanish Government to recognise Kosovo's independence and the right of self-determination of the people. The Republican Left of Catalonia has proposed in Congress that Spain should recognise Kosovo as an independent country. They stated that the "International Court of Justice, by declaring the legality and legitimacy of the unilateral declaration of Kosovo, has dismantled the Spanish Government's argument to oppose" the independence of Kosovo.
Republic of Texas ( (United States) )	The leader of the Texas Nationalist Movement Daniel Miller said that the ICJ opinion has "tremendous meaning" for Texas. "While we decry the erosion of sovereignty to international bodies, the fact is that the United States government has systematically taken away the sovereignty of Texas and passed it along to international institutions which, by and large, do not represent the values of Texans."
(Scotland) Scottish National Party ( (United Kingdom) )	MEP Alyn Smith hailed the ruling of the court saying "this decision may not be of quite the same significance as a domestic political instrument, as it is as an international precedent." He also said the ruling was of "crucial importance" in bringing stability in the region; and he added that he expects many more countries to recognise Kosovo as a result of the decision.
Székely Land ( (Romania) )	European Parliament vice-president László Tőkés spoke about the issues of Hungarians in Transylvania "If one so small province such as Kosovo won the autonomy, the same thing is possible for the Székely Land. If necessary, we should take it to the streets".

== See also ==
- International recognition of Kosovo
