= Overton High School =

Overton High School may refer to:

- Overton High School (Nebraska) in Overton, Nebraska
- Overton High School (Tennessee) in Memphis, Tennessee
- Overton High School (Texas) in Overton, Texas
- John Overton High School in Nashville, Tennessee
