= Legal status of Texas =

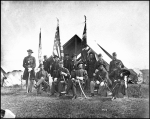
United States Army, First Battalion, First Infantry Regiment soldiers in Texas in 1861.

The legal status of Texas is the standing of Texas as a political entity. While Texas has been part of various political entities throughout its history, including 10 years during 1836–1846 as the independent Republic of Texas, the current legal status is as a state of the United States of America.

Due to Texas's unique history, United States sovereignty over Texas has been disputed at times. Adherents of secessionist movements claim that American sovereignty is illegal, although this viewpoint is not widely held. Disputes over the legal status of Texas have revolved around key issues that include, but are not limited to, the legitimacy of its re-admittance to the Union following the Civil War, differing viewpoints over its de facto and de jure international standing, and perceived discrepancies between its original and current boundaries.

Regardless, a minority viewpoint, as expressed by some factions such as Republic of Texas (group), has persisted, asserting that Texas remains an independent nation and that American actions in the American Civil War have resulted in an illegal military occupation of Texas. The debate is considered by some to resemble academic discourse being argued by several other activist groups in the United States, most notably arguments over the legal status of Hawaii and the legal status of Alaska. The situation most closely resembles that of Hawaii, as Hawaii was also annexed via a joint resolution of Congress.

== History ==
Prior to the revolution that resulted in the creation of the Republic of Texas in 1836, the area now included in the State of Texas was part of Mexico.

On March 1, 1845, the United States Congress enacted a joint resolution to annex Texas. On June 23, 1845, the Texas Congress accepted the United States Congress's joint resolution, and consented to Anson Jones's calling of a convention to be held on July 4, 1845. A Texas convention debated the annexation offer and almost unanimously passed an ordinance assenting to it on July 4, 1845. The convention debated through August 28, and adopted the Constitution of the State of Texas on August 27, 1845. On December 29, 1845, Texas was admitted as the twenty-eighth state.

On February 1, 1861, a special convention in Texas adopted an ordinance of secession that repealed the ordinance of annexation and seceded from the United States; the vote was166 to 8.. On February 7, the Legislature ordered a public referendum to be held on the ordinance of secession. The next day, Governor Sam Houston issued a proclamation calling for a referendum to be held on February 23. On February 23, citizens of Texas voted overwhelmingly to secede from the United States, 46,153 to 14,747 During the American Civil War, Texas was invaded by Union troops many times including the final major clash of the war which was the Battle of Palmito Ranch, on May 12–13, 1865.

On June 17, 1865, President Andrew Johnson appointed Andrew Jackson Hamilton as the provisional civilian governor of the state and directed him to convene a constitutional convention restricted to loyal Americans. On March 15, 1866, the convention enacted an ordinance repealing the ordinance of secession. A referendum was held on June 25, 1866, pursuant to the laws then in force on March 29, for the ratification of the amendments proposed by the convention. In March 1867 under the More Efficient Government of the Rebel States established under the first of the Reconstruction Acts, by General Orders No. 10, Gen. Philip Sheridan was appointed military governor of the Fifth Military District.

In February 1869, the Supreme Court ruled in Texas v. White that the secession had been illegal, that the Union was insoluble by actions of a state, and that states therefore did not have the right to secede.

== Historical legal actions ==
The political status of Texas has been questioned legally at various times subsequent to its re-admittance to the Union. Two landmark Supreme Court decisions set the prevailing precedent on the status of Texas.

- Texas v. White: In 1869, the United States Supreme Court ruled that secession of Texas from the United States was illegal. The court wrote, "The Constitution, in all its provisions, looks to an indestructible Union, composed of indestructible States." The court did allow some possibility of the divisibility "through revolution, or through consent of the States."
- DeLima v. Bidwell: Annexation via a joint resolution of Congress is legal. The Supreme Court wrote, "A treaty made by that power is said to be the supreme law of the land, as efficacious as an act of Congress; and, if subsequent and inconsistent with an act of Congress, repeals it. This must be granted, and also that one of the ordinary incidents of a treaty is the cession of territory, and that the territory thus acquired is acquired as absolutely as if the annexation were made, as in the case of Texas and Hawaii, by an act of Congress."

== Recent legal actions ==
This section deals primarily with modern theoretical arguments regarding Texas' de jure status under certain interpretations of international law, a focal point of modern assertions regarding alternate viewpoints on Texas' established legal status as a state of the United States of America. These arguments are illustrated in legal actions brought by proponents of these viewpoints.

=== Colorado case ===
In 2003, Timothy Paul Kootenay, in jail in Aspen, Colorado, claimed that the state of Colorado had no jurisdiction to extradite him to California on a probation warrant on the grounds that he was a citizen of the Republic of Texas. He claimed that the sliver of land which contains Aspen was a part of the original Republic of Texas and, as such, he was not a citizen of the United States. His claim was rejected by the courts.

=== Richard McLaren: Petition to the International Court of Justice and in U.S. District Court ===
In 1995, a petition was filed with the International Court of Justice in The Hague, The Netherlands, by Richard L. McLaren asking that the Republic of Texas be declared to still exist. The clerk at the International Court of Justice declined to file the case and replied

I have to inform you, however, that the function of the International Court of Justice is confined to the settling, in accordance with international law, of legal disputes submitted to it by States, and to the rendering of advisory opinions on legal questions referred to it by duly authorized international organs and agencies. It follows that neither the Court nor its Members can consider applications from private individuals, or other entities, or provide them with legal advice, or assist them in their relations with the authorities in any country. As a result, no action will be taken on your letter.

A descriptive handbook published in 2004 by the International Court of Justice states that "Only States may be parties to cases before the Court" and the Court will only decide disputes which are "submitted to it by States."

Regarding these types of petitions, the International Court of Justice handbook states:

Hardly a day passes without the Registry receiving written or oral applications from private persons. However heart-rending, however well-founded, such applications may be, the ICJ is unable to entertain them and a standard reply is always sent: 'Under Article 34 of the Statute, only States may be parties in cases before the Court.'

McLaren was ultimately unsuccessful in his effort. He filed in the United States District Court for the District of Columbia, which stated in its decision on April 30, 1998, "Despite plaintiffs' argument ... [i]n 1845, Texas became the 28th state of the United States of America. The Republic of Texas no longer exists."

== U.S. legislation ==
- Joint Resolution for Annexing Texas to the United States, March 1, 1845
- Presidential Proclamation Declaring a State of Peace Between Texas and the United States, August 20, 1866
- An Act to admit the State of Texas to Representation in the Congress of the United States. March 30, 1870

== See also ==
- Alaskan Independence Party
- Dominion of British West Florida (micronation)
- Law of Texas
- Legal status of Alaska
- Legal status of Hawaii
- Republic of Texas (group)
- Texas in the American Civil War
- Texas secession movements
- Tribal sovereignty
