= Law of Texas =

The law of Texas is derived from the Constitution of Texas and consists of several levels, including constitutional law, statutory law, regulatory law, case law, as well as local laws and regulations. Each level establishes a framework for the relationship between the state, local governments, and its people. By defining power, responsibility, and the limitation of these entities, the law of Texas provides the structural and legal foundation upon which Texas and local governments operate and influence policy decisions across all local levels.

== Sources ==
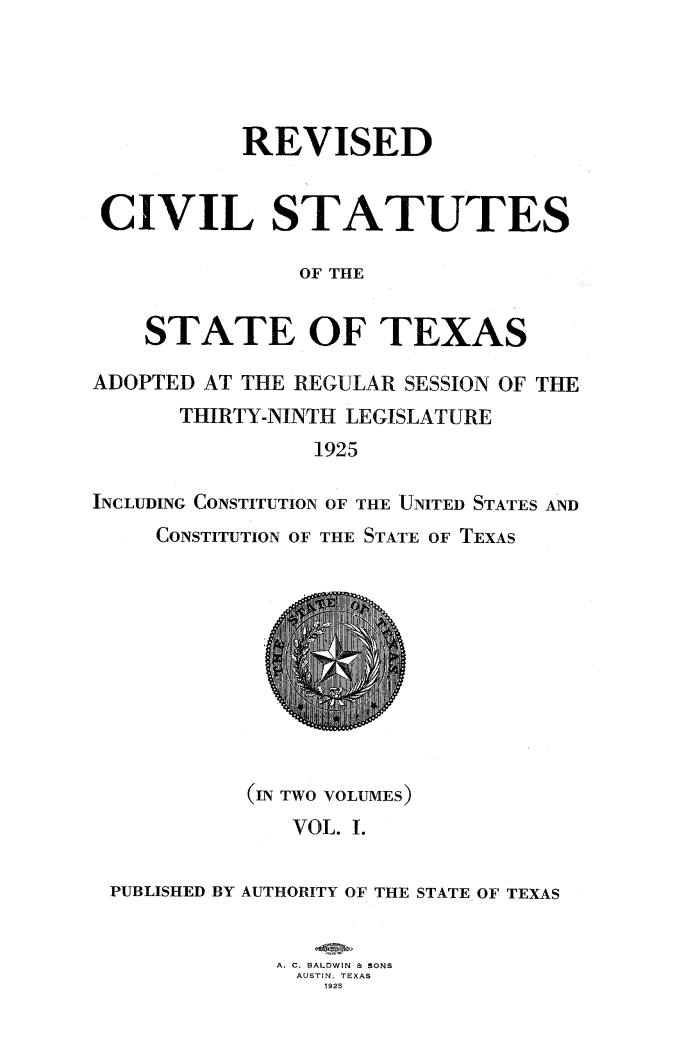
Title page of the Revised Civil Statutes from 1925

The Constitution of Texas is the foremost source of state law. Legislation is enacted by the Texas Legislature, published in the General and Special Laws, and codified in the Texas Statutes. State agencies publish regulations (sometimes called administrative law) in the Texas Register, which are in turn codified in the Texas Administrative Code. The Texas legal system is based on common law, which is interpreted by case law through the decisions of the Supreme Court, the Court of Criminal Appeals, and the Courts of Appeals, which are published in the Texas Cases and South Western Reporter. Counties and municipal governments may also promulgate local ordinances.

=== Constitution of Texas ===
The Constitution of Texas is the foundation of the government of Texas and vests the legislative power of the state in the Texas Legislature. The Texas Constitution is subject only to the sovereignty of the people of Texas as well as the Constitution of the United States, although this is disputed.

Article I of the Constitution of Texas contains the following provisions related to limitations on legislative power:

1. Sec. 16 prohibits bills of attainder, ex post facto or retroactive laws, or laws "impairing the obligations of contracts."
2. Sec. 29 provides that "no power of suspending laws in this State shall be exercised except by the Legislature.

Article II of the Constitution of Texas mandates the separation of powers in to three distinct department, the Legislative, Executive, and Judicial.

Article III of the Constitution of Texas is specifically dedicated to the Legislative Department.

=== Legislation ===
Pursuant to the state constitution, the Texas Legislature has enacted various laws, known as "chapter laws" or generically as "slip laws". These are published in the official General and Special Laws of the State of Texas as "session laws". Most of these statutes are codified.

The Texas Constitution requires the Texas Legislature to revise, digest, and publish the laws of the state; however, it has never done so regularly. In 1925 the Texas Legislature reorganized the statutes into three major divisions: the Revised Civil Statutes, Penal Code, and Code of Criminal Procedure. In 1963, the Texas legislature began a major revision of the 1925 Texas statutory classification scheme, and as of 1989 over half of the statutory law had been arranged under the recodification process.

The de facto codifications are Vernon's Texas Statutes Annotated and Vernon's Texas Codes Annotated, commonly known as Vernon's. The unannotated constitution, codes, and statutes can also be accessed online through a website of the Texas Legislative Council. Gammel's Laws of Texas contains relevant legislation from 1822-1897.

Most, but not all, Texas statutes have been codified in the following codes:

1. Agriculture Code
2. Alcoholic Beverage Code
3. Business and Commerce Code
4. Business Organizations Code
5. Civil Practice and Remedies Code
6. Code Of Criminal Procedure
7. Education Code
8. Election Code
9. Estates Code
10. Family Code
11. Finance Code
12. Government Code
13. Health and Safety Code
14. Human Resources Code
15. Insurance Code
16. Labor Code
17. Local Government Code
18. Natural Resources Code
19. Occupations Code
20. Parks and Wildlife Code
21. Penal Code
22. Property Code
23. Special District Local Laws Code
24. Tax Code
25. Transportation Code
26. Utilities Code
27. Water Code

=== Regulations ===
The body of regulations promulgated by state agencies is referred to as administrative law. The Texas Administrative Code contains the compiled and indexed regulations of Texas state agencies and is published yearly by the Secretary of State. The Texas Register contains proposed rules, notices, executive orders, and other information of general use to the public and is published weekly by the Secretary of State. Both are also available online through the Secretary of State's website.

=== Case law ===
The Texas legal system is based on common law, which is interpreted by case law through the decisions of the Texas Supreme Court, the Texas Court of Criminal Appeals, and the Texas Courts of Appeals. There is no longer an officially published reporter. West's Texas Cases (a Texas-specific version of the South Western Reporter) includes reported opinions of the Supreme Court, the Court of Criminal Appeals, and the Courts of Appeals. The Texas Reports includes Supreme Court opinions until July 1962, and the Texas Criminal Reports includes Court of Criminal Appeals opinions until November 1962. Appellate opinions from 1997–2002 onwards are generally available online.

There is no systematic reporting of decisions of trial courts. Online availability of case filings at the trial court level varies drastically: some district courts and county courts at law allow online access to download case filings, either for free or for a fee, either to registered users (sometimes restricted by attorney status) or to all users, whereas other trial courts only allow online access to the clerk's register of actions or the case docket, or no online access at all. For example, the Harris County District Clerk's website requires users to register for free in order to download case filings. The Harris County Clerk similarly requires registration in order to download case filings, though the search function is available to unregistered users. In Dallas County, the District Clerk and County Clerk's records are available from a single online portal which allows for most non-sensitive case filings to be downloaded without registration. Filings from all 254 Texas counties can be searched by registered users for free through the statewide re:SearchTX portal, though a payment of $.10 (ten cents) per page is required for downloads.

=== Local ordinances ===
Municipal governments may promulgate local ordinances, rules, and police regulations, and are usually codified in a "code of ordinances". Counties in Texas have limited regulatory (ordinance) authority. Some codes are printed by private publishers, and some are available online, but the most common method of discovering local ordinances is by physically traveling to the seat of government and asking around. The responsibility of regulating local ordinances lies within the government positions of elected and appointed officials, and various departments within the municipality itself. For example, at the municipal level the city council holds the responsibility of adopting, amending, and repealing ordinances. This is done by debating and voting on each issue. Similarly, a mayor holds significant power and has the ability to influence the regulation of local ordinances through agenda setting, veto power, and overall executive leadership. Lastly, the commissioners court plays a role in addressing issues of public health and safety regulations, road and bridge maintenance, and emergency management throughout the whole county. Although governing bodies such as mayors, city councils, and commissioners court are limited to authority due to preemption, they still play a vital role in the functioning of a city when considering laws, regulations, health, and safety.

== Age of criminal responsibility ==
Criminal courts in Texas have automatic jurisdiction over all persons over 17 years of age. As of 2017 there was advocacy to raise the age to 18. The Texas House of Representatives passed such a bill in 2017 that would be effective 2021. In August 2017 there were thirty-three prisoners in adult prisons and/or state jails who were below the age of 18.

In Texas the minimum age at which a child may be adjudicated as delinquent is 10.

== Murder statutes ==
Capital murder convictions have two options: life imprisonment without parole and death. Capital punishment or death penalty, is known as the state-sanctioned killing of a person as punishment for the most serious crimes. These capital offenses typically include murder but extend to other crimes of treason, espionage, or certain drug-related offenses. The process of capital punishment is carried out through a legal process of conviction in a court of law, being held on death row, then lastly carrying out the execution. Prior to 2005, life with parole and death were the two options, but that year the Texas Legislature modified the statute. Maurice Chammah, author of Let the Lord Sort Them: The Rise and Fall of the Death Penalty, stated that governments of smaller counties supported the move as death penalty cases had increasing costs. Although there are no definite numbers of Texas counties taking a stand for or against the death penalty, it can be accurately said that more than half (136 out of 254) have never sent an offender to death row since the death penalty reinstatement of 1976. On a larger scale, less than 20% of the 254 Texas counties account for the current death row population. Similarly, three counties contribute to more than half of the current death row population in Texas: Harris (64), Dallas (13), and Tarrant (13).

== See also ==
=== Topics ===
- Alcohol laws of Texas
- Capital punishment in Texas
- Expungement in Texas
- Felony murder rule (Texas)
- Gambling in Texas
- Gun laws in Texas
- Deregulation of the Texas electricity market
- LGBT rights in Texas
- Legal status of Texas

=== Other ===
- Politics of Texas
- Law enforcement in Texas
- Crime in Texas
- Law of the United States
