= Overton High School (Texas) =

Location
- 111 East McKay Street; Overton, Texas 75684; United States; 32.274509°N 94.973466°W

Information
- Former name: Overton Colored High School
- School type: Public high school
- Established: 1932
- School district: Overton Independent School District
- Principal: Cindy Bundrick
- Staff: 27.25 (FTE)
- Grades: 6-12
- Enrollment: 272 (2023–2024)
- Student to teacher ratio: 9.98
- Colors: Kelly green, white, and black
- Athletics conference: UIL Class 2A
- Mascot: Mustang
- Rival: Carlisle Indians (Price, Texas)
- Yearbook: Los Tejas
- Website: Overton High School

Overton High School is a public high school located in Overton, Texas (US) and classified as a 2A school by the UIL. It is part of the Overton Independent School District located in northwestern Rusk County. In addition to the immediate Overton vicinity, the campus also serves rural areas in eastern Smith County. In 2013, the school was rated "Met Standard" by the Texas Education Agency.

== Band ==
The marching band has won numerous state marching competitions throughout its history (most recently in 2001 as State Marching Champions (Texas) and 2003 State Honor band.

- UIL Marching Band State Champions
  - 2001(1A)

== Theater ==
The Theatre department has a long string of State UIL One Act Play appearances, with a 20-year streak of district championships led by longtime Drama instructor Lillian Cohagen, who retired in 1980. In 1997 OHS won a state Class 1A One Act Play championship with Confederate Letters, written and directed by Barre Gonzalez

- One Act Play
  - 1997(1A)

== Athletics ==
The Overton Mustangs compete in these sports -

- Baseball
- Basketball
- Cross Country
- Football
- Golf
- Softball
- Tennis
- Track and Field
- Volleyball

The Mustang football team competes in Coach Chester Roy Stadium, named in honor of the first African-American member of the faculty following desegregation. Coach Roy's tenure spanned more than thirty years as a coach and educator, before his death in 2005. Overton's football program is notable for having won at least one district championship in every single decade starting in the 1930s, including a string of state playoff appearances from the 1980s through the 1990s, with the most recent league title coming in 2005.

During the 2008–2009 baseball season, in only their fifth year of existence, the Overton Mustang baseball team reached the state tournament in Round Rock before losing to the eventual state champion. The Mustang baseball team has continued this success into the 2009–2010 season, beginning the year ranked #1 in the state in Class 1A en route to a 30–3 regular season record, a first district championship, and a second consecutive appearance in the state semifinals.

=== State Titles ===
- Boys Golf
  - 1966(B)

==== State Finalists ====
- Baseball
  - 2025(2A/D2)
