= Overton Independent School District =

School district in Texas

Address
- 501 E Henderson Street Overton, Texas, 75684; United States

District information
- Type: Public
- Established: 1932; 94 years ago

Students and staff
- Enrollment: 152 (2013)
- Athletic conference: UIL Class 2A
- District mascot: Mustangs
- Colors: Kelly Green, White

Other information
- Website: www.overtonisd.org

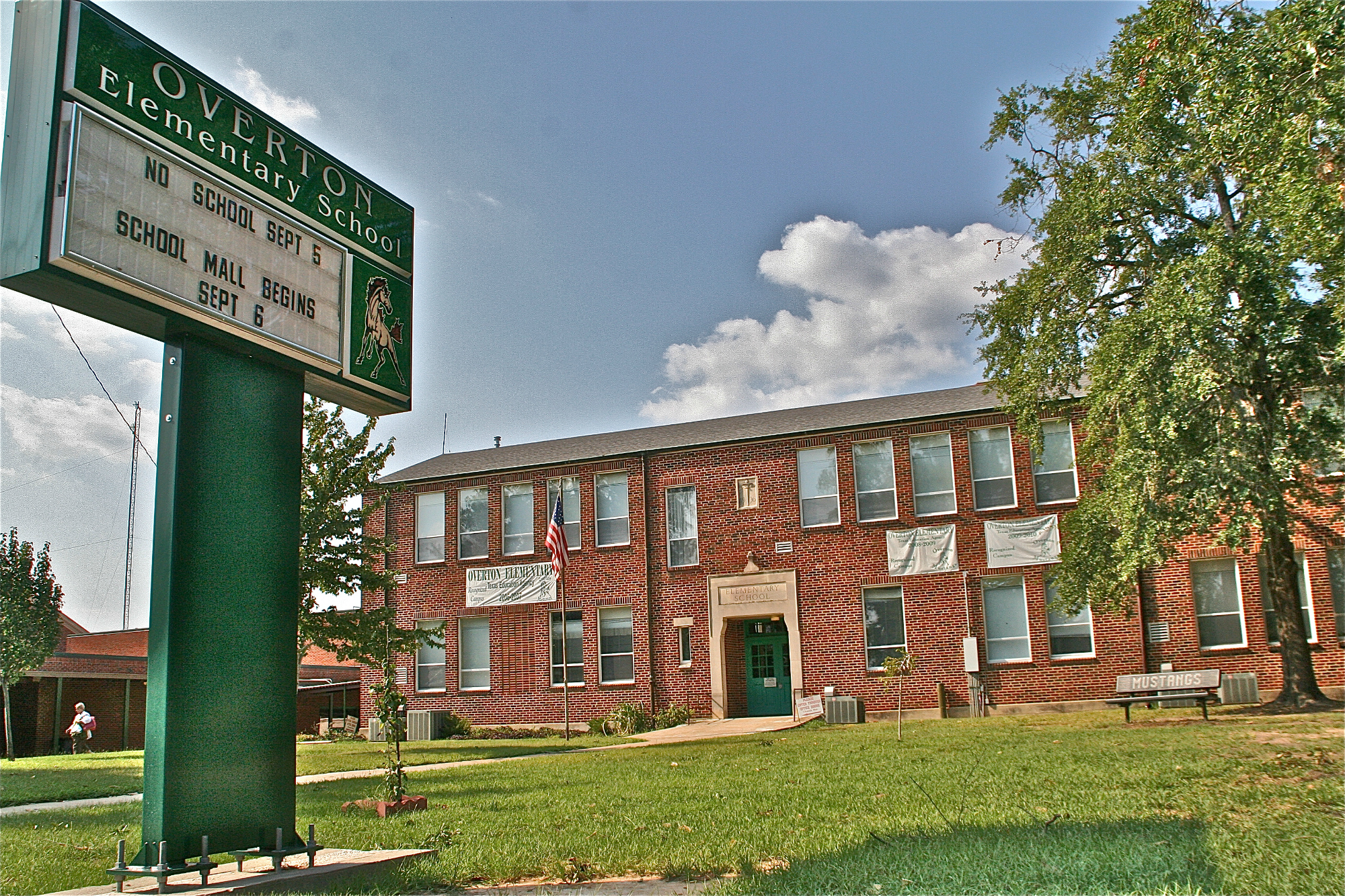
Overton Elementary School, Overton, Texas.

Overton Independent School District is a public school district based in Overton, Texas (USA). In addition to the immediate Overton vicinity, the district serves rural areas in eastern Smith and western Rusk counties. There are three campuses in Overton ISD -

- Overton High School (Grades 9–12)
- Overton Middle School (Grades 6–8)
- Overton Elementary School (Grades PreK–5).

Most of Overton is in the district, and a small portion of New London is in the district.

Overton's athletic mascot are Mustangs, so named for the wild horses which formerly occupied much of the area before it was first settled in 1869. Classified by the University Interscholastic League (for academic and athletic competition) as a 2A school, as of 2014 the Overton Mustangs participate in Division II, District 11 against Fruitvale, Maud, Mount Enterprise, Tenaha and Timpson.

In 2013 Overton High School received secondary Gold Performance acknowledgments for College-Ready Graduates, and was commended in English and Social Studies. Overton Elementary also received Gold Performance acknowledgments and was commended in Math and Science, receiving comparable improvement recognition in reading. The elementary school district was rated "recognized" by the Texas Education Agency. Achieving a recognized rating requires meeting a standard of 80 percent or higher on the TAKS tests for each subject and student group.

== Athletics ==
The Mustang football team competes in Coach Chester Roy Stadium, named in honor of the first African-American member of the faculty following Desegregation. Coach Roy's tenure spanned more than thirty years as a coach and educator, before his passing in 2005 and.

Overton's football program is notable for having won at least one district championship in every single decade starting in the 1930s, including a string of state playoff appearances from the 1980s through the 1990s, with the most recent league title coming in 2012.

During the 2008–2009 baseball season, in only their fifth year of existence, the Overton Mustang baseball team reached the state tournament in Round Rock before losing to the eventual state champion. The Mustang baseball team has continued this success into the 2009–2010 season, beginning the year ranked #1 in the state in Class 1A en route to a 30–3 regular season record, a first district championship, and a second consecutive appearance in the state semifinals. The Mustangs have returned to the post-season each year since, advancing to bi-district in 2013.

== Academics ==
Overton's academic and fine arts programs are notable as well, with the marching band winning numerous state marching competitions throughout its history and the Theatre department making a string of State UIL One Act Play appearances, with a 20-year streak of district championships led by longtime Drama instructor Lillian Cohagen, who retired in 1980. In 1997 OHS won a state Class 1A One Act Play championship with Confederate Letters, written and directed by Barre Gonzalez.

A number of OHS graduates have attended prestigious schools of higher learning. In recent years graduates received scholarships to colleges as prestigious as in-state schools Baylor, TCU, Texas A&M and Texas to such nationally recognized institutions as Vassar College and Stanford.
