= Texas Code of Criminal Procedure =

Act of the Texas State Legislature

The Code of Criminal Procedure, sometimes called the Code of Criminal Procedure of 1965 or the Code of Criminal Procedure, 1965, is an Act of the Texas State Legislature. The Act is a code of the law of criminal procedure of Texas.

The code regulates how criminal trials are carried out in Texas. The code governs important legal processes and constitutional rights and liberties. These include but are not limited to court jurisdictions, protective orders, Habeas Corpus, bail, warrants, legal expenses, and the rights of those affected by criminal actions.

For the purpose of citation, Texas Code of Criminal Procedure or Texas Criminal Procedure Code may be abbreviated to Tex Crim Proc or Tex Crim Pro or Tx Crim Proc or Tx Crim Pro or Tx Code Crim Proc or Tx Code Crim Pro or Tex Code Crim Proc or Tex Code Crim Pro or Code Crim Proc Tex or Code Crim Pro Tex.

== History ==
In the early to mid 20th century, there were numerous efforts to revise the Code of Criminal Procedure by the Texas State Bar and the Supreme Court of Texas that never made it through the state legislature. However, in 1958, the revision of the code was undertaken by a 23-person committee formed of the Texas State Bar with a tripartite goal to remove technicalities and loopholes by which a party can exploit the law, reform the appeal system, and "strike the delicate balance" of protecting the people of Texas from crime while also preventing others from being wrongfully incarcerated. The code was also substantially edited to provide better clarity and more logical organization.

This committee's initial revision was submitted to the rest of the Bar Association in April 1962 and to the state legislature shortly thereafter, being well supported by both bodies and passing with large margins. However, as a result of technicalities and small issues, Texas governor John Connally vetoed the bill containing the revisions, sending the revisal committee back to fix these issues, which they did.

The current Code of Criminal Procedure was enacted in 1965 by Texas Senate Bill 107, 59 R.S. and has been added to and edited since in the 21st century, though not to the same degree.

This code is sometimes called the "new code" as it replaces the previous criminal procedure code. The Code of Criminal Procedure of 1856 was the first criminal procedure code to be enacted in Texas. It was followed by the Code of Criminal Procedure of 1879, the Code of Criminal Procedure of 1895, the Code of Criminal Procedure of 1911, and the Code of Criminal Procedure of 1925.

== Organization ==
The Texas Code of Criminal Procedure is organized into two Titles, with Title One containing the vast number of statutes and Title Two largely encompassing court expenses and legal fees. The below links are the chapters published on the Texas Legislature website as of 2021.

1. Title 1: Code of Criminal Procedure
  1. Chapter 1: General Provisions
  2. Chapter 2: General Duties of Officers
  3. Chapter 3: Definitions
  4. Chapter 4: Courts and Criminal Jurisdiction
  5. Chapter 5: Family Violence Prevention
  6. Chapter 6: Preventing Offenses by the Act of Magistrates and Other Officers; Education Concerning Consequences of Certain Offenses
  7. Chapter 7: Proceeds Before Magistrates to Prevent Offense
    1. Chapter 7B: Protective Orders
  8. Chapter 8: Suppression of Riots and Other Disturbances
  9. Chapter 9: Offenses Injurious to Public Health
  10. Chapter 10: (No Chapter 10)
  11. Chapter 11: Habeas Corpus
  12. Chapter 12: Limitation
  13. Chapter 13: Venue
  14. Chapter 14: Arrest Without Warrant
  15. Chapter 15: Arrest Under Warrant
  16. Chapter 16: The Commitment or Discharge of the Accused
  17. Chapter 17: Bail
    1. Chapter 17A: Corporations and Associations
  18. Chapter 18: Search Warrants
    1. Chapter 18A: Detection, Interception, and Use of Wire, Oral, and Electronic Communications
    2. Chapter 18B: Installation and Use of Tracking Equipment; Access to Communications
  19. Chapter 19A: Grand Jury Organization
  20. Chapter 20A: Grand Jury Proceedings
  21. Chapter 21: Indictment and Information
  22. Chapter 22: Forfeiture of Bail
  23. Chapter 23: The Capias
  24. Chapter 24: Subpoenas and Attachment
    1. Chapter 24A: Responding to Subpoenas and Certain Other Court Orders; Preserving Certain Information
  25. Chapter 25: Service of a Copy of an Indictment
  26. Chapter 26: Arraignment
  27. Chapter 27: The Pleading in Criminal Actions
  28. Chapter 28: Motions, Pleadings, and Exceptions
  29. Chapter 29: Continuance
  30. Chapter 30: Disqualification of the Judge
  31. Chapter 31: Change of Venue
  32. Chapter 32: Dismissing Prosecutions
    1. Chapter 32A: Speedy Trial
  33. Chapter 33: The Mode of Trial
  34. Chapter 34: Special Venire in Capital Cases
  35. Chapter 35: Formation of the Jury
  36. Chapter 36: Trial Before the Jury
  37. Chapter 37: The Verdict
  38. Chapter 38: Evidence in Criminal Actions
  39. Chapter 39: Depositions in Discovery
  40. Chapter 40: New Trials
  41. (No Chapter 41)
  42. Chapter 42: Judgement and Sentence
    1. Chapter 42A: Community Supervision
  43. Chapter 43: Execution of Judgement
  44. Chapter 44: Appeal and Writ of Error
  45. Chapter 45: Justice and Municipal Courts
  46. Chapter 46: Miscellaneous Provisions Relating to Mental Illness and Intellectual Disability
    1. Chapter 46B: Incompetency to Stand Trial
    2. Chapter 46C: Insanity Defense
  47. Chapter 47: Disposition of Stolen Property
  48. Chapter 48: Pardon and Parole
  49. Chapter 49: Inquests Upon Dead Bodies
  50. Chapter 50: Fire Inquests
  51. Chapter 51: Fugitives from Justice
  52. Chapter 52: Court of Inquiry
  53. (No Chapter 53)
  54. (No Chapter 54)
  55. Chapter 55: Expunction of Criminal Records
  56. Chapter 56A: Rights of Crime Victims
    1. Chapter 56B: Crime Victims' Compensation
  57. (No Chapter 57)
  58. Chapter 58: Confidentiality of Identifying Information and Medical Records of Certain Crime Victims
  59. Chapter 59: Forfeiture of Contraband
  60. (No Chapter 60)
  61. (No Chapter 61)
  62. Chapter 62: Sex Offender Registration Program
  63. Chapter 63: Missing Children and Missing Persons
  64. Chapter 64: Motion for Forensic DNA Testing
  65. (No Chapter 65)
  66. Chapter 66: Criminal History Record System
  67. Chapter 67: Compilation of Information Pertaining to Combinations and Criminal Street Gangs
2. Title 2: Code of Criminal Procedure (Costs, Fees, Expenses)
  1. Chapter 101: General Provisions
  2. Chapter 102: Costs, Fines, and Fees Paid by Defendants
  3. Chapter 103: Payment, Collection, and Record keeping
  4. Chapter 104: Certain Expenses Paid by State or County

== Particular statutes ==
Chapter 5, Articles 5.04 and 5.05 detail the duties of peace officers when responding to family violence calls. These include protecting the victim, helping the victim move to a safer place, and providing victims with written instructions about the legal actions they can take to protect themselves from the offender.

Chapter 5, Article 5.08 stipulates that magistrates cannot seek mediation as a valid means of resolving family violence, meaning these cases must remain in the criminal court system after they are reported.

Chapter 7B, Article 7B.003 outlines the requirements for a protective order to be granted to an applicant using the subjective terminology "reasonable grounds to believe." This leaves much of the decision to grant up to the magistrate and places a large burden of proof into applicants.

Chapter 11, Article 11.051 prohibits a fee being attached to an application for a Writ of Habeas Corpus, which would aid someone who might be detained without probable cause.

Chapter 12, Article 12.01, Section 1 states that the statute of limitations for a sexual assault does not expire if there is "biological material" collected and it is not easily identifiable whose it is, or if the offender may have committed similar acts five or more times. Otherwise, according to Section 2, the statute of limitations is 10 years, with exceptions for minors that often coincide with the victim's 18th birthday.

Chapter 17, Article 17.028 stipulates that it must take no more than 48 hours after the arrest for a magistrate to decide whether or not a defendant is offered bail, conditional or unconditional.

Chapter 27, Articles 27.02 and 27.05 encompass pleas that defendants can make. Contrary to popular belief, there are pleas that can be made outside of the "guilty" or "not guilty" binary. One such plea essentially claims double jeopardy while another plea places the punishment if found guilty into the hands of the jury rather than the magistrate. A plea of "nolo contendere" is, according to Texas, essentially a "guilty" plea, except the plea cannot be used in a civil case that may follow a criminal one to prove guilt.

Chapter 32A, Article 32A.01 describes the priorities of the courts. According to this statute, criminal cases are given priority over civil ones and criminal cases where the defendant is being held in jail are given priority over those that aren't. Section C states that if a victim in a case is younger than 14, their case is given priority over all others, even if it is civil in nature.

Chapter 46B, Article 46B.003 stipulates incompetency to stand trial. Under Texas law, a defendant is deemed competent for trial unless it can be proven otherwise. This criterion centers on the defendant's capability to consult their legal team and understand the charges against them. According to Article 46B.004, a motion can be filed by either the prosecution or defense that seeks to deem the defendant incompetent and if it passes, according to Section D, all court proceedings are paused.

Chapter 56A, Article 56A.052 stipulates extra rights for victims of sexual crimes such as access to evidence, lab sample analyses, and counseling if the victim has been infected with HIV or developed AIDS as a result of the crime. Subsection 4, Paragraph A also establishes that sex crime victims have a right to be tested for these diseases.

Chapter 58, Article 58.052 establishes an address confidentiality program, which keeps applicants' address hidden in cases where further violence against the victim or those related to them is possible. Article 58.055 details the necessary parts of the application, which includes sworn statements about possible danger.

Chapter 58, Article 58.102 states that a victim in a sexual crime case can choose to be referred to by a pseudonym if a form is completed. Section B stipulates that all law enforcement agencies in the state must have these forms available for anyone wishing to use them. All information within these forms, and the form itself, is kept strictly confidential.

Chapter 64, Article 64.01 stipulates the conditions necessary for a convicted person to ask for DNA testing to be done on evidence that might exonerate the person. First off, the evidence must be likely to contain DNA. Second, the motion must be filed with a sworn statement from the defendant. Third, the evidence must have been used in the conviction and be in the court's possession. Fourth, was not already tested or could be tested with better testing technology.

== Terminology ==
Below is a list of some of the legal terms that appear within the Code of Criminal Procedure.

1. Magistrate is defined by Article 2.09 of the Code.
2. Peace officer is defined by Article 2.12 of the Code.
3. Witnesses are persons who give written or oral testimony at a court hearing.
4. Defendants are persons who are accused of committing a crime.
5. Prosecutors are the lawyers who are seeking to prove the charges against the defendant.
6. Petit Juries are the unassociated, impartial group of six to twelve civilians who adjudicate evidence and pass verdicts.
7. Grand Juries are the unassociated, impartial group of more than 12 citizens who decide whether a prosecutor has probable cause to continue a case.
8. Indictment is defined by Article 21.01 of the Code.
9. Depositions are statements made under oath during a trial in which facts or information are shared.
10. Warrants are court issued documents giving legal authority to officers in order to conduct searches or arrests.
11. Pleas are a statements issued by the defendant and their legal team of either "guilty" or "not guilty." "Guilty" pleas can be used to achieve less harsh sentencing or avoid a lengthy trial while "not guilty" pleas often result in the trial's inception.
12. Pleadings, not to be confused with pleas, are statements submitted to the court by the prosecution or defendant that seek to establish facts relevant to the case

== See also ==
- Law of Texas
- Texas Penal Code
