= Alcohol laws of Texas =

A person must be 21 years of age to publicly drink an alcoholic beverage in Texas, with some exceptions.

Texas law says that adults can get in serious trouble if they give alcohol to minors. According to the law, a person commits an offense if they buy alcohol for a minor, give it to them, or even make it available to them. If any adult who is not the minor's parent/guardian breaks this rule, they can be charged with a Class A misdemeanor, which can lead to issues like being fined or going to jail.

However, whether giving alcohol is allowed depends on who it is given to and who is involved. Texas is one of ten states (California, Colorado, Maryland, Montana, New York, Texas, West Virginia, Washington, Wisconsin, and Wyoming) that allow consumption by minors in the presence of consenting and supervising family members. In the state of Texas, parents accept responsibility for the safety of minors under 15 when the minor is on their property or property leased by them and under their care, custody, and control; an adult may provide alcohol to a minor if they are the minor's adult parent, guardian, or spouse, and are visibly present when the minor possesses or consumes the alcoholic beverage. It is against the law to make alcohol available to a non-family person younger than 17, even on one's own property and even with permission from a parent of that person.

Texas holds parents/adults civilly liable for damages caused by the intoxication of a minor younger than 17 if they knowingly provided alcohol or allowed alcohol to be served on property owned or leased by them if the minor:

- is injured or dies as a result of drinking on the property;
- becomes involved in a fight, falls and hurts themselves, or is sexually assaulted;
- damages someone else's property; or
- leaves the property and is involved in a motor vehicle accident causing injury to themselves or others.

An operator of a motor vehicle is considered automatically under the influence of alcohol if a chemical screening shows a blood-alcohol content (BAC) of 0.08 percent or greater. If under the age of 17, a driver in Texas testing positive for any BAC may be subject to DUI charges.

== Alcohol sales ==
Voter approval is required (at the appropriate county-wide, precinct-wide, or city-wide region) to approve such sales. Separate votes are required for 1) "on-premise" (sales at a restaurant or bar for consumption at that location) beer and wine sales, 2) "off-premise" (sales for consumption elsewhere, such as at home) beer and wine sales, 3) on-premise liquor sales, and 4) off-premise liquor sales.

Only four Texas counties are completely "dry" counties, where sales of alcoholic beverages are not legal anywhere in the county:

1. Borden
2. Kent
3. Roberts
4. Throckmorton

Many counties are completely "wet" counties, where all alcoholic beverage sales are legal everywhere in the county:

1. Aransas
2. Austin
3. Bexar
4. Brazos
5. Brewster
6. Brooks
7. Burnet
8. Cameron
9. Childress
10. Clay
11. Collingsworth
12. Colorado
13. Comal
14. Cottle
15. Crosby
16. Culberson
17. Dimmit
18. Donley
19. Duval
20. Ector
21. El Paso
22. Fayette
23. Fisher
24. Fort Bend
25. Goliad
26. Gonzales
27. Guadalupe
28. Hidalgo
29. Hudspeth
30. Jim Hogg
31. Kendall
32. Kenedy
33. Kinney
34. Kleberg
35. La Salle
36. Midland
37. Mitchell
38. Nolan
39. Nueces
40. Ochiltree
41. Presidio
42. San Saba
43. Scurry
44. Sherman
45. Starr
46. Sutton
47. Val Verde
48. Victoria
49. Waller
50. Washington
51. Webb
52. Wharton
53. Wilbarger
54. Zapata
55. Zavala

The 195 other Texas counties are "moist" counties, which are a combination of wet and dry areas.

=== Sales of alcohol ===
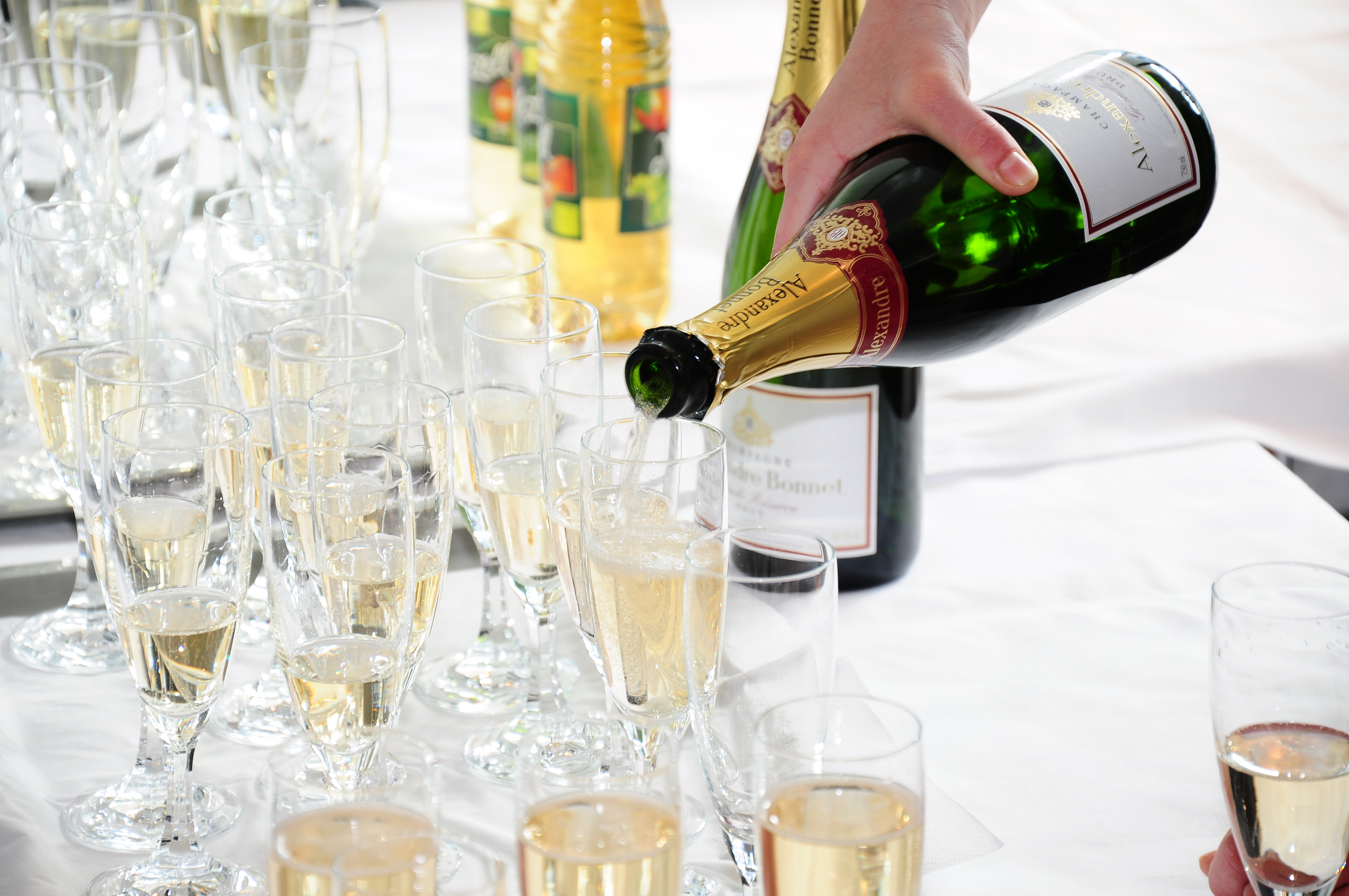
Sunday at 10 a.m. in Texas where alcohol can only be served with food.

Beer and wine can be sold from 7:00 AM until midnight Monday through Friday, from 7:00 AM until 1:00 AM on Saturday, and from 10 AM until midnight on Sunday. Licensed restaurants, bars, and other establishments additionally can serve for consumption on-premises starting at 10:00 AM on Sunday if served with food, and until 2:00 AM every night if the establishment has a late-hours permit in cities or counties that allow such sales. In addition to these rules, Texas has added a newer policy that makes alcohol sales more convenient. Texas has created a “to-go” alcohol law that allows adults to take sealed alcoholic drinks out of the restaurant with a purchase of food.

Liquor sales are more stringently regulated. They are prohibited 1) on Sundays, 2) on Thanksgiving Day, Christmas Day and New Year's Day (and when Christmas and New Year's Days are on a Sunday, the prohibition is carried over to the following Monday), and 3) before 10AM and after 9PM on any other day. Furthermore, liquor can only be sold in "package stores", which must be closed (even for sales of otherwise allowable products) whenever liquor sales are prohibited, and which further must be physically separated from any other business. Moreover, no owner can own more than 250 package stores, and no publicly traded company can own such a store.

Hotel bars can serve alcohol to registered guests at all hours.

In Texas, any individual who hopes to sell, serve, or distribute alcohol must have a valid permit or license from the Texas Alcoholic Beverage Commission. It is illegal for any restaurant, bar, or store to sell alcohol without a valid permit. Also, employees must be trained to follow regulations such as checking identification and not serving to minors.

== Legitimate age ==
People must be at least 21 years of age to legally consume alcoholic beverages in Texas with certain exceptions, as in all other states. However, employment at a company serving alcoholic beverages can be entered at the age of 18 provided they get certified by the Texas Alcoholic Beverage Commission.

No specific training is required to serve alcohol; however, the Texas Alcoholic Beverage Code states that the actions (such as serving alcohol to a clearly intoxicated patron) of an employee will not be imputed to the employer if 1) the employer requires the employee to complete training approved by the Texas Alcoholic Beverage Commission, 2) the employee actually completes the training, and 3) the employer has not directly encouraged the employee to violate the law.

== Open container laws ==
All previously opened containers of alcoholic beverages must be stored and transported in a vehicle's trunk (or behind the last row of seats if a vehicle does not have a partitioned trunk) or other storage to which the driver and/or any passengers do not have access.

== Blood alcohol content limits ==
An operator of a motor vehicle is considered under the influence of alcohol if a chemical screening test shows a blood-alcohol content (BAC) of 0.08 percent or higher. No other evidence (such as Field Sobriety tests) needs to be presented to the court to obtain a DUI ( driving under the influence) conviction. A driver testing 0.15 percent or higher above the legal limit of 0.08 percent faces more severe penalties for enhanced BAC. When under the age of 21, a driver in Texas must not test positive for any BAC and may be charged with DUI even if the amount tested is under 0.08 percent. Individuals can also receive an offense of driver while intoxicated, DWI, which is one of the major drinking -related offenses in Texas. DWI's can lead to several consequences even on the first offense, including fines, jail time, license suspension, alcohol classes, and prohibition. In addition, the Zero Tolerance Law states that driver's under 21 cannot have any detectable amount of alcohol in their system and they could be charged even if their BAC is below 0.08%.

== See also ==
- Law of Texas
