= Texas Administrative Code =

The Texas Administrative Code is a subject-based compilation of all rules and regulations promulgated by Texas state agencies. The Code was originally created by legislation in 1977 with the passage of Administrative Code Act. In 1995, H.B. 2304 was enacted, which required that the Secretary of State make the Administrative Code available online free of charge. As of 2020, there are 17 titles in the Code, listed below.

1. Title 1: Administration
2. Title 4: Agriculture
3. Title 7: Banking and Securities
4. Title 10: Community Development
5. Title 13: Cultural Resources
6. Title 16: Economic Regulation
7. Title 19: Education
8. Title 22: Examining Boards
9. Title 25: Health Services
10. Title 26: Health and Human Services
11. Title 28: Insurance
12. Title 30: Environmental Quality
13. Title 31: Natural Resources and Conservation
14. Title 34: Public Finance
15. Title 37: Public Safety and Corrections
16. Title 40: Social Services and Assistance
17. Title 43: Transportation
