= Texas Nationalist Movement =

Organization which promotes an independent nation of Texas

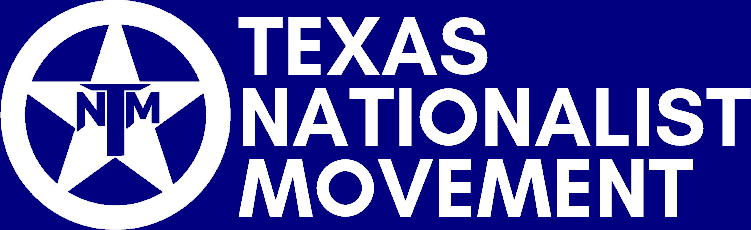
- Abbreviation: TNM
- President: Daniel Miller
- Founded: June 1, 2005
- Split from: Republic of Texas (Lowe-Miller faction)
- Headquarters: Nederland, Texas
- Newspaper: The Texian Partisan
- Ideology: Texas nationalism Right-wing populism
- Political position: Right-wing to far-right
- Slogan: "TEXIT Now!"

Website
- thetnm.org

The Texas Nationalist Movement (TNM) is a political organization that advocates for the independence of Texas from the United States, founded in 2005 as a splinter organization from a faction of the Republic of Texas group led by Daniel Miller. The organization is non-violent in nature. It claims to be the single largest sovereignty advocacy group in Texas, purporting over 633,098 supporters. The organization is part of the broader Texan secession and independence movement.

== Ideology ==
The TNM espouses Texas nationalism, aiming to establish Texas as a self-governing, independent nation. Its ideological foundation is outlined in the book Texit: Why and How Texas Will Leave the Union, authored by TNM President Daniel Miller.

According to its website, the objective of the Texas Nationalist Movement is "the complete, total and unencumbered political, cultural and economic independence of Texas". Unlike its predecessor, TNM claims to work peaceably with the current political system, and to reject use of force to achieve its goals. TNM is an unincorporated association under the laws of the State of Texas. The organization focuses on political support and advocacy, and education surrounding the issue of secession. It seeks to have the Texas Legislature call for a state-wide referendum on the issue, similar to the Scottish Independence vote of 2014.

=== International relations ===
The TNM has shown support for independence movements abroad such as in Alberta, Alaska, Northern Mexico, California, New Hampshire and Louisiana. In 2024, the TNM declared its support for secessionist groups in Northern Mexico.

In 2015, a representative from the Texas Nationalist Movement attended a separatist conference in Russia. Public records show that the conference was almost entirely paid for by the Kremlin's "National Charitable Foundation". During Russia's 2016 interference operations in the U.S., a fake Russian Facebook page, dubbed "Heart of Texas," claimed it was passing information about supporters along to the Texas Nationalist Movement.

== History ==
The modern Texas independence movement has roots in the Republic of Texas organization, which emerged in the 1990s. In 1996, the movement split into three factions: one led by Richard McLaren, another by David Johnson and Jesse Enloe, and a third by Archie Lowe and Daniel Miller (which would later become the TNM.)

In 1997, McLaren’s faction made national headlines after kidnapping Joe and Margaret Ann Rowe at the Davis Mountain Resort and demanding the release of a jailed movement member in exchange. After a week-long standoff with law enforcement, McLaren surrendered peacefully, persuaded by his wife Evelyn. This effectively destroyed the McLaren faction, and the Johnson-Enloe faction was discredited after two of its members, Jack Abbot Grebe Jr. and Johnnie Wise, were convicted in 1998 of threatening to assassinate several government officials, including President Bill Clinton. The two men were each sentenced to 24 years in prison.

In 2003, what remained of the organized movement consolidated into one dominant group recognizing an "interim" government (which replaced the "provisional" government), headed by Daniel Miller. This interim government claimed authority from the original proclamations of 1995 and set up a headquarters in the town of Overton, Texas. The Republic of Texas headquarters in Overton burned down on August 31, 2005; one person was moderately injured.

After the burning of the headquarters in Overton, the Texas Nationalist Movement (TNM) was formally established in 2005.

In January 2013, members of the TNM rallied at the state capital in Austin to promote the resolution, resulting in one mention of secession by one lawmaker on the opening day of the legislative session. In May 2016, the Texas GOP narrowly rejected bringing a resolution for secession to a floor vote at the 2016 Texas Republican Convention.

In 2015, a representative from the Texas Nationalist Movement attended a separatist conference in Russia. Public record show that the conference was almost entirely paid for by the Kremlin's "National Charitable Foundation".

During Russia's 2016 interference operations in the U.S., a fake Russian Facebook page, dubbed "Heart of Texas," claimed it was passing information about supporters along to the Texas Nationalist Movement.

In 2020, the Republican Party of Texas included a plank in its party platform (with 93% approval) stating that the federal government has impaired Texas' right to self-government, that any legislation infringing upon the Tenth Amendment to the United States Constitution "should be ignored, opposed, refused, and nullified", and that Texas retains the right to secede if any future Congress or President change the current political system from a constitutional republic to something else.

In 2021, then State Representative Kyle Biedermann filed the Texas Independence Referendum Act (TIRA), which sought to give Texans the opportunity to vote on whether the state should begin the process of reasserting its independence. The bill was heavily backed by the Texas Nationalist Movement (TNM) and its president, Daniel Miller. As of 2024, the TNM lists Kyle Biedermann as its Legislative Advisor to the TNM’s Advisory Board.

In June 2022, it voted to include a further secessionist plank in its party platform, calling for the Texas Legislature to approve a referendum on whether Texas should secede from the Union on the 2023 statewide ballot.

Another version of the Texas Independence Referendum Act was introduced by state representative Bryan Slaton on March 6, 2023.

In 2024, the TNM declared its support for secessionist groups in Northern Mexico. In 2024, Miller submitted over 140,000 signatures from petitions signed in support of secession. Miller said of the rising support for secession:

If you look at where support is for this issue right now, in this lifecycle of an independence movement, we're outperforming Brexit, we're outperforming Scottish independence and we're outperforming Catalan — and we're outperforming everyone at every stage of the process.

In 2024, it made a PAC called the Texas Nationalist Movement-Political Action Committee.

In November 2024, the Texas Nationalist Movement announced that 10 candidates who support its secessionist goals were elected to the Texas Legislature. TNM president Daniel Miller described the outcome as a "clear signal that Texans are ready to reclaim their right to self-government." The organization reported that 65 current Texas officeholders had signed the "Texas First Pledge," a commitment to principles such as upholding Texans’ right to alter their government, supporting independence legislation, and honoring the outcome of any referendum on Texan secession.

On February 4, 2025, the TNM launched its first official county branch in Angelina County. The event, held in Lufkin, marked what the group described as a "major milestone" in grassroots organizing. TNM leader Daniel Miller stated the group is now active or organizing in over 60 of Texas's 254 counties, which together represent approximately 78% of Texas voters.
