= Overton, Texas =

- City
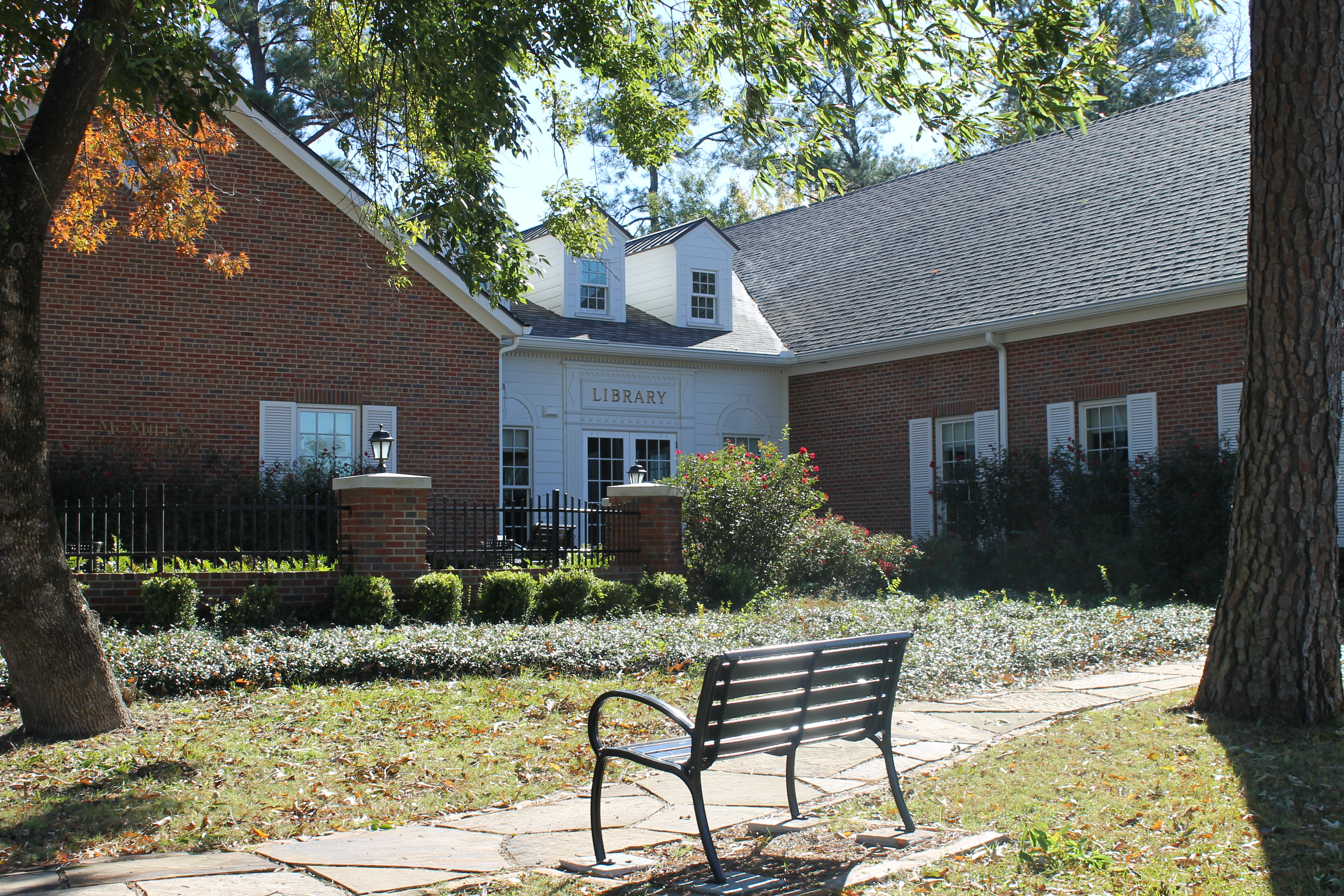
- The McMillan Memorial Library in Overton, Texas
- Motto: "A Growing Community nestled in the Piney Woods of East Texas"
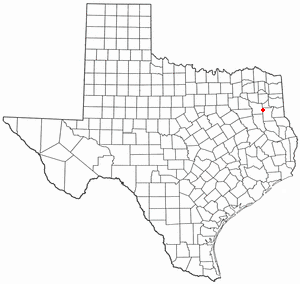
- Location of Overton, Texas
- Coordinates: 32°16′33″N 94°58′21″W
- Country: United States
- State: Texas
- Counties: Rusk, Smith

Area
  - Total: 6.75 sq mi (17.48 km^{2})
  - Land: 6.70 sq mi (17.35 km^{2})
  - Water: 0.050 sq mi (0.13 km^{2})
- Elevation: 492 ft (150 m)

Population (2020)
  - Total: 2,275
  - Density: 373.6/sq mi (144.24/km^{2})
- Time zone: UTC-6 (Central (CST))
  - Summer (DST): UTC-5 (CDT)
- ZIP code: 75684
- Area codes: 903, 430
- FIPS code: 48-54432
- GNIS feature ID: 2411343
- Website: cityofoverton.com

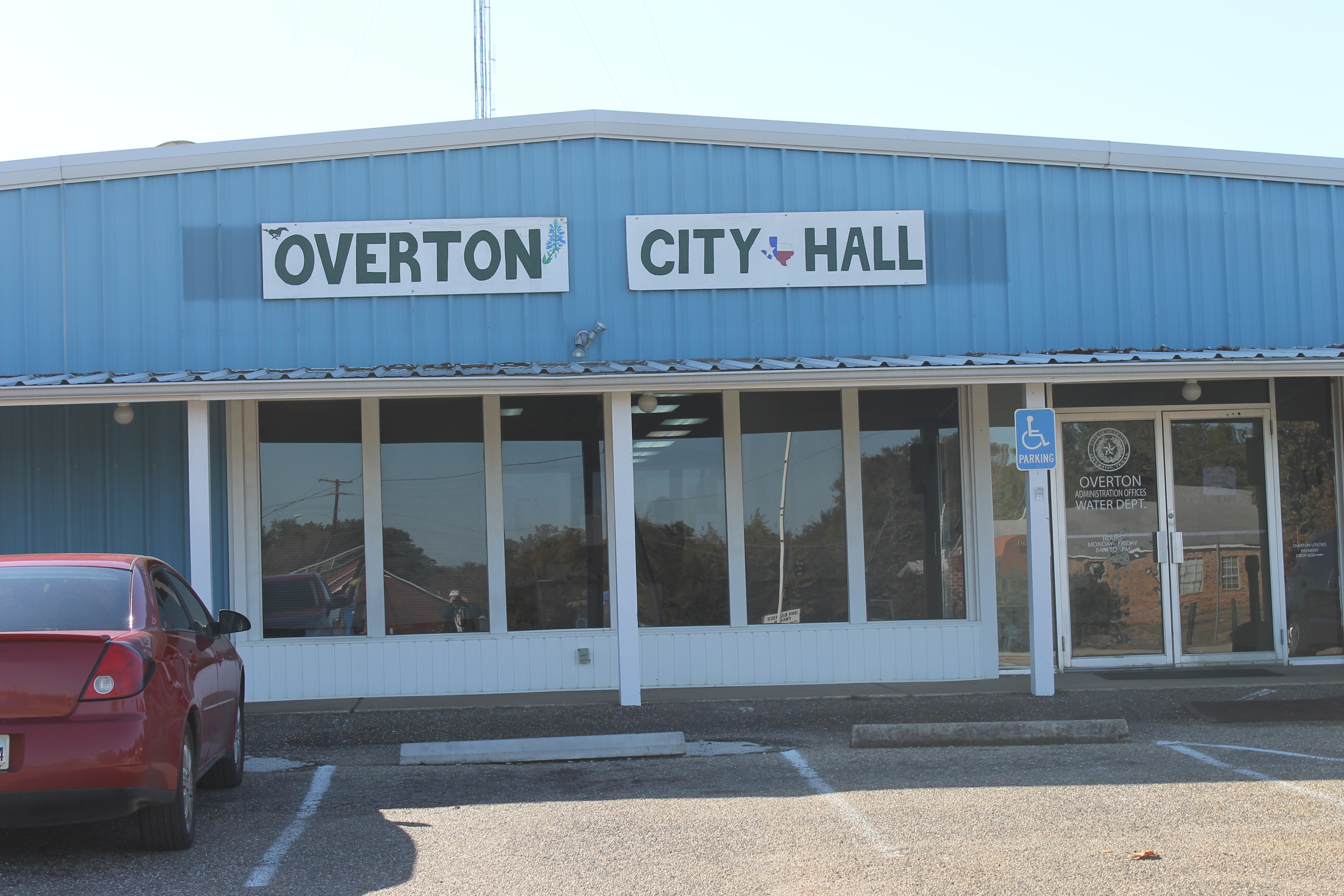
Overton City Hall

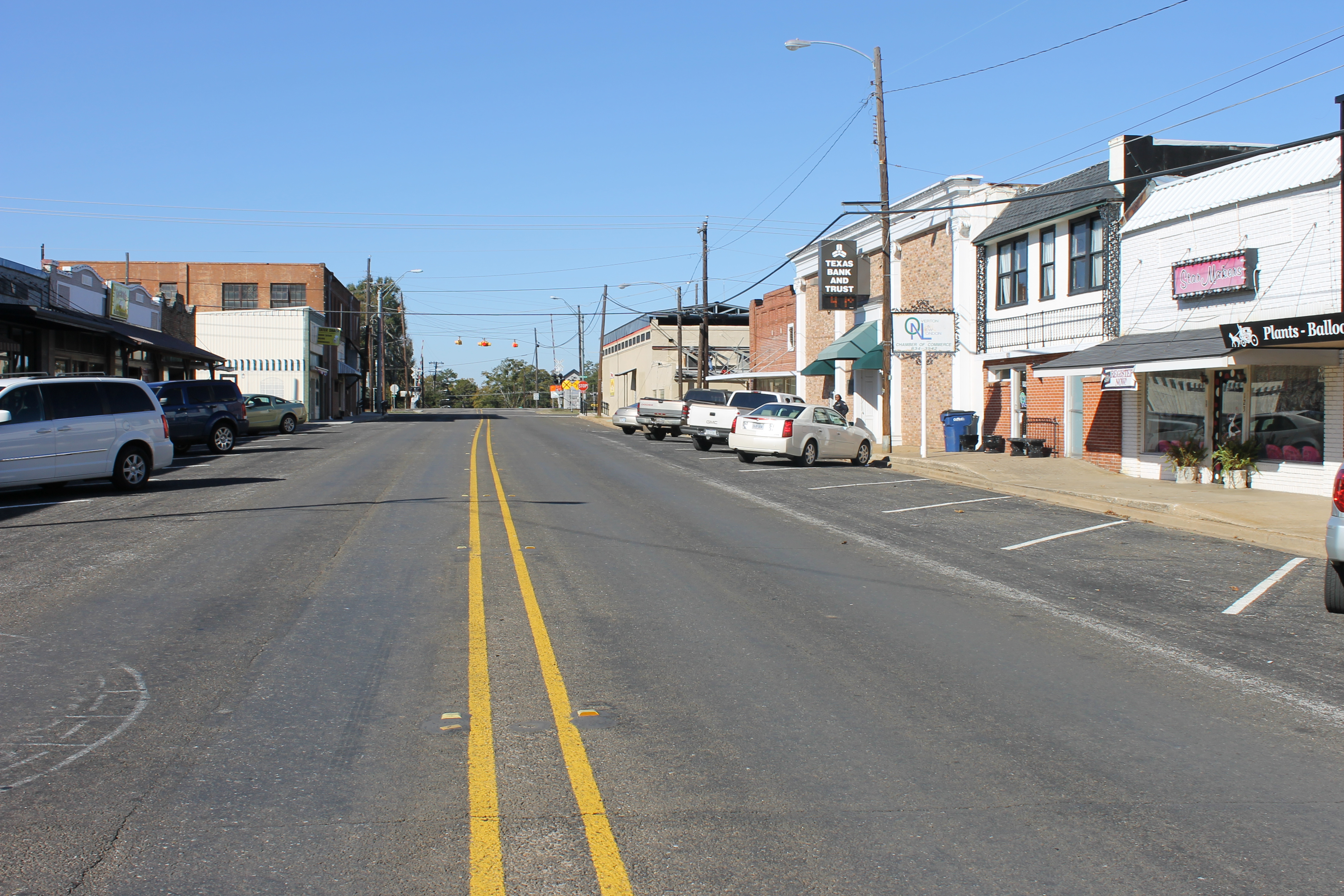
A portion of downtown Overton

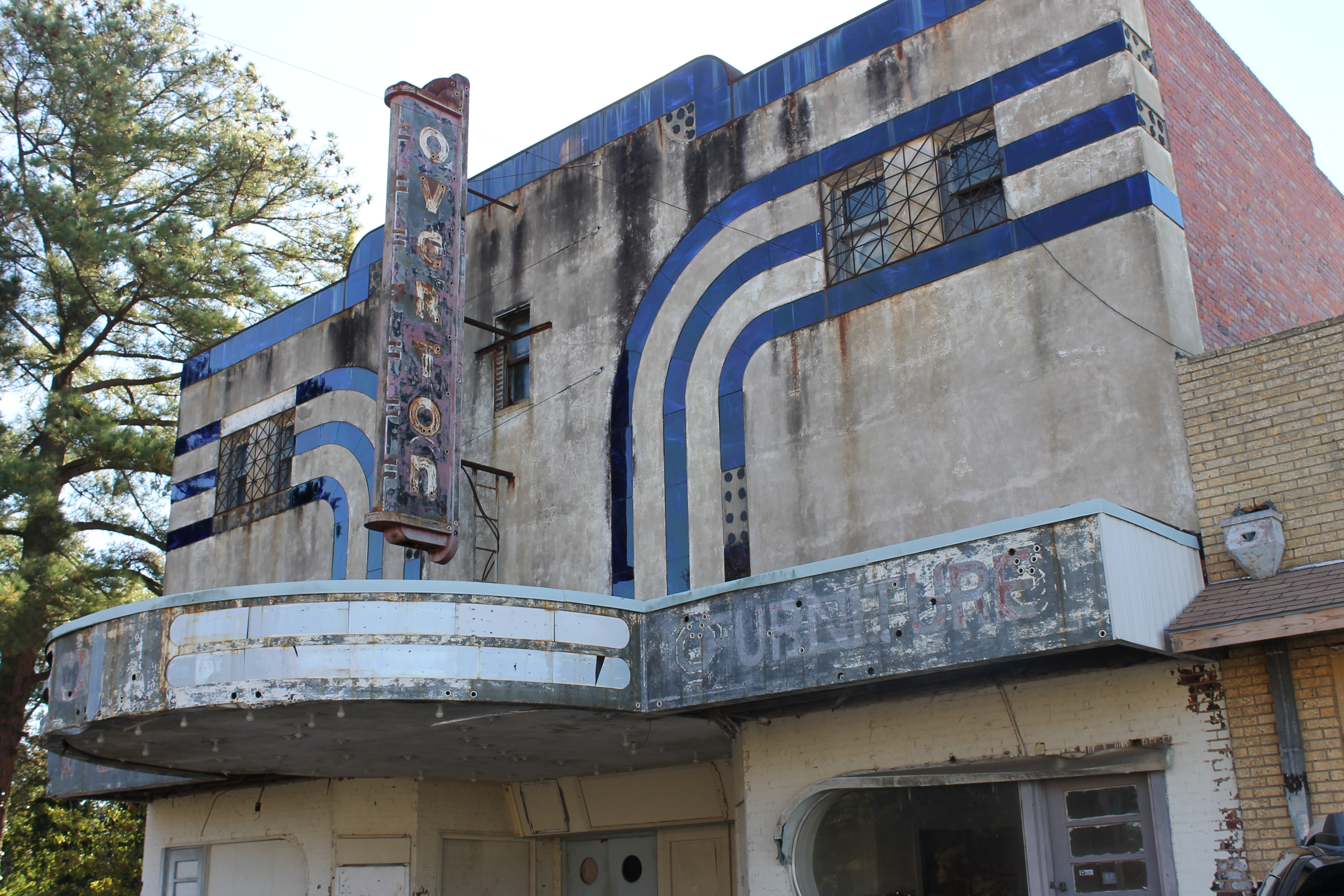
The abandoned Overton Theater

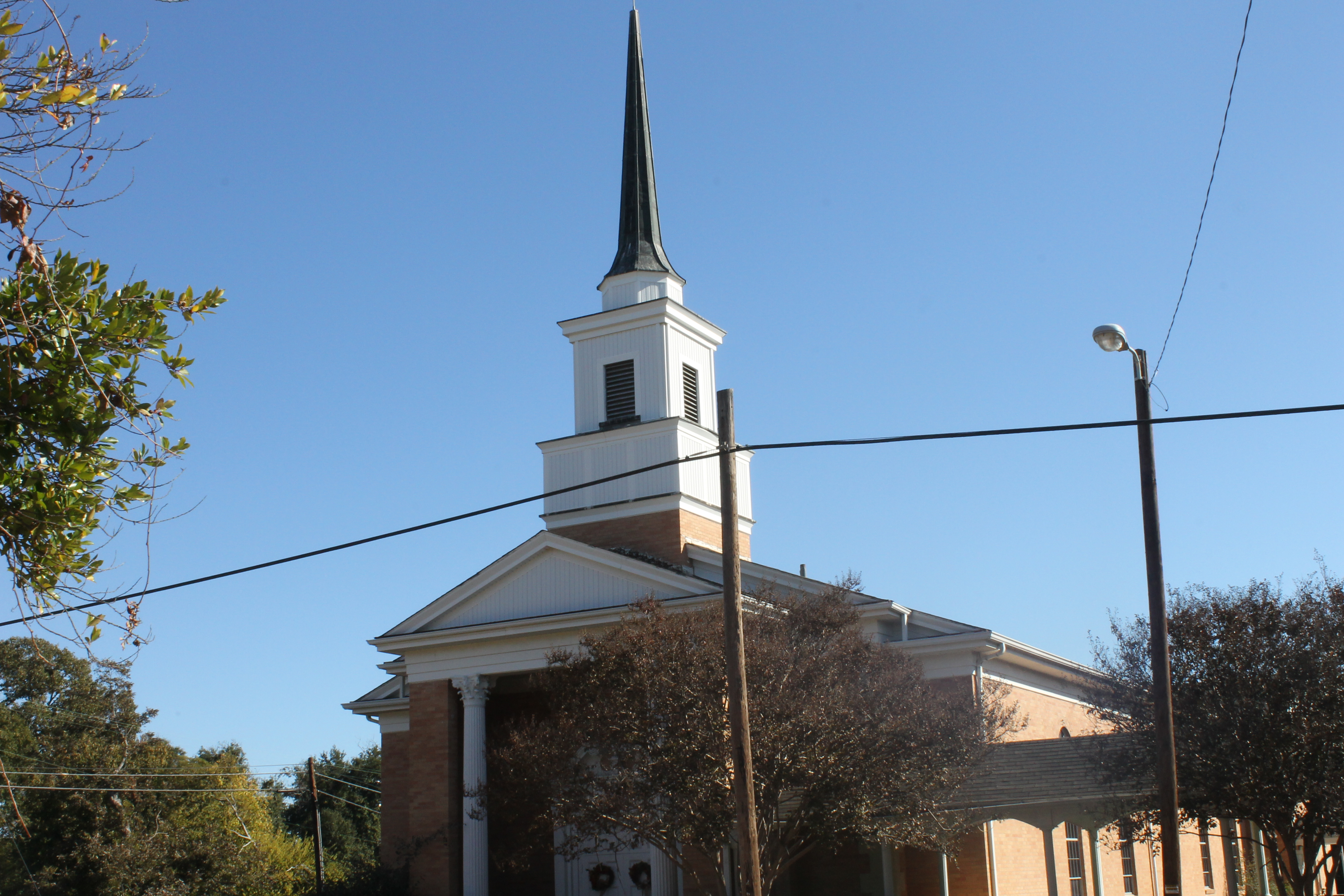
The First Baptist Church of Overton

Overton is a city in Rusk and Smith counties in the U.S. state of Texas. Overton lies in two counties as well as two metropolitan areas. The Rusk County portion of the city is part of the Longview Metropolitan Statistical Area, while the Smith County portion is part of the Tyler Metropolitan Statistical Area.

The population was 2,275 at the 2020 census.

== History ==
It was known to the Choctaws, Chickasaws, and Creeks who lived in the area as Tiyuk Hekia (Standing Pine); many years later, when it was incorporated, it became known as Overton.

The town was named after Major Frank Overton, an early settler and landowner who donated some of his land for the town site. It was platted in 1873 and a post office was granted that year.

Overton was originally intended to be a crossroads for two railroads. In 1875, the Henderson and Overton Branch Railroad, 16 miles (26 km) long, was completed and was later joined by the International-Great Northern. When the nearby communities of Bellview, Jamestown, Rocky Mount, and Salem were all bypassed by the railroad, Overton gained the businesses and people who wanted to benefit from the railroad lines. The town offered lots for businesses to relocate, and many took the offer.

The Masons and Odd Fellows built the first school, and a church was constructed in 1875. By 1888 the population had increased to 500 and had all essential businesses, including a newspaper. Overton prospered as an agricultural community, and in 1904 the population had reached 568.

Oklahoman wildcatter C. M. "Dad" Joiner was drilling his third well in 1930, and the town of Overton helped raise the funds he needed to drill. When the well came in, Overton shared in Joiner's success, as churches, schools, and a refinery were built. Hubbard College was founded during this time as well. The town's once agrarian-based economy suddenly revolved entirely around the production of oil.

Overton's population skyrocketed from 426 in 1931 to 3,000 in 1933. By 1936 it was up to 4,500 and the town went through the Great Depression relatively unscathed. But by the end of World War II the population had declined by half—reaching just 2,000 in the 1950s and remaining at that level through the 1970s. In the 1980s Overton was Rusk County's "second city" with a population of 2,430 in 1983. By the 1990s Overton extended into neighboring Smith County.

Overton has a historical voting base consisting primarily of older, Republican-leaning voters.

=== "Republic of Texas" secessionist movement ===
In 2003, the City of Overton became home to the headquarters of only surviving faction of the Texan secessionist group, the Republic of Texas led by Daniel Miller. The group was founded on the belief that the United States never legally annexed the Republic of Texas and that Texas is therefore an independent nation, repudiating the Texas State Government and the federal government of the United States' authority over Texas.

The group was considered controversial by the residents of Overton, especially with the group's checkered past, which includes a week-long hostage situation after the incarceration of two members (leading to one death after the siege) with the hostages being called "prisoners of war". Another event occurred involving the arrest and conviction of two members who planned to assassinate then President, Bill Clinton, and other high-ranking officials. Both events are listen in the group's Terrorist Organization Profile. Although, Daniel Miller's faction was separated when these events occurred, there was still a stigma in Overton around the faction as they still retained the core beliefs that the other factions shared, including advocacy for illegal activities such as bank fraud and paper terrorism. The group is also accused of practicing white-supremacy.

The Republic of Texas also minted their own currency which included a one gram silver coin with a Texas star and the word "Overton" emblazoned around it, with members attempting to purchase goods with the currency instead of the United States dollar in Overton. Edward J. Williams, Overton's then chief of police, described several run-ins with the group, including a violent altercation between two members over an AR-15 automatic rifle, members using Republic of Texas passports instead of a driver's license; driving unregistered vehicles; and illegally redesigning license plates to show the original Republic of Texas' territorial claims prior to its annexation which includes territory in New Mexico and narrow strips of land in Oklahoma, Colorado and Wyoming. Diana Sieber, a resident and business owner in Overton, would comment: "No one really approves of them," and "They're not the best kind of publicity for our community."

The Republic of Texas operated in a former hospital within the city limits up until the headquarters mysteriously burned down on August 31, 2005; one person was moderately injured. This led to the group leaving Overton and rebranding as the Texas Nationalist Movement.

== Geography ==
According to the United States Census Bureau, the city has a total area of 6.8 square miles (17.5 km^{2}), of which 6.7 square miles (17.4 km^{2}) is land and 0.04 square mile (0.1 km^{2}) (0.59%) is water. Most of the city lies in Rusk County, with a small portion extending into Smith County.

=== Major highways ===
- State Highway 135
- State Highway 323

== Demographics ==
Historical population
Census	Pop.	Note	%±
1880	353		—
1890	401		13.6%
1920	528		—
1930	426		−19.3%
1940	2,313		443.0%
1950	2,001		−13.5%
1960	1,950		−2.5%
1970	2,084		6.9%
1980	2,430		16.6%
1990	2,105		−13.4%
2000	2,350		11.6%
2010	2,554		8.7%
2020	2,275		−10.9%
U.S. Decennial Census

=== 2020 census ===
As of the 2020 census, Overton had a population of 2,275. The median age was 37.9 years. 25.7% of residents were under the age of 18 and 17.0% of residents were 65 years of age or older. For every 100 females there were 91.5 males, and for every 100 females age 18 and over there were 86.6 males age 18 and over.

0.0% of residents lived in urban areas, while 100.0% lived in rural areas.

There were 884 households in Overton, of which 37.4% had children under the age of 18 living in them. Of all households, 44.6% were married-couple households, 16.9% were households with a male householder and no spouse or partner present, and 31.2% were households with a female householder and no spouse or partner present. About 26.4% of all households were made up of individuals and 11.7% had someone living alone who was 65 years of age or older. The 2020 census counted 580 families residing in the city.

There were 1,043 housing units, of which 15.2% were vacant. The homeowner vacancy rate was 3.9% and the rental vacancy rate was 9.3%.

Racial composition as of the 2020 census
Race	Number	Percent
White	1,691	74.3%
Black or African American	352	15.5%
American Indian and Alaska Native	24	1.1%
Asian	13	0.6%
Native Hawaiian and Other Pacific Islander	0	0.0%
Some other race	49	2.2%
Two or more races	146	6.4%
Hispanic or Latino (of any race)	139	6.1%

=== 2010 census ===
As of the census of 2010, there were 2,554 people, 935 households, and 639 families residing in the city. The population density was 375.6 people per square mile. There were 1,086 housing units at an average density of 159.7 per square mile. The racial makeup of the city was 80% White, 16.1% African American, 0.4% Native American, 1.4% from other races, and 2.1% from two or more races. 4% of the population are Hispanic or Latino of any race.

There were 935 households, out of which 32.8% had children under the age of 18 living with them, 47.7% were married couples living together, 15.6% had a female householder with no husband present, and 31.7% were non-families. 27.7% of all households were made up of individuals, and 13.2% had someone living alone who was 65 years of age or older. The average household size was 2.6 and the average family size was 3.18.

In the city, the population was spread out, with 26.9% under the age of 18, 5.8% from 20 to 24, 25.2% from 25 to 44, 23.5% from 45 to 64, and 15.2% who were 65 years of age or older. The median age was 35.2 years.

The median income for a household in the city was $32,292, and the median income for a family was $55,261. The per capita income for the city was $18,987. Males had a median income of $28,496 versus $17,237 for females.

== Government ==
=== State government ===
Overton is represented in the Texas Senate by Republican Kevin Eltife, District 1. The Rusk County portion of Overton is represented in the Texas House of Representatives by Republican Travis Clardy, District 11. The Smith County portion of Overton is represented in the Texas House of Representatives by Republican Bryan Hughes, District 5.

=== Federal government ===
At the federal level, the two U.S. senators from Texas are Republicans John Cornyn and Ted Cruz; Overton is part of Texas's 1st congressional district, which is currently represented by Republican Nathaniel Moran.

== Economy ==
=== Organization ===
The Overton Economic Development Corporation (EDC) is a community team made up of resident executives and business owners, responsible for attracting new investment and helping expand existing businesses within the city. With a seven-member board, the Overton EDC is funded by a $.0025 sales tax that allows the EDC to accomplish its goals.

=== Business assistance ===
Overton EDC provides business assistance to qualifying companies. They evaluate incentives for businesses to locate or expand in the Overton area and base their findings on taxes assessed and paid, the number of jobs created or retained, wages paid, local purchases of products and services, indirect employment gains and the general benefit of furthering the mission of the city of Overton Economic Development Corporation.

They primarily seek businesses in manufacturing, production, medical/health, hospitality and distribution. Funds may be used in land lease/purchase, building lease/purchase, rehabilitation or construction, capital equipment purchase, infrastructure improvements or employee training.

Funds may not be used for venture or equity capital, working capital/inventories or personal loans. Forms of business assistance include loans/loan guarantees, SBA 504, SBA 7(A) guaranteed and direct loan, and the rural economic development fund.

== Education ==
Most of the City of Overton is served by the Overton Independent School District; that district's portion is in Rusk County. The Arp Independent School District includes all of Overton in Smith County, and West Rusk ISD includes a small portion of Overton in Rusk County.

Areas in Overton ISD and West Rusk ISD are in the service area of Kilgore Junior College. Areas in Arp ISD are in the service area of Tyler Junior College.

== Media ==
=== Newspaper ===
- Overton Press (Closed in June 2011)
- Overton News
- Henderson Daily News

== Notable people ==
- Jerry L. Buchmeyer, United States District Judge for the Northern District of Texas
- Robert Lee Howze, major general who received the Medal of Honor during the Indian Wars
- Michael "Bo" Kelly, is a former American football fullback in the Arena Football League.
- Clyde Lee, served as head coach at Overton High School
- Earle Bradford Mayfield, was a lawyer and politician who served in both the Texas Senate and United States Senate
- Julie V. Philley, president of the University of Texas at Tyler

== Climate ==
The climate in this area is characterized by hot, humid summers and generally mild to cool winters. According to the Köppen Climate Classification system, Overton has a humid subtropical climate, abbreviated "Cfa" on climate maps.
