= The Henderson News =

Newspaper in Henderson, Texas

- Type: Semi-weekly newspaper
- Format: Broadsheet
- Owner: Carpenter Media Group
- Publisher: Alexander Gould
- Founded: 1930
- Headquarters: P.O. Box 30; Henderson, Texas 75653-4509; United States
- Circulation: 2,106 (as of 2023)
- Website: thehendersonnews.com

The Henderson News is a semi-weekly newspaper published in Henderson, Texas, on Wednesday afternoons and Sunday mornings. It is owned by Carpenter Media Group.

== History ==
The Henderson News was formed on October 6, 1930, the day after the discovery of the East Texas Oil Field.

In 2024, the paper's owner M. Roberts Media was acquired by Carpenter Media Group.

== Awards ==
Each year The Henderson News receives numerous honors and awards from the Texas Press Association and the North & East Texas Press Association, with previous Managing Editor Matthew Prosser receiving first place for news writing from the TPA and being named Journalist of the Year from the NETPA in 2012 and current Managing Editor and Senior Reporter, Amber Lollar, receiving First Place in Column Writing and Second Place in News Photo from NETPA for 2020, First Place in News Writing, Second Place in Headline Writing from TPA for 2022, along with Second Place in Headline Writing from NETPA, Third Place in Column Writing, Third Place in News Writing, and Fourth Place in News Photo.
