= Texas secession movements =

Movement that advocates Texas to be an independent sovereign state

Flag of Texas

Texas secession movements, also known as the Texas independence movement or Texit, refers to both the secession of the U.S. state of Texas during the American Civil War as well as activities of modern organizations supporting such efforts to secede from the United States and become an independent sovereign state.

The U.S. Constitution does not specifically address the secession of states, and the issue was a topic of debate after the American Revolutionary War until the American Civil War, when the U.S. Supreme Court ruled in Texas v. White that states strictly cannot unilaterally secede except through revolution or the expressed consent of the other states.

Texas was formerly called the Republic of Texas, a sovereign state for nine years prior to the Texas annexation by the United States. Accordingly, its sovereignty was not recognized by Mexico although Texas defeated the Mexican forces in the Texas Revolution.

Modern secession efforts have existed in the state at least since the 1990s and focused first on the Republic of Texas organization which ultimately splintered into several organizations, including the Texas Nationalist Movement. Recent discussions between Texas Republican Party representatives renewed talks of secession after the decision of the Supreme Court in Texas v. Pennsylvania, which declined to hear the case regarding attempts to overturn the 2020 presidential election due to lack of standing.

== Secession in the United States ==
Discussion about the right of U.S. states to secede from the union began shortly after the American Revolutionary War. The United States Constitution does not address secession. Each of the colonies originated by separate grants from the British Crown and had evolved relatively distinct political and cultural institutions prior to national independence. Craig S. Lerner has written that the Constitution's Supremacy Clause weighs against a right of secession, but that the Republican Guarantee Clause can be interpreted to indicate that the federal government has no right to keep a state from leaving as long as it maintains a republican form of government.

The question remained open in the decades before the Civil War. In 1825, Alexis de Tocqueville observed, "If today one of these same states wanted to withdraw its name from the contract, it would be quite difficult to prove that it could not do so. To combat it, the federal government would have no evident support in either force or right." However, Joseph Story wrote in 1830 in Commentaries on the Constitution that the document foreclosed the right of secession. On the eve of the Civil War, President Abraham Lincoln argued that states were not sovereign before the Constitution but instead they were created by it.

Current Supreme Court precedent, in Texas v. White, holds that the states cannot secede from the union by an act of the state. More recently, in 2006, Supreme Court Justice Antonin Scalia stated, "If there was any constitutional issue resolved by the Civil War, it is that there is no right to secede."

Although the Supreme Court ruled that no States can leave the Union, the 1845 Joint Resolution for Annexing Texas allows for the State of Texas to divide itself into five different states. However, even with this 1845 provision, the Constitution of the United States (Article IV, Section 3) still requires the consent of Congress to admit any new states.

== Republic of Texas (19th century) ==
Texas seceded from Mexico in 1836, spurred on primarily by American settlers in the former Mexican territory against the government of Santa Anna.

After the final engagement at San Jacinto in 1836, there were two different visions of the future of Texas: one as a state of the United States and the other as an independent republic. Sam Houston promoted the first, as he felt that the newly independent country, lacking hard currency and still facing threats from Mexico, could not survive on its own. The other was promoted by second Texas president Mirabeau B. Lamar, who felt that it was Texas's destiny to be a nation that extended from the Louisiana border to the Pacific Ocean. For this reason, Lamar is considered the father of Texas nationalism.

The Republic under Lamar incurred large-scale debt, and suffered from a poor economy and inadequate defenses, which led to the annexation of Texas into the United States in 1845. Since then, the state's time as an independent nation has been the basis of a lasting sense of national identity.

== Secession from the U.S., 1861 ==
The history of Texas in the Civil War has distinctions from the rest of the South, in part because of its history of being independent previously. Much of Texas's dissatisfaction was not only tied to opposition to Lincoln and his view of states' rights (which they also viewed as a transgression of the annexation agreement), but also because they did not feel that Washington had lived up to promises of inclusion into the country as part of annexation. In 1861, Sam Houston still strongly supported remaining in the United States primarily for economic and military reasons. However, those promoting secession used not only elements from U.S. history such as the American Revolution and the Constitution, but also the Texas Revolution and elements from the history of the Republic of Texas.

On February 1, 1861, delegates to a special convention to consider secession voted 166 to 8 to adopt an ordinance of secession which cited the institution of slavery as the primary cause of secession. The ordinance was ratified by a popular referendum on February 23, making Texas the seventh and last state of the Lower South to do so.

1861 Texas Secession Referendum Map by county, teal is For and orange is Against

Some wanted to restore the Republic of Texas, but an identity with the Confederacy was embraced. This led to the replacement of Texas themes for the most part with those of the Confederacy, including religious justification given in sermons, often demanded by petitioners. The transference to the Stars and Bars was in the hope of achieving the inclusion perceived by some to be denied by Washington. However, that shift was never complete. Clayton E. Jewett wrote in Texas in the Confederacy: An Experiment in Nation Building that its identity remained somewhat separate from the rest of the Confederacy. James Marten wrote in Texas Divided: Loyalty and Dissent in the Lone Star State, 1856–1874 that it battled between loyalty to the Confederacy and dissent and its ambivalence may have been enough to assure Southern defeat.

During the war, Texas was spared most of the actual fighting, with only Galveston seeing any military engagement with Union forces. However, the war did take a serious toll in the way of chronic shortages, absence of men at home to run the economy, military setbacks and fear of invasion. Although Lincoln recognized Texas's history as an independent nation, his definition of the Union meant that Texas forever ceded this to be subject to the Constitution.

== From the Civil War to the 1990s ==
After the end of the Civil War, Texans maintained a "rebel" or Confederate identity instead of a completely Texan one as a way of still defying the United States. After the Civil War, it provided a haven for others in the Confederacy leaving claimed devastation. From that time to the present, a "Lost Cause" mythology has continued in Texas and other areas of the South. However, for the most part, overt discussion of the right of states to secede ended, replaced by another mythology based on the indivisibility of the territory. This did not end Texas's identity as at least somewhat different from the rest of the United States. Unlike southern states, Texas began emphasizing its cowboy heritage and connection with the U.S. Southwest, even influencing the rest of the U.S. identity in the 20th century. For many Texans, the history of the Republic of Texas is considered a time of independence and self-determination often in contrast to interference by the federal government in Washington. Texas requires a course in the state's history in the seventh grade where these ideas can also be found.

In the 1990s, Texas began to use the slogan "Texas. It's Like a Whole Other Country" especially in domestic ads for tourism, and still can be seen today. However, public imagination remains split on the visions of Texas as state and nation that Houston and Lamar had in the 19th century. The two can appear as a conflict between rural and urban Texans but the Lamar vision can be found in the cities as well. Texas did not join in festivities for the 150th anniversary of the Civil War as it was thought that the commemoration would have reopened old unhealed wounds.

== 1990s to present ==
There have been efforts to promote Texas secession in the state at least since the 1990s. At this time, Richard Lance McLaren founded the Republic of Texas organization based on his property within the Davis Mountains Resort in Jeff Davis County, becoming the most active and influential secession group at the time. Essentially the organization claimed that the United States annexed Texas illegally and considered it to be held captive. The organization held itself out as an alternative government, based on the principle of very limited powers.

McLaren had both supporters and enemies. His supporters generally believed that globalization was a threat to constitutional rights and against Christian principles. Tactics of the group included filing liens against properties, disavowing state and federal authorities, and opening an "embassy". McLaren's legal filings were so numerous that the county clerk gave them a separate cabinet. Members of the Republic of Texas group listed grievances with the U.S. government, such as accusing the government of a corrupt judicial system, paganism, and of creating illegal treaties and illegitimate agencies. Members of the group also stated that the U.S. government had set itself above the people and had exercised its global influences unlawfully against the Constitution. The Republic of Texas members placed emphasis on the Branch Davidian incident near Waco as an example of all that was wrong with the U.S. government.

In the summer of 1996, injunctions and other court proceedings against McLaren were well underway. In July of that year, McLaren held a press conference a block away from the state courthouse in Austin stating that he refused to appear because he did not recognize the legitimacy of the court. McLaren was jailed for a month by a federal judge for failing to show in court. After his release, McLaren's rhetoric grew stronger.

== Movements ==
=== Davis Mountains standoff ===
In March 1997, McLaren wrote to the federal government to claim 93 trillion dollars in reparations to Texas for the Civil War. By this time, the Republic of Texas organization had fractured into three factions. When two of McLaren's groups were arrested, McLaren took two hostages and holed up with armed supporters on his property, leading to a standoff with Texas Department of Public Safety. The siege ended on May 4, 1997, with McLaren and four others giving up without violence, while two others from the group, Mike Matson and Richard Keyes, fled the hideout armed with handguns and deer hunting rifles. The following day, the fugitives, with the troopers in hot pursuit, fired at a Black Hawk helicopter and searching dogs in the Davis Mountains; Matson was killed by return fire, while Keyes managed to slip away. He was eventually caught in September at New Waverly, north of Houston. In November of that year, McLaren was convicted of kidnapping and was sentenced to 99 years in prison. McLaren was also convicted of federal mail fraud and bank fraud in the U.S. District Court for the Northern District of Texas in Dallas. He is imprisoned at the William P. Clements Unit of the Texas Department of Criminal Justice, near Amarillo, Texas, and is scheduled for release on June 15, 2041.

As of 2003, there were three groups that claimed to be the Republic of Texas with different web sites, but without McLaren named as a leader.

=== Texas Nationalist Movement ===
The Texas Nationalist Movement (TNM), headed by Daniel Miller, evolved from one of the factions of the old Republic of Texas in 2005. However, the organization has disassociated itself from the Republic of Texas and the tactics of McLaren, instead opting for more political rather than confrontational or violent solution. The group has county-level groups in most parts of the state.

According to its website, the objective of the Texas Nationalist Movement is "the complete, total and unencumbered political, cultural and economic independence of Texas". Unlike its predecessor, TNM claims to work peaceably with the current political system, and to reject use of force to achieve its goals. TNM is an unincorporated association under the laws of the State of Texas. The organization focuses on political support and advocacy, and education surrounding the issue of secession. It seeks to have the Texas Legislature call for a state-wide referendum on the issue, similar to the Scottish Independence vote of 2014.

In January 2013, members of the TNM rallied at the state capital in Austin to promote the resolution, resulting in one mention of secession by one lawmaker on the opening day of the legislative session. In May 2016, the Texas GOP narrowly rejected bringing a resolution for secession to a floor vote at the 2016 Texas Republican Convention. However, in 2020, the Republican Party of Texas included a plank in its party platform (with 93% approval) stating that the federal government has impaired Texas' right to self-government, that any legislation infringing upon the Tenth Amendment to the United States Constitution "should be ignored, opposed, refused, and nullified", and that Texas retains the right to secede if any future Congress or President change the current political system from a constitutional republic to something else. In June 2022, it voted to include a further secessionist plank in its party platform, calling for the Texas Legislature to approve a referendum on whether Texas should secede from the Union on the 2023 statewide ballot.

In 2015, a representative from the Texas Nationalist Movement attended a separatist conference in Russia. Public record show that the conference was almost entirely paid for by the Kremlin's "National Charitable Foundation". During Russia's 2016 interference operations in the U.S., a fake Russian Facebook page, dubbed "Heart of Texas," claimed it was passing information about supporters along to the Texas Nationalist Movement.

In 2024, the TNM declared its support for secessionist groups in Northern Mexico. In 2024, Miller submitted over 140,000 signatures from petitions signed in support of secession. Miller said of the rising support for secession:

If you look at where support is for this issue right now, in this lifecycle of an independence movement, we're outperforming Brexit, we're outperforming Scottish independence and we're outperforming Catalan — and we're outperforming everyone at every stage of the process.

=== Other discussions of secession starting in 2012 ===
The rise of membership in the Texas Nationalist Movement coincided with other secession-related news events not part of that organization. Governor Rick Perry, at a political rally in 2009, addressed the possibility of secession. During the rally, many in the crowd began to chant "secede, secede", to which Perry remarked, "If Washington continues to thumb their nose at the American people, you know, who knows what might come out of that?" Perry subsequently clarified that the comment was tongue in cheek and that he does not support secession. His remarks sparked controversy and harsh criticism from government officials and pundits, such as Jeff Macke and Joe Weisental.

After Perry's comments received news coverage, Rasmussen Reports found that about 1 in 3 of those it polled believed that Texas has the right to secede from the United States, although only 18% would support secession and 75% would oppose secession. In another poll, 60% of Texans surveyed opposed becoming an independent nation. However, 48% of Texas Republicans surveyed supported it. The reaction from outside the state was also strongly split, including those who wanted to get rid of Texas.

After US president Barack Obama won the 2012 US presidential election, bumper stickers and signs saying "secede" started to appear in Texas. The election also triggered a wave of petitions on the White House "We the People" website. While the Texas petition was not first to appear, it overtook those of the other states with over 125,000 signatures, well above the 25,000 required to trigger a response. The petition stated that secession would "protect the original ideas and beliefs of our founding fathers which are no longer being reflected by the federal government" and defend Texans from "blatant abuses to their rights" The Texas secession petition was followed by one allowing Austin to secede from Texas and stay part of the union. The White House issued a 476-word response rejecting the idea.

In June 2016, when a 52–48 majority in the U.K. voted to leave the European Union (EU) using the hashtag #Brexit on social media, there was renewed interest that Texas formalize efforts to secede from the U.S., using the hashtag #Texit.

=== Republican Party of Texas platform and 2020s referendum proposals ===
In December 2020, when the Supreme Court refused to hear Texas's lawsuit in Texas v. Pennsylvania, the chair of the Texas GOP, Allen West, suggested that Texas and other like-minded states could leave the Union. On January 26, 2021, the Texas Independence Referendum Act (HB 1359), a bill to provide for a nonbinding statewide referendum on secession, was filed by Texas House member Kyle Biedermann. The bill was referred to the State Affairs committee but it was never given a hearing or voted on by the committee before the end of the session.

In June 2022, the Republican Party of Texas released their Report of the Permanent 2022 Platform & Resolutions Committee which urges the legislature to introduce a referendum in 2023 to secede from the United States. In March 2023, state representative Bryan Slaton introduced a bill that would add a referendum on independence to the 2024 US election ballot. In December 2023, the Texas Nationalist Movement claimed that it collected enough signatures under the petition to include a question on secession on the ballot in 2024. It was clarified that even if the proposition passes, it would be non-binding. Similar secession movements in other states, particularly the states of the Southern United States, have been described as being associated with their support of former US president Donald Trump for the 2022 US elections.

The Standoff at Eagle Pass has increased support for secession.

== Opinion polling ==
Date(s) conducted	Polling organization/client	Sample size	Support secession	Oppose secession	Undecided	Net support
August 2009	Rasmussen Reports	--	18%	75%	7%	−57%
September 2–6, 2010	Public Policy Polling	538	15%	72%	13%	−57%
August 12–14, 2016	Public Policy Polling	944	26%	59%	15%	−33%
February 1-3, 2024	Redfield & Wilton Strategies	814	33%	39%	28%	−6%

=== Alternative question wording ===
==== Along with other conservative states ====
Date(s) conducted	Polling organization/client	Sample size	Support secession	Oppose secession	Undecided	Net support
June 6–26, 2022	SurveyUSA	625	60%	40%	-	+20%

==== If Hillary Clinton had won the 2016 election ====
Date(s) conducted	Polling organization/client	Sample size	Support secession	Oppose secession	Undecided	Net support
August 12–14, 2016	Public Policy Polling	944	40%	48%	12%	−8%

== In fiction ==
The secession of Texas from the United States or the continued existence of the Republic of Texas has featured in some works of fiction, often set during a Second American Revolution or a Second American Civil War and, occasionally, in tandem with American Civil War alternate histories:

- The second edition of The People's Almanac posits the question of what would have happened had the Confederacy won the Civil War. The Almanac uses the assumptions of author MacKinlay Kantor from his book If the South Had Won the Civil War. According to Kantor, Texas would initially remain with the Confederacy but would have significant economic ties with the Union due to its export of cattle. It would therefore declare its independence in 1878 (annexing Indian Territory—now Oklahoma—in the process); both the Union and the Confederacy "were more relieved than upset" at the move. Texas would abolish slavery in 1885 (the same year as the Confederacy). Movements in the Confederacy toward "Consolidation"—reunion of the three countries—would result in their combined entry into both World Wars I and II, and ultimately at the reunion on December 20, 1960, exactly 100 years after South Carolina originally seceded from the Union in response to a Soviet nuclear threat from Alaska.
- In the Settling Accounts tetralogy of Harry Turtledove's Southern Victory Series, set in an alternate reality where the Confederacy won the 'War of Secession' (1861–1862). Texas secedes from the Confederacy in 1944 during the Second Great War when it was clear that the CSA under Freedom Party rule and the presidency of Jake Featherston would ultimately lose. Under the presidency of former Freedom Party governor Wright Patman, the Republic of Texas signs an armistice and collaborates with the United States, arresting and trying Confederate concentration camp guards for crimes against humanity and allowing the U.S. state of Houston to be recreated. It is unclear if Texan independence continues beyond 1944.
- The Crosstime Traffic novel The Disunited States of America is largely set in an alternate reality where the ratification of the Articles of Confederation resulted in the dissolution of the United States in the 1800s and a frequent series of minor wars between the smaller successor states. Texas is mentioned as a prominent oil-producing republic.
- In The Difference Engine by William Gibson and Bruce Sterling, Charles Babbage successfully develops an analytical engine in 1824, resulting in the early arrival of the Information Age and the ascendency of the British Empire as a world power. Due to British interference in North American affairs chiefly to prevent the rise of the United States as a world power, the Republic of Texas remains an independent state by 1855, with Sam Houston appearing as the president-in-exile, having fled the country following a coup and the establishment of a military junta.
- In The Handmaid's Tale by Margaret Atwood, the Republic of Texas is mentioned as being a successor state to the theonomic Republic of Gilead at a history symposium in Nunavut in 2195. In the sequel The Testaments, it was revealed that Texas declared independence shortly after the establishment of Gilead. A stalemated secessionist war cements Texan independence but enforces Texan neutrality in Gileadian affairs. In Season 4 of The Handmaid's Tale television series, the Republic of Texas is mentioned as a potential refuge for a group of escaped Handmaids.
- In Russian Amerika by Stony Compton, the Republic of Texas is mentioned as being one of many rump states that comprised the former United States and Canada in an alternate reality where a Civil War which broke out in the 1850s resulted in a Confederate victory.
- In the Sliders episode "The Good, the Bad and the Wealthy", Texas had declared independence during the American Civil War, enveloping the former U.S. state of California. In 1996, George H. W. Bush served as Texian President and gunfighting was legal.
- In the 2006 television series Jericho—created by Stephen Chbosky, Josh Schaer, and Jonathan E. Steinberg—the Independent Republic of Texas is mentioned and credited with saving the United States after a series of nuclear attacks.
- In Underground Airlines by Ben H. Winters, the assassination of President-elect Abraham Lincoln in 1861 resulted in the adoption of a modified version of the Crittenden Compromise and the continued practice of slavery into the twenty-first century in the so-called 'Hard Four' States (Carolina, Alabama, Mississippi and Louisiana). The state's growing abolitionist Black and Hispanic populations led Texas to declare independence from the United States during the presidency of Lyndon B. Johnson, starting a fifteen-year-long 'Texas War' ending in stalemate. The status of Texas as either a U.S. state or an independent republic remained ambiguous thereafter.

== See also ==
- Secession in the United States
- Hawaiian sovereignty movement
- Partition and secession in California
- Quebec sovereignty movement
