= Republic of Texas (group) =

General term for several organizations

Republic of Texas logo used on some group documents and websites

The Republic of Texas (and also known as Provisional Government of the Republic of Texas) is a general term for several organizations, some of which have been called militia groups, that claim the annexation of Texas by the United States was illegal and that Texas remains an independent nation to this day but is under occupation. The issue of the legal status of Texas led the group to claim to have reinstated a provisional government on December 13, 1995. Activists within the movement claim over 40,000 active supporters, and public opinion polls have shown significant support for the secession of Texas or other states. A September 2014 Reuters/Ipsos poll found over 34% of people in southwestern states favored their own state seceding from the United States. So far, however, supporters have not managed to turn these public sentiments into concrete moves toward an independent Texas.

== History ==
The movement for independence was started by Richard Lance "Rick" McLaren (born c. 1953). McLaren claimed that, in 1861, Texans voted four-to-one to leave the Union. That most Union loyalists were prevented from voting by violence, threats, and terrorism, he ignored. McLaren still concluded that Texas still met the qualifications, under international law, of a captive nation of war since the end of the American Civil War in 1865, a claim not supported by scholars.

The movement split into three factions in 1996, one led by McLaren, one by David Johnson and Jesse Enloe, and the third by Archie Lowe and Daniel Miller. In 1997, McLaren and his followers kidnapped Joe and Margaret Ann Rowe, held them hostage at the Davis Mountain Resort, and demanded the release of a movement member in exchange for the release of the Rowes. McLaren's wife, Evelyn, convinced him to surrender peacefully after a week-long standoff with police and Texas Rangers. McLaren and four other Republic of Texas members were sent to prison. Two other members of the group, Richard F. Keyes III and Mike Matson managed to slip away. Matson was shot dead by Texas Rangers two days later, while Keyes surrendered to the authorities on September 19. In June 1998, Keyes was convicted of burglary with intent to commit aggravated assault and sentenced to 90 years in prison. This effectively destroyed the McLaren faction, and the Johnson-Enloe faction was discredited after two of its members, Jack Abbot Grebe Jr. and Johnnie Wise, were convicted in 1998 of threatening to assassinate several government officials, including President Bill Clinton. The two men were each sentenced to 24 years in prison.

In a case involving Richard McLaren and his wife Evelyn as plaintiffs, a United States District Court in the District of Columbia ruled on April 30, 1998: "Despite plaintiffs' argument ..... [i]n 1845, Texas became the 28th state of the United States of America. The Republic of Texas no longer exists."

In 2003, what remained of the organized movement consolidated into one dominant group recognizing an "interim" government (which replaced the "provisional" government), headed by Daniel Miller. This interim government claimed authority from the original proclamations of 1995 and set up a headquarters in the town of Overton, Texas. The movement split again over legal arguments, resulting in the current state of affairs. Most of the original personalities of the movement have disappeared from public view. The organization's finances have come from donations and the sale of some items such as a Republic of Texas passport. The Republic of Texas headquarters in Overton burned down on August 31, 2005; one person was moderately injured.

In January 2004, a man in jail in Aspen, Colorado claimed that the state of Colorado had no jurisdiction to extradite him to California on a probation warrant, on the grounds that he was a citizen of the Republic of Texas. He said that the sliver of land which contains Aspen was a part of the original Republic of Texas and, as such, he was not a citizen of the United States. His claim was rejected by the courts.

In 2010 the group was referenced in U.S. Army War College paper entitled "War: Will, Action and Resources", the paper expanded the definition of war to include non-state actors.

In February 2015, the Federal Bureau of Investigation (FBI), the Texas Attorney General's office, Brazos County deputies and police from the city of Bryan, Texas conducted a raid on a meeting of about sixty followers of a Republic of Texas group. No arrests were made, but the officers seized computers, phones and other items. The raid was conducted in connection with an allegation that a member of the group, claiming to be "chief justice of the international Common Law Court for the Republic of Texas", had issued phony writs of "quo warranto" and "mandamus" and a phony "subpoena", purporting to order both an attorney and a Texas state court judge to appear at "hearings" apparently to be conducted by the group at Bryan, Texas. In 2011, the vice president of the group sent a letter to the governor of Oklahoma, asserting that the governor faced indictment because Oklahoma's counties were "trespassing inside the geographical boundaries" of the Republic of Texas. On April 27, 2015, McLaren, while an inmate at the Texas Clements Unit in Amarillo, Texas, served "Legal Notice of Commencement of Special Inter-Actions" against Chief Justice Richard Barajas, Senior Status, of El Paso, Texas asserting "Declaration at Law Executing Rights Law on or over the Texian Territory".

== Media ==
The 2013 independent film The Republic of Rick is a fictional story based on the history of Rick McLaren and the Republic of Texas. It was an official 2014 Slamdance Film Festival selection.

== See also ==
- Legal status of Texas
- Texas secession movements
- List of active separatist movements in North America
