= List of U.S. states by date of admission to the Union =

The order in which the original 13 states ratified the 1787 Constitution, then the order in which the others were admitted to the Union.

A state of the United States is one of the 50 constituent entities that shares its sovereignty with the federal government. Americans are citizens of both the federal republic and of the state in which they reside, due to the shared sovereignty between each state and the federal government. Kentucky, Massachusetts, Pennsylvania, and Virginia use the term "commonwealth" rather than state in their full official names.

States are the primary subdivisions of the United States. They possess all powers not granted to the federal government nor prohibited to them by the Constitution of the United States. In general, state governments have the power to regulate issues of local concern, such as regulating intrastate commerce, running elections, creating local governments, public school policy, and non-federal road construction and maintenance. Each state has its own constitution grounded in republican principles, and government consisting of executive, legislative, and judicial branches.

All states and their residents are represented in the federal Congress, a bicameral legislature consisting of the Senate and the House of Representatives. Each state is represented by two senators, and at least one representative, while the size of a state's House delegation depends on its total population, as determined by the most recent constitutionally mandated decennial census. Additionally, each state is entitled to select a number of electors to vote in the Electoral College, the body that elects the president and vice president of the United States, equal to the total of representatives and senators in Congress from that state.

Article IV, Section 3, Clause 1 of the Constitution grants to Congress the authority to admit new states into the Union. Since the establishment of the United States in 1776, the number of states has expanded from the original 13 to 50. Each new state has been admitted on an equal footing with the existing states.

== List of U.S. states ==
The following table is a list of all 50 states and their respective dates of statehood. The first 13 became states in July 1776 upon agreeing to the United States Declaration of Independence, and each joined the first Union of states between 1777 and 1781, upon ratifying the Articles of Confederation, its first constitution. (A separate table is included below showing AoC ratification dates.) These states are presented in the order in which each ratified the 1787 Constitution and joined the others in the new (and current) federal government. The date of admission listed for each subsequent state is the official date set by Act of Congress. (Note: This list does not account for the secession of 11 states (Virginia, North Carolina, South Carolina, Georgia, Florida, Alabama, Mississippi, Tennessee, Arkansas, Louisiana, and Texas) during the Civil War to form the Confederate States of America, nor for the subsequent restoration of those states to the Union, or each state's "readmission to representation in Congress" after the war, as the federal government does not give legal recognition to their having left the Union. Also, the Constitution is silent on the question of whether states have the power to secede from the Union, but the Supreme Court held that a state cannot unilaterally do so in Texas v. White (1869).)

State		Date (admitted or ratified)	Formed from
1	Delaware	December 7, 1787 (ratified)	Colony of Delaware (Note: Known at the time as the "Three Lower Counties Upon Delaware", a semi-autonomous region of Pennsylvania, Delaware became a state on June 15, 1776, when the Delaware Assembly formally adopted a resolution declaring an end to Delaware's status as a colony of Great Britain and establishing the three counties as an independent state under the authority of "the Government of the Counties of New Castle, Kent and Sussex Upon Delaware", effectively delinking the Lower Counties from Pennsylvania altogether.)
2	Pennsylvania	December 12, 1787 (ratified)	Proprietary Province of Pennsylvania
3	New Jersey	December 18, 1787 (ratified)	Crown Colony of New Jersey
4	Georgia	January 2, 1788 (ratified)	Crown Colony of Georgia
5	Connecticut	January 9, 1788 (ratified)	Crown Colony of Connecticut
6	Massachusetts	February 6, 1788 (ratified)	Crown Colony of Massachusetts Bay
7	Maryland	April 28, 1788 (ratified)	Proprietary Province of Maryland
8	South Carolina	May 23, 1788 (ratified)	Crown Colony of South Carolina
9	New Hampshire	June 21, 1788 (ratified)	Crown Colony of New Hampshire
10	Virginia	June 25, 1788 (ratified)	Crown Colony and Dominion of Virginia
11	New York	July 26, 1788 (ratified)	Crown Colony of New York
12	North Carolina	November 21, 1789 (ratified)	Crown Colony of North Carolina
13	Rhode Island	May 29, 1790 (ratified)	Crown Colony of Rhode Island and Providence Plantations
14	Vermont	March 4, 1791 (admitted)	Vermont Republic (Note: Between 1749 and 1764 the provincial governor of New Hampshire, Benning Wentworth, issued approximately 135 grants for unoccupied land claimed by New Hampshire west of the Connecticut River (in what is today southern Vermont), territory that was also claimed by New York. The resulting "New Hampshire Grants" dispute led to the rise of the Green Mountain Boys, and the later establishment of the Vermont Republic. New Hampshire's claim upon the land was extinguished in 1764 by royal order of George III, and in 1790 the State of New York ceded its land claim to Vermont for 30,000 dollars.)
15	Kentucky	June 1, 1792 (admitted)	Virginia (nine counties in its District of Kentucky (Note: The Virginia General Assembly adopted legislation on December 18, 1789, separating its "District of Kentucky" from the rest of the State and approving its statehood.))
16	Tennessee	June 1, 1796 (admitted)	Southwest Territory
17	Ohio	March 1, 1803 (Note: The exact date upon which Ohio became a state is unclear. On April 30, 1802, the 7th Congress had passed an act "authorizing the inhabitants of Ohio to form a Constitution and state government, and admission of Ohio into the Union" (Sess. 1, ch. 40, 2 Stat. 173). On February 19, 1803, the same Congress passed an act "providing for the execution of the laws of the United States in the State of Ohio" (Sess. 2, ch. 7, 2 Stat. 201). Neither act, however, set a formal date of statehood. An official statehood date for Ohio was not set until 1953, when the 83rd Congress passed a Joint resolution "for admitting the State of Ohio into the Union", (Pub. L. 83–204, 67 Stat. 407, enacted August 7, 1953) which designated March 1, 1803, as that date.) (admitted)	Northwest Territory (part)
18	Louisiana	April 30, 1812 (admitted)	Territory of Orleans
19	Indiana	December 11, 1816 (admitted)	Indiana Territory
20	Mississippi	December 10, 1817 (admitted)	Mississippi Territory
21	Illinois	December 3, 1818 (admitted)	Illinois Territory (part)
22	Alabama	December 14, 1819 (admitted)	Alabama Territory
23	Maine	March 15, 1820 (admitted)	Massachusetts (District of Maine (Note: The Massachusetts General Court passed enabling legislation on June 19, 1819, separating the "District of Maine" from the rest of the State (an action approved by the voters in Maine on July 19, 1819, by 17,001 to 7,132); then, on February 25, 1820, passed a follow-up measure officially accepting the fact of Maine's imminent statehood.))
24	Missouri	August 10, 1821 (admitted)	Missouri Territory (part)
25	Arkansas	June 15, 1836 (admitted)	Arkansas Territory
26	Michigan	January 26, 1837 (admitted)	Michigan Territory
27	Florida	March 3, 1845 (admitted)	Florida Territory
28	Texas	December 29, 1845 (admitted)	Republic of Texas
29	Iowa	December 28, 1846 (admitted)	Iowa Territory (part)
30	Wisconsin	May 29, 1848 (admitted)	Wisconsin Territory (part)
31	California	September 9, 1850 (admitted)	Unorganized territory / Mexican Cession (part) (Note: Most of the region ceded by Mexico to the United States in 1848, following the Bear Flag Revolt and the Mexican–American War, had been the Mexican Department of Alta California. The Act of Congress establishing California as the 31st state was part of the Compromise of 1850.)
32	Minnesota	May 11, 1858 (admitted)	Minnesota Territory (part)
33	Oregon	February 14, 1859 (admitted)	Oregon Territory (part)
34	Kansas	January 29, 1861 (admitted)	Kansas Territory (part)
35	West Virginia	June 20, 1863 (admitted)	Virginia (50 Trans-Allegheny region counties (Note: On May 13, 1862, the General Assembly of the Restored Government of Virginia passed an act granting permission for creation of West Virginia. Later, by its ruling in Virginia v. West Virginia (1871), the Supreme Court implicitly affirmed that the breakaway Virginia counties did have the proper consents necessary to become a separate state.))
36	Nevada	October 31, 1864 (admitted)	Nevada Territory
37	Nebraska	March 1, 1867 (admitted)	Nebraska Territory
38	Colorado	August 1, 1876 (admitted)	Colorado Territory
39	North Dakota	November 2, 1889 (Note: Brought into existence within moments of each other on the same day, North and South Dakota are the nation's only twin-born states. Before signing the statehood papers, President Benjamin Harrison shuffled the papers so that no one would know which became a state first. By custom, North Dakota is commonly recognized as the 39th state and South Dakota as the 40th, as "n" precedes "s" in the alphabet.) (admitted)	Dakota Territory (part)
40	South Dakota	November 2, 1889 (admitted)	Dakota Territory (part)
41	Montana	November 8, 1889 (admitted)	Montana Territory
42	Washington	November 11, 1889 (admitted)	Washington Territory
43	Idaho	July 3, 1890 (admitted)	Idaho Territory
44	Wyoming	July 10, 1890 (admitted)	Wyoming Territory
45	Utah	January 4, 1896 (admitted)	Utah Territory
46	Oklahoma	November 16, 1907 (admitted)	Oklahoma Territory and Indian Territory
47	New Mexico	January 6, 1912 (admitted)	New Mexico Territory
48	Arizona	February 14, 1912 (admitted)	Arizona Territory
49	Alaska	January 3, 1959 (admitted)	Territory of Alaska
50	Hawaii	August 21, 1959 (admitted)	Territory of Hawaii

== Articles of Confederation ratification dates ==
The Second Continental Congress approved the Articles of Confederation for ratification by the individual states on November 15, 1777. The Articles of Confederation came into force on March 1, 1781, after being ratified by all 13 states. On March 4, 1789, the general government under the Articles was replaced with the federal government under the present Constitution.

State		Date
1	Virginia	December 16, 1777
2	South Carolina	February 5, 1778
3	New York	February 6, 1778
4	Rhode Island	February 9, 1778
5	Connecticut	February 12, 1778
6	Georgia	February 26, 1778
7	New Hampshire	March 4, 1778
8	Pennsylvania	March 5, 1778
9	Massachusetts	March 10, 1778
10	North Carolina	April 5, 1778
11	New Jersey	November 19, 1778
12	Delaware	February 1, 1779
13	Maryland	February 2, 1781

== See also ==
- Territorial evolution of the United States
- Enabling Act of 1802, authorizing residents of the eastern portion of the Northwest Territory to form the state of Ohio
- Missouri Compromise, 1820 federal statute enabling the admission of Missouri (a slave state) and Maine (a free state) into the Union
- Toledo War, 1835–36 boundary dispute between Ohio and the adjoining Michigan Territory, which delayed Michigan's admission to the Union
- Texas annexation, the 1845 incorporation of the Republic of Texas into the United States as a state in the Union

- Legal status of Texas

- Compromise of 1850, a package of congressional acts, one of which provided for the admission of California to the Union
- Bleeding Kansas, a series of violent conflicts in Kansas Territory involving anti-slavery and pro-slavery factions in the years preceding Kansas statehood, 1854–61
- Enabling Act of 1889, authorizing residents of Dakota, Montana, and Washington territories to form state governments (Dakota to be divided into two states) and to gain admission to the Union
- Oklahoma Enabling Act, authorizing residents of the Oklahoma and Indian territories to form a state government and to be admitted to the union as a single state, and, authorizing the people of New Mexico and Arizona territories to form a state government and be admitted into the Union, requiring a referendum to determine if both territories should be admitted as a single state
- Alaska Statehood Act, admitting Alaska as a state in the Union as of January 3, 1959
- Hawaii Admission Act, admitting Hawaii as a state in the Union as of August 21, 1959

- Legal status of Hawaii

- List of states and territories of the United States
- Federalism in the United States
- 51st state
