= Gompers v. Buck's Stove & Range Co. =

Gompers v. Buck's Stove and Range Co.
- Supreme Court of the United States

Argued January 27, 30, 1911 Decided May 15, 1911
- Full case name: Samuel Gompers, John Mitchell, and Frank Morrison v. Buck's Stove and Range Company
- Citations: 221 U.S. 418 (more) 31 S. Ct. 492; 55 L. Ed. 797; 1911 U.S. LEXIS 1746

Case history
- Prior: On appeal from the Court of Appeals of the District of Columbia

Holding
- In part, court of appeals erred in treating contempt action as one for criminal contempt because the proceeding was in equity; case is moot, in part.

Court membership
- Chief Justice Edward D. White Associate Justices John M. Harlan · Joseph McKenna; Oliver W. Holmes Jr. · William R. Day; Horace H. Lurton · Charles E. Hughes; Willis Van Devanter · Joseph R. Lamar

Case opinion
- Majority: Lamar, joined by unanimous

Laws applied
- Sherman Antitrust Act

Gompers v. Buck's Stove and Range Co., 221 U.S. 418 (1911), was a ruling by the United States Supreme Court involving a case of contempt for violating the terms of an injunction restraining labor union leaders from a boycott or from publishing any statement that there was or had been a boycott.

== Facts ==
In 1907 the metal polishers in the Buck Stove and Range Company in St. Louis, Missouri, struck for a nine-hour day. After the American Federation of Labor put the company on its "unfair list," the company obtained a sweeping injunction forbidding this boycott. For their refusal to obey, Samuel Gompers, John Mitchell and Frank Morrison were sentenced to prison for contempt.

== Judgment ==
The Supreme Court dismissed the case, in part, as moot. Buck's Stove president James Van Cleave had died in 1910 and his successor resolved his dispute with the workers. The court also reversed the contempt decision on the grounds that the proceedings should have been instituted by the court rather than the plaintiff (the Buck's Stove company).

In the second contempt trial held in 1912, the defendants were again found guilty and sentenced to prison. The Supreme Court overturned the convictions in Gompers v. United States, because the proceedings had not been instituted within the three-year statute of limitations imposed by the Clayton Antitrust Act.

== See also ==
- History of labor law in the United States
- List of United States Supreme Court cases, volume 221
