= Asymmetric federalism =

Imbalance of powers as between members

Asymmetric federalism or asymmetrical federalism is found in a federation or other types of union in which different constituent states possess different powers: one or more of the substates has considerably more autonomy than the other substates, although they have the same constitutional status. This is in contrast to symmetric federalism, where no distinction is made between constituent states. As a result, it is frequently proposed as a solution to the dissatisfaction that arises when one or more constituent units feel significantly different needs from the others, as the result of an ethnic, linguistic or cultural difference. Similar asymmetric devolution or distribution of powers can also exist in officially unitary states, such as Spain.

The difference between an asymmetric federation and federacy is indistinct. A federacy is essentially an extreme case of an asymmetric federation, either due to large differences in the level of autonomy, or the rigidity of the constitutional arrangements. An asymmetric federation, however, has to have a federal constitution, and all states in federation have the same formal status ("state"), while in a federacy independent substate has a different status ("autonomous region").

== Types ==
Asymmetrical federalism can be divided into two types of agreements or arrangements. The first type resolves differences in legislative powers, representation in central institutions, and rights and obligations that are set in the constitution. This type of asymmetry can be called de jure asymmetry (Brown 2). The second type reflects agreements which come out of national policy, opting out, and (depending on one's definition of the term) bilateral and ad hoc deals with specific provinces, none of which are entrenched in the constitution. This type of asymmetry is known as de facto asymmetry. The Canadian federation uses a combination of these, which make up its asymmetrical character.

== National examples ==
=== Canada ===
The Constitution of Canada is broadly symmetric but contains certain specific sections that apply only to certain provinces. In practice, a degree of asymmetry is created as a result of the evolution of the Canadian federal experiment, individual federal-provincial agreements, and judicial interpretation. Asymmetrical federalism has been much discussed as a formula for stability in Canada, meeting the aspirations of French-speaking Quebec for control over its cultural and social life without removing it from the national federation, where it coexists with nine largely English-speaking provinces.

The most prominent example of asymmetric federalism in Canada is the constitutional requirement that three Supreme Court justices must come from Quebec. The nine other provinces are each entitled to fair representation in the Supreme Court, but their entitlement is based on convention rather than enshrined in the constitution.

Another example of asymmetry in Canada can be found in the terms of the September 2004 federal-provincial-territorial agreement on health care and the financing thereof. The Government of Quebec supported the broader agreement but insisted on a separate communiqué in which it was specified, among other things, that Quebec will apply its own wait time reduction plan in accordance with the objectives, standards and criteria established by the relevant Quebec authorities; that the Government of Quebec will report to Quebecers on progress in achieving its objectives, and will use comparable indicators, mutually agreed to with other governments; and that funding made available by the Government of Canada will be used by the Government of Quebec to implement its own plan for renewing Quebec's health system.

For example, Quebec operates its own pension plan, while the other nine provinces are covered by the federal/provincial Canada Pension Plan. Quebec has extensive authority over employment and immigration issues within its borders, matters that are handled by the federal government in all the other provinces.

Such an arrangement has led to criticism in the English-speaking provinces, where there is fear that Quebec is enjoying favouritism in the federal system. It, however, provides a useful lever for those who want to decentralize the structure as a whole, transferring more powers from the centre to the provinces overall, a trend that dominated Canadian politics for decades.

=== Czechoslovakia ===
The Second Czechoslovak Republic (1938–1939) was divided into five lands, with the land of Slovakia given a higher degree of autonomy than the other lands, often regarded as a de facto federalist devolution. From 1945 to 1968, Czechoslovakia operated under an asymmetric federal model, and the Slovak National Council appointed a Chairman of the Board of Trustees, de facto the Prime Minister of Slovakia. In 1968 asymmetric federalism was officially abandoned, and the constitution was changed to a federal republic with the creation of the Slovak Socialist Republic and the Czech Socialist Republic with a new Czech National Council, but the ruling Communist Party of Czechoslovakia retained an asymmetrical partisan model with only a Communist Party of Slovakia and no Czech Communist Party until 1990.

=== Germany ===
The Basic Law, Germany's constitution since 1949, is broadly symmetric with some exceptions. Article 138 provides that changes to "rules governing the notarial profession" in a southern German state require the consent of the state legislatures. Article 141 exempts Bremen from the requirement that German schools provide religious education.

Historically, some states of the North German Confederation and the German Empire (1867–1918) had special rights by constitution. For example, the king of Prussia was always the German Emperor, and states such as Bavaria had the right to organize their own military and raise certain taxes on their own (Reservatrecht).

=== India ===
The Government of India (referred to as the Union Government or Central Government) was established by the Constitution of India, and is the governing authority of a federal union of 28 states and 8 union territories.

The governance of India is based on a tiered federal system, wherein the Constitution of India assigns the subjects on which each tier of government exercises powers.

Until 2019, Article 370 made special provisions for the state of Jammu and Kashmir as per its Instrument of Accession. Article 371-371J make special provisions for the states of Andhra Pradesh, Arunachal Pradesh, Assam, Gujarat, Goa, Karnataka, Mizoram, Manipur, Maharashtra, Nagaland, Sikkim, and Telangana.

=== Indonesia ===
According to the First Article of the Constitution of Indonesia, the country is a "unitary state in the form of a republic". However, out of the 38 provinces of Indonesia, nine currently hold the designation of "special region" (daerah khusus). These provinces are Aceh, Jakarta, Yogyakarta, West Papua, Southwest Papua, Papua, South Papua, Highland Papua, and Central Papua. Seven provinces gained special autonomy status due to ongoing or former conflict (the six Papuan provinces and Aceh), one due to historical reasons (Yogyakarta), and one due to capital city status (Jakarta).

The current form of special autonomy (de facto federalism) in Aceh was agreed as a condition of peace in the Helsinki Agreement of 2005, which ended the 30-year insurgency in Aceh. As part of the special autonomy status, Aceh was granted the constitutional right of appointing a Wali Nanggroe (lit. Head of State), which functions as a ceremonial guarantor of peace and Acehnese traditions. Furthermore, Aceh exercises Sharia law with the Aceh traditional system of government instead of using the unitary system the other provinces have. Aceh was also granted the rights over the participation of local Aceh parties in their provincial elections, unlike other provinces.

Jakarta is the capital city and, unlike other cities in Indonesia which were granted a second-tier of country subdivision or the same degree as a regency, exercises the autonomous power of a first-tier level of country subdivision. Unlike in other areas of Indonesia, wali kota (mayors) and bupati (regent) in Jakarta are appointed by the Governor of Jakarta instead of being directly elected.

Yogyakarta was granted special status over the exercise and involvement of the royal family of the Sultanate of Yogyakarta and the princely state of Kadipaten Pakualaman, where the Sultan of Jogjakarta rules the province as an unelected governor ex officio for life. Acting as his deputy is the Adipati of Pakualam, also ruling ex officio for life. The two rule as the executive leaders of Jogjakarta.

The six provinces in Papua were granted a special status over the exercise of legislative power. Papuan provinces have a separate upper house, the MRP (Majelis Rakyat Papua/Papuan People's Assembly). As an upper house, the MRP has consultative rights over provincial regulations and some budgetary rights, although it cannot block provincial parliament bills (perda). Officially non-partisan, MRP members are made up of three 'streams': traditional (adat) representatives, women representatives, and representatives of the three major religions in Papua: Protestantism, Catholicism, and Islam. Likewise, MRP members are elected by selected representatives of those 'streams' instead of through universal suffrage. The lower houses of all six provinces and municipal councils likewise are obliged to add onto their elected membership one-fourths additional 'special autonomy seats' (kursi otonomi khusus) members as representatives of traditional communities and women.

As a part of special autonomy arrangements, certain regions in Central Papua and Highland Papua uses the noken system for elections, whereby only village headmen (kepala kampung) vote on behalf of the whole village's voter population.

However, the status of Papuan autonomy has been criticized due to intervention from Jakarta. International human rights activists have called Papua a 'fake autonomous province' due to the lack of real autonomy in the field.

=== Italy ===
In Italy, which is a unitary state, five regions (namely Sardinia, Sicily, Trentino-Alto Adige/Südtirol, Aosta Valley and Friuli-Venezia Giulia) have been granted special status of autonomy. Their statutes are constitutional laws approved by the Italian Parliament, granting them relatively broad powers in relation to legislation and administration, but also significant financial autonomy. They keep between 60% (Friuli-Venezia Giulia) and 100% (Sicily) of all taxes and decide how to spend the revenues. These regions became autonomous in order to take into account that they host linguistic minorities (German-speaking in Trentino-Alto Adige/Südtirol, Arpitan-speaking in Aosta Valley, Friulian and Slovenian-speaking in Friuli-Venezia Giulia) or are geographically isolated (the two islands, but also Friuli-Venezia Giulia).

=== Malaysia ===
Malaysia is a federation of 13, formerly 14 states formed in 1963 by the merger of the independent Federation of Malaya and the formerly British colonies of Singapore, Sabah, and Sarawak.

Under the terms of the federation, Sabah and Sarawak are granted significant autonomy in excess of that exercised by the 11 Malayan states, most notably the control over immigration to these two states.

Singapore was a part of Malaysia until 1965. During its time as a state of Malaysia, Singapore enjoyed autonomy in setting labour and education policies.

=== Russia ===
The Russian Federation consists of 83 federal subjects, all equal in federal matters but enjoying six more or less different levels of autonomy.

A republic is the most autonomous subject. Each has its own constitution, has its own official language (alongside Russian, which is official throughout the federation) and is meant to be home to a specific ethnic minority. An autonomous okrug also has a substantial ethnic minority, but is not allowed to have its own constitution and official language. An oblast, a krai, and an autonomous oblast has subjects without a substantial ethnic minority, completely equal to an autonomous okrug with other rights. A federal city is a major city that functions as a separate region.

Previously, the Soviet Union often demonstrated traits of asymmetric federalism, including defining the Russian SFSR's constitution inside of the 1936 Soviet Constitution, subnational asymmetric federalism (especially within the Russian SFSR but also in other SSRs), and giving the Russian SFSR the most representation in the Supreme Soviet, particularly the Soviet of Nationalities, where each autonomous area of the Russian SFSR was granted additional representation. At the same time, Russian SFSR did not have its own Communist Party branch, whose First Secretaries de-facto served as a head of states of other Soviet Republics.

=== Spain ===
In Spain, which is either called an "imperfect federation" or a "federation in all but its name", the central government has granted different levels of autonomy to its substates, considerably more to the autonomous communities of Catalonia, the Basque Country, Valencia, Andalusia, Navarre and Galicia and considerably less to the others, out of respect for nationalist sentiment and rights these regions have enjoyed historically.

=== United Kingdom ===
In the United Kingdom, England has no self-government and is ruled directly by the British Parliament, but Northern Ireland, Scotland, and Wales have varying degrees of autonomy. However, many people, such as the Yorkshire Party, believe that asymmetrical devolution of powers (most notably to the Scottish Parliament and Welsh Parliament) is unfair, which causes the ongoing West Lothian question. The United Kingdom is a unitary state, not a federal one, according to its constitution, and the British Parliament still remains sovereign, though some groups such as the Federal Union seek to change this, and Winston Churchill was famously in favour of a British federation.

=== United States ===
Outside of the 50 states admitted to the Union, the United States holds sovereignty over a number of "unincorporated" territories. These territories, and the people on them, do not enjoy all constitutional rights by default.

Most of these are uninhabited islands claimed by the United States under the Guano Islands Act, with the exception of Palmyra Atoll; formerly part of the Territory of Hawaii, and Wake Island, where President William McKinley gave direct orders to take possession of the unclaimed island.

Of the five inhabited islands, only one is "unorganized" and "unincorporated": American Samoa. This status means that, de jure, the island is under the direct administration of the Department of the Interior, though it is de facto incorporated, since the Department of the Interior approved a constitution, and a locally elected governor and legislature. Though it excludes American Samoans from birthright citizenship, it enables American Samoa to maintain its own laws that may conflict with federal U.S. case law and constitutional law, such as discriminatory collective land ownership, independent immigration law, or its ban on performing (but not recognizing) same-sex marriages.

On the other end of the spectrum, Puerto Rico is an "organized", and de jure "unincorporated", despite numerous acts of Congress extending so much federal law to Puerto Rico that in 2008, District Judge Gustavo Gelpí argued that, collectively, that these "repeated congressional annexations" have amounted to incorporating Puerto Rico, and that "to hold otherwise, would amount to the court blindfolding itself to continue permitting Congress per secula seculorum to switch on and off the Constitution". As of a 2024 referendum, the majority of Puerto Ricans desire U.S. statehood.
