= United States v. American Tobacco Co. =

- Supreme Court of the United States

Argued January 3–6, 1910 Reargued January 9–12, 1911 Decided May 29, 1911
- Full case name: United States v. American Tobacco Company
- Citations: 221 U.S. 106 (more) 31 S. Ct. 632; 55 L. Ed. 663

Case history
- Prior: Appeals from the Circuit Court of the United States for the Southern District of New York

Holding
- The combination in this case is one in restraint of trade and an attempt to monopolize the business of tobacco in interstate commerce within the prohibitions of the Sherman Antitrust Act.

Court membership
- Chief Justice Edward D. White Associate Justices John M. Harlan · Joseph McKenna; Oliver W. Holmes Jr. · William R. Day; Horace H. Lurton · Charles E. Hughes; Willis Van Devanter · Joseph R. Lamar

Case opinions
- Majority: White, joined by McKenna, Holmes, Day, Lurton, Hughes, Van Devanter, Lamar
- Concur/dissent: Harlan

Laws applied
- Sherman Antitrust Act

United States v. American Tobacco Company, 221 U.S. 106 (1911), was a decision by the Supreme Court of the United States, which held that the combination in this case is one in restraint of trade and an attempt to monopolize the business of tobacco in interstate commerce within the prohibitions of the Sherman Antitrust Act of 1890. As a result, the American Tobacco Company was split into four competitors.

== Facts ==
The Sherman Antitrust Act was created in 1890, and in 1907 the American Tobacco Company was indicted in violation of it. In 1908 when the Department of Justice filed suit against the company, sixty-five companies and twenty-nine individuals were named in the suit. The Supreme Court ordered the company to dissolve in 1911 on the same day that it ordered the Standard Oil Trust to dissolve.

== Judgment ==
The ruling in United States v. American Tobacco Co. stated that the combination of the tobacco companies "in and of itself, as well as each and all of the elements composing it whether corporate or individual, whether considered collectively or separately [was] in restraint of trade and an attempt to monopolize, and a monopolization within the first and second sections of the Anti-Trust Act."

== Significance ==
In order to promote market competition, four firms were created from the American Tobacco Company's assets: American Tobacco Company, R. J. Reynolds, Liggett & Myers, and Lorillard. The monopoly became an oligopoly.

In 1938 Thurman Arnold in the United States Department of Justice Antitrust Division began hosting hearings in the Temporary National Economic Committee to determine whether the four companies were further engaged together in monopolistic practices. That committee found that 3 of the 4 companies were guilty of the charges presented to the court.

== See also ==
- List of United States Supreme Court cases, volume 221
- Standard Oil Co. of New Jersey v. United States (1911)
