= Standard Oil Co. of New Jersey v. United States =

1911 U.S. Supreme Court case

- Supreme Court of the United States

Argued March 14–16, 1910 Reargued January 12–17, 1911 Decided May 15, 1911
- Full case name: The Standard Oil Company of New Jersey, et al. v. The United States
- Citations: 221 U.S. 1 (more) 31 S. Ct. 502; 55 L. Ed. 619; 1911 U.S. LEXIS 1725

Case history
- Prior: United States v. Standard Oil Co. of New Jersey, 173 F. 177 (C.C.E.D. Mo. 1909)

Holding
- The Standard Oil Company conspired to restrain the trade and commerce in petroleum, and to monopolize the commerce in petroleum, in violation of the Sherman Act, and was split into many smaller companies. Several individuals, including John D. Rockefeller, were fined.

Court membership
- Chief Justice Edward D. White Associate Justices John M. Harlan · Joseph McKenna; Oliver W. Holmes Jr. · William R. Day; Horace H. Lurton · Charles E. Hughes; Willis Van Devanter · Joseph R. Lamar

Case opinions
- Majority: White, joined by McKenna, Holmes, Day, Lurton, Hughes, Van Devanter, Lamar
- Concur/dissent: Harlan

Laws applied
- Sherman Antitrust Act

Standard Oil Co. of New Jersey v. United States, 221 U.S. 1 (1911), was a landmark U.S. Supreme Court decision that ruled that John D. Rockefeller's petroleum conglomerate Standard Oil had illegally monopolized the American petroleum industry and ordered the company to break itself up. The decision also held, however, that U.S. antitrust law bans only "unreasonable" restraints on trade, an interpretation that came to be known as the "rule of reason".

== History ==
Over the course of the 1870s, the Standard Oil Company of Ohio acquired a monopoly on oil refining in the United States. The Cleveland-based company was already among the largest refiners in the United States at the start of the decade, but it controlled only about four percent of the market. Under the leadership of founder John D. Rockefeller, Standard Oil began acquiring other refineries in Cleveland, which was a center of the U.S. refining industry. By early 1872, it owned nearly every refinery in the city and controlled roughly 25 percent of the American oil refining market. Under Rockefeller's direction, Standard Oil then began acquiring refining companies in other cities, and by 1879 it controlled more than 90 percent of the market.

By the 1880s, Standard Oil was using its large market share of refining capacity to begin integrating backward into oil exploration and crude oil distribution and forward into retail distribution of its refined products to stores and, eventually, service stations throughout the United States. Standard Oil allegedly used its size and clout to undercut competitors in a number of ways that were considered "anti-competitive," including underpricing and threats to suppliers and distributors who did business with Standard's competitors.

In November 1906, the Justice Department sued Standard Oil of New Jersey for violating the Sherman Act. The action was brought under the Expediting Act in the United States circuit court for the Eastern District of Missouri. After a 15-month-long trial, the court issued its decree of dissolution in November 1909 and its opinion in December 1909.

The main issue before the Supreme Court was whether it was within the power of Congress to prevent one company from acquiring numerous others through means that might have been considered legal in common law, but still posed a significant constraint on competition by mere virtue of their size and market power, as implied by the Antitrust Act.

== Judgment ==
As in the case against American Tobacco, which was decided the same day, the Court concluded that these facts were within the power of Congress to regulate under the Commerce Clause. The Court recognized that "taken literally," the term "restraint of trade" could refer to any number of normal or usual contracts that do not harm the public. The Court embarked on a lengthy exegesis of English authorities relevant to the meaning of the term "restraint of trade." Based on this review, the Court concluded that the term "restraint of trade" had come to refer to a contract that resulted in "monopoly or its consequences." The Court identified three such consequences: higher prices, reduced output, and reduced quality.

The Court concluded that a contract offended the Sherman Act only if the contract restrained trade "unduly"—that is if the contract resulted in one of the three consequences of monopoly that the Court identified. A broader meaning, the Court suggested, would ban normal and usual contracts, and would thus infringe liberty of contract. The Court endorsed the rule of reason enunciated by William Howard Taft in Addyston Pipe and Steel Company v. United States (1899), written when Taft had been Chief Judge of the United States Court of Appeals for the Sixth Circuit. The Court concluded, however, that the behavior of the Standard Oil Company went beyond the limitations of this rule.

=== Concurrence ===
Justice John Marshall Harlan concurred with the result, but dissented against adopting a "rule of reason". It departed from precedent that the Sherman Act banned any contract that restrained trade "directly." He said the following:

I concur in holding that the Standard Oil Company of New Jersey and its subsidiary companies constitute a combination in restraint of interstate commerce and that they have attempted to monopolize and have monopolized parts of such commerce,—all in violation of what is known as the anti-trust act of 1890. 26 Stat. at L. 209, chap. 647, U. S. Comp. Stat. 1901, p. 3200. The evidence in this case overwhelmingly sustained that view and led the circuit court, by its final decree, to order the dissolution of the New Jersey corporation and the discontinuance of the illegal combination between that corporation and its subsidiary companies.

In my judgment, the decree below should have been affirmed without qualification. But the court, while affirming the decree, directs some modifications in respect of what it characterizes as 'minor matters.' It is to be apprehended that those modifications may prove to be mischievous. In saying this, I have particularly in view the statement in the opinion that 'it does not necessarily follow because an illegal restraint of trade or an attempt to monopolize or a monopolization resulted from the combination and the transfer of the stocks of the subsidiary corporations to the New Jersey corporation that a like restraint of trade or attempt to monopolize or monopolization would necessarily arise from agreements between one or more of the subsidiary corporations after the transfer of the stock by the New Jersey corporation.' Taking this language, in connection with other parts of the opinion, the subsidiary companies are thus, in effect, informed—unwisely, I think—that although the New Jersey corporation, being and illegal combination, must go out of existence, they may join in an agreement to restrain commerce among the states if such restraint be not 'undue.'

In order that my objections to certain parts of the court's opinion may distinctly appear, I must state the circumstances under which Congress passed the anti-trust act, and trace the course of judicial decisions as to its meaning and scope. This is the more necessary because the court by its decision, when interpreted by the language of its opinion, has not only upset the long-settled interpretation of the act but has usurped the constitutional functions of the legislative branch of the government. With all due respect for the opinions of others, I feel bound to say that what the court has said may well cause some alarm for the integrity of our institutions. Let us see how the matter stands.

All who recall the condition of the country in 1890 will remember that there was everywhere, among the people generally, a deep feeling of unrest. The nation had been rid of human slavery, fortunately, as all now feel,—but the conviction was universal that the country was in real danger from another kind of slavery sought to be fastened on the American people; namely, the slavery that would result from aggregations of capital in the hands of a few individuals and corporations controlling, for their own profit and advantage exclusively, the entire business of the country, including the production and sale of the necessaries of life. Such a danger was thought to be then imminent, and all felt that it must be met firmly and by such statutory regulations as would adequately protect the people against oppression and wrong. Congress, therefore, took up the matter and gave the whole subject the fullest consideration. All agreed that the national government could not, by legislation, regulate the domestic trade carried on wholly within the several states; for power to regulate such trade remained with, because never surrendered by, the states. But, under authority expressly granted to it by the Constitution, Congress could regulate commerce among the several states and with foreign states. Its authority to regulate such commerce was and is paramount, due force being given to other provisions of the fundamental law, devised by the fathers for the safety of the government and for the protection and security of the essential rights inhering in life, liberty, and property.

Guided by these considerations, and to the end that the people, so far as interstate commerce was concerned, might not be dominated by vast combinations and monopolies, having power to advance their own selfish ends, regardless of the general interests and welfare, Congress passed the anti-trust act of 1890...

[... Harlan J quoted from United States v. Trans-Missouri Freight Association, 166 U.S. 290 (1897) and continued...]

I have made these extended extracts from the opinion of the court in the Trans-Missouri Freight Case in order to show beyond question that the point was there urged by counsel that the anti-trust act condemned only contracts, combinations, trusts, and conspiracies that were in unreasonable restraint of interstate commerce and that the court in clear and decisive language met that point. It adjudged that Congress had in unequivocal words declared that 'every contract, combination in the form of trust or otherwise, or conspiracy, in restraint of commerce among the several states,' shall be illegal, and that no distinction, so far as interstate commerce was concerned, was to be tolerated between restraints of such commerce as were undue or unreasonable, and restraints that were due or reasonable. With full knowledge of the then condition of the country and of its business, Congress determined to meet, and did meet, the situation by an absolute, statutory prohibition of 'every contract, combination in the form of trusts or otherwise, in restraint of trade or commerce.' Still more; in response to the suggestion by able counsel that Congress intended only to strike down such contracts, combinations, and monopolies as unreasonably restrained interstate commerce, this court, in words too clear to be misunderstood, said that to so hold was 'to read into the act by way of judicial legislation, an exception not placed there by the lawmaking branch of the government.' 'This,' the court said, as we have seen, 'we cannot and ought not to do.'

— Justice John Marshall Harlan

== Significance ==
The Standard Oil case resulted in the breakup of Standard Oil into 43 separate companies. Many of these have since recombined; the largest present direct descendants of Standard Oil are ExxonMobil (Standard Oil of New Jersey and Standard Oil of New York) and Chevron (Standard Oil of California). Some Standard Oil descendants merged into other companies, particularly BP, which acquired/merged with Standard Oil of Ohio and Amoco.

While some scholars have agreed with Justice Harlan's characterization of prior case law, others have agreed with William Howard Taft, who concluded that despite its different verbal formulation, Standard Oil's "rule of reason" was entirely consistent with prior case law.

== See also ==
- US antitrust law
- List of United States Supreme Court cases, volume 221
