= Symmetric federalism =

Type of federal government

Symmetric federalism refers to a federal system of government in which each constituent state to the federation possess equal powers. In a symmetric federalism no distinction is made between constituent states. This is in contrast to asymmetric federalism, where a distinction is made between constituent states.

== Examples ==
=== Australia ===
Australia is a symmetric federation, as each of the 6 states are given equal levels of autonomy and representation in the Parliament, aside from differences in their representation in the House of Representatives that are due to their different populations. Australia also has territories, which are autonomous divisions with devolved powers, but are subordinate to the federal government and organized in varying ways.

=== United States ===
The United States is a symmetric federation, as each of the 50 states in the Union has the same standing and powers under the United States Constitution. This was affirmed in Coyle v. Smith when the U.S. Supreme Court declared a provision of the Oklahoma Enabling Act which required the State capital be located in Guthrie, Oklahoma until at least 1913, as being unconstitutional. However, the U.S. has a number of insular areas directly under the control of the U.S. federal government, with various degrees of autonomy. The District of Columbia is not an insular area, but it is also directly controlled by the federal government with limited autonomy.
