= United States v. Johnson (1911) =

- Supreme Court of the United States

Argued April 13, 1911 Decided May 29, 1911
- Full case name: United States v. Johnson
- Citations: 221 U.S. 488 (more) 31 S. Ct. 627; 55 L. Ed. 823

Holding
- The term "misbranded" and the phrase defining what amounts to misbranding in § 8 of the Pure Food and Drug Act are aimed at false statements as to identity of the article, possibly including strength, quality and purity, dealt with in § 7 of the act, and not at statements as to curative effect. A statement on the labels of bottles of medicine that the contents are effective as a cure for cancer, even if misleading, is not covered by the statute.

Court membership
- Chief Justice Edward D. White Associate Justices John M. Harlan · Joseph McKenna; Oliver W. Holmes Jr. · William R. Day; Horace H. Lurton · Charles E. Hughes; Willis Van Devanter · Joseph R. Lamar

Case opinions
- Majority: Holmes, joined by White, McKenna, Lurton, Van Devanter, Lamar
- Dissent: Hughes, joined by Harlan, Day

Laws applied
- Pure Food and Drug Act

In United States v. Johnson, 221 U.S. 488 (1911), the United States Supreme Court ruled that the misbranding provisions of the Pure Food and Drug Act of 1906 did not pertain to false curative or therapeutic statements but only false statements as to the identity of the drug.

In 1912, Congress responded with the Sherley Amendments, which addressed the perceived lack of enforcement of fraud related to therapeutic claims. The Act was amended to prohibit false and fraudulent claims of health benefits but enforcement under the amendment required proof of fraudulent intent, a difficult standard. The misbranding amendment required a curative or therapeutic product to bear a label with a quantity or proportion statement for specified narcotic substances:

any alcohol, morphine, opium, cocaine, heroin, alpha or beta eucaine, chloroform, cannabis indica, chloral hydrate, or acetanilide or any derivative or preparation of any such substances
