= Equal footing =

Equality of U.S. states

The equal footing doctrine, also known as equality of the states, is the principle in United States constitutional law that all states admitted to the Union under the Constitution since 1789 enter on equal footing with the 13 states already in the Union at that time. The Constitution grants to Congress the power to admit new states in Article IV, Section 3, Clause 1, which states:

New States may be admitted by the Congress into this Union; but no new State shall be formed or erected within the Jurisdiction of any other State; nor any State be formed by the Junction of two or more States, or Parts of States, without the Consent of the Legislatures of the States concerned as well as of the Congress.

In each act of admission since that of Tennessee in 1796, Congress has specified that the new state joins the Union "on an equal footing with the original States in all respects whatever". Previously, when Vermont was admitted in 1791, its act of admission said Vermont was to be "a new and entire member" of the United States.

== Background ==
At the 1787 Constitutional Convention, a proposal to include the phrase, "new States shall be admitted on the same terms with the original States", was defeated. It was feared that the political power of future new western states would eventually overwhelm that of the established eastern states. Once the new Constitution went into effect, however, Congress admitted Vermont and Kentucky on equal terms and thereafter formalized the condition in its acts of admission for subsequent states, declaring that the new state enters "on an equal footing with the original States in all respects whatever." Thus the Congress, utilizing the discretion allowed by the framers, adopted a policy of equal status for all newly admitted states. With the growth of states' rights advocacy during the antebellum period, the Supreme Court asserted, in Lessee of Pollard v. Hagan (1845), that the Constitution mandated admission of new states on the basis of equality.

== Cases ==
=== Coyle v. Smith ===
In Coyle v. Smith, 221 U.S. 559 (1911), the Supreme Court ruled that if Congress mandates a unique limitation be put in a prospective constitution of a state, even if its residents agree, the unique mandate is not enforceable.

==== Facts ====
On December 29, 1910, the State of Oklahoma enacted a statute, which removed the state capital from Guthrie to Oklahoma City. W.H. Coyle, the owner of large property interests in Guthrie, sued the state of Oklahoma and argued that the move was performed in violation of the state constitution's acceptance of the terms of the 1906 Oklahoma Enabling Act, which mandated the capital to be in Guthrie until 1913.

==== Supreme Court Analysis ====
The Court noted that the power given to Congress by Article IV, Section 3, of the US Constitution is to admit new states to the Union and relates only to such states as are equal to each other in power and dignity and competency to exert the residuum of sovereignty not delegated to the federal government.

The Supreme Court held that preventing from Oklahoma its right to locate the state's own seat of government deprived it of powers that all other states of the Union enjoyed, which thus violated the traditional constitutional principle for all new states to be admitted "on an equal footing with the original states." As a result, the provision of the enabling act that temporarily restricted Oklahoma's right to determine its seat of government was unconstitutional.

=== United States v. Holt State Bank ===
In United States v. Holt State Bank, 270 U.S. 49 (1926), the Supreme Court ruled that the equal footing doctrine applied to water rights. The Supreme Court rejected a claim by the Red Lake Indian Reservation of Minnesota that it had rights to Mud Lake and other navigable waters within the reservation by virtue of the tribe's aboriginal status.

==== Facts ====
In general, lands underlying navigable waters within a state belong to the state in its sovereign capacity. The state may use and dispose them subject to the paramount power of Congress to control such waters for the purposes of navigation in interstate and foreign commerce.

If the United States, after acquiring the territory and before the creation of the state, has granted rights to land, which otherwise would have passed to the state, to a third party, by virtue of its admission to the Union, they remain with the third party.

However, disposals by the United States during the territorial period of lands under navigable water should not be regarded as intended unless there was a definite declaration by contract, statute, or other similar action.

At the time of Minnesota's admission as a state, Mud Lake and other much larger navigable waters within its limits were included in the Red Lake Indian Reservation. The Chippewas Tribe ceded to the United States its right of occupancy of the surrounding lands, which left the Red Lake Reservation as a remainder of their original aboriginal territory. The area was recognized as a reservation, but it was never formally set apart as such.

==== Supreme Court Analysis ====
The State of Minnesota was admitted into the Union in 1858, 11 Stat. 285, c. 31. Under the constitutional principle of equality among the several states, the title to the bed of Mud Lake then passed to the state if the lake was navigable, and the bed had not already been disposed of by the United States. Navigability does not depend on the particular mode used or an absence of occasional difficulties in navigation. It depends on the stream being, in its natural and ordinary condition, one that affords a channel for useful commerce.

== See also ==
- Pollard v. Hagan, 44 U.S. (3 How.) 212, 223 (1845)
- Idaho v. United States, 533 U.S. 262 (2001)
- Symmetric federalism
