= List of United States Supreme Court cases, volume 221 =

Supreme Court of the United States
- Interactive map of Supreme Court of the United States
- 38°53′26″N 77°00′16″W
- Established: March 4, 1789; 236 years ago
- Location: Washington, D.C.
- Coordinates: 38°53′26″N 77°00′16″W
- Composition method: Presidential nomination with Senate confirmation
- Authorised by: Constitution of the United States, Art. III, § 1
- Judge term length: life tenure, subject to impeachment and removal
- Number of positions: 9 (by statute)
- Website: supremecourt.gov

This is a list of cases reported in volume 221 of United States Reports, decided by the Supreme Court of the United States in 1911.

== Justices of the Supreme Court at the time of volume 221 U.S. ==
The Supreme Court is established by Article III, Section 1 of the Constitution of the United States, which says: "The judicial Power of the United States, shall be vested in one supreme Court . . .". The size of the Court is not specified; the Constitution leaves it to Congress to set the number of justices. Under the Judiciary Act of 1789 Congress originally fixed the number of justices at six (one chief justice and five associate justices). Since 1789 Congress has varied the size of the Court from six to seven, nine, ten, and back to nine justices (always including one chief justice).

When the cases in volume 221 were decided the Court comprised the following nine members:

Portrait	Justice	Office	Home State	Succeeded	Date confirmed by the Senate (Vote)	Tenure on Supreme Court
	Edward Douglass White	Chief Justice	Louisiana	Melville Fuller	December 12, 1910 (Acclamation)	December 19, 1910 – May 19, 1921 (Died)
	John Marshall Harlan	Associate Justice	Kentucky	David Davis	November 29, 1877 (Acclamation)	December 10, 1877 – October 14, 1911 (Died)
	Joseph McKenna	Associate Justice	California	Stephen Johnson Field	January 21, 1898 (Acclamation)	January 26, 1898 – January 5, 1925 (Retired)
	Oliver Wendell Holmes Jr.	Associate Justice	Massachusetts	Horace Gray	December 4, 1902 (Acclamation)	December 8, 1902 – January 12, 1932 (Retired)
	William R. Day	Associate Justice	Ohio	George Shiras Jr.	February 23, 1903 (Acclamation)	March 2, 1903 – November 13, 1922 (Retired)
	Horace Harmon Lurton	Associate Justice	Tennessee	Rufus W. Peckham	December 20, 1909 (Acclamation)	January 3, 1910 – July 12, 1914 (Died)
	Charles Evans Hughes	Associate Justice	New York	David Josiah Brewer	May 2, 1910 (Acclamation)	October 10, 1910 – June 10, 1916 (Resigned)
	Willis Van Devanter	Associate Justice	Wyoming	Edward Douglass White (as Associate Justice)	December 15, 1910 (Acclamation)	January 3, 1911 – June 2, 1937 (Retired)
	Joseph Rucker Lamar	Associate Justice	Georgia	William Henry Moody	December 15, 1910 (Acclamation)	January 3, 1911 – January 2, 1916 (Died)

== Notable Cases in 221 U.S. ==
=== Standard Oil Co. v. United States and United States v. American Tobacco Co. ===
Standard Oil Co. v. United States, 221 U.S. 1 (1911), and United States v. American Tobacco Co., 221 U.S. 106 (1911), are a pair of major antitrust decisions by the Supreme Court. In Standard Oil the Court found the company guilty of monopolizing the petroleum industry through a series of abusive and anticompetitive actions. The decision resulted in the breakup of Standard Oil into 34 separate companies. (Many of these have since recombined, particularly into ExxonMobil.) The Court in American Tobacco held the combination in that case was in restraint of trade and an attempt to monopolize the business of tobacco in interstate commerce within the prohibitions of the Sherman Antitrust Act of 1890. As a result, the American Tobacco Company was split into four competitors.

== Citation style ==
Under the Judiciary Act of 1789 the federal court structure at the time comprised District Courts, which had general trial jurisdiction; Circuit Courts, which had mixed trial and appellate (from the US District Courts) jurisdiction; and the United States Supreme Court, which had appellate jurisdiction over the federal District and Circuit courts—and for certain issues over state courts. The Supreme Court also had limited original jurisdiction (i.e., in which cases could be filed directly with the Supreme Court without first having been heard by a lower federal or state court). There were one or more federal District Courts and/or Circuit Courts in each state, territory, or other geographical region.

The Judiciary Act of 1891 created the United States Courts of Appeals and reassigned the jurisdiction of most routine appeals from the district and circuit courts to these appellate courts. The Act created nine new courts that were originally known as the "United States Circuit Courts of Appeals." The new courts had jurisdiction over most appeals of lower court decisions. The Supreme Court could review either legal issues that a court of appeals certified or decisions of court of appeals by writ of certiorari.

Bluebook citation style is used for case names, citations, and jurisdictions.

- "# Cir." = United States Court of Appeals
  - e.g., "3d Cir." = United States Court of Appeals for the Third Circuit
- "C.C.D." = United States Circuit Court for the District of . . .
  - e.g.,"C.C.D.N.J." = United States Circuit Court for the District of New Jersey
- "D." = United States District Court for the District of . . .
  - e.g.,"D. Mass." = United States District Court for the District of Massachusetts
- "E." = Eastern; "M." = Middle; "N." = Northern; "S." = Southern; "W." = Western
  - e.g.,"C.C.S.D.N.Y." = United States Circuit Court for the Southern District of New York
  - e.g.,"M.D. Ala." = United States District Court for the Middle District of Alabama
- "Ct. Cl." = United States Court of Claims
- The abbreviation of a state's name alone indicates the highest appellate court in that state's judiciary at the time.
  - e.g.,"Pa." = Supreme Court of Pennsylvania
  - e.g.,"Me." = Supreme Judicial Court of Maine

== List of cases in volume 221 U.S. ==
Case Name	Page and year	Opinion of the Court	Concurring opinion(s)	Dissenting opinion(s)	Lower Court	Disposition
Standard Oil Company of New Jersey v. United States	1 (1911)	White	Harlan	Harlan	C.C.E.D. Mo.	affirmed
United States v. American Tobacco Company	106 (1911)	White	Harlan	Harlan	C.C.S.D.N.Y.	reversed
Hannibal Bridge Company v. United States	194 (1911)	Harlan	none	none	E.D. Mo.	affirmed
Northern Pacific Railroad Company v. Trodick	208 (1911)	Harlan	none	none	9th Cir.	affirmed
United States v. Hammers	220 (1911)	McKenna	none	none	S.D. Cal.	reversed
West v. Kansas Natural Gas Company	229 (1911)	McKenna	none	none	C.C.E.D. Okla.	affirmed
Jacobs v. Beecham	263 (1911)	Holmes	none	none	2d Cir.	affirmed
In re Harris	274 (1911)	Holmes	none	none	2d Cir.	certification
Strassheim v. Daily	280 (1911)	Holmes	none	none	N.D. Ill.	reversed
Tiger v. Western Investment Company	286 (1911)	Day	none	none	Okla.	reversed
Hallowell v. United States	317 (1911)	Day	none	none	8th Cir.	certification
Dowdell v. United States	325 (1911)	Day	none	none	Phil.	affirmed
Merillat v. Hensey	333 (1911)	Lurton	none	none	D.C. Cir.	affirmed
Liverpool and London and Globe Insurance Company v. Board of Assessors for the Parish of Orleans	346 (1911)	Hughes	none	none	La.	affirmed
Orient Insurance Company v. Board of Assessors for the Parish of Orleans	358 (1911)	Hughes	none	none	La.	affirmed
Wilson v. United States	361 (1911)	Hughes	none	McKenna	C.C.S.D.N.Y.	affirmed
Dreier v. United States	394 (1911)	Hughes	none	none	C.C.S.D.N.Y.	affirmed
Grand Trunk Western Railroad Company v. Indiana Railroad Commission	400 (1911)	VanDevanter	none	none	Ind. Ct. App.	affirmed
Sargent v. Herrick	404 (1911)	VanDevanter	none	none	Iowa	reversed
Texas and New Orleans Railroad Company v. Miller	408 (1911)	VanDevanter	none	none	Tex. Civ. App.	affirmed
Texas and New Orleans Railroad Company v. Gross	417 (1911)	VanDevanter	none	none	Tex. Civ. App.	affirmed
Gompers v. Bucks Stove and Range Company	418 (1911)	Lamar	none	none	D.C. Cir.	reversed
Montello Salt Company v. Utah	452 (1911)	McKenna	none	none	Utah	reversed
Fifth Avenue Coach Company v. City of New York	467 (1911)	McKenna	none	none	N.Y. Sup. Ct.	affirmed
Bean v. Morris	485 (1911)	Holmes	none	none	9th Cir.	affirmed
United States v. Johnson	488 (1911)	Holmes	none	Hughes	W.D. Mo.	affirmed
Glucksman v. Henkel	508 (1911)	Holmes	none	none	C.C.S.D.N.Y.	affirmed
Apsey v. Kimball	514 (1911)	Day	none	none	multiple	affirmed
Appleby v. City of Buffalo	524 (1911)	Day	none	none	N.Y. Sup. Ct.	affirmed
Carpenter v. Winn	533 (1911)	Lurton	none	none	2d Cir.	reversed
Briscoe v. Rudolph	547 (1911)	Lurton	none	none	D.C. Cir.	affirmed
Lewis v. Luckett	554 (1911)	Lurton	none	none	D.C. Cir.	affirmed
Coyle v. Smith	559 (1911)	Lurton	none	none	Okla.	affirmed
Baglin v. Cusenier Company	580 (1911)	Hughes	none	none	2d Cir.	reversed
A non-trademarkable geographic indicator is not to be confused with other designations of origin (e.g., town in France vs. monastic order); The liquidator of physical assets has no claims to foreign trademarks; Abandonment requires evidence of practical abandonment and intent to abandon.
American Lithographic Company v. Werckmeister	603 (1911)	Hughes	none	none	2d Cir.	affirmed
Baltimore and Ohio Railroad Company v. Interstate Commerce Commission	612 (1911)	Hughes	none	none	C.C.D. Md.	affirmed
Jover y Costas v. Philippines	623 (1911)	VanDevanter	none	none	Phil.	reversed
Hopkins v. Clemson College	636 (1911)	Lamar	none	none	S.C.	reversed
Faber v. United States	649 (1911)	Lamar	none	none	C.C.S.D.N.Y.	affirmed
Provident Institution for Savings v. Malone	660 (1911)	Lamar	none	none	Mass.	affirmed

== See also ==
- Certificate of division
