= Weaver v. Palmer Bros. Co. =

Weaver v. Palmer Brothers Company
- Supreme Court of the United States

Argued December 11, 1925 Decided March 8, 1926
- Full case name: Weaver v. Palmer Brothers Company
- Citations: 270 U.S. 402 (more) 46 S. Ct. 320; 70 L. Ed. 654; 1926 U.S. LEXIS 420

Court membership
- Chief Justice William H. Taft Associate Justices Oliver W. Holmes Jr. · Willis Van Devanter; James C. McReynolds · Louis Brandeis; George Sutherland · Pierce Butler; Edward T. Sanford · Harlan F. Stone

Case opinions
- Majority: Butler, joined by Taft, Van Devanter, McReynolds, Sutherland, Sanford
- Dissent: Holmes, joined by Brandeis, Stone

Laws applied
- U.S. Const. amend. XIV

Weaver v. Palmer Brothers Company, 270 U.S. 402 (1926), was a United States Supreme Court case in which the Court struck down a public health and safety regulation as a violation of due process under the Fourteenth Amendment.

== Background ==
A statute banned the use of cut up fabrics in the manufacturing of bedding based on concerns over public health. The statute did allow for the use of other second hand fabrics after sterilization.

== Opinion of the Court ==
Because the banned cut up fabrics could be rendered safe by the same process of sterilization, the Court held the statute to be an arbitrary infringement on business that violated the due process clause of the Fourteenth Amendment.
