= Federacy =

Form of government similar to asymmetric federalism

A federacy is a form of government where one or several substate units enjoy considerably more independence than the majority of the substate units. To some extent, such an arrangement can be considered to be similar to asymmetric federalism.

== Description ==
A federacy is a form of government with features of both a federation and unitary state. In a federacy, at least one of the constituent parts of the state is autonomous, while the other constituent parts are either not autonomous or comparatively less autonomous. An example of such an arrangement is Finland, where Åland, which has the status of autonomous province, has considerably more autonomy than the other provinces. The autonomous constituent part enjoys a degree of independence as though it was part of federation, while the other constituent parts are as independent as subunits in a unitary state. This autonomy is guaranteed in the country's constitution. The autonomous subunits are often former colonial possessions or are home to a different ethnic group from the rest of the country. These autonomous subunits often have a special status in international relations.

== Federacies ==
Several states are federacies. The exact autonomy of the subunits differs from country to country.

=== Antigua and Barbuda ===
Barbuda is autonomous within Antigua and Barbuda.

=== Australia and Norfolk Island ===
Norfolk Island self-government was revoked by the Australian Federal Government in 2015. Its laws were subsumed into the laws of the Australian federal government and be subordinate to them. On 1 July 2016, the federal government increased federal regulations so that federal laws would also apply to Norfolk Island and to make it semi-autonomous. Since then, opposition by several organizations have protested these actions to the United Nations to include the island on its list of "non-self-governing territories".

=== Azerbaijan and Nakhchivan ===
Nakhchivan is an autonomous part of Azerbaijan.

=== China, Hong Kong and Macau ===
From 1997 to 2020, the relationship between China and the special administrative region of Hong Kong can be viewed as a federacy. This is no longer the case after the passage of the 2020 Hong Kong national security law. The same can be said of China's relationship with the special administrative region of Macau from 1999 to 2009, when the Macau National Security Law was enacted.

The Hong Kong Basic Law guarantees Hong Kong a high degree of autonomy under Chinese rule, with the exception of foreign affairs and defence which remains the purview of the Central People's Government.

Four agencies of the central government operate in Hong Kong. The Office of the Commissioner of the Ministry of Foreign Affairs was established under Article 13 of the Basic Law and began operating after the handover. The Liaison Office of the Central People's Government replaced in 2000 the Hong Kong branch of Xinhua News Agency, which served as the de facto diplomatic mission of China to Hong Kong since 1947. The Hong Kong Garrison of the People's Liberation Army began operating after the handover. The Office for Safeguarding National Security was established in June 2020 under the Hong Kong National Security Law.

Article 22 states that "no department of the Central People's Government and no province, autonomous region, or municipality directly under the Central Government may interfere in the affairs which the Hong Kong Special Administrative Region administers on its own in accordance with this Law".

In April 2020, the provision sparked a debate after the Liaison Office and the Hong Kong and Macao Affairs Office criticised pro-democratic legislators for delaying the election of the chairperson of the Legislative Council House Committee. Pro-democratic legislators said the offices violated Article 22 by commenting on the election of a chairperson in the local legislature. In response, the Liaison Office said both itself and the Hong Kong and Macao Affairs Office are not subject to Article 22 because they were authorised by central authorities to specialize in handling Hong Kong affairs and not what are commonly meant by "departments under the Central People’s Government".

Zhang Xiaoming has also said the Office of the National Security Commissioner is not subject to the restrictions in Article 22.

Except the Basic Law and the Constitution, national laws are not enforced in Hong Kong unless they are listed in Annex III and applied by local promulgation or legislation. When national laws are enacted locally by the Legislative Council, the local version adapts to the context of Hong Kong for the national law to have full effect. The NPCSC can amend legislation included in Annex III after consulting its Basic Law Committee and the Hong Kong government. Laws in Annex III must be those related to foreign affairs, national defence or matters not within Hong Kong's autonomy.

As of June 2020, Annex III includes laws on the designation of capital, national flag and anthem, territorial claims, nationality, diplomatic privileges and immunity, garrisoning of the People's Liberation Army and crimes involving national security. In May 2020, the National People's Congress announced that the NPCSC would enact a national security law tailored for Hong Kong in response to the 2019–2020 Hong Kong protests. The law was added to Annex III and promulgated without being passed in the Legislative Council.

National laws can be applied if they only affect an area in Hong Kong. In 2018, the Hong Kong West Kowloon station of the Guangzhou–Shenzhen–Hong Kong Express Rail Link was completed to include a section where mainland Chinese officials are allowed to exercise Chinese laws, an arrangement that intended to reduce the time needed for immigration. The effectiveness of Chinese law inside Hong Kong territory was challenged in the same year in the Court of First Instance. The court ruled that the Basic Law is a flexible constitution and as such can be interpreted for the needs of economic integration; the arrangement of having mainland Chinese laws in Hong Kong for the purposes of customs, immigration and quarantine does not contravene the "one country, two systems" principle.

Hong Kong Basic Law Article 23 requires Hong Kong to enact local national security laws that prohibit treason, secession, sedition, subversion against the central government, theft of state secrets and foreign organisations from conducting political activities in Hong Kong. In 2003, the Hong Kong government tabled the National Security (Legislative Provisions) Bill 2003, which triggered widespread protest. The proposed legislation gave more power to the police, such as not requiring a search warrant to search the home of a suspected terrorist. After the demonstrations and the withdrawal by the Liberal Party of their support for the bill, the government shelved the bill indefinitely.

In 2024, the Hong Kong enacted the Safeguarding National Security Ordinance to implement Article 23. The bill includes five areas of national security crimes: treason, insurrection and incitement to mutiny, theft of state secrets and espionage, sabotage, and external interference.

=== Fiji and Rotuma ===
Rotuma has the status of dependency in Fiji.

=== Finland and Åland ===
The archipelago of Åland is a region of Finland, but compared to the other regions, it enjoys a high degree of home rule. Extensive autonomy was granted to it in the Act on the Autonomy of Åland of 1920 (last revised 1991), and the autonomy was affirmed by a League of Nations decision in 1921. The Parliament of Åland (Lagtinget) handles duties that in other provinces are exercised by state provincial offices of the central government. Åland sends one representative to the Finnish parliament, and is a member of the Nordic Council (independently of Finland). It is demilitarised, and the population is exempt from conscription. Åland has issued its own postage stamps since 1984, and runs its own police force. Most of Åland's inhabitants speak Swedish as their first language (91.2% in 2007). Åland's autonomous status was a result of disputes between Sweden and Imperial Russia in 1809, and between Finland and Sweden 1917–1921.

=== France and its overseas lands ===
Most of the French Republic is divided into 18 régions: 13 are in metropolitan France (Corsica, one of these, is strictly speaking not a région, but is often counted as such) and 5 are régions d'outre-mer (overseas regions). Not included in any région are five collectivités d'outre-mer, one territoire d'outre-mer, one collectivité sui generis and remote Clipperton Island (which is state private property under direct authority of the Minister of Overseas France). All are integral parts of France and subject to French law, but New Caledonia (the collectivité sui generis) and French Polynesia (one of the five collectivités d'outre-mer, but designated a pays d'outre-mer) have considerably more autonomy. All except the uninhabited French Southern and Antarctic Lands (the territoire d'outre-mer) and Clipperton Island are represented in the French parliament. Defence and diplomatic affairs are responsibilities of France, but some overseas parts do participate in some international organisations directly. (Réunion, for example, is a member of the Indian Ocean Commission.) The French overseas territories were in the past colonial possessions.

=== Iraq and Kurdistan ===
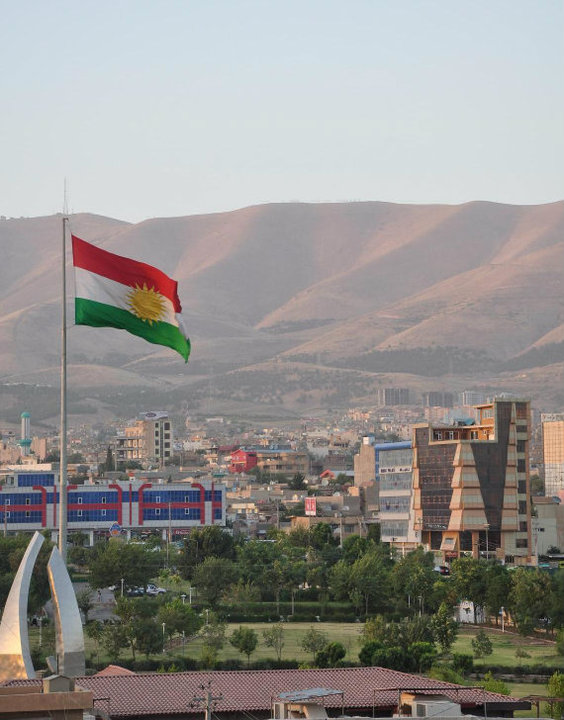
Kurdistan Region

Kurdistan Region of Iraq has de jure full sovereignty over internal matters. The agreement was upheld in the country's 2005 constitution.

=== Kashmir and India/Pakistan ===
After independence from British rule, princely states of the Indian Empire during the British Colonial Era were given the choice to opt for either to the new Dominions of India or Pakistan. The Kashmir state was ruled by a Hindu king Maharaja Hari Singh but the majority of its population was Muslim. According to Burton Stein's History of India,

"Kashmir was neither as large nor as old an independent state as Hyderabad; it had been created rather off-handedly by the British after the first defeat of the Sikhs in 1846, as a reward to a former official who had sided with the British. The Himalayan kingdom was connected to India through a district of the Punjab, but its population was 77 per cent Muslim and it shared a boundary with Pakistan. Hence, it was anticipated that the maharaja would accede to Pakistan when the British paramountcy ended on 14–15 August. When he hesitated to do this, Pathan tribesman launched a guerrilla onslaught meant to sway its ruler into their favour and became fugitive leader. Instead the Maharaja appealed to Mountbatten for assistance, and the governor-general agreed on the condition that the ruler accede to India. Indian soldiers entered Kashmir and drove the Pakistani-sponsored irregulars from all but a small section of the state. The United Nations was then invited to mediate the quarrel. The UN mission insisted that the opinion of Kashmiris must be ascertained, while India insisted that no referendum could occur until all of the state had been cleared of irregulars."

Currently, the region is divided amongst three countries in a territorial dispute: Pakistan controls the northwest portion (Gilgit–Baltistan and Azad Jammu and Kashmir), India controls the central and southern portion (Jammu and Kashmir) and Ladakh, and the People's Republic of China controls the northeastern portion (Aksai Chin and the Trans-Karakoram Tract). India controls the majority of the Siachen Glacier area including the Saltoro Ridge passes, whilst Pakistan controls the lower territory just southwest of the Saltoro Ridge. India controls 101,338 km^{2} (39,127 sq mi) of the disputed territory; Pakistan 85,846 km^{2} (33,145 sq mi); and the PRC, the remaining 37,555 km^{2} (14,500 sq mi).

=== Mauritius and Rodrigues ===
On 20 November 2001, the Mauritius National Assembly unanimously adopted two laws giving Rodrigues autonomy, creating a decentralised government system. This new legislation has allowed the implementation of a regional assembly in Rodrigues constituting 18 members and an executive council headed by a Chief Commissioner. The council meets every week to make decisions, draw up laws and manage the budget. The Chief Commissioner has the main task of informing the Mauritian Prime Minister of the management of the island's concerns.

=== Moldova and Gagauzia ===
In 1994 Gagauzia, a territory in the southern part of the Republic of Moldova inhabited by the Gagauz people, an ethnic group distinct from the majority Moldovans, was given autonomy including "the right of external self-determination". This is in contrast to the other subdivisions of Moldova (raioane) which are county-level administrative areas with little autonomy. However, the eastern part of Moldova is an internationally unrecognized breakaway republic (Transnistria) which is de facto self-governing.

=== Netherlands, Aruba, Curaçao and Sint Maarten ===
The Kingdom of the Netherlands consists of four autonomous countries, linked by the Charter for the Kingdom of the Netherlands as constituent parts: the Netherlands, an autonomous, independent country, and Aruba, Curaçao and Sint Maarten, three separate, non-independent, autonomous countries. (Aruba, Curaçao and Sint Maarten formerly made up the Netherlands Antilles, which was a colony of the Netherlands until 1954. Aruba reached an agreement on decolonization with the Kingdom of the Netherlands following a referendum held in 1977, and became autonomous and separate from the Antilles, with a status aparte: meaning the status of an autonomous country with its full autonomous country status officially recognized in the Charter since 1986.) The Charter links the four autonomous countries. Aruba, Curaçao, and St. Maarten do not each have statehood but have Dutch nationality in common with the Netherlands. Each of the four countries have separate constitutions, governments and parliaments, but Aruba alone has its own national currency and Central Bank.

The Council of Ministers of the Kingdom as a whole consists de facto of the Council of Ministers of the Netherlands together with three ministers plenipotentiary, one nominated by each of the other countries. The legislature of the Kingdom consists of the parliament of the Netherlands. De facto the cabinet and the parliament of the Netherlands are responsible for the administration of the dependencies Aruba, Curaçao and St. Maarten alongside being responsible for the Dutch government. There is limited participation of politicians of the other countries. Aruba, Curaçao and Sint Maarten share a Common Court of Appeals; the Dutch Hoge Raad ("High Council") acts as their supreme court.

Dutch nationals related to these territories are fully European Union citizens; however, Dutch-Caribbean citizens residing in Aruba, Curaçao and Sint Maarten are normally not entitled to vote in Dutch elections, but can vote in elections for the European Parliament. Aruba, Curaçao and Sint Maarten are overseas countries and territories (OCTs), listed under Annex II of the EC Treaty. Hence EC law does not apply there.

The Netherlands Antilles was scheduled to be dissolved as a unified political entity on 15 December 2008, so that the five constituent islands would attain new constitutional statuses within the Kingdom of the Netherlands, but this dissolution was postponed until 10 October 2010. Curaçao and Sint Maarten gained autonomy as non-independent countries within the Kingdom, as Aruba had in 1986, and the three remaining islands of Bonaire, Sint Eustatius and Saba became special municipalities of the Netherlands itself.

=== New Zealand, Cook Islands and Niue ===
Cook Islands is a member of the Pacific Islands Forum and as such is part of the "Umbrella Agreement" including Australia and New Zealand, called the "Pacific Agreement on Closer Economic Relations" (PACER). This agreement includes the future creation of a free trade area amongst the 14 ACP Forum Islands Countries (FICs) called the "Pacific Island Countries Trade Agreement" (PICTA), without Australia and New Zealand. Under the Cotonou Agreement, Cook Islands is committed to negotiating the new reciprocal Economic Partnership Agreement (EPA) between the ACP states and the EU, which was due to come into force in 2008. Cook Islands also benefits from the 9th EDF (PRIP) Regional Trade and Economic Integration Programme which provides approximately €9 million to assist the Region in implementing PICTA, negotiate trade agreements with developed partners (e.g. EPA), intensify links with the WTO and address supply-side constraints.

=== Nicaragua, North Caribbean Coast Autonomous Region, and South Caribbean Coast Autonomous Region ===
Nicaragua is divided into 15 departments and two autonomous regions: North Caribbean Coast and South Caribbean Coast. The two autonomous regions formed the historical department of Zelaya and part of the Mosquito Coast.

=== Papua New Guinea and Bougainville ===
Papua New Guinea is divided into 20 provinces. Among them Bougainville has an autonomous government.

=== Philippines and Bangsamoro ===
The Philippines is divided into 17 regions, with Bangsamoro only the one to have an autonomous region.

An earlier proposed autonomous region, the Bangsamoro Juridical Entity was "federacy" within the Philippines.

=== Saint Kitts and Nevis ===
Nevis is autonomous within Saint Kitts and Nevis, with its own deputy governor and government.

=== São Tomé and Príncipe ===
Príncipe has had self-government from São Tomé since 1995.

=== Serbia, Vojvodina and Kosovo ===
Serbia has two 'autonomous provinces' defined in its constitution: Vojvodina, and Kosovo & Metohija. The partially recognized Republic of Kosovo administers the latter, resulting in a territorial dispute.

=== Tajikistan and Gorno-Badakhshan ===
Badakhshan is an autonomous region in Tajikistan consisting of 7 local districts. Its government is considered somewhat sovereign to the Tajik government, but the region has from time to time been in militant conflict just as in 2014.

=== Tanzania and Zanzibar ===
Tanzania is divided in 30 regions. Five of those regions together form Zanzibar. This island is a self-governing region. It elects its own president who has control over the internal matters of the island. Zanzibar was an independent sultanate and a British protectorate, while Tanganyika was a German Schutzgebiet until 1919, when it became a British mandate territory. The two were united in 1964, after a popular revolt against the Sultan of Zanzibar.

=== Trinidad and Tobago ===
Tobago has its own House of Assembly, with its Chief Secretary. It handles some of the responsibilities of the Trinidad and Tobago central government.

=== Ukraine and Crimea ===
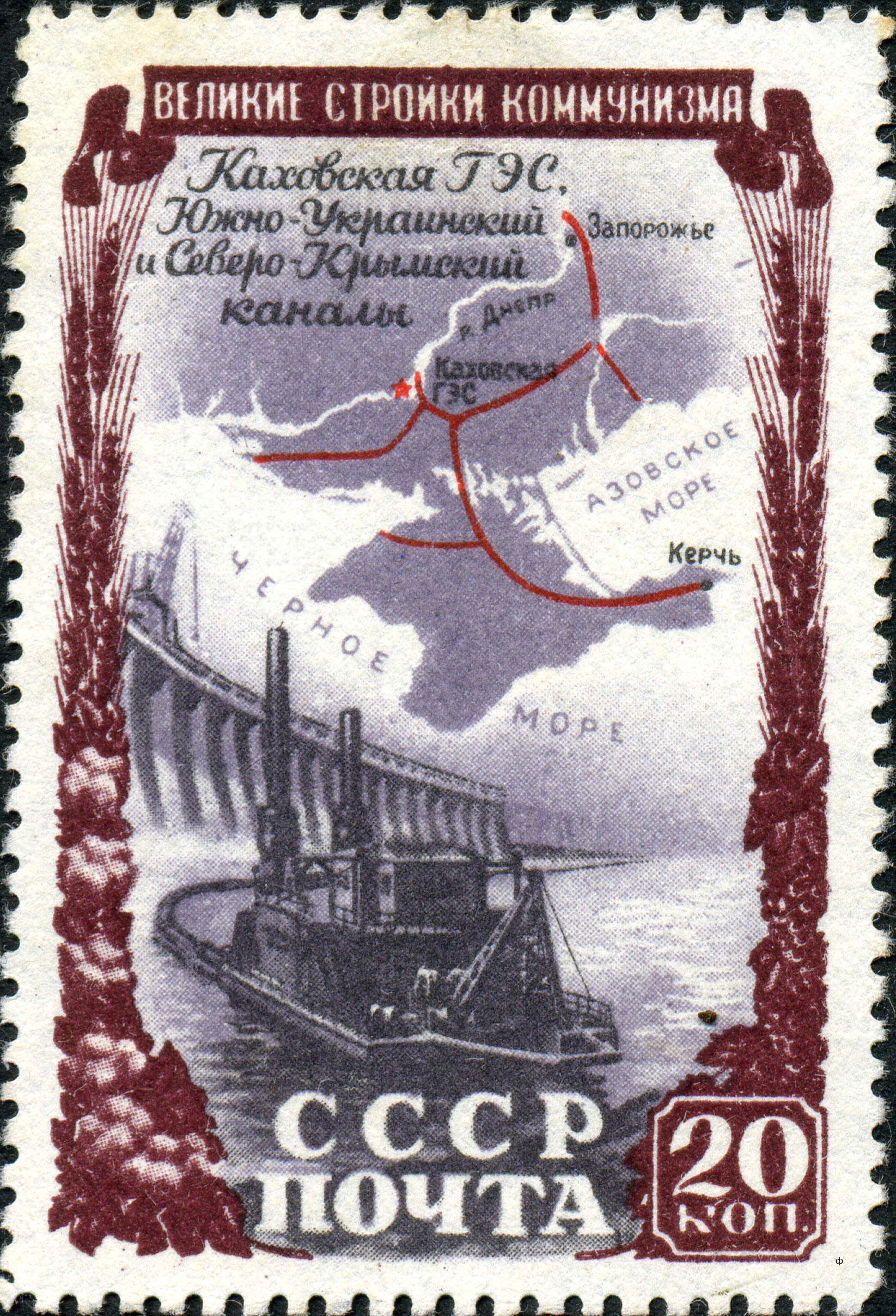
Soviet postal stamp of 1951 (3 years before Crimean transfer)

The Autonomous Republic of Crimea within Ukraine existed in unregulated form as the Constitution of Ukraine states that Ukraine is a unitary state, until the 2014 Russian annexation of Crimea. Following World War II, the peninsula was in a state of turmoil, intensified by the deportation of the Crimean Tatars, indigenous to the area, in the spring of 1944. In 1944, Kherson Oblast was created out of Mykolaiv and Zaporizhia oblasts in Soviet Ukraine. In summer of 1945 the peninsula was stripped of its autonomous status as its titular nationality, the Crimean Tatars, were removed and it was made a regular oblast of Russia. To resolve the issue of drought in Crimea, in 1950 construction started on the Kakhovka Hydroelectric Power Plant and a new city of Nova Kakhovka to serve it, both in Ukraine. At the same time there was a decision to build the North Crimean Canal. The new power station improved supply of power to the peninsula, while its dam created the Kakhovka Reservoir, which alleviates drought in the steppe areas of Kherson oblast and Crimea. In 1954, the Crimean Oblast was transferred to Soviet Ukraine from the Russian Soviet Federative Socialist Republic, primarily to improve bureaucratic efficiency since power and water in Crimea primarily came from Soviet Ukraine. The transfer represented a territorial readjustment for economic reasons between two administrative divisions of the centralized Soviet Union. During the 1960s, the North Crimean Canal was dug through the steppe territory of Crimea all the way to the city of Kerch. By the time of dissolution of the Soviet Union, the Crimean Oblast was a favorite vacation spot for top Communist officials from the whole Soviet Union. The then-leader of the Soviet Union Mikhail Gorbachev stayed in Foros during the 1991 August Putch at his "gosdacha". In 1989 political sanctions against Crimean Tatars in the Soviet Union were lifted and they started to return to their homeland. In 1991, as part of the so-called "Novo-Ogarevo process" (reorganization of the Soviet Union), a referendum was held on the restoration of autonomy to Crimea, but the referendum did not have an option for the Crimean Tatars to be restored as the titular nation. After the August Putsch, a referendum was held in Crimea on Ukrainian independence. In 1992, there was conflict surrounding competing Russian and Ukrainian claims on the former Soviet Black Sea Fleet that was based out of Sevastopol, and there was the possibility of escalation to armed conflict. In 1993 the Russian parliament adopted an official statement "About status of the Sevastopol City" where it made territorial claims against Ukrainian territory in Ukraine. The issue was brought to the Security Council. In 2003, the Tuzla Island conflict occurred. In 2014, Crimea was annexed by Russia and Ukraine lost de facto control of Crimea.

=== United States and Puerto Rico ===
The relationship between the United States and Puerto Rico is a federacy.

Puerto Rico residents are United States citizens and may freely travel between the U.S. mainland and Puerto Rico. Residents of Puerto Rico are exempt from some federal taxes. Puerto Rico's autonomy is granted by Congress. Federal taxes do not automatically apply to Puerto Rico unless the Government of Puerto Rico wants them to. Although the U.S. government has full say over its foreign policy, Puerto Rico does maintain direct contacts with its Caribbean neighbors.

Puerto Rico does not have full voting representation in the U.S. Congress, nor do its people vote for electors in U.S. presidential elections.

=== Uzbekistan and Karakalpakstan ===
Karakalpakstan is an autonomous republic that occupies the whole western portion of Uzbekistan.

== Comparison to other systems of autonomy ==
=== Associated states ===
A federacy differs from an associated state, such as the Federated States of Micronesia, the Marshall Islands, and Palau (in free association with the United States) and the Cook Islands and Niue (which are parts of the Realm of New Zealand). There are two kinds of associated state: in the case of the Federated States of Micronesia, the Marshall Islands, and Palau, association is concluded by treaty between two sovereign states; in the case of the Cook Islands and Niue, association is concluded by domestic legal arrangements.

=== Asymmetric federations ===
In an asymmetric federation one of the federated states has more independence than the others. An example of this is Canada, where Quebec has been given political deference to craft independent language and education policies.

Some unitary states, such as Spain and the United Kingdom, may also be regarded as asymmetric federations. For example, in Spain, the Basque Country, Catalonia and Galicia (later also Andalusia, Aragon, Balearic Islands, Canary Islands, Navarre, Valencia, etc.) have been granted greater autonomy and political deference than the rest of the Spanish autonomous communities (see: nationalities and regions of Spain).

The difference between an asymmetric federation and federacy is indistinct; a federacy is essentially an extreme case of an asymmetric federation, either due to large differences in the level of autonomy, or the rigidity of the constitutional arrangements.

=== British Overseas Territories ===
The British Overseas Territories are vested with varying degrees of power; some enjoy considerable independence from the United Kingdom, which only takes care of their foreign relations and defence. However, they are considered neither part of the United Kingdom nor sovereign or associated states.

=== Crown Dependencies ===
The relations between the United Kingdom and the Crown Dependencies, i.e. the Isle of Man and the bailiwicks of Guernsey and Jersey in the Channel Islands, are very similar to a federate relation: they enjoy independence from the United Kingdom, which, via The Crown, takes care of their foreign relations and defence—although the U.K. Parliament does have overall power to legislate for the dependencies. However, the islands are neither incorporated into the United Kingdom nor independent or associated states. The Isle of Man does not have a monarch but Charles III holds the position of Lord of Mann.

=== Devolution ===
A federacy differs from a devolved state, such as Denmark, Spain and the United Kingdom, because, in a devolved state, the central government can revoke the independence of the subunits (e.g. National Assembly for Wales and Northern Ireland Assembly in the case of the U.K.) without changing the constitution.

In the case of Scotland, the Scottish Parliament and Scottish Government became permanent parts of the constitution under the Scotland Act 2016, and can only have its independence revoked by a majority vote in a legally binding referendum.

== Criticisms ==
Jaime Lluch has critiqued the classification and description of "federacy" as used by Elazar and Watts. Lluch argues that the category of "federacy" is misapplied to the case of Puerto Rico (and to other comparable cases), and that it is an example of "conceptual stretching". He finds that "federacies" is in the end not a helpful category to understanding the types of institutional arrangements referred and recommends that scholars of comparative federalism find a more nuanced category to describe contemporary actually-existing autonomies such as Puerto Rico. Lluch shows that federacies have little to do with federalism, and are in fact distinct status arrangements that are more properly seen as "autonomies," of which there is a wide variety. This variety includes autonomies which are classified along a continuum that would take several "federacies" and reclassify them thus:

- Autonomies in unitary states: Corsica, Åland Islands, Faroe Islands, Crimea and Gagauzia.
- Non-federal autonomies in "federal political systems" (which he defines as systems having at least two orders of government, which combine elements of shared rule through common institutions with regional self-rule for the constituent units: a spectrum of polities including unions, constitutionally decentralized unions, federations, confederations and associated states): Puerto Rico, the Northern Marianas, Guam, Nunavut, Isle of Man, Jersey, Guernsey.
- Devolutionary autonomies in federal political systems: Scotland, Wales, Northern Ireland, South Tyrol, Valle d'Aosta, Sardinia, Sicily and Friuli-Venezia Giulia.
- Semi-federal autonomies in federal political systems: Catalonia, Basque Country and Galicia.

=== The case of Puerto Rico ===
In examining the Puerto Rico case, Lluch notes that although Elazar has mischaracterized the nature of the Puerto Rico–U.S. relationship, it is still cited as the prototype of a "federacy". Lluch defines Puerto Rico as a non-federal autonomy, which is officially an unincorporated territory belonging to the federal political system that is the U.S. and subject to the plenary powers of the U.S. Congress under the Territorial Clause of the U.S. Constitution, and states that it is not a "free-associated" state. Similar conclusions were made by three Presidential Task Forces on Puerto Rico's Status in 2005, 2007 and 2011. In particular, Lluch notes that contrary to Elazar's assertions in his 1987 and 1991 works, the power to terminate or modify the Puerto Rico–U.S. relationship rests squarely on the U.S. Congress and that the U.S. government contends that sovereignty over Puerto Rico resides solely in the United States and not in the people of Puerto Rico.

Lluch notes that both Watts and Elazar define a "federacy" as "political arrangements where a large unit is linked to a smaller unit or units, but the smaller unit retains considerable autonomy and has a minimum role in the government of the larger one, and where the relationship can be dissolved only by mutual agreement". However contrary to this definition he notes that far from having a minimum role in the government of the United States, Puerto Rico has no effective representation in Congress, except for a token representative that has no right to vote there. Nor do the residents of Puerto Rico vote for the U.S. president. However, Puerto Ricans are eligible to join U.S. political parties, and both major parties conduct primary elections for national positions in Puerto Rico. Puerto Rico thus has no direct representation in the institutions of the central state. He notes that essentially the Puerto Rico–U.S. relationship exhibits some elements of empire, and nearly none of federalism. Puerto Rico is better conceptualized as an exemplar of autonomism with the category of "federacy" being less helpful to explain it.

== See also ==
- Commonwealth realm
- Compact of Free Association
- Confederation
- Dominion
- Mainland
- One country, two systems
- Special administrative regions of China
- Unincorporated territory
