= Loyal Edwin Knappen =

American judge (1854–1930)

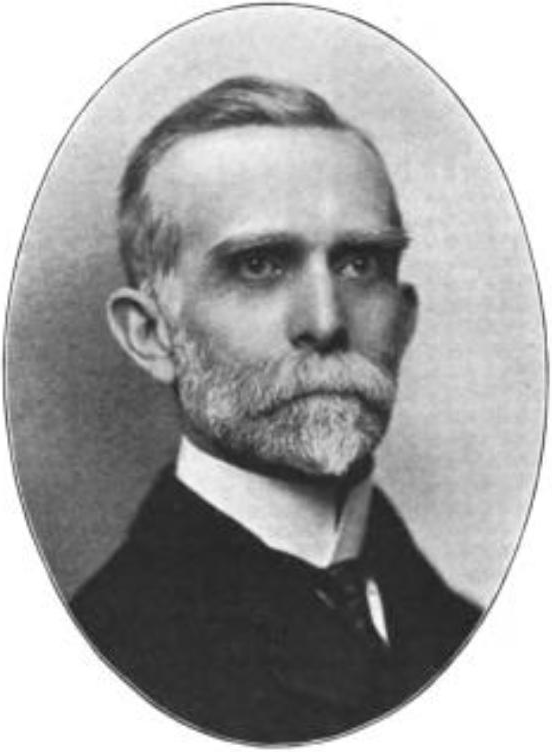

Senior Judge of the United States Court of Appeals for the Sixth Circuit
- In office April 15, 1924 – May 14, 1930

Judge of the United States Court of Appeals for the Sixth Circuit
- In office January 31, 1910 – April 15, 1924
- Appointed by: William Howard Taft
- Preceded by: Horace Harmon Lurton
- Succeeded by: Charles Harwood Moorman

Judge of the United States Circuit Courts for the Sixth Circuit
- In office January 31, 1910 – December 31, 1911
- Appointed by: William Howard Taft
- Preceded by: Horace Harmon Lurton
- Succeeded by: Seat abolished

Judge of the United States District Court for the Western District of Michigan
- In office December 10, 1906 – February 8, 1910
- Appointed by: Theodore Roosevelt
- Preceded by: George P. Wanty
- Succeeded by: Arthur Carter Denison

Personal details
- Born: Loyal Edwin Knappen; January 27, 1854 Hastings, Michigan, U.S.
- Died: May 14, 1930 (aged 76) Grand Rapids, Michigan, U.S.
- Education: University of Michigan (BA, MA) read law

Loyal Edwin Knappen (January 27, 1854 – May 14, 1930) was a United States circuit judge of the United States Court of Appeals for the Sixth Circuit and the United States Circuit Courts for the Sixth Circuit and previously was a United States district judge of the United States District Court for the Western District of Michigan.

== Education and career ==
Born in Hastings, Michigan, Knappen received a Bachelor of Arts degree from the University of Michigan in 1873 and read law to enter the bar in 1875, thereafter receiving a Master of Arts degree from the University of Michigan in 1876. He was in private practice in Hastings from 1875 to 1888, also serving as a prosecuting attorney of Barry County, Michigan from 1879 to 1883. He was a Commissioner for the United States District Court for the Western District of Michigan from 1880 to 1888. He was in private practice in Grand Rapids, Michigan from 1888 to 1906 with the law firm of Knappen, Uhl & Bryant, which had been founded as Fletcher & Wanty, and which continues to exist today as Wheeler Upham.

== Federal judicial service ==
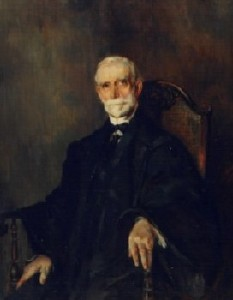
Judicial portrait of Knappen, 1934, by Mathias J. Alten.

Knappen was nominated by President Theodore Roosevelt on December 3, 1906, to a seat on the United States District Court for the Western District of Michigan vacated by the death of Judge George P. Wanty, who had founded the law firm of which Knappen was a partner. He was confirmed by the United States Senate on December 10, 1906, and received his commission the same day. His service terminated on February 8, 1910, due to his elevation to the Sixth Circuit.

Knappen was nominated by President William Howard Taft on January 17, 1910, to a joint seat on the United States Court of Appeals for the Sixth Circuit and the United States Circuit Courts for the Sixth Circuit vacated by Judge Horace Harmon Lurton. He was confirmed by the Senate on January 31, 1910, and received his commission the same day. On December 31, 1911, the Circuit Courts were abolished and he thereafter served only on the Court of Appeals. He was a member of the Conference of Senior Circuit Judges (now the Judicial Conference of the United States) from 1922 to 1923. He assumed senior status on April 15, 1924. His service terminated on May 14, 1930, due to his death in Grand Rapids.

== Sources ==
Legal offices
Preceded by George P. Wanty	Judge of the United States District Court for the Western District of Michigan; 1906–1910	Succeeded by Arthur Carter Denison
Preceded by Horace Harmon Lurton	Judge of the United States Circuit Courts for the Sixth Circuit; 1910–1911	Succeeded by Seat abolished
Preceded by Horace Harmon Lurton	Judge of the United States Court of Appeals for the Sixth Circuit; 1910–1924	Succeeded by Charles Harwood Moorman
