= Admission to the Union =

Process of states joining the United States

Admission to the Union is provided by the Admissions Clause of the United States Constitution in Article IV, Section 3, Clause 1, which authorizes the United States Congress to admit new states into the Union beyond the 13 states that already existed when the Constitution came into effect. The Constitution went into effect on June 21, 1788, in the nine states that had ratified it, and the U.S. federal government began operations under it on March 4, 1789, when it was in effect in 11 out of the 13 states. Since then, 37 states have been admitted into the Union. Each new state has been admitted on an equal footing with those already in existence.

Of the 37 states admitted to the Union by Congress, all but six have been established within existing U.S. organized incorporated territories. A state that was so created might encompass all or part of a territory. When the people of a territory or a region have grown to a sufficient population and made their desire for statehood known to the federal government, Congress in most cases has passed an enabling act, authorizing the people of that territory or region to frame a proposed state constitution as a step toward admission to the Union. In many instances, an enabling act would detail the mechanism by which the territory would be admitted as a state after the ratification of their constitution and the election of state officers.

The broad outline for the process was established by the Land Ordinance of 1784 and the 1787 Northwest Ordinance, both of which predate the U.S. Constitution.

== Admission process ==
=== Constitutional basis ===
This 2022 Congressional Research Service report examines the legal processes for admission to the Union.

==== Admission to the Union clause ====
The Admission to the Union Clause forbids the creation of new states from parts of existing states without the consent of all of the affected states and that of Congress. The primary intent of the caveat was to give the four Eastern States that still had western land claims (Connecticut, Georgia, North Carolina, and Virginia) a veto over whether their western counties could become states. The clause has since served the same function each time that a proposal to partition an existing state or states has arisen.

New States may be admitted by the Congress into this Union; but no new State shall be formed or erected within the Jurisdiction of any other State; nor any State be formed by the Junction of two or more States, or Parts of States, without the Consent of the Legislatures of the States concerned as well as of the Congress.

— Admission to the Union Clause, United States Constitution Article IV, Section 3, Clause 1

==== Equal footing doctrine ====
Shortly after the new Constitution went into effect Congress admitted Vermont and Kentucky on equal terms with the existing 13 states and thereafter formalized the condition in its acts of admission for subsequent states. Thus the Congress, utilizing the discretion allowed by the framers, adopted a policy of equal status for all newly admitted states. The constitutional principle derived from these actions is known as the equal footing doctrine. With the growth of states' rights advocacy during the antebellum period, the Supreme Court asserted, in Lessee of Pollard v. Hagan (1845), that the Constitution mandated admission of new states on the basis of equality.

=== Legal process ===
Historically, most new states formed by Congress have been established from an organized incorporated U.S. territory, created and governed by Congress in accord with its plenary power under Article IV, Section 3, Clause 2 of the Constitution. In some cases, an entire territory became a state; in others some part of a territory became a state. In most cases, the organized government of a territory made known the sentiment of its population in favor of statehood, usually by referendum. Congress then empowered that government to organize a constitutional convention to write a state constitution. Upon acceptance of that constitution, by the people of the territory and then by Congress, Congress would adopt by simple majority vote a joint resolution granting statehood. Then the President of the United States would sign the resolution and issue a proclamation announcing that a new state had been added to the Union. While Congress, which has ultimate authority over the admission of new states, has usually followed this procedure, there have been occasions when it did not.

==== Congressional enabling acts ====
An enabling act is the formal statute passed by Congress that authorizes the people of a territory to frame a proposed state constitution. It details the precise legal mechanism for admission, including the election of state officers and the ratification process. Congress has also frequently used them to impose specific statutory conditions or restrictions on incoming states. For example:

- The enabling acts for Utah, Arizona, New Mexico, and Oklahoma explicitly prohibited the practice of polygamy as a condition for entry.
- Nevada's enabling act of 1864 required the territory to outlaw slavery and involuntary servitude (except as criminal punishment), guarantee absolute freedom of religious practice, and cede all public land claims to the federal government.

Once a territory drafts its constitution, it is submitted back to Congress for final approval. Congress retains the right to reject the document if it fails to meet the act's conditions; in 1866, for instance, Congress initially refused Nebraska's proposed constitution because it restricted voting rights exclusively to white males.

Enabling Acts approved by Congress include:

- Enabling Act of 1802, for the formation of Ohio from the Northwest Territory
- Enabling Act of 1811, for the formation of Louisiana from the Territory of Orleans
- Enabling Act of 1864, for the formation of Nevada
- Enabling Act of 1889, for the formation of North Dakota, South Dakota, Montana, and Washington
- Enabling Act of 1894, for the formation of Utah
- Enabling Act of 1906 for the formation of Oklahoma from Oklahoma Territory and Indian Territory
- Enabling Act of 1910, for the admission of Arizona and New Mexico

Although the use of an enabling act is a traditional historic practice, a number of territories have drafted constitutions for submission to Congress absent an enabling act and were subsequently admitted, and the act of Congress admitting Kentucky to the Union was passed before the constitution of Kentucky was drafted.

== History ==
The order in which the original 13 states ratified the constitution, then the order in which the others were admitted to the union

=== Articles of Confederation ===
Between 1781 and 1789, the United States was governed by a unicameral Congress, the Congress of the Confederation, which operated under authority granted to it by the Articles of Confederation, the nation's first constitution. The 11th Article authorized Congress to admit new states to the Union provided nine states consented. Under the Articles, each state cast one vote on each proposed measure in Congress.

During this period, the Confederation Congress enacted two ordinances governing the admission of new states into the Union. The first such ordinance was the Land Ordinance of 1784, enacted April 23, 1784. Thomas Jefferson was its principal author. The ordinance called for the land (recently confirmed as part of the United States by the Treaty of Paris) west of the Appalachian Mountains, north of the Ohio River and east of the Mississippi River to eventually be divided into ten states. Once a given area reached 20,000 inhabitants, it could call a constitutional convention and form a provisional government. Then, upon enacting a state constitution which affirmed that the new state would forever be part of the Confederation, it would be admitted on an equal footing with all other states, based on a majority vote in Congress. Stipulations for new state dictated that it would be subject to the Articles of Confederation and acts of Congress; would be subject to payment for federal debts; would not tax federal properties within the state border or tax non-residents at a rate higher than residents; and would have a republican form of government. Jefferson's original draft of the ordinance gave names to the proposed states and contained a provision that "After the year 1800 there shall be neither slavery nor involuntary servitude in any of them."

The 1784 ordinance was superseded three years later by the Northwest Ordinance of 1787. Enacted by the Confederation Congress on July 13, 1787, it created the Northwest Territory, the first organized incorporated territory of the United States. The Northwest Ordinance (Article V) provided for the admission of several new states from within its bounds:

There shall be formed in the said territory, not less than three nor more than five States [...] And, whenever any of the said States shall have sixty thousand free inhabitants therein, such State shall be admitted, by its delegates, into the Congress of the United States, on an equal footing with the original States in all respects whatever, and shall be at liberty to form a permanent constitution and State government: Provided, the constitution and government so to be formed, shall be republican, and in conformity to the principles contained in these articles; and, so far as it can be consistent with the general interest of the confederacy, such admission shall be allowed at an earlier period, and when there may be fewer free inhabitants in the State than sixty thousand.

While the Articles of Confederation were in effect, the Congress considered various ordinances admitting particular new states into the Union, none of which were approved:

- On August 20, 1781, Congress passed a resolution stating conditions under which the Vermont Republic (at the time a de facto but unrecognized sovereign state) could enter the Union. It needed only to give up its claims to territory west of Lake Champlain and east of the Connecticut River. In February 1782, the legislature of Vermont agreed to those terms. However, Vermont's admission was opposed by New York, which asserted a disputed claim to the region and consequently successfully resisted the proposed admission.
- On May 16, 1785, a resolution to admit Frankland (later modified to Franklin) to the Union was introduced in Congress. Eventually, seven states voted to admit what would have been the 14th state. This was, however, fewer than the nine states required by the Articles of Confederation. The proposed state was located in what is today East Tennessee and within the territory west of the Appalachian Mountains that had been offered by North Carolina as a cession to Congress to help pay off debts related to the Revolutionary War. It continued to exist as an extra-legal state through mid-1788, when North Carolina reassumed full sovereignty over the area. In 1790, when North Carolina again ceded the region, the area that comprised Franklin became part of the Southwest Territory, the precursor to the state of Tennessee.
- In July 1788, Congress began deliberations on whether to admit Kentucky to the Union. Kentucky was then a part of Virginia. The legislature of Virginia had consented to the creation of the new state from its western district. However, when Congress began to discuss the matter, they received notification that New Hampshire had ratified the Constitution, becoming the ninth state to do so, causing it to go into effect in the ratifying states. Congress instead passed a resolution stating that it was "unadvisable" to admit a new state under those circumstances and the matter should wait until the federal government under the Constitution came into existence.

Considered one of the most important legislative acts of the Confederation Congress, the Northwest Ordinance established the precedent by which the Federal government would be sovereign and expand westward with the admission of new states, rather than with the expansion of existing states and their established sovereignty under the Articles of Confederation. No new states were formed in the Northwest Territory under either ordinance. In 1789, the 1st United States Congress reaffirmed the Northwest Ordinance with slight modifications. The Northwest Territory remained in existence until 1803, when the southeastern portion of it was admitted to the Union as the State of Ohio, and the remainder was reorganized.

=== 1787 Constitutional Convention ===
At the 1787 Constitutional Convention, a proposal to include the phrase "new States shall be admitted on the same terms with the original States" in the new states clause was defeated. That proposal would have taken the policy articulated in the Ordinance of 1784 and made it a constitutional imperative. Many delegates objected to including the phrase, fearing that the political power of future new western states would ultimately overwhelm that of the established eastern states.

Delegates, understanding that the number of states would inevitably increase, did agree to include wording into this clause to preclude formation of a new state out of an established one without the consent of the established state as well as the Congress. It was anticipated that Kentucky (which was a part of Virginia), Franklin (which was a part of North Carolina, and later became part of the Southwest Territory), Vermont (to which New York asserted a disputed claim), and Maine (which was a part of Massachusetts), would become states. As a result of this compromise, new breakaway states are permitted to join the Union but only with the proper consents.

States that were never part of an organized U.S. territory

=== Subsequently incorporated states ===
In addition to the original 13, six subsequent states were never part of an organized incorporated U.S. territory:

- Vermont, admitted March 4, 1791, was formed from the territory of the Vermont Republic (earlier known as the New Hampshire Grants). This territory was also claimed by New York. The resulting dispute led to the rise of the Green Mountain Boys and the later establishment of the Vermont Republic. New Hampshire's claim upon the land was extinguished in 1764 by royal order of George III, and on March 6, 1790, the state of New York ceded its claim to Vermont for 30,000 Spanish dollars.
- Kentucky, admitted June 1, 1792, was set off from Virginia (previously its western District of Kentucky counties). The Virginia General Assembly adopted legislation on December 18, 1789, separating its "District of Kentucky" from the rest of the state and approving its statehood.
- Maine, admitted March 15, 1820, was set off from Massachusetts (previously the District of Maine, its northern exclave). The Massachusetts General Court passed enabling legislation on June 19, 1819, consenting to the separation of the District of Maine from the rest of the state (an action approved by the voters in Maine on July 19, 1819); then, on February 25, 1820, passed a follow-up measure officially accepting the fact of Maine's imminent statehood. The act of Congress establishing Maine as the 23rd state was part of the Missouri Compromise of 1820.
- Texas, admitted December 29, 1845, was formed from the territory of the Republic of Texas following the republic's annexation into the United States earlier in 1845.
- California, admitted September 9, 1850, was formed from unorganized territory ceded to the United States by Mexico in the 1848 Treaty of Guadalupe Hidalgo at the end of the Mexican–American War. The Act of Congress establishing California as the 31st state was part of the Compromise of 1850.
- West Virginia, admitted June 20, 1863, during the Civil War, was set off from Virginia (previously its northwestern trans-Allegheny region). The General Assembly of the Restored Government of Virginia passed an act on May 13, 1862, granting permission for the creation of West Virginia. Later, by its ruling in Virginia v. West Virginia (1871), the Supreme Court implicitly affirmed that the breakaway Virginia counties did have the proper consents required to become a separate state.

==== Failed statehood proposals ====
Congress is under no obligation to admit states, even in those areas whose population expresses a desire for statehood. For instance:

- Mormon pioneers in Salt Lake City sought to establish the state of Deseret in 1849. It existed for slightly over two years and was never approved by the Congress.
- In 1905, leaders of the Five Civilized Tribes (Cherokee, Chickasaw, Choctaw, Creek, and Seminole) in Indian Territory proposed to establish the state of Sequoyah as a means to retain control of their lands. The move for statehood under the proposed constitution ultimately failed in Congress. Instead, the Indian Territory was incorporated into the new state of Oklahoma in 1907.
- Since 2012, four locally organized status referendums in Puerto Rico have endorsed statehood. None has resulted in action from Congress.

==== Time to transition from Territory to State ====
Some U.S. territories existed only a short time before becoming states, while others remained territories for decades. The shortest-lived was Alabama Territory at 2 years, while New Mexico and Hawaii territories both were in existence for more than 50 years. The entry of several states into the Union has been delayed by complicating factors. Among them, Michigan Territory, which petitioned Congress for statehood in 1835, was not admitted to the Union until 1837, because of a boundary dispute with the adjacent state of Ohio. The independent Republic of Texas requested annexation to the United States in 1837, but fears about potential conflict with Mexico delayed the admission of Texas for nine years. Also, statehood for Kansas Territory was held up for several years (1854–1861) because of a series of internal violent conflicts involving anti-slavery and pro-slavery factions.

=== Changes in state borders ===
Once established, most state borders have, with few exceptions, been generally stable. Notable exceptions include: the various portions (the Western land claims) of several original states ceded over a period of several years to the federal government, which in turn became the Northwest Territory, Southwest Territory, and Mississippi Territory; the 1791 cession by Maryland and Virginia of land to create the District of Columbia (Virginia's portion was returned in 1847); and the creation, on at least three occasions, of a new state (Kentucky, Maine and West Virginia) from a region of an existing state (Vermont was created from what was disputedly claimed to be a part of New York and was not admitted until New York consented); two large additions to Nevada, which became a state in 1864, were made in 1866 and 1867.

There have been numerous minor adjustments to state boundaries over the years as a result of improved surveys, resolution of ambiguous or disputed boundary definitions, or minor mutually agreed boundary adjustments for administrative convenience or other purposes. One notable example is the case New Jersey v. New York, in which New Jersey won roughly 90% of Ellis Island from New York in 1998.

== See also ==
- 51st state
- An Act for the Admission of the State of California
- Enabling Act of 1802, authorizing residents of the eastern portion of the Northwest Territory to form the state of Ohio
- Legal status of Texas
- Enabling Act of 1889, authorizing residents of Dakota, Montana, and Washington territories to form state governments (Dakota to be divided into two states) and to gain admission to the Union
- Enabling Act of 1906 authorizing residents of Oklahoma, Indian, New Mexico, and Arizona territories to form state governments (Indian and Oklahoma territories to be combined into one state) and to gain admission to the Union
- Alaska Statehood Act, admitting Alaska as a state in the Union as of January 3, 1959
- Hawaii Admission Act, admitting Hawaii as a state in the Union as of August 21, 1959
- Federalism in the United States
- List of U.S. states by date of admission to the Union
- List of U.S. state partition proposals
- Perpetual Union
- State cessions
- Statehood movement in the District of Columbia
- Statehood movement in Puerto Rico
- Secession in the United States
