= Coyle v. Smith =

- Supreme Court of the United States

Argued April 5–6, 1911 Decided May 29, 1911
- Full case name: W.H. Coyle v. Thomas P. Smith, Secretary of State of the State of Oklahoma
- Citations: 221 U.S. 559 (more) 31 S. Ct. 688; 55 L. Ed. 853

Holding
- Oklahoma Enabling Act provision prohibiting state from moving its capital city was invalid after admission. Oklahoma Supreme Court affirmed.

Court membership
- Chief Justice Edward D. White Associate Justices John M. Harlan · Joseph McKenna; Oliver W. Holmes Jr. · William R. Day; Horace H. Lurton · Charles E. Hughes; Willis Van Devanter · Joseph R. Lamar

Case opinions
- Majority: Lurton, joined by White, Harlan, Day, Hughes, Van Devanter, Lamar
- Dissent: Holmes, joined by McKenna

Coyle v. Smith, 221 U.S. 559 (1911), was a Supreme Court of the United States case that held that the newly created state of Oklahoma was permitted to move its capital city from Guthrie to Oklahoma City, notwithstanding the Enabling Act provision that prohibited it from being moved from Guthrie until after 1913.

== Background ==
In 1907, Oklahoma was admitted as a U.S. state. The new state's capital was located in Guthrie. Section 497 of the Oklahoma Constitution stated that the terms of the U.S. Congress's enabling act of 1906—which allowed Oklahoma to create a state constitution and be admitted to the Union—were "accepted by ordinance irrevocable". Section 2 of the enabling act read:

The capital of said state shall temporarily be at the city of Guthrie ... and shall not be changed therefrom previous to Anno Domini nineteen hundred and thirteen; but said capital shall, after said year, be located by the electors of said state at an election to be provided for by the legislature; ...

On December 29, 1910, the state of Oklahoma enacted a statute which removed the state capital from Guthrie to Oklahoma City. W.H. Coyle, owner of large property interests in Guthrie, sued the state of Oklahoma, arguing that the move was performed in violation of the state constitution's acceptance of the terms of Congress's enabling act.

== Holding ==
The Supreme Court held that preventing the state of Oklahoma the right to locate its own seat of government deprived it of powers which all other states of the Union enjoyed, and thus violated the traditional constitutional principle that all new states be admitted "on an equal footing with the original states". As a result, the provision of the enabling act which temporarily restricted Oklahoma's right to determine where its seat of government was no longer valid after Oklahoma was actually admitted. As stated by Justice Lurton:

Has Oklahoma been admitted upon an equal footing with the original states? If she has, she, by virtue of her jurisdictional sovereignty as such a state, may determine for her own people the proper location of the local seat of government. She is not equal in power to them if she cannot.

Quoting Chief Justice Chase's opinions regarding the indestructibility of the Union and the principle of federalism contained in Texas v. White and Lane County v. Oregon, the opinion concludes:

To this we may add that the constitutional equality of the States is essential to the harmonious operation of the scheme upon which the Republic was organized. When that equality disappears, we may remain a free people, but the Union will not be the Union of the Constitution.

== See also ==
- List of United States Supreme Court cases, volume 221
- Symmetric federalism
