= List of United States Supreme Court cases, volume 270 =

Supreme Court of the United States
- Interactive map of Supreme Court of the United States
- 38°53′26″N 77°00′16″W
- Established: March 4, 1789; 237 years ago
- Location: Washington, D.C.
- Coordinates: 38°53′26″N 77°00′16″W
- Composition method: Presidential nomination with Senate confirmation
- Authorised by: Constitution of the United States, Art. III, § 1
- Judge term length: life tenure, subject to impeachment and removal
- Number of positions: 9 (by statute)
- Website: supremecourt.gov

This is a list of cases reported in volume 270 of United States Reports, decided by the Supreme Court of the United States in 1926.

== Justices of the Supreme Court at the time of volume 270 U.S. ==
The Supreme Court is established by Article III, Section 1 of the Constitution of the United States, which says: "The judicial Power of the United States, shall be vested in one supreme Court . . .". The size of the Court is not specified; the Constitution leaves it to Congress to set the number of justices. Under the Judiciary Act of 1789 Congress originally fixed the number of justices at six (one chief justice and five associate justices). Since 1789 Congress has varied the size of the Court from six to seven, nine, ten, and back to nine justices (always including one chief justice).

When the cases in volume 270 were decided the Court comprised the following nine members:

Portrait	Justice	Office	Home State	Succeeded	Date confirmed by the Senate (Vote)	Tenure on Supreme Court
	William Howard Taft	Chief Justice	Connecticut	Edward Douglass White	June 30, 1921 (Acclamation)	July 11, 1921 – February 3, 1930 (Retired)
	Oliver Wendell Holmes Jr.	Associate Justice	Massachusetts	Horace Gray	December 4, 1902 (Acclamation)	December 8, 1902 – January 12, 1932 (Retired)
	Willis Van Devanter	Associate Justice	Wyoming	Edward Douglass White (as Associate Justice)	December 15, 1910 (Acclamation)	January 3, 1911 – June 2, 1937 (Retired)
	James Clark McReynolds	Associate Justice	Tennessee	Horace Harmon Lurton	August 29, 1914 (44–6)	October 12, 1914 – January 31, 1941 (Retired)
	Louis Brandeis	Associate Justice	Massachusetts	Joseph Rucker Lamar	June 1, 1916 (47–22)	June 5, 1916 – February 13, 1939 (Retired)
	George Sutherland	Associate Justice	Utah	John Hessin Clarke	September 5, 1922 (Acclamation)	October 2, 1922 – January 17, 1938 (Retired)
	Pierce Butler	Associate Justice	Minnesota	William R. Day	December 21, 1922 (61–8)	January 2, 1923 – November 16, 1939 (Died)
	Edward Terry Sanford	Associate Justice	Tennessee	Mahlon Pitney	January 29, 1923 (Acclamation)	February 19, 1923 – March 8, 1930 (Died)
	Harlan F. Stone	Associate Justice	New York	Joseph McKenna	February 5, 1925 (71–6)	March 2, 1925 – July 2, 1941 (Continued as chief justice)

== Citation style ==
Under the Judiciary Act of 1789 the federal court structure at the time comprised District Courts, which had general trial jurisdiction; Circuit Courts, which had mixed trial and appellate (from the US District Courts) jurisdiction; and the United States Supreme Court, which had appellate jurisdiction over the federal District and Circuit courts—and for certain issues over state courts. The Supreme Court also had limited original jurisdiction (i.e., in which cases could be filed directly with the Supreme Court without first having been heard by a lower federal or state court). There were one or more federal District Courts and/or Circuit Courts in each state, territory, or other geographical region.

The Judiciary Act of 1891 created the United States Courts of Appeals and reassigned the jurisdiction of most routine appeals from the district and circuit courts to these appellate courts. The Act created nine new courts that were originally known as the "United States Circuit Courts of Appeals." The new courts had jurisdiction over most appeals of lower court decisions. The Supreme Court could review either legal issues that a court of appeals certified or decisions of court of appeals by writ of certiorari. On January 1, 1912, the effective date of the Judicial Code of 1911, the old Circuit Courts were abolished, with their remaining trial court jurisdiction transferred to the U.S. District Courts.

Bluebook citation style is used for case names, citations, and jurisdictions.

- "# Cir." = United States Court of Appeals
  - e.g., "3d Cir." = United States Court of Appeals for the Third Circuit
- "D." = United States District Court for the District of . . .
  - e.g.,"D. Mass." = United States District Court for the District of Massachusetts
- "E." = Eastern; "M." = Middle; "N." = Northern; "S." = Southern; "W." = Western
  - e.g.,"M.D. Ala." = United States District Court for the Middle District of Alabama
- "Ct. Cl." = United States Court of Claims
- The abbreviation of a state's name alone indicates the highest appellate court in that state's judiciary at the time.
  - e.g.,"Pa." = Supreme Court of Pennsylvania
  - e.g.,"Me." = Supreme Judicial Court of Maine

== List of cases in volume 270 U.S. ==
Case Name	Page and year	Opinion of the Court	Concurring opinion(s)	Dissenting opinion(s)	Lower Court	Disposition
United States v. St. Louis, San Francisco and Texas Railway Company	1 (1926)	Brandeis	none	none	Ct. Cl.	affirmed
H.E. Crook Company, Inc. v. United States	4 (1926)	Holmes	none	none	Ct. Cl.	affirmed
Mandelbaum v. United States	7 (1926)	Holmes	none	none	8th Cir.	affirmed
Maryland v. Soper I	9 (1926)	Taft	none	none	D. Md.	mandamus granted
Maryland v. Soper II	36 (1926)	Taft	none	none	D. Md.	mandamus granted
Maryland v. Soper III	44 (1926)	Taft	none	none	D. Md.	mandamus granted
Cole v. Norborne Drainage District	45 (1926)	Holmes	none	none	W.D. Mo.	affirmed
United States v. Holt State Bank	49 (1926)	VanDevanter	none	none	8th Cir.	affirmed
Millers' Indemnity Underwriters v. Braud	59 (1926)	McReynolds	none	none	Tex.	affirmed
Interocean Oil Company v. United States	65 (1926)	Taft	none	none	Ct. Cl.	affirmed
Rhode Island Hospital Trust Company v. Doughton	69 (1926)	Taft	none	none	N.C.	reversed
Independent Wireless Telegraph Company v. Radio Corporation of America	84 (1926)	Taft	none	none	2d Cir.	rehearing denied
Oregon Railroad and Navigation Company v. Washington	87 (1926)	Taft	none	McReynolds	Wash.	reversed
Southern Pacific Company v. United States	103 (1926)	Taft	none	none	Ct. Cl.	dismissed
Cincinnati, Indianapolis and Western Railroad Company v. Indianapolis Union Railway Company	107 (1926)	Taft	none	none	S.D. Ohio	reversed
Goldsmith v. United States Board of Tax Appeals	117 (1926)	Taft	none	none	D.C. Cir.	affirmed
United States v. Swift and Company	124 (1926)	Taft	none	none	Ct. Cl.	affirmed
Morse v. United States	151 (1926)	Taft	none	none	Ct. Cl.	dismissed
Rogers v. United States	154 (1926)	Taft	none	none	Ct. Cl.	affirmed
Girard Trust Company v. United States	163 (1926)	Taft	none	none	Ct. Cl.	reversed
White v. United States	175 (1926)	Holmes	none	none	E.D. Va.	affirmed
United States v. Minnesota	181 (1926)	VanDevanter	none	none	original	multiple
L. Littlejohn and Company v. United States	215 (1926)	McReynolds	none	none	S.D.N.Y.	affirmed
Sanchez v. Deering	227 (1926)	McReynolds	none	none	5th Cir.	affirmed
Schlesinger v. Wisconsin	230 (1926)	McReynolds	none	none	Wis.	reversed
First Moon v. White Tail	243 (1926)	McReynolds	none	none	W.D. Okla.	affirmed
Iselin v. United States	245 (1926)	Brandeis	none	none	Ct. Cl.	reversed
Midland Land and Improvement Company v. United States	251 (1926)	Brandeis	none	none	Ct. Cl.	affirmed
Armour and Company v. Fort Morgan Steamship Company	253 (1926)	Brandeis	none	none	5th Cir.	affirmed
Chesapeake and Ohio Railway Company v. Westinghouse, Church, Kerr and Company, Inc.	260 (1926)	Brandeis	none	none	Va.	affirmed
Texas and Pacific Railway Company v. Gulf, Colorado and Santa Fe Railway Company	266 (1926)	Brandeis	none	none	5th Cir.	reversed
Marion and Rye Valley Railway Company v. United States	280 (1926)	Brandeis	none	none	Ct. Cl.	affirmed
Chicago, Indianapolis and Louisville Railway Company v. United States	287 (1926)	Brandeis	none	none	D. Ind.	affirmed
Michigan v. Wisconsin	295 (1926)	Sutherland	none	none	original	boundary set
United States v. Reading Company	320 (1926)	Butler	none	none	Ct. Cl.	multiple
United States v. Cohn	339 (1926)	Sanford	none	none	N.D. Ill.	affirmed
Chamberlain Machine Works v. United States	347 (1926)	Sanford	none	none	Ct. Cl.	affirmed
Fleischmann Construction Company v. United States ex rel. Forsberg	349 (1926)	Sanford	none	none	4th Cir.	affirmed
Seaboard Rice Milling Company v. Chicago, Rock Island and Pacific Railroad Company	363 (1926)	Sanford	none	none	E.D. Mo.	affirmed
General American Tank Car Corporation v. Day	367 (1926)	Stone	none	none	E.D. La.	affirmed
Towar Cotton Mills, Inc. v. United States	375 (1926)	Stone	none	none	Ct. Cl.	affirmed
Risty v. Chicago, Rock Island and Pacific Railroad Company	378 (1926)	Stone	none	none	8th Cir.	multiple
Alexander Milburn Company v. Davis Bournonville Company	390 (1926)	Holmes	none	none	2d Cir.	reversed
Weaver v. Palmer Brothers Company	402 (1926)	Butler	none	Holmes	W.D. Pa.	affirmed
Chesapeake and Ohio Railway Company v. Thompson Manufacturing Company	416 (1926)	Stone	none	none	W. Va.	reversed
Ashe v. United States ex rel. Valotta	424 (1926)	Holmes	none	none	W.D. Pa.	reversed
Fidelity and Deposit Company of Maryland v. Tafoya	426 (1926)	Holmes	none	McReynolds	D.N.M.	reversed
Barnette v. Wells Fargo Nevada National Bank	438 (1926)	Stone	none	Brandeis	9th Cir.	affirmed
Edwards v. Chile Copper Company	452 (1926)	Holmes	none	none	2d Cir.	reversed
Smith v. McCullough	456 (1926)	VanDevanter	none	none	8th Cir.	reversed
Missouri Pacific Railroad Company v. Boone	466 (1926)	Brandeis	none	none	Mo. Ct. App.	affirmed
Cherokee Nation v. United States	476 (1926)	Taft	none	none	Ct. Cl.	affirmed
Luckett v. Delpark, Inc.	496 (1926)	Taft	none	none	D.N.J.	affirmed
United States v. P. Koenig Coal Company	512 (1926)	Taft	none	none	E.D. Mich.	reversed
United States v. Michigan Portland Cement Company	521 (1926)	Taft	none	none	E.D. Mich.	reversed
United States v. National Exchange Bank of Baltimore	527 (1926)	Holmes	none	none	4th Cir.	affirmed
Liberato v. Royer	535 (1926)	Holmes	none	none	Pa.	affirmed
Great Northern Railroad Company v. Reed	539 (1926)	VanDevanter	none	none	Wash.	reversed
Peoples Natural Gas Company v. Public Service Commission of Pennsylvania	550 (1926)	VanDevanter	none	none	Pa.	affirmed
Childers v. Beaver	555 (1926)	McReynolds	none	none	E.D. Okla.	affirmed
Harrigan v. Bergdoll	560 (1926)	Brandeis	none	none	Pa.	affirmed
Mellon v. Weiss	565 (1926)	Brandeis	none	none	Boston Mun. Ct.	reversed
Tutun v. United States	568 (1926)	Brandeis	none	none	multiple	certification
Minneapolis and St. Louis Railway Company v. Peoria and Pekin Union Railway Company	580 (1926)	Brandeis	none	none	S.D. Iowa	affirmed
Smith v. Illinois Bell Telephone Company	587 (1926)	Sutherland	none	none	S.D. Ill.	affirmed
Moore v. New York Cotton Exchange	593 (1926)	Sutherland	none	none	2d Cir.	affirmed
A compulsory counterclaim under state law arising out of the same transaction as a case in federal court can be heard by a federal court exercising ancillary jurisdiction.
Chicago, Rock Island and Pacific Railroad Company v. Schendel	611 (1926)	Sutherland	none	none	Minn.	multiple
