= George P. Wanty =

American judge

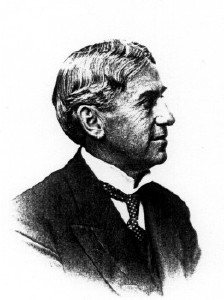

Judge of the United States District Court for the Western District of Michigan
- In office March 13, 1900 – July 9, 1906
- Appointed by: William McKinley
- Preceded by: Henry Franklin Severens
- Succeeded by: Loyal Edwin Knappen

Personal details
- Born: George P. Wanty; March 12, 1856 Ann Arbor, Michigan, U.S.
- Died: July 9, 1906 (aged 50)
- Education: University of Michigan Law School (LL.B.)

George P. Wanty (March 12, 1856 – July 9, 1906) was a United States district judge of the United States District Court for the Western District of Michigan.

== Education and career ==
Born in Ann Arbor, Michigan, Wanty received a Bachelor of Laws from the University of Michigan Law School in 1878 and went into private practice. In 1883, he partnered with Niram A. Fletcher to form the law firm of Fletcher & Wanty, which is known today as Wheeler Upham, P.C. Wanty remained in private practice to 1900.

== Federal judicial service ==
On March 7, 1900, Wanty was nominated by President William McKinley to a seat on the United States District Court for the Western District of Michigan vacated by Judge Henry Franklin Severens. Wanty was confirmed by the United States Senate on March 13, 1900, and received his commission the same day. He served in that capacity until his death on July 9, 1906. He was succeeded by another attorney from the firm that he had founded, Loyal Edwin Knappen.

== Sources ==
Legal offices
Preceded by Henry Franklin Severens	Judge of the United States District Court for the Western District of Michigan; 1900–1906	Succeeded by Loyal Edwin Knappen
