= Bremen clause =

Article in the German Basic Law

The Bremen clause (German: Bremer Klausel) is Article 141 of the Basic Law for the Federal Republic of Germany.

== Background ==
The clause states:

Artikel 7 Abs. 3 Satz 1 findet keine Anwendung in einem Lande, in dem am 1. Januar 1949 eine andere landesrechtliche Regelung bestand. The first sentence of paragraph (3) of Article 7 shall not apply in any state where state law provides otherwise on 1 January 1949.

The sentence cited provides:

Der Religionsunterricht ist in den öffentlichen Schulen mit Ausnahme der bekenntnisfreien Schulen ordentliches Lehrfach. Religious instruction shall form part of the regular curriculum in state schools, with the exception of non-denominational schools.

It limits the range of application of the constitutional (Basic Law) rule over religious education, making it possible to have other types of instruction in some areas of Germany. A well-known example is the "instruction in Biblical history" in Bremen. It is not religious education in the sense of the Basic Law, because its content is not accountable to a religious order; therefore it is not a "common affair" (res mixta).
