= Enabling Act of 1802 =

American law establishing the state of Ohio

- Other short titles: Ohio Enabling Act
- Long title: An Act to enable the people of the Eastern division of the territory north-west of the river Ohio to form a constitution and State government, and for the admission of such State into the Union, on an equal footing with the original States, and for other purposes.
- Enacted by: the 7th United States Congress
- Effective: April 30, 1802

Citations
- Statutes at Large: 2 Stat. 173

Codification
- Acts amended: Northwest Ordinance (indirectly)

Legislative history
- Introduced in the House of Representatives; Passed the House of Representatives on April 9, 1802; Passed the Senate on April 1802; Signed into law by President Thomas Jefferson on April 30, 1802

The Enabling Act of 1802 was passed on April 30, 1802, by the Seventh Congress of the United States. This act authorized the residents of the eastern portion of the Northwest Territory to form the state of Ohio and join the U.S. on an equal footing with the other states. To accomplish this, and in doing so, the act also established the precedent and procedures for creation of future states in the western territories. The Enabling Act of 1802 would be the first appropriation by Congress for internal improvements in the country's interior.

== Establishment of Ohio ==
Ohio was the first state to be created out of the Northwest Territory, which had been established by the Northwest Ordinance on July 13, 1787, in an act of the Continental Congress under the Articles of Confederation. The Northwest Ordinance laid out the conditions for the development and creation of states from the territory. With the act of May 7, 1800, the eastern part of the Northwest Territory, Ohio was set off under a distinct territorial government, and the remainder was organized as the territory of Indiana. By 1802 Ohio, in the eastern division of the Northwest Territory, had reached a population of 60,000 and was entitled to begin the transition to statehood. The Enabling Act of 1802 set forth the legal mechanisms and authorized the people of Ohio to begin this process.

The act required the people of Ohio to elect a delegate for each 1,200 people to attend a constitutional convention. These delegates would meet in Chillicothe on November 1, 1802, and would decide by majority vote whether or not to form a constitution and state government, and, if so, either provide for the election of representatives for a constitutional convention or to proceed immediately with the matter.

The new constitution and government of Ohio was required only to be "republican, and not repugnant to the ordinance of the thirteenth of July, one thousand seven hundred and eighty-seven, between the original States and the people and States of the territory northwest of the river Ohio". The new state was to be equal in status to the existing states, and would have only one Representative to the United States House of Representatives until the next census. To help provide that equal status, section seven of the act offered three "propositions" to the convention for their free acceptance or rejection, which, if accepted, would be obligatory upon the United States; these granted certain lands held by the Federal government to the new state, notably those set aside for public schools, and provided that 5% of the proceeds from sale of Federal lands would fund creations of roads to and through Ohio.

The convention met from November 1 to 29; it agreed to form a state, accepted the several land-use proposals, and wrote the Ohio Constitution of 1802, which went into force without submission to popular vote. On February 19, 1803, Congress passed an act "providing for the execution of the laws of the United States in the State of Ohio" (Sess. 2, ch. 7, 2 Stat. 201). This act did not purport to admit the state, but declared that Ohio, by the formation of its constitution in pursuance of the act of April 30, 1802, "has become one of the United States of America." Neither act, however, set a formal date of statehood. An official statehood date for Ohio was not set until 1953, when the 83rd Congress passed a joint resolution "for admitting the State of Ohio into the Union", (Pub. L. 83–204, 67 Stat. 407, enacted August 7, 1953) which designated March 1, 1803, as that date.

== Significance and growth ==
Along with the extensively discussed topic of internal improvements, the entry of Ohio into the Union in 1803 raised the issue of whether the United States or Ohio should control the public lands in the territory. In a major precedent, the older states retained for the Union full sovereignty over these lands but agreed to allocate five percent of the net proceeds of land sales in Ohio for building roads to and through the state. The Enabling Act of 1802 specifically stated that the five-percent portion should,

be applied to the laying out and making public roads, leading from the navigable waters emptying into the Atlantic, to the Ohio, to the said State, and through the same, such roads to be laid out under the authority of Congress, with the consent of the several States through which the road shall pass.

This statement within the Enabling Act of 1802 foreshadowed the Cumberland Road, which was built to fulfill the promise to use a portion of the money accruing from the sale of public lands in Ohio in order to connect that young state with Atlantic waters; the road would be approved in 1806 and would later extend nearly to the Mississippi River.

In the act of March 3, 1803, which added and modified the propositions contained in the Enabling Act, 3 percent of the net proceeds of land sales was given to Ohio for roads within the State, and for no other purpose whatever.

Similar provisions for a grant of 5 percent of the net proceeds of the sales of public lands within each State have been made in the subsequent acts for the admission of the various public-land states to the Union. In the different acts there is some variation in the purposes for which the grants were made. The early acts usually made the appropriation for roads and canals; acts after 1836 made the proceeds available for roads and internal improvements; and the act for Nevada (1864) applied it to roads and irrigation ditches. Beginning with the four States admitted in 1889, the proceeds of this 5 per cent grant have been granted as a permanent fund for the support of common schools. Between 1802 and 1860, inclusive, this method of revenue sharing returned $5.4 million to the states; by 1887 the amounts accruing to the various States for the proceeds of the cash sales of public lands aggregated $7.1 million.

== See also ==
- An Act for the Admission of the State of California
- Organized incorporated territories of the United States
