= Unfair list =

List compiled by trade unions of unfair employers

An unfair list (strike list or do not work order) is a list compiled by trade unions of employers who have engaged in unfair or strike-worthy labor practices, including:

- Refusing to engage in collective bargaining negotiations with a trade union
- Refusing to sign applicable collective bargaining agreements (including MBAs)
- Failing to participate in grievance and arbitration procedures
- Failing to abide by the final award of an arbitrator
- Violating labor laws

Typically, for purposes of solidarity, union members are prohibited by union bylaws from engaging in a contract for the rendering of services to entities that are on the unfair list.
