= Oklahoma Enabling Act =

1906 United States federal territory and statehood legislation

- Other short titles: Statehood Act of 1906
- Long title: An Act to enable the people of Oklahoma and of the Indian Territory to form a constitution and State government and be admitted into the Union on an equal footing with the original States; and to enable the people of New Mexico and of Arizona to form a constitution and State government and be admitted into the Union on an equal footing with the original States.
- Nicknames: Oklahoma Enabling Act of 1906
- Enacted by: the 59th United States Congress
- Effective: June 16, 1906

Citations
- Public law: 59-234 (1st session)
- Statutes at Large: 34 Stat. 267

Codification
- Titles amended: 43 U.S.C.: Public Lands
- U.S.C. sections created: 43 U.S.C. ch. 22 § 944

Legislative history
- Introduced in the House as H.R. 12707 by Edward L. Hamilton (R–MI) on January 22, 1906; Committee consideration by House Committee on Territories, Senate Committee on Territories; Passed the House on January 25, 1906 (195-150); Passed the Senate on March 9, 1906 (42-29); Reported by the joint conference committee on June 13, 1906; agreed to by the House on June 14, 1906 (Agreed) and by the Senate on June 15, 1906 (Agreed); Signed into law by President Theodore Roosevelt on June 16, 1906

United States Supreme Court cases
- Sharp v. Murphy; McGirt v. Oklahoma

The Enabling Act of 1906, in its first part, empowered the people residing in Indian Territory and Oklahoma Territory to elect delegates to a state constitutional convention and subsequently to be admitted to the union as a single state.

The act, in its second part, also enabled the people of New Mexico Territory and of Arizona Territory to form a constitution and State government and be admitted into the Union, requiring a referendum to determine if both territories should be admitted as a single state.

== Background ==
The Oklahoma Organic Act of 1890 contemplated admitting Oklahoma and Indian Territories as a single state. However, residents of Indian Territory sponsored a bill to admit Indian Territory as the State of Sequoyah, which was defeated in the U.S. Congress in 1905. President Theodore Roosevelt then proposed a compromise that would join Indian Territory with Oklahoma Territory to form a single state. This resulted in passage of the Oklahoma Enabling Act, which President Roosevelt signed June 16, 1906.

== Requirements for the Oklahoma Constitution ==
The Act included several other requirements for the Oklahoma Constitution:

- Citizens of the U.S. or members of tribes who have been resident in the territories for at least six months may participate in the constitutional convention and vote in the referendum.
- The capital shall temporarily be in Guthrie, Oklahoma, until 1913, when a referendum shall determine a permanent capital.
- Provisions shall be made for a public school system, free from sectarian control and with classes conducted in English (provided that foreign languages may be taught).
  - Section 16 and 36 of surplus lands be reserved for the benefit of common schools
  - Section 13 of surplus lands be reserved for the benefit of higher education, reserving 1/3 for the University of Oklahoma, 1/3 for the Agricultural and Mechanical College and Colored Agricultural Normal School, and 1/3 for Normal Schools
- That said State shall never enact any law restricting or Right of suffrage or abridging the right of suffrage on account of race, color, or previous condition of servitude
- the Osage Indian Reservation be organized as a separate county in the new state
- Preservation of freedom of religion
- Prohibition of polygamy and plural marriage
- Prohibition of the manufacture, sale, barter or gift of liquor for 21 years after statehood
- "nothing contained in the said constitution shall be construed to limit or impair the rights of person or property pertaining to the Indians of said Territories (so long as such rights shall remain unextinguished) or to limit or affect the authority of the Government of the United States to make any law or regulation respecting such Indians, their lands, property, or other rights by treaties, agreement, law, or otherwise, which it would have been competent to make if this act had never been passed."

President Roosevelt proclaimed Oklahoma a state on November 16, 1907.

== Equal footing doctrine ==
The requirement to keep Guthrie as the State's temporary capital was challenged in court after Oklahoma City, Oklahoma, won the election and the capital was moved prematurely. Coyle v. Smith was the U.S. Supreme Court Case that helped define the equal footing doctrine.

On December 29, 1910, the state of Oklahoma enacted a statute which removed the state capital from Guthrie to Oklahoma City. W.H. Coyle, owner of large property interests in Guthrie, sued the state of Oklahoma, arguing that the move was performed in violation of the state constitution's acceptance of the terms of Congress's enabling act.

The power given to Congress by Art. IV, § 3, of the Constitution is to admit new States to this Union, and relates only to such States as are equal to each other in power and dignity and competency to exert the residuum of sovereignty not delegated to the Federal Government.

The Supreme Court held that preventing the state of Oklahoma the right to locate its own seat of government deprived it of powers which all other states of the Union enjoyed, and thus violated the traditional constitutional principle that all new states be admitted "on an equal footing with the original states". As a result, the provision of the enabling act which temporarily restricted Oklahoma's right to determine where its seat of government would be was unconstitutional.

== Enablement of Arizona and New Mexico statehood ==
The second part of the act provided for the enablement of the peoples of Arizona and New Mexico to form a state constitution and government in anticipation of admission to the union as a single state. However, the combined state was not admitted under these provisions; instead a separate act, the State Enablement Act of 1910, was enacted and was the statutory vehicle that led to their admissions as individual states.

== Failure to disestablish reservations ==
A pair of U.S. Supreme Court cases first originating around 2015 challenged part of the Oklahoma Enabling Act by asserting that the Act failed to actually disestablish the reservation lands for the purposes of determining whether a crime committed on those lands was of the state's jurisdiction, if they had been disestablished, or federal, if they remained reservations, under the Major Crimes Act. In July 2020, the Supreme Court ruled that Congress had failed to disestablish the reservations in the Enabling Act and so for purposes of the Major Crimes Act, those lands that were former reservations should be considered Indian country, overseen by federal jurisdiction.

== See also ==
- Former Indian Reservations in Oklahoma
