= Horace Harmon Lurton =

US Supreme Court justice from 1910 to 1914

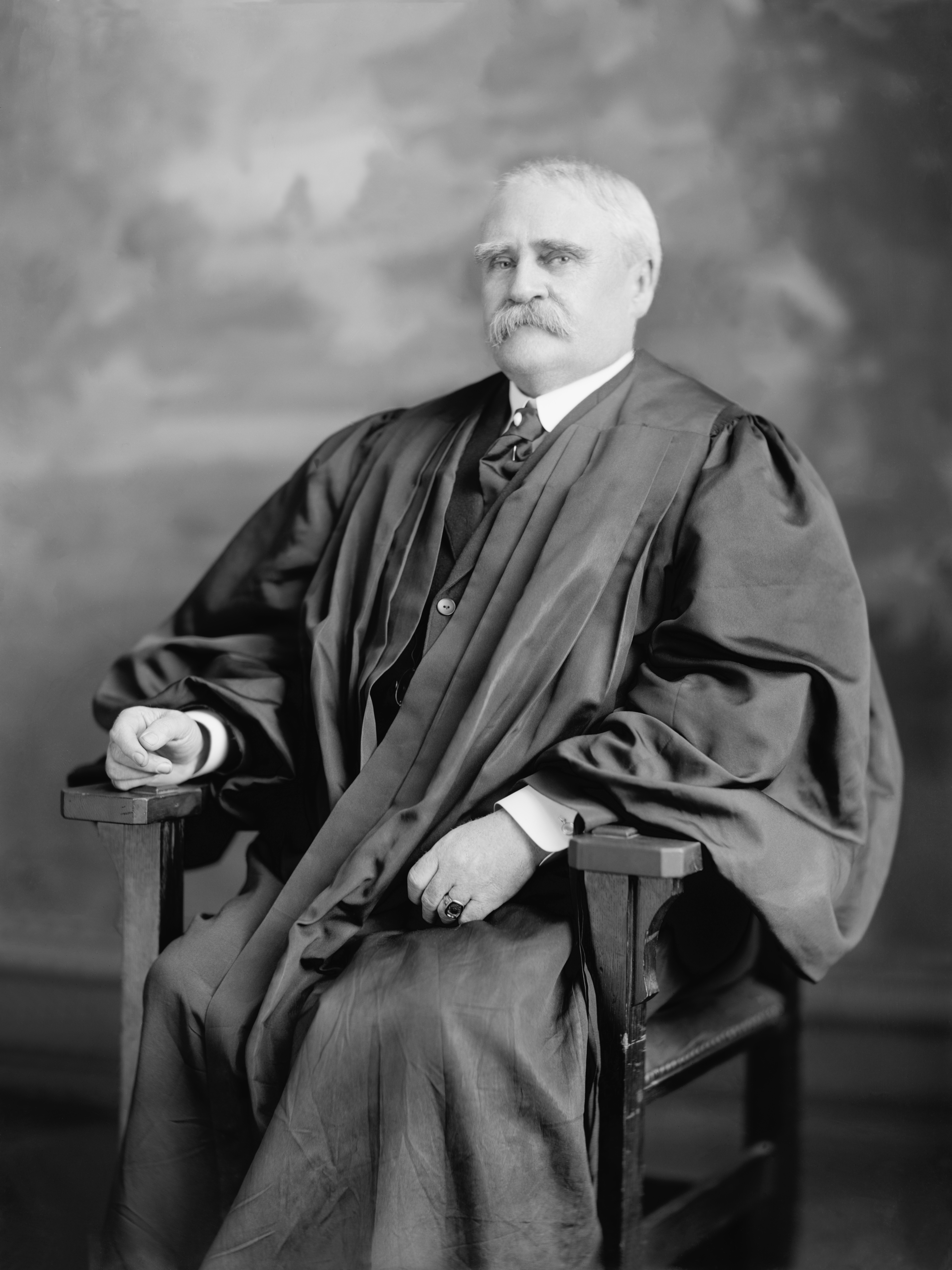
- Lurton, 1905–1914

Associate Justice of the Supreme Court of the United States
- In office January 3, 1910 – July 12, 1914
- Nominated by: William Howard Taft
- Preceded by: Rufus W. Peckham
- Succeeded by: James Clark McReynolds

Judge of the United States Court of Appeals for the Sixth Circuit
- In office March 27, 1893 – December 20, 1909
- Nominated by: Grover Cleveland
- Preceded by: Howell Edmunds Jackson
- Succeeded by: Loyal Edwin Knappen

Justice of the Supreme Court of Tennessee
- In office 1886–1893
- Nominated by: Parson Brownlow
- Preceded by: Newly constituted post-Reconstruction court
- Succeeded by: William King McAlister

Personal details
- Born: Horace Harmon Lurton; February 26, 1844 Newport, Kentucky, U.S.
- Died: July 12, 1914 (aged 70) Atlantic City, New Jersey, U.S.
- Cause of death: Heart attack
- Resting place: Greenwood Cemetery, Clarksville, Tennessee, U.S.
- Party: Democratic
- Education: Old University of Chicago; Cumberland School of Law (LLB)

Military service
- Allegiance: Confederate States
- Branch/service: Confederate States Army
- Years of service: 1861–1864
- Rank: Sergeant Major
- Unit: 5th Tennessee Infantry Regiment; 2nd Kentucky Infantry Regiment; 3rd Kentucky Cavalry
- Battles/wars: American Civil War

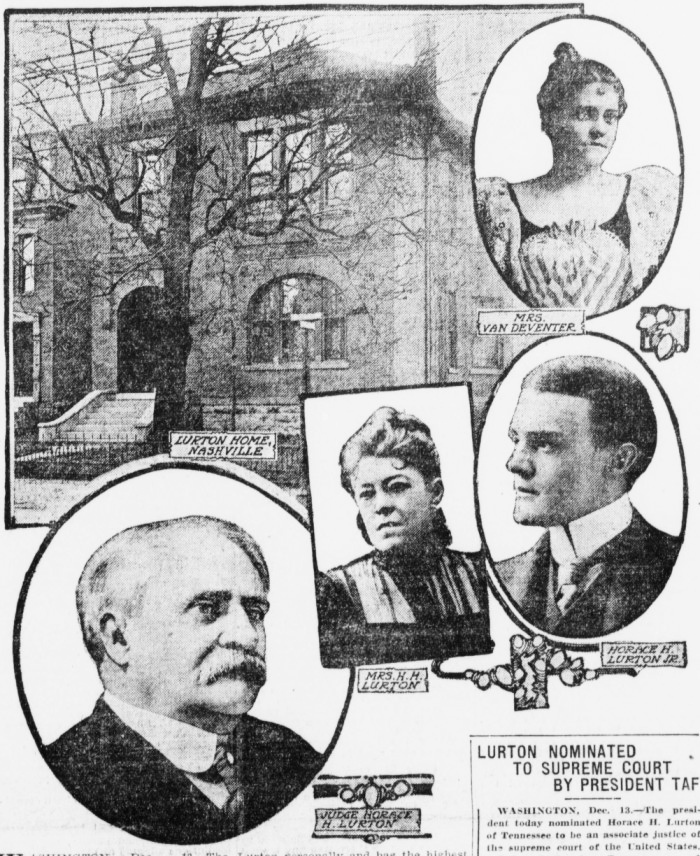
Justice Lurton, bottom left, with his home in Nashville, his wife, center, and children

Horace Harmon Lurton (February 26, 1844 – July 12, 1914) was an Associate Justice of the Supreme Court of the United States and previously was a United States circuit judge of the United States Court of Appeals for the Sixth Circuit and of the United States Circuit Courts for the Sixth Circuit.

== Early life ==
Lurton was born on February 26, 1844, in Newport, Kentucky. He attended the Old University of Chicago, (Note: Lurton's Federal Judicial Center biography indicates he attended "Douglas University", which actually was a pejorative term for the Old University of Chicago, stemming from Stephen Douglas's involvement with the institution.) then received a Bachelor of Laws in 1867 from Cumberland School of Law (then part of Cumberland University, now part of Samford University).

He served in the Confederate States Army as a Sergeant Major with the 5th Tennessee Infantry at the age of 17, left for ill health, and later served as a private in the 2nd Kentucky Infantry and 3rd Kentucky Cavalry from 1862 to 1865. He was twice captured by Union forces, the second time sent as a prisoner of war to Johnson's Island Prison Camp in Sandusky Bay, Ohio. He claimed he was later paroled by President Lincoln because of pleas for mercy from his mother but this was merely an anecdote he often repeated to dinner guests, according to historian Roger Long. Mr. Long explains in detail what the evidence shows in an article he wrote in the December 1994 edition of Civil War Times. According to Mr. Long, apparently he was paroled from Johnson's Island only when he signed the oath of allegiance, not because of any act of the president. Mr Long's article includes interesting details about Lurton's service as well as possible reasons for the anecdote he was so fond of repeating.

He entered private practice in Clarksville, Tennessee from 1867 to 1875. He was Chancellor for the Tennessee Chancery Court for the Sixth Judicial District from 1875 to 1878. He resumed private practice in Clarksville from 1878 to 1886. He was a justice of the Tennessee Supreme Court from 1886 to 1893. On January 17, 1893, Lurton was elected chief justice of the Court to succeed Peter Turney, but he only served in that position for two months.

== U.S. Circuit Court ==
Lurton was nominated by President Grover Cleveland on March 22, 1893, to a joint seat on the United States Court of Appeals for the Sixth Circuit and the United States Circuit Courts for the Sixth Circuit vacated by Judge Howell Edmunds Jackson. He was confirmed by the United States Senate on March 27, 1893, and received his commission the same day. His service terminated on December 20, 1909, due to his elevation to the Supreme Court.

Concurrent with his service on the Sixth Circuit, Lurton served as Dean of the law department of Vanderbilt University from 1905 to 1909.

== U.S. Supreme Court ==
On December 13, 1909, President William Howard Taft nominated Lurton as an associate justice of the United States Supreme Court, to succeed Rufus W. Peckham. He was confirmed by the Senate on December 20, 1909, and was sworn into office on January 3, 1910. At 65 years old at the time of his initial appointment in 1909, he was the oldest associate justice ever by initial appointment.

He was Circuit Justice for the Second Circuit from January 10, 1910, until January 8, 1911, Circuit Justice for the Third Circuit from January 9, 1911, until March 17, 1912, and Circuit Justice for the Seventh Circuit from March 18, 1912, until July 12, 1914. His service terminated on July 12, 1914, due to his death in Atlantic City, New Jersey.

Lurton sided most frequently on the court with Associate Justice Oliver Wendell Holmes Jr., a progressive Supreme Court justice. The most notable opinion he authored was probably the opinion of the Court in Coyle v. Smith, 221 U.S. 559 (1911), which held that the federal government could not tell a state where to locate its capital, as all states must be on "equal footing."

== Death ==
Lurton's tenure on the Court was brief, as he served only four years before dying in Atlantic City, New Jersey of a heart attack on July 12, 1914. He is buried in Greenwood Cemetery in Clarksville, Tennessee.

== Legacy and honors ==
During World War II the Liberty ship SS Horace H. Lurton was built in Brunswick, Georgia, and named in his honor.

== See also ==
- List of justices of the Supreme Court of the United States

== Notes ==
Legal offices
Preceded by Howell Edmunds Jackson	Judge of the United States Circuit Courts for the Sixth Circuit; 1893–1909	Succeeded by Loyal Edwin Knappen
Preceded by Howell Edmunds Jackson	Judge of the United States Court of Appeals for the Sixth Circuit; 1893–1909	Succeeded by Loyal Edwin Knappen
Preceded by Rufus W. Peckham	Associate Justice of the Supreme Court of the United States; 1910–1914	Succeeded by James Clark McReynolds
