= List of Michigan state legislatures =

The legislature of the U.S. state of Michigan has convened many times since statehood became effective on January 26, 1837.

== Legislatures ==
Name	Start date	End date	Last election
Michigan State Constitution of 1835
1st Michigan Legislature	November 2, 1835	July 26, 1836	October 5, 1835
2nd Michigan Legislature	January 2, 1837	December 30, 1837	November 7, 1836
3rd Michigan Legislature	January 1, 1838	April 6, 1838	November 6, 1837
4th Michigan Legislature	January 7, 1839	April 20, 1839	November 5, 1838
5th Michigan Legislature	January 6, 1840	April 1, 1840	November 1839
6th Michigan Legislature	January 4, 1841	April 13, 1841	November 1840
7th Michigan Legislature	January 3, 1842	February 17, 1842	November 1841
8th Michigan Legislature	January 2, 1843	March 9, 1843	November 1842
9th Michigan Legislature	January 1, 1844	March 12, 1844	November 1843
10th Michigan Legislature	January 6, 1845	March 24, 1845	November 1844
11th Michigan Legislature	January 5, 1846	May 18, 1846	November 1845
12th Michigan Legislature	January 4, 1847	March 17, 1847	November 1846
13th Michigan Legislature	January 3, 1848	April 3, 1848	November 1847
14th Michigan Legislature	January 1, 1849	April 2, 1849	November 1848
15th Michigan Legislature	January 7, 1850	April 2, 1850	November 1849
16th Michigan Legislature	February 5, 1851	June 28, 1851	November 5, 1850
Michigan State Constitution of 1850
17th Michigan Legislature	January 5, 1853	February 14, 1853	November 2, 1852
18th Michigan Legislature	January 3, 1855	February 13, 1855	November 1854
19th Michigan Legislature	January 7, 1857	February 4, 1858	November 1856
20th Michigan Legislature	January 5, 1859	February 16, 1859	November 1858
21st Michigan Legislature	January 2, 1861	January 20, 1862	November 1860
22nd Michigan Legislature	January 7, 1863	February 6, 1864	November 1862
23rd Michigan Legislature	January 4, 1865	March 23, 1865	November 1864
24th Michigan Legislature	January 2, 1867	March 28, 1867	November 1866
25th Michigan Legislature	January 6, 1869	August 10, 1870	November 1868
26th Michigan Legislature	January 4, 1871	May 24, 1872	November 1870
27th Michigan Legislature	January 1, 1873	March 26, 1874	November 1872
28th Michigan Legislature	January 6, 1875	May 4, 1875	November 1874
29th Michigan Legislature	January 3, 1877	May 22, 1877	November 1876
30th Michigan Legislature	January 1, 1879	May 31, 1879	November 1878
31st Michigan Legislature	January 5, 1881	March 14, 1882	November 1880
32nd Michigan Legislature	January 3, 1883	June 9, 1883	November 1882
33rd Michigan Legislature	January 7, 1885	June 20, 1885	November 1884
34th Michigan Legislature	January 5, 1887	June 29, 1887	November 1886
35th Michigan Legislature	January 2, 1889	July 3, 1889	November 1888
36th Michigan Legislature	January 7, 1891	August 8, 1892	November 1890
37th Michigan Legislature	January 4, 1893	May 29, 1893	November 1892
38th Michigan Legislature	January 2, 1895	May 31, 1895	November 1894
39th Michigan Legislature	January 6, 1897	April 13, 1898	November 1896
40th Michigan Legislature	January 4, 1899	December 22, 1900	November 1898
41st Michigan Legislature	January 2, 1901	June 6, 1901	November 1900
42nd Michigan Legislature	January 7, 1903	June 18, 1903	November 1902
43rd Michigan Legislature	January 4, 1905	June 17, 1905	November 1904
44th Michigan Legislature	January 2, 1907	October 26, 1907	November 1906
Michigan State Constitution of 1908
45th Michigan Legislature	January 6, 1909	June 2, 1909	November 1908
46th Michigan Legislature	January 4, 1911	April 10, 1912	November 1910
47th Michigan Legislature	January 1913	December 1914	November 1912
48th Michigan Legislature	January 1915	1916	November 1914
49th Michigan Legislature	January 1917	1918	November 1916
50th Michigan Legislature	January 1919	1920	November 1918
51st Michigan Legislature	January 1921	1922	November 1920
52nd Michigan Legislature	January 1923	1924	November 1922
53rd Michigan Legislature	January 1925	1926	November 1924
54th Michigan Legislature	January 1927	1928	November 1926
55th Michigan Legislature	January 1929	1930	November 1928
56th Michigan Legislature	January 1931	1932	November 1930
57th Michigan Legislature	January 1933	1934	November 1932
58th Michigan Legislature	January 1935	1936	November 1934
59th Michigan Legislature	January 1937	1938	November 1936
60th Michigan Legislature	January 1939	1940	November 1938
61st Michigan Legislature	January 1941	1942	November 1940
62nd Michigan Legislature	January 1943	1944	November 1942
63rd Michigan Legislature	January 1945	1946	November 1944
64th Michigan Legislature	January 1947	1948	November 1946
65th Michigan Legislature	January 1949	1950	November 1948
66th Michigan Legislature	January 1951	1952	November 1950
67th Michigan Legislature	January 1953	1954	November 1952
68th Michigan Legislature	January 1955	1956	November 1954
69th Michigan Legislature	January 1957	1958	November 1956
70th Michigan Legislature	January 1959	1960	November 1958
71st Michigan Legislature	January 1961	1962	November 1960
72nd Michigan Legislature	January 1963	1964	November 1962
Michigan State Constitution of 1963
73rd Michigan Legislature	January 1965	1966	November 1964
74th Michigan Legislature	January 1967	1968	November 1966
75th Michigan Legislature	January 1969	1970	November 1968
76th Michigan Legislature	January 1971	1972	November 1970
77th Michigan Legislature	January 1973	1974	November 1972
78th Michigan Legislature	January 1975	1976	November 1974
79th Michigan Legislature	January 1977	1978	November 1976
80th Michigan Legislature	January 1979	1980	November 1978
81st Michigan Legislature	January 1981	1982	November 1980
82nd Michigan Legislature	January 1983	1984	November 1982
83rd Michigan Legislature	January 1985	1986	November 1984
84th Michigan Legislature	January 1987	1988	November 1986
85th Michigan Legislature	January 1989	1990	November 1988
86th Michigan Legislature	January 1991	1992	November 1990
87th Michigan Legislature	January 1993	1994	November 1992
88th Michigan Legislature	January 1995	1996	November 1994
89th Michigan Legislature	January 1997	1998	November 1996
90th Michigan Legislature	January 1999	2000	November 1998
91st Michigan Legislature	January 2001	2002	November 2000
92nd Michigan Legislature	January 2003	2004	November 2002
93rd Michigan Legislature	January 2005	2006	November 2004
94th Michigan Legislature	January 2007	2008	November 2006
95th Michigan Legislature	January 2009	2010	November 2008
96th Michigan Legislature	January 2011	2012	November 2011
97th Michigan Legislature	January 2013	2014	November 2012
98th Michigan Legislature	January 2015	2016	November 2014
99th Michigan Legislature	January 2017	2018	November 2016
100th Michigan Legislature	January 2019	2020	November 2018
101st Michigan Legislature	January 2021	2022	November 2020
102nd Michigan Legislature	January 2023	2024	November 2022
103rd Michigan Legislature	January 2025		November 2024

== See also ==
- List of speakers of the Michigan House of Representatives
- List of majority leaders of the Michigan Senate
- List of governors of Michigan
- Politics of Michigan
- Elections in Michigan
- Michigan State Capitol
- Timeline of Michigan history
- Lists of United States state legislative sessions
