= Green Party of Michigan =

Political party

- Founded: 1996
- Headquarters: PO Box 2754, Grand Rapids, Michigan 49501
- Ideology: Green politics
- Political position: Left-wing
- National affiliation: Green Party of the United States
- Colors: Green
- Michigan House of Representatives: 0 / 110
- Michigan Senate: 0 / 38

Website
- Green Party of Michigan

The Green Party of Michigan is a political party in Michigan. It is the state affiliate of the Green Party of the United States (GPUS). The party has had ballot access in Michigan since November 2000, when their presidential candidate, Ralph Nader, captured 2.74% of the national vote and 2% in Michigan. In 2016, the Green Party of Michigan elected five officers to local governments.

In Michigan, the Green Party elected a candidate to office in its first year. That candidate was JoAnne Beemon who became the first Green elected in Michigan, when on election day 2000 she received 5,349 votes (86%) to become Drain Commissioner in Charlevoix County. Beemon was credited with thwarting construction of a Wal-Mart store, by formulating storm water runoff regulations stricter than the county stormwater ordinance. She informed Wal-Mart of this on February 12, 2004. Two months later in a phone call to Beemon on April 6, 2004, Wal-Mart project manager Allen Oertel acknowledged that the company altered its plan based on information from Beemon that it did not previously know of. Wal-Mart later ended the project. The Michigan party is a member of the Michigan Third Parties Coalition.

== Elected Officials ==
In 2016, the Green Party of Michigan saw five candidates get elected to office:

- Korie Blyveis - Newberg Twp Clerk (Cass Co)
- Tom Mair - Grand Traverse Co Board/District 2
- Jesse Torres - Holly Twp Park Commissioner
- Stuart Collis - Ypsilanti Twp Park Commissioner
- Shauna McNally - Ypsilanti Twp Park Commissioner

== 2018 slate of candidates ==
sources:

- Jennifer V Kurland – Governor
- Charin Davenport – Lieutenant Governor
- Marcia Squier – US Senate
- John V. McDermott – US House/9th District
- Harley Mikkelson – US House/10th District
- D. Etta Wilcoxon – US House/13th District
- Rev. David Bullock – State Senate/1st District
- Jessicia Smith – State Senate/14th District
- Eric James Borregard – State Senate/22nd District
- Robert Alway – State Senate/26th District
- Wade Roberts – State Senate/38th District
- John Anthony La Pietra – State House/63rd District
- Robin Lea Laurain – State House/68th District
- Jacob Straley – State House/75th District
- Sherry A Wells – State Board of Education
- Kevin A. Graves – U-M Board of Regents
- Aaron Mariasy – MSU Board of Trustees
- Gina Luster – Genesee County Board/District 2
- Tom Mair – Grand Traverse County Board/District 2
- Charlotte Aikens – Kent County Board/District 12
- Mitchell Bonga – Warren Woods School Board (non-partisan)

== 2014 and 2016 slate of candidates ==
Nominated at 2014 State Convention:

- Paul Homeniuk – Governor
- Candace Caveny – Lieutenant Governor
- John Anthony La Pietra – Attorney General
- Chris Wahmhoff – US Senator
- Ellis Boal – US Representative/1st District
- Tonya Duncan – US Representative/3rd District
- John M. Lawrence – US Representative/6th District
- Jim Casha – US Representative/8th District
- John V. McDermott – US Representative/9th District
- Harley Mikkelson – US Representative/10th District
- Stephen Boyle – US Representative/14th District
- Sherry A. Wells – State Board of Education
- Ian Swanson – U of M Board of Regents
- Terry Link – MSU Board of Trustees
- Adam Adrianson – MSU Board of Trustees
- Margaret Guttshall – Wayne St U Bd of Governors
- Latham T. Redding – Wayne St U Bd of Governors
- Tom Mair – Grand Traverse County Board/2nd District
- Wayne Vermilya – Presque Isle County Board/1st District

Endorsed at State Convention (running for non-partisan office):

- Eric Borregard – Washtenaw Community College Board
- Joe Connolly – Northwest Michigan College Board

Nominated at County Caucuses:

- Sarah Molenaar – Kalamazoo County Board/1st District
- Fred Vitale – Wayne County Board/1st District

Nominated at 2016 State Convention:

- Ellis Boal - US House/1st District
- Matthew A. Brady - US House/2nd District
- Jordan Salvi - US House/4th District
- Harley Mikkelson - US House/5th District
- Maria Green - US House/8th District
- John V. McDermott - US House/9th District
- Benjamin Nofs - US House/10th District
- Dylan Calewarts - US House/12th District
- Marcia Squier - US House/14th District
- Dan Finn - State House/4th District
- Tiffany Hayden - State House/11th District
- Artelia Marie Leak - State House/29th District
- Eric Borregard - State House/52nd District
- Joseph Stevens - State House/53rd District
- John Anthony La Pietra - State House/63rd District
- Michael Anderson - State House/70th District
- Deena Marie Bruderick - State House/83rd District
- Cliff Yankovich - State House/86th District
- Wade Roberts - State House/109th District
- Sherry A. Wells - State Board of Education
- Derek Grigsby - State Board of Education
- Latham Redding - U of M Board of Regents
- Will Tyler White - MSU Board of Trustees
- Margaret Guttshall - WSU Board of Governors
- Fran Shor - WSU Board of Governors

Candidates endorsed for local races:

- Korie Blyveis - Newberg Twp Clerk (Cass Co) (won)
- Celeste Bondie - Emmet County Board/District 4
- Veda Balla - Genesee County Commission, District 4
- Tom Mair - Grand Traverse Co Board/District 2 (won)
- Jesse Torres - Holly Twp Park Commissioner (Oakland County) (won)
- Wayne Vermilya - Presque Isle Co Board/District 1
- Stuart Collis - Ypsilanti Twp Park Commissioner (Washtenaw County) (won)
- Shauna McNally - Ypsilanti Twp Park Commissioner (Washtenaw County) (won)
- Eric Siegel - Oakland Community College Board of Trustees

== See also ==
- Libertarian Party of Michigan
- Natural Law Party
- Politics of Michigan
- Government of Michigan
- Elections in Michigan
- Political party strength in Michigan
- Law of Michigan
- List of politics by U.S. state
