= List of Michigan ballot proposals =

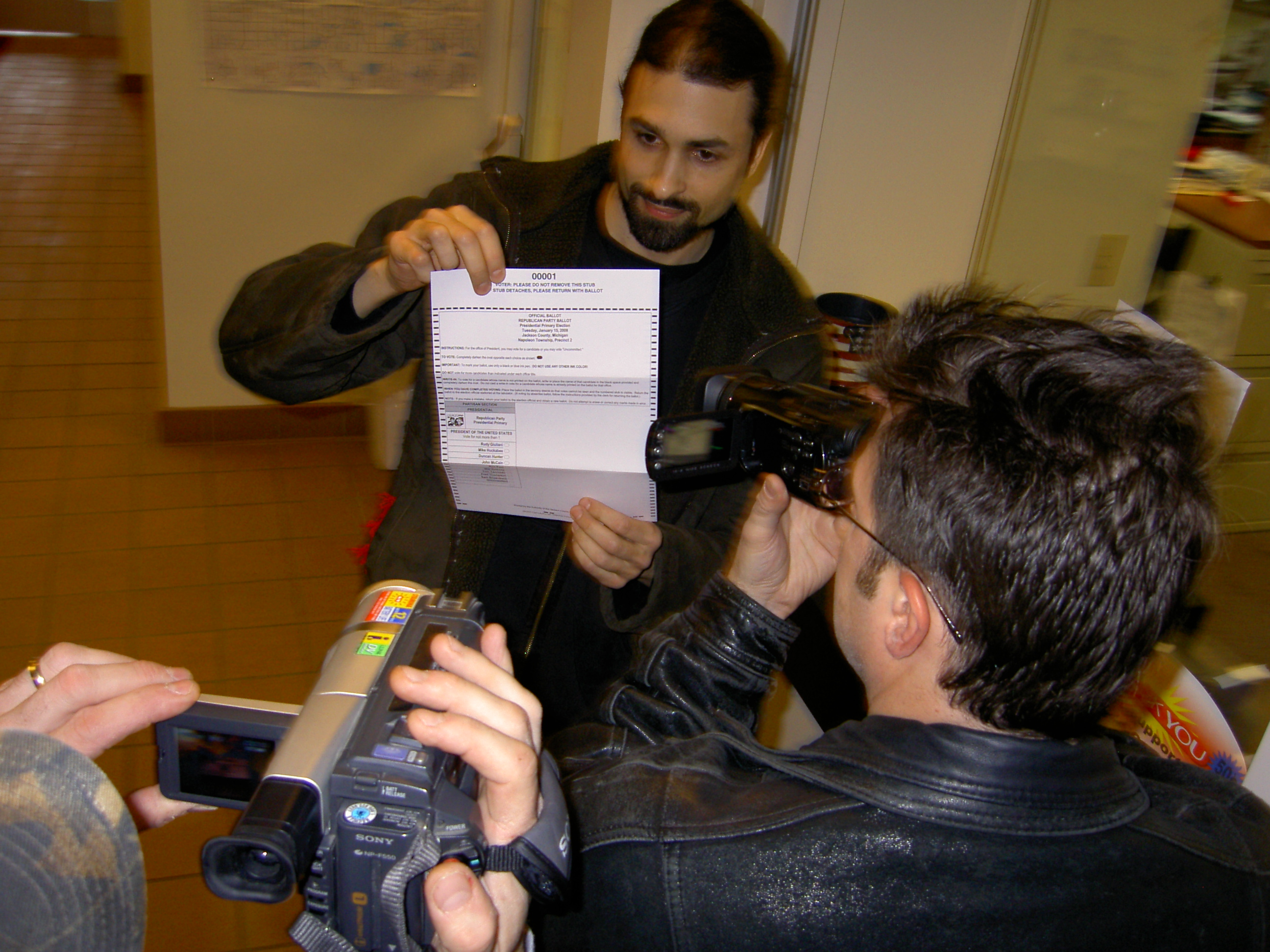
Voter displaying a 2008 Michigan primary election ballot

The following is a list of statewide initiatives and referendums modifying state law and proposing state constitutional amendments in Michigan, sorted by election.

== 1835–1899 ==
=== 1835 ===
Proposal name	Description	Status	Yes votes	No votes
Constitutional Question	A question as to whether to adopt the 1835 Constitution of Michigan	Passed	6,752 (83.09%)	1,374 (16.91%)

=== 1850 ===
Proposal name	Description	Status	Yes votes	No votes
Constitutional Question	A question as to whether to adopt the 1850 Constitution of Michigan	Passed	36,169 (79.31%)	9,433 (20.69%)
Proposal 1	A constitutional amendment relating to equal suffrage for African-Americans	Failed	12,840 (28.62%)	32,026 (71.38%)

=== 1858 ===
Proposal name	Description	Status	Yes votes	No votes
Proposal 1	A measure relating to general banking laws	Passed	41,006 (67.37%)	19,865 (32.63%)

=== 1860 ===
Proposal name	Description	Status	Yes votes	No votes
Proposal 1	A constitutional amendment relating to the regulation of banking corporations	Passed	59,954 (79.48%)	15,477 (20.52%)
Proposal 2	A constitutional amendment relating to sessions of the Michigan Legislature	Passed	53,152 (74.44%)	18,246 (25.56%)
Proposal 3	A constitutional amendment relating to eminent domain	Passed	62,936 (88.65%)	8,054 (11.35%)

=== 1862 ===
Proposal name	Description	Status	Yes votes	No votes
Proposal 1	A constitutional amendment relating to the removal of public officials from office	Passed	3,180 (71.41%)	1,273 (28.59%)
Proposal 2	A constitutional amendment relating to the regulation of banks	Passed	5,067 (75.50%)	1,644 (24.50%)
Proposal 3	A constitutional amendment relating to the selection of university regents	Passed	4,363 (69.65%)	1,901 (30.35%)
Proposal 4	A constitutional amendment relating to the administration of elections in the Upper Peninsula	Passed	5,193 (78.29%)	1,440 (21.71%)
Proposal 5	A constitutional amendment relating to future constitutional amendments	Passed	4,375 (70.78%)	1,806 (29.22%)

=== 1866 ===
Proposal name	Description	Status	Yes votes	No votes
Proposal 1	A constitutional amendment relating to the ability of soldiers to vote	Passed	86,354 (86.83%)	13,094 (13.17%)
Proposal 2	A proposal calling for a constitutional convention	Passed	79,505 (73.53%)	28,623 (26.47%)

=== 1868 ===
Proposal name	Description	Status	Yes votes	No votes
Proposal 1	A constitutional amendment relating to sessions of the Michigan Legislature	Failed	24,482 (19.62%)	100,314 (80.38%)
Proposal 2	A constitutional amendment relating to alcohol prohibition	Failed	72,462 (45.69%)	86,143 (54.31%)
Constitutional Question	A question as to whether to adopt the 1868 Constitution of Michigan	Failed	71,733 (39.35%)	110,582 (60.65%)

=== 1870 ===
Proposal name	Description	Status	Yes votes	No votes
Proposal 1	A constitutional amendment relating to the power of county boards of supervisors	Failed	39,180 (38.76%)	61,904 (61.24%)
Proposal 2	A constitutional amendment relating to the salaries of state government officials	Failed	36,109 (34.38%)	68,912 (65.62%)
Proposal 3	A constitutional amendment relating to equal suffrage for African-Americans	Passed	54,105 (51.67%)	50,598 (48.33%)
Proposal 4	A constitutional amendment relating to railroad rates	Passed	78,602 (60.46%)	51,397 (39.54%)
Proposal 5	A constitutional amendment relating to rail monopolies	Passed	76,912 (60.04%)	51,194 (39.96%)
Proposal 6	A constitutional amendment relating to government aid for railroads in the form of bonds	Failed	50,078 (38.96%)	78,453 (61.04%)

=== 1872 ===
Proposal name	Description	Status	Yes votes	No votes
Proposal 1	A constitutional amendment relating to government aid for railroads in the form of bonds	Failed	44,684 (38.66%)	70,893 (61.34%)
Proposal 2	A constitutional amendment relating to the structure of the circuit courts in Michigan	Failed	47,972 (42.15%)	65,848 (57.85%)
Proposal 3	A constitutional amendment relating to salaries for circuit court judges	Failed	57,326 (49.29%)	58,987 (50.71%)

=== 1874 ===
Proposal name	Description	Status	Yes votes	No votes
Proposal 1	A constitutional amendment relating to equal suffrage for women	Failed	40,077 (22.77%)	135,957 (77.23%)
Constitutional Question	A question as to whether to adopt the 1874 Constitution of Michigan	Failed	39,285 (24.05%)	124,034 (75.95%)

=== 1876 ===
Proposal name	Description	Status	Yes votes	No votes
Proposal 1	A constitutional amendment relating to liquor licenses	Passed	60,639 (53.57%)	52,561 (46.43%)
Proposal 2	A constitutional amendment relating to salaries for circuit court judges	Failed	65,371 (49.77%)	65,966 (50.23%)
Proposal 3	A constitutional amendment modifying the timeframe to submit constitutional amendments	Passed	52,306 (70.41%)	21,984 (29.59%)

=== 1878 ===
Proposal name	Description	Status	Yes votes	No votes
Proposal 1	A constitutional amendment modifying the position of Clerk of the Michigan Supreme Court	Failed	30,313 (46.62%)	34,712 (53.38%)
Proposal 2	A constitutional amendment relating to corporation stockholder's liability	Failed	24,770 (37.06%)	42,064 (62.94%)

=== 1880 ===
Proposal name	Description	Status	Yes votes	No votes
Proposal 1 (April)	A constitutional amendment relating to the salary of the Governor of Michigan	Failed	49,035 (34.83%)	91,753 (65.17%)
Proposal 2 (November)	A constitutional amendment relating to the construction of a river crossing in Detroit	Failed	37,340 (39.15%)	58,040 (60.85%)

=== 1881 ===
Proposal name	Description	Status	Yes votes	No votes
Proposal 1	A constitutional amendment relating to fines for libraries and schools	Passed	51,475 (86.01%)	8,370 (13.99%)
Proposal 2	A constitutional amendment relating to the position of court clerk	Passed	62,593 (90.41%)	6,640 (9.59%)
Proposal 3	A constitutional amendment relating to the circuit court system	Passed	53,840 (89.04%)	6,628 (10.96%)

=== 1882 ===
Proposal name	Description	Status	Yes votes	No votes
Proposal 1	A constitutional amendment relating to salaries for circuit court judges	Passed	85,705 (60.64%)	55,638 (39.36%)
Proposal 2	A constitutional amendment relating to boards of county auditors	Failed	23,814 (38.48%)	38,073 (61.52%)
Proposal 3	A proposal calling for a constitutional convention	Failed	20,937 (37.35%)	35,123 (62.65%)

=== 1884 ===
Proposal name	Description	Status	Yes votes	No votes
Proposal 1	A constitutional amendment relating to salaries for circuit court judges	Passed	35,345 (55.24%)	28,642 (44.76%)
Proposal 2	A constitutional amendment relating to salaries for state legislators	Failed	31,693 (37.55%)	52,707 (62.45%)

=== 1886 ===
Proposal name	Description	Status	Yes votes	No votes
Proposal 1	A constitutional amendment relating to the Wayne County board of auditors	Failed	15,020 (41.98%)	20,755 (58.02%)
Proposal 2	A constitutional amendment relating to salaries for public officials	Failed	40,445 (40.18%)	60,220 (59.82%)

=== 1887 ===
Proposal name	Description	Status	Yes votes	No votes
Proposal 1	A constitutional amendment relating to the sale of alcohol	Failed	178,636 (49.22%)	184,281 (50.78%)
Proposal 2	A constitutional amendment relating to salaries for public officials	Failed	72,718 (36.81%)	124,838 (63.19%)

=== 1888 ===
Proposal name	Description	Status	Yes votes	No votes
Proposal 1	A constitutional amendment relating to circuit courts	Passed	21,221 (52.26%)	19,382 (47.74%)
Proposal 2	A question relating to banking regulation	Passed	48,531 (70.51%)	20,300 (29.49%)

=== 1889 ===
Proposal name	Description	Status	Yes votes	No votes
Proposal 1	A constitutional amendment relating to circuit courts	Passed	49,478 (58.38%)	35,269 (41.62%)
Proposal 2	A constitutional amendment relating to corporations	Failed	35,269 (54.92%)	28,950 (45.08%)
Proposal 3	A constitutional amendment relating to the salary of the Governor of Michigan	Passed	111,854 (60.68%)	72,494 (39.32%)

=== 1890 ===
Proposal name	Description	Status	Yes votes	No votes
Proposal 1	A proposal calling for a constitutional convention	Failed	16,431 (38.49%)	26,261 (61.51%)

=== 1891 ===
Proposal name	Description	Status	Yes votes	No votes
Proposal 1	A constitutional amendment relating to the salary of the Michigan Attorney General	Failed	69,248 (49.85%)	69,651 (50.15%)

=== 1892 ===
Proposal name	Description	Status	Yes votes	No votes
Proposal 1	A proposal calling for a constitutional convention	Failed (Note: The proposal needed a majority of all votes (468,637) cast in the election to pass)	16,948 (51.06%)	16,245 (48.94%)

=== 1893 ===
Proposal name	Description	Status	Yes votes	No votes
Proposal 1	A constitutional amendment relating to the salaries of public officials	Failed	59,317 (45.60%)	70,772 (54.40%)
Proposal 2	A constitutional amendment relating to internal government improvements	Passed	72,745 (58.09%)	52,476 (41.91%)
Proposal 3	A constitutional amendment relating to the jurisdiction of circuit courts	Passed	62,023 (55.97%)	48,797 (44.03%)
Proposal 4	A constitutional amendment relating to highway commissioners	Passed	69,050 (53.54%)	59,922 (46.46%)

=== 1894 ===
Proposal name	Description	Status	Yes votes	No votes
Proposal 1	A constitutional amendment relating to voting rights	Passed	127,758 (81.19%)	29,607 (18.81%)
Proposal 2	A constitutional amendment relating to minimum qualifications for electors	Passed	117,088 (78.78%)	31,537 (21.22%)

=== 1895 ===
Proposal name	Description	Status	Yes votes	No votes
Proposal 1	A constitutional amendment relating to the salaries of public officials	Failed	50,065 (26.47%)	139,039 (73.53%)
Proposal 2	A constitutional amendment relating to circuit courts	Failed	60,567 (39.63%)	92,278 (60.37%)

=== 1897 ===
Proposal name	Description	Status	Yes votes	No votes
Proposal 1	A constitutional amendment relating to the salary of the Michigan Attorney General	Failed	70,138 (43.53%)	90,973 (56.47%)
Proposal 2	A constitutional amendment relating to the Kent County board of auditors	Failed	53,201 (47.93%)	57,793 (52.07%)

=== 1898 ===
Proposal name	Description	Status	Yes votes	No votes
Proposal 1	A proposal calling for a constitutional convention	Failed (Note: The proposal needed a majority of all votes (421,164) cast in the election to pass)	162,163 (56.05%)	127,147 (43.95%)

=== 1899 ===
Proposal name	Description	Status	Yes votes	No votes
Proposal 1	A constitutional amendment relating to highway improvements	Passed	130,416 (58.26%)	93,442 (41.74%)
Proposal 2	A constitutional amendment adding additional circuit court judges	Passed	108,197 (50.78%)	104,884 (49.22%)
Proposal 3	A constitutional amendment relating to intermediate courts	Failed	99,391 (49.29%)	102,269 (50.71%)
Proposal 4	A constitutional amendment relating to the state printing office	Failed	105,711 (49.39%)	108,317 (50.61%)

== 1900–1949 ==
=== 1900 ===
Proposal name	Description	Status	Yes votes	No votes
Proposal 1	A constitutional amendment relating to corporate taxes	Passed	442,728 (88.99%)	54,757 (11.01%)

=== 1901 ===
Proposal name	Description	Status	Yes votes	No votes
Proposal 1	A constitutional amendment relating to the salaries of state legislators	Failed	112,883 (37.57%)	187,615 (62.43%)
Proposal 2	A constitutional amendment adding additional circuit court judges	Failed	110,855 (46.00%)	130,108 (54.00%)

=== 1902 ===
Proposal name	Description	Status	Yes votes	No votes
Proposal 1	A constitutional amendment relating to the publication of new laws	Passed	155,837 (59.69%)	105,241 (40.31%)
Proposal 2	A constitutional amendment relating to "indeterminate sentence"	Passed	146,265 (65.12%)	78,338 (34.88%)

=== 1903 ===
Proposal name	Description	Status	Yes votes	No votes
Proposal 1	A constitutional amendment relating to the salaries of circuit court judges	Passed	105,618 (55.98%)	83,048 (44.02%)
Proposal 2	A constitutional amendment relating to boards of county auditors	Passed	108,889 (56.27%)	84,636 (43.73%)

=== 1904 ===
Proposal name	Description	Status	Yes votes	No votes
Proposal 1	A proposal calling for a constitutional convention	Failed (Note: The proposal needed a majority of all votes (524,721) cast in the election to pass)	165,123 (57.91%)	120,018 (42.09%)
Proposal 2	A constitutional amendment relating to the introduction of bills	Passed	180,157 (64.62%)	98,657 (35.38%)

=== 1905 ===
Proposal name	Description	Status	Yes votes	No votes
Proposal 1	A constitutional amendment relating to public wagon roads	Passed	205,750 (76.41%)	63,506 (23.59%)
Proposal 2	A constitutional amendment relating to the Genesee County board of auditors	Passed	94,860 (59.40%)	64,825 (40.60%)
Proposal 3	A constitutional amendment relating to the salaries of circuit court judges	Passed	91,994 (59.13%)	63,590 (40.87%)

=== 1906 ===
Proposal name	Description	Status	Yes votes	No votes
Proposal 1	A proposal calling for a constitutional convention	Passed	196,780 (60.74%)	127,189 (39.26%)

=== 1907 ===
Proposal name	Description	Status	Yes votes	No votes
Proposal 1	A constitutional amendment relating to the salaries of circuit court judges	Passed	94,585 (60.58%)	61,550 (39.42%)
Proposal 2	A constitutional amendment relating to boards of county auditors	Passed	98,259 (61.31%)	62,008 (38.69%)
Proposal 3	A constitutional amendment relating to teaching convicts certain trades	Passed	167,163 (66.34%)	84,831 (33.66%)

=== 1908 ===
Proposal name	Description	Status	Yes votes	No votes
Proposal 1	A constitutional amendment relating to corporate taxes	Passed	227,899 (62.37%)	137,500 (37.63%)
Proposal 2	A question as to whether to adopt the 1908 Constitution of Michigan	Passed	244,705 (65.17%)	130,783 (34.83%)

=== 1910 ===
Proposal name	Description	Status	Yes votes	No votes
Proposal 1	A constitutional amendment limiting the amount of debt counties can take on	Passed	137,147 (51.58%)	128,729 (48.42%)

=== 1911 ===
Proposal name	Description	Status	Yes votes	No votes
Proposal 1	A constitutional amendment relating to the apportionment of education funds to primary schools	Passed	246,167 (67.52%)	118,391 (32.48%)

=== 1912 ===
Proposal name	Description	Status	Yes votes	No votes
Proposal 1	A constitutional amendment relating to equal suffrage for women	Failed	247,375 (49.92%)	248,135 (50.08%)
Proposal 2	A constitutional amendment relating to the modification of city charters	Passed	285,373 (67.41%)	137,972 (32.59%)

=== 1913 ===
Proposal name	Description	Status	Yes votes	No votes
Proposal 1	A constitutional amendment relating to equal suffrage for women	Failed	168,738 (38.91%)	264,882 (61.09%)
Proposal 2	A constitutional amendment relating to citizen-led ballot measures for constitutional matters	Passed	204,796 (55.77%)	162,392 (44.23%)
Proposal 3	A constitutional amendment relating to citizen-led ballot measures for legislative matters	Passed	219,057 (58.97%)	152,388 (41.03%)
Proposal 4	A constitutional amendment relating to firefighter's benefits	Failed	179,948 (46.60%)	206,204 (53.40%)
Proposal 5	A constitutional amendment relating to the recall process for state officials	Passed	237,743 (62.05%)	145,412 (37.95%)

=== 1914 ===
Proposal name	Description	Status	Yes votes	No votes
Proposal 1	A constitutional amendment relating to state-issued bonds for the purpose of constructing and improving wagon roads	Failed	164,333 (44.85%)	202,087 (55.15%)
Proposal 2	A constitutional amendment relating to state-issued bonds for the purpose of constructing drains and developing agricultural lands	Failed	165,290 (45.26%)	199,873 (54.74%)
Proposal 3	A constitutional amendment relating to absentee voting	Passed	190,510 (51.99%)	175,948 (48.01%)
Proposal 4	A constitutional amendment relating to the regulation of fraternal beneficiary societies	Failed	92,392 (24.05%)	291,776 (75.95%)

=== 1915 ===
Proposal name	Description	Status	Yes votes	No votes
Proposal 1	A constitutional amendment allowing drainage districts to issue bonds	Failed	191,337 (49.07%)	198,553 (50.93%)

=== 1916 ===
Proposal name	Description	Status	Yes votes	No votes
Proposal 1	A constitutional amendment relating to alcohol prohibition	Passed	353,378 (55.38%)	284,754 (44.62%)
Proposal 2	A constitutional amendment relating to the local option	Failed	256,272 (40.35%)	378,871 (59.65%)
Proposal 3	A constitutional amendment relating to the right of repeal	Passed	283,823 (50.73%)	275,701 (49.27%)
Proposal 4	A constitutional amendment relating to the regulation of fraternal beneficiary societies	Failed	225,220 (39.17%)	349,810 (60.83%)

=== 1917 ===
Proposal name	Description	Status	Yes votes	No votes
Proposal 1	A constitutional amendment authorizing drainage districts to issue bonds	Passed	198,918 (58.86%)	139,027 (41.14%)
Proposal 2	A constitutional amendment relating to "the elective franchise"	Passed	216,270 (65.37%)	114,594 (34.63%)
Proposal 3	A constitutional amendment authorizing the state to acquire railroad properties	Passed	242,969 (70.69%)	100,722 (29.31%)
Proposal 4	A constitutional amendment relating to the salary of public officials	Failed	148,625 (43.49%)	193,119 (56.51%)
Proposal 5	A constitutional amendment relating to highway construction	Passed	209,559 (62.29%)	126,871 (37.71%)

=== 1918 ===
Proposal name	Description	Status	Yes votes	No votes
Proposal 1	A constitutional amendment requiring that all ballot measures be printed on the same ballot	Passed	317,070 (77.75%)	90,744 (22.25%)
Proposal 2	A constitutional amendment extending the right to vote to women	Passed	229,790 (54.06%)	195,284 (45.94%)

=== 1919 ===
Proposal name	Description	Status	Yes votes	No votes
Proposal 1	A constitutional amendment authorizing the state to issue bonds for the purpose of constructing highways	Passed	558,572 (71.26%)	225,239 (28.74%)
Proposal 2	A constitutional amendment relating to salary changes for state officials	Failed	313,539 (42.81%)	418,778 (57.19%)
Proposal 3	A constitutional amendment relating to the manufacturing of alcoholic beverages	Failed	322,603 (37.83%)	530,123 (62.17%)

=== 1920 ===
Proposal name	Description	Status	Yes votes	No votes
Proposal 1	A constitutional amendment relating to the salaries of some state officials	Failed	348,311 (42.88%)	463,959 (57.12%)
Proposal 2	A constitutional amendment relating to minimum qualifications for electors	Passed	415,780 (53.61%)	359,749 (46.39%)
Proposal 3	A constitutional amendment relating to compulsory school attendance	Failed	353,817 (36.68%)	610,699 (63.32%)
Proposal 4	A constitutional amendment relating to property condemnation	Failed	360,668 (45.08%)	439,373 (54.92%)
Proposal 5	A constitutional amendment relating to working hours for men	Passed	420,085 (50.40%)	413,362 (49.60%)

=== 1921 ===
Proposal name	Description	Status	Yes votes	No votes
Proposal 1	A constitutional amendment allowing the state to issue bonds as bonuses for soldiers of World War I	Passed	471,159 (71.74%)	185,602 (28.26%)

=== 1922 ===
Proposal name	Description	Status	Yes votes	No votes
Proposal 1	A constitutional amendment relating to a state income tax	Failed	180,176 (36.00%)	320,269 (64.00%)
Proposal 2	A constitutional amendment relating to ports and port districts	Failed	221,543 (49.06%)	230,060 (50.94%)
Proposal 3	A constitutional amendment relating to property condemnation	Failed	204,564 (42.54%)	276,304 (57.46%)

=== 1923 ===
Proposal name	Description	Status	Yes votes	No votes
Proposal 1	A constitutional amendment relating to ports and port districts	Passed	266,623 (56.18%)	207,926 (43.82%)

=== 1924 ===
Proposal name	Description	Status	Yes votes	No votes
Proposal 1	A constitutional amendment relating to compulsory school attendance	Failed	421,472 (35.66%)	760,571 (64.34%)
Proposal 2	A constitutional amendment relating to a state income tax	Failed	216,437 (19.15%)	913,833 (80.85%)
Proposal 3	A constitutional amendment relating to state legislative districts	Failed	231,718 (22.87%)	781,351 (77.13%)

=== 1926 ===
Proposal name	Description	Status	Yes votes	No votes
Proposal 1	A constitutional amendment relating to salaries for state legislators	Failed	189,739 (40.46%)	279,241 (59.54%)
Proposal 2	A constitutional amendment relating to term limits for sheriffs	Passed	278,329 (56.25%)	216,463 (43.75%)
Proposal 3	A constitutional amendment relating to the creation of metropolitan districts	Failed	207,993 (47.56%)	229,314 (52.44%)
Proposal 4	A constitutional amendment relating to property condemnation	Failed	204,859 (46.93%)	231,672 (53.07%)
Proposal 5	A constitutional amendment generally revising the constitution	Failed	119,491 (29.52%)	285,252 (70.48%)

=== 1927 ===
Proposal name	Description	Status	Yes votes	No votes
Proposal 1	A constitutional amendment relating to the creation of metropolitan districts	Passed	210,880 (51.26%)	200,490 (48.74%)

=== 1928 ===
Proposal name	Description	Status	Yes votes	No votes
Proposal 1	A constitutional amendment relating to salaries for state legislators	Passed	441,114 (51.38%)	417,419 (48.62%)
Proposal 2	A constitutional amendment relating to property condemnation	Passed	490,032 (54.27%)	412,928 (45.73%)
Proposal 3	A constitutional amendment modifying legislative districts	Passed	523,127 (57.50%)	386,673 (42.50%)

=== 1930 ===
Proposal name	Description	Status	Yes votes	No votes
Proposal 1	A constitutional amendment relating to township officers elections	Failed	275,781 (42.71%)	369,906 (57.29%)
Proposal 2	A constitutional amendment relating to river improvement projects	Failed	300,990 (45.62%)	358,734 (54.38%)
Proposal 3	A constitutional amendment increasing the homestead exemption	Failed	298,909 (45.58%)	356,938 (54.42%)
Proposal 4	A constitutional amendment relating to legislative districts	Failed	292,659 (41.59%)	411,043 (58.41%)
Proposal 5	A referendum to uphold a law taxing cigarettes	Failed	198,515 (30.50%)	452,375 (69.50%)

=== 1931 ===
Proposal name	Description	Status	Yes votes	No votes
Proposal 1	A referendum to uphold a law relating to capital punishment	Failed	269,538 (43.32%)	352,594 (56.68%)
Proposal 2	A constitutional amendment relating to landing fields improvements	Failed	263,508 (41.21%)	375,935 (58.79%)
Proposal 3	A constitutional amendment relating to state debt	Failed	262,394 (41.18%)	374,754 (58.82%)

=== 1932 ===
Proposal name	Description	Status	Yes votes	No votes
Proposal 1	A constitutional amendment establishing the Michigan Liquor Control Commission	Passed	1,022,508 (68.27%)	475,265 (31.73%)
Proposal 2	A constitutional amendment limiting property taxes	Passed	671,124 (51.11%)	641,962 (48.89%)
Proposal 3	A constitutional amendment relating to terms of office for state legislators	Failed	520,740 (43.89%)	665,766 (56.11%)
Proposal 4	A constitutional amendment relating to homestead tax exemptions	Failed	445,141 (36.84%)	763,311 (63.16%)
Proposal 5	A constitutional amendment changing residency requirements for electors	Passed	662,588 (58.15%)	476,849 (41.85%)
Proposal 6	A constitutional amendment relating to criminal pardons	Failed	590,260 (48.91%)	616,583 (51.09%)
Proposal 7	A constitutional amendment restricting the vote on bond issues to impacted property owners	Passed	642,142 (52.86%)	572,625 (47.14%)
Proposal 8	A referendum to uphold a law regulating the sale of oleomargarine	Failed	432,966 (36.47%)	754,372 (63.53%)

=== 1934 ===
Proposal name	Description	Status	Yes votes	No votes
Proposal 1	A constitutional amendment limiting some gasoline taxes	Failed	280,765 (25.63%)	814,616 (74.37%)
Proposal 2	A constitutional amendment abolishing uniform taxation	Failed	245,648 (23.53%)	798,193 (76.47%)
Proposal 3	A constitutional amendment limiting vehicle registration fees	Failed	292,760 (28.85%)	722,132 (71.15%)
Proposal 4	A constitutional amendment making the position of judge nonpartisan	Failed	501,580 (47.26%)	559,851 (52.74%)
Proposal 5	A constitutional amendment allowing counties to adopt home rule	Failed	399,135 (38.87%)	627,595 (61.13%)
Proposal 6	A constitutional amendment relating to justices of the peace	Failed	154,326 (15.96%)	812,856 (84.04%)
Proposal 7	A referendum upholding a law allowing the state to contract debt for the purpose of construction projects	Failed	51,378 (16.40%)	261,844 (83.60%)

=== 1935 ===
Proposal name	Description	Status	Yes votes	No votes
Proposal 1	A constitutional amendment relating to contested elections	Passed	485,859 (65.71%)	253,539 (34.29%)

=== 1936 ===
Proposal name	Description	Status	Yes votes	No votes
Proposal 1	A constitutional amendment relating to the use of firearms as evidence in criminal proceedings	Passed	815,221 (58.67%)	574,324 (41.33%)
Proposal 2	A constitutional amendment permitting counties to incorporate	Failed	583,057 (43.63%)	753,315 (56.37%)
Proposal 3	A constitutional amendment relating to exempting some types of food from sales tax	Failed	581,485 (38.10%)	944,573 (61.90%)
Proposal 4	A constitutional amendment creating a state income tax	Failed	382,262 (27.02%)	1,032,384 (72.98%)

=== 1938 ===
Proposal name	Description	Status	Yes votes	No votes
Proposal 1	A constitutional amendment increasing county office terms from two years to four years	Failed	414,832 (32.24%)	872,057 (67.76%)
Proposal 2	A constitutional amendment making Michigan Supreme Court justices be appointed and nonpartisan	Failed	504,904 (40.39%)	745,312 (59.61%)
Proposal 3	A constitutional amendment requiring that gas taxes be used only to fund highway and road improvements	Passed	813,289 (60.55%)	529,859 (39.45%)
Proposal 4	A referendum to uphold a social security law	Failed	497,569 (46.49%)	572,756 (53.51%)

=== 1939 ===
Proposal name	Description	Status	Yes votes	No votes
Proposal 1	A constitutional amendment making the position of judge a nonpartisan one	Passed	376,246 (60.93%)	241,252 (39.07%)
Proposal 2	A constitutional amendment granting circuit court commissioners additional powers	Failed	205,711 (36.89%)	351,961 (63.11%)

=== 1940 ===
Proposal name	Description	Status	Yes votes	No votes
Proposal 1	A constitutional amendment exempting school districts from some tax limitations	Failed	602,952 (41.69%)	843,159 (58.31%)
Proposal 2	A constitutional amendment establishing a system of civil service	Passed	766,764 (51.93%)	709,894 (48.07%)
Proposal 3	A referendum upholding a law which modified vehicle permitting requirements	Failed	640,051 (40.76%)	930,227 (59.24%)
Proposal 4	A referendum upholding a law further regulating the practice of dentistry and dental surgery	Passed	735,053 (58.73%)	516,597 (41.27%)

=== 1941 ===
Proposal name	Description	Status	Yes votes	No votes
Proposal 1	A constitutional amendment relating to the circulation of constitutional amendment petitions	Passed	386,859 (56.73%)	295,083 (43.27%)
Proposal 2	A constitutional amendment relating to the circulation of initiative and referendum petitions	Passed	372,796 (57.70%)	273,275 (42.30%)

=== 1942 ===
Proposal name	Description	Status	Yes votes	No votes
Proposal 1	A proposal calling for a constitutional convention	Failed	408,188 (46.56%)	468,506 (53.44%)
Proposal 2	A constitutional amendment allowing Wayne County to adopt a charter	Failed	432,164 (48.70%)	455,320 (51.30%)
Proposal 3	A referendum upholding a law creating a Milk Marketing Board	Failed	318,899 (35.27%)	585,380 (64.73%)

=== 1943 ===
Proposal name	Description	Status	Yes votes	No votes
Proposal 1	A constitutional amendment setting township officer terms at two years	Passed	215,957 (62.14%)	131,554 (37.86%)
Proposal 2	A constitutional amendment relating to homestead mortgages	Passed	169,736 (57.36%)	126,164 (42.64%)

=== 1944 ===
Proposal name	Description	Status	Yes votes	No votes
Proposal 1	A constitutional amendment modifying water furnishing limits	Passed	860,219 (60.23%)	568,090 (39.77%)
Proposal 2	A constitutional amendment modifying the eligibility of state legislators to run for other offices	Failed	676,142 (48.23%)	725,858 (51.77%)
Proposal 3	A constitutional amendment relating to the salaries of state legislators	Failed	614,300 (43.34%)	803,104 (56.66%)
Proposal 4	A constitutional amendment allowing Wayne County to adopt a charter	Failed	638,876 (42.85%)	851,926 (57.15%)

=== 1945 ===
Proposal name	Description	Status	Yes votes	No votes
Proposal 1	A constitutional amendment modifying taxation	Failed	115,463 (33.25%)	231,742 (66.75%)
Proposal 2	A constitutional amendment authorizing the state to control rivers and other waterways	Passed	189,313 (57.74%)	138,558 (42.26%)

=== 1946 ===
Proposal name	Description	Status	Yes votes	No votes
Proposal 1	A constitutional amendment limiting state control over some things	Passed	921,144 (68.36%)	426,430 (31.64%)
Proposal 2	A constitutional amendment returning a portion of sales tax revenues to some municipalities	Passed	864,530 (59.65%)	584,689 (40.35%)
Proposal 3	A constitutional amendment relating to payments for soldiers in World War II	Passed	871,296 (61.34%)	549,242 (38.66%)

=== 1948 ===
Proposal name	Description	Status	Yes votes	No votes
Proposal 1	A constitutional amendment relating to the order of succession	Passed	1,055,632 (68.07%)	495,214 (31.93%)
Proposal 2	A constitutional amendment relating to the distribution of state sales tax and annual school grants	Failed	343,217 (19.18%)	1,446,016 (80.82%)
Proposal 3	A constitutional amendment relating to the salaries of state officials	Passed	935,441 (63.75%)	531,950 (36.25%)
Proposal 4	A constitutional amendment relating to the salaries of state legislators	Passed	911,473 (60.80%)	587,691 (39.20%)
Proposal 5	A constitutional amendment modifying the property tax system	Passed	962,800 (56.79%)	732,677 (43.21%)
Proposal 6	A referendum upholding a law relating to foreign agencies	Passed	890,435 (60.33%)	585,469 (39.67%)
Proposal 7	A proposal relating to a general revision of the constitution	Failed (Note: The proposal needed a majority of all votes cast in the election to pass)	855,451 (51.70%)	799,198 (48.30%)

== 1950–1999 ==
=== 1950 ===
Proposal name	Description	Status	Yes votes	No votes
Proposal 1	A constitutional amendment relating to voting rights	Passed	907,312 (68.48%)	417,652 (31.52%)
Proposal 2	A constitutional amendment authorizing the state to issue some form of bond	Passed	1,224,249 (79.81%)	309,657 (20.19%)
Proposal 3	A constitutional amendment relating to the definition of subversion	Passed	823,938 (61.29%)	520,412 (38.71%)
Proposal 4	An initiative permitting the sale of oleomargarine	Passed	1,090,000 (65.98%)	562,034 (34.02%)

=== 1951 ===
Proposal name	Description	Status	Yes votes	No votes
Proposal 1	A constitutional amendment relating to meetings of the state legislature	Passed	405,570 (69.63%)	176,873 (30.37%)
Proposal 2	A constitutional amendment authorizing the payment of a death benefit bonus	Passed	401,117 (64.11%)	224,564 (35.89%)
Proposal 3	A constitutional amendment relating to the salaries of Supreme Court justices	Failed	276,632 (46.75%)	315,140 (53.25%)

=== 1952 ===
Proposal name	Description	Status	Yes votes	No votes
Proposal 1	A constitutional amendment relating to police authority over narcotic drugs investigations	Passed	1,910,728 (83.33%)	382,285 (16.67%)
Proposal 2	A constitutional amendment providing for reapportionment every ten years	Failed	924,242 (39.50%)	1,415,355 (60.50%)
Proposal 3	A constitutional amendment providing for reapportionment every ten years	Passed	1,269,807 (56.55%)	975,518 (43.45%)

=== 1954 ===
Proposal name	Description	Status	Yes votes	No votes
Proposal 1	A constitutional amendment relating to the elective franchise	Passed	1,202,811 (72.10%)	465,556 (27.90%)
Proposal 2	A constitutional amendment relating to sales taxes	Passed	1,182,412 (72.74%)	443,079 (27.26%)
Proposal 3	A constitutional amendment authorizing bonus payments for veterans of the Korean War	Passed	1,166,564 (68.26%)	542,541 (31.74%)
Proposal 4	A constitutional amendment permitting the Michigan State Legislature to authorize charitable lotteries	Failed	903,303 (48.89%)	944,388 (51.11%)

=== 1955 ===
Proposal name	Description	Status	Yes votes	No votes
Proposal 1	A constitutional amendment relating to nonpartisan judicial elections	Passed	559,279 (70.27%)	236,620 (29.73%)
Proposal 2	A constitutional amendment relating to minimum judge qualifications	Passed	596,145 (72.12%)	230,489 (27.88%)
Proposal 3	A constitutional amendment authorizing the state to borrow up to $100,000,000 (equivalent to $1,201,863,354 in 2025) for loans to school districts	Passed	455,868 (54.40%)	382,093 (45.60%)
Proposal 4	A constitutional amendment providing for a bipartisan board of state canvassers	Passed	456,986 (60.59%)	297,250 (39.41%)

=== 1956 ===
Proposal name	Description	Status	Yes votes	No votes
Proposal 1	A constitutional amendment relating to the minimum qualifications for state legislators	Passed	1,720,297 (86.16%)	276,229 (13.84%)

=== 1958 ===
Proposal name	Description	Status	Yes votes	No votes
Proposal 1	A proposal calling for a constitutional convention	Failed	821,282 (57.45%)	608,365 (42.55%)

=== 1959 ===
Proposal name	Description	Status	Yes votes	No votes
Proposal 1	A constitutional amendment establishing government continuity procedures	Passed	702,183 (74.76%)	237,071 (25.24%)
Proposal 2	A constitutional amendment changing the name of Michigan State University's governing body	Passed	595,333 (65.38%)	315,223 (34.62%)

=== 1960 ===
Proposal name	Description	Status	Yes votes	No votes
Proposal 1	A constitutional amendment relating to school bonds and state loans to school districts	Passed	1,416,188 (59.99%)	944,536 (40.01%)
Proposal 2	A constitutional amendment increasing the sales tax limitation	Passed	1,250,264 (50.41%)	1,230,001 (49.59%)
Proposal 3	A constitutional amendment changing the process for calling a constitutional convention	Passed	1,312,215 (57.76%)	959,527 (42.24%)

=== 1961 ===
Proposal name	Description	Status	Yes votes	No votes
Proposal 1	A proposal calling for a constitutional convention	Passed	596,433 (51.00%)	573,012 (49.00%)
Proposal 2	A constitutional amendment relating to state aid for industrial development	Failed	541,826 (48.80%)	568,476 (51.20%)

=== 1962 ===
Proposal name	Description	Status	Yes votes	No votes
Amendment 1	A constitutional amendment relating to the revision process for laws	Passed	890,005 (53.79%)	764,673 (46.21%)

=== 1963 ===
Proposal name	Description	Status	Yes votes	No votes
Amendment 1	A proposal to adopt the 1963 Michigan State Constitution	Passed	810,860 (50.23%)	803,436 (49.77%)

=== 1964 ===
Proposal name	Description	Status	Yes votes	No votes
Proposal C	A referendum to uphold a law preventing the use of straight ticket voting	Failed	795,546 (34.42%)	1,515,875 (65.58%)

=== 1966 ===
Proposal name	Description	Status	Yes votes	No votes
Proposal 1	A constitutional amendment lowering the voting age from 21 years to 18 years	Failed	703,076 (35.67%)	1,267,872 (64.33%)

=== 1968 ===
Proposal name	Description	Status	Yes votes	No votes
Proposal 1 (August)	A constitutional amendment establishing a judicial tenure commission and providing for its membership and duties	Passed	553,182 (70.75%)	228,738 (29.25%)
Proposal 2 (August)	A constitutional amendment providing for a state officer's compensation commission and providing for its membership, duties, and limitations	Passed	417,393 (54.62%)	346,839 (45.38%)
Proposal 3 (August)	A constitutional amendment providing that the Governor of Michigan fill judicial vacancies and extending existing constitutional provisions to appointed judges	Passed	494,512 (64.98%)	266,561 (35.02%)
Proposal 1 (November)	A constitutional amendment permitting the state to impose a graduated income tax	Failed	614,826 (23.29%)	2,025,052 (76.71%)
Proposal 2 (November)	A referendum upholding a law permitting the establishment of daylight saving time	Failed	1,402,562 (49.99%)	1,403,052 (50.01%)
Proposal 3 (November)	An initiative authorizing the state to issue bonds for the purpose of constructing water pollution prevention facilities	Passed	1,906,385 (70.54%)	796,079 (29.46%)
Proposal 4	An initiative authorizing the state to issue bonds for the purpose of constructing public recreational facilities	Passed	1,384,254 (52.84%)	1,235,681 (47.16%)
Proposal 5	A constitutional amendment permitting the election of members of the legislature to other state offices	Failed	778,388 (30.39%)	1,783,186 (69.61%)

=== 1970 ===
Proposal name	Description	Status	Yes votes	No votes
Proposal A	An initiative authorizing the state to issue bonds for urban redevelopment	Failed	921,482 (39.89%)	1,388,737 (60.11%)
Proposal B	A constitutional amendment lowering the voting age from 21 years to 18 years	Failed	924,981 (39.00%)	1,446,884 (61.00%)
Proposal C	A constitutional amendment prohibiting public aid to nonpublic schools and students	Passed	1,416,838 (56.77%)	1,078,740 (43.23%)

=== 1972 ===
Proposal name	Description	Status	Yes votes	No votes
Proposal A (May)	A constitutional amendment allowing the legislature to authorize lotteries and the sale of lottery tickets	Passed	1,352,768 (72.75%)	506,778 (27.25%)
Proposal B (May)	A constitutional amendment permitting members of the Michigan State Legislature to resign and accept another office to which they have been elected or appointed	Failed	866,593 (48.63%)	915,312 (51.37%)
Proposal A (August)	A constitutional amendment allowing trial by jury of less than 12 jurors in all prosecutions in all courts for misdemeanors punishable by imprisonment for not more than 1 year	Passed	696,570 (66.10%)	357,186 (33.90%)
Proposal A (November)	An initiative establishing daylight saving time in Michigan	Passed	1,754,887 (54.57%)	1,460,724 (45.43%)
Proposal B (November)	An initiative allowing physicians to perform abortions prior to 20 weeks	Failed	1,270,416 (39.35%)	1,958,265 (60.65%)
Proposal C	A constitutional amendment limiting property taxes for the purpose of funding schools and establishing a state fund for the support of schools	Failed	1,324,702 (42.19%)	1,815,126 (57.81%)
Proposal D	A constitutional amendment allowing the legislature to impose an income tax and allowing municipalities to impose income taxes	Failed	959,286 (31.33%)	2,102,744 (68.67%)
Proposal E	An initiative authorizing the state to issue bonds for the purpose of providing benefits to veterans	Failed	1,490,968 (48.19%)	1,603,203 (51.81%)

=== 1974 ===
Proposal name	Description	Status	Yes votes	No votes
Proposal A	A constitutional amendment limiting the use of the motor fuel tax fund	Failed	1,091,938 (48.79%)	1,146,109 (51.21%)
Proposal B	An initiative authorizing the state to issue bonds for the purpose of providing benefits to veterans	Passed	1,668,641 (70.45%)	700,041 (29.55%)
Proposal C	A constitutional amendment eliminating the sales and use tax on food and prescription drugs	Passed	1,337,609 (55.53%)	1,071,253 (44.47%)
Proposal D	An initiative authorizing the state to issue bonds for the purpose of funding transportation systems	Failed	963,576 (42.20%)	1,319,586 (57.80%)

=== 1976 ===
Proposal name	Description	Status	Yes votes	No votes
Proposal A	An initiative creating a bottle buyback program	Passed	2,160,398 (63.77%)	1,227,254 (36.23%)
Proposal B	A constitutional amendment lowering the age of eligibility for state legislators from 21 years to 18 years	Failed	698,993 (21.31%)	2,580,945 (78.69%)
Proposal C	A constitutional amendment placing a limit on a state income tax to 8.3%	Failed	1,407,438 (42.99%)	1,866,620 (57.01%)
Proposal D	A constitutional amendment removing the ban on a graduated income tax	Failed	897,780 (27.79%)	2,332,513 (72.21%)

=== 1978 ===
Proposal name	Description	Status	Yes votes	No votes
Proposal A	A proposal calling for a constitutional convention	Failed	640,286 (23.26%)	2,112,549 (76.74%)
Proposal B	An initiative to revise standards for parole	Passed	2,075,599 (74.48%)	711,262 (25.52%)
Proposal C	A constitutional amendment allowing the state to deposit funds in savings and loan associations, credit unions, and banks	Passed	1,819,847 (66.11%)	933,101 (33.89%)
Proposal D	A constitutional amendment raising the drinking age to 21 years	Passed	1,609,589 (57.12%)	1,208,497 (42.88%)
Proposal E	A constitutional amendment establishing limits on taxes imposed by the legislature and locla governments	Passed	1,450,150 (52.46%)	1,313,984 (47.54%)
Proposal G	A constitutional amendment allowing for Michigan State Police to engage in collective bargaining	Passed	1,535,023 (56.04%)	1,203,930 (43.96%)
Proposal H	A constitutional amendment prohibiting the use of property taxes for school operating expenses and establishing a voucher system	Failed	718,440 (25.71%)	2,075,583 (74.29%)
Proposal J	A constitutional amendment modifying the property and school tax system	Failed	1,032,343 (37.28%)	1,737,133 (62.72%)
Proposal K	A constitutional amendment allowing courts to deny bail for violent crimes and providing for the commencement of trials within 90 days	Passed	2,307,038 (83.43%)	458,357 (16.57%)
Proposal M	A constitutional amendment modifying the percentage of gas tax revenues used for road improvements	Passed	1,478,316 (54.52%)	1,233,196 (45.48%)
Proposal R	A constitutional amendment requiring the state to create a railroad redevelopment authority	Failed	1,257,606 (47.05%)	1,415,441 (52.95%)

=== 1980 ===
Proposal name	Description	Status	Yes votes	No votes
Proposal A	A constitutional amendment modifying the powers of local school boards	Failed	746,027 (21,22%)	2,769,497 (78.78%)
Proposal B	A constitutional amendment lowering the drinking age to 19 years	Failed	1,403,935 (38.41%)	2,250,873 (61.59%)
Proposal C	A constitutional amendment providing property tax relief	Failed	894,441 (25.72%)	2,583,253 (74.28%)
Proposal D	A constitutional amendment substantially modifying the property tax system	Failed	1,622,301 (44.16%)	2,051,008 (55.84%)
Proposal E	An initiative increasing the state income tax for the purpose of funding corrections programs	Failed	1,288,999 (36.92%)	2,202,042 (63.08%)
Proposal G	A constitutional amendment allowing the legislature to modify rules relating to legislative immunity	Failed	1,287,172 (37.62%)	2,134,546 (62.38%)
Proposal H	A constitutional amendment modifying the authority of the Lieutenant Governor of Michigan	Failed	1,410,912 (42.27%)	1,927,001 (57.73%)

=== 1981 ===
Proposal name	Description	Status	Yes votes	No votes
Proposal A	A constitutional amendment substantially modifying the tax system	Failed	560,924 (27.88%)	1,451,305 (72.12%)

=== 1982 ===
Proposal name	Description	Status	Yes votes	No votes
Proposal A	A constitutional amendment allowing the legislature to pass laws relating to legislative immunity	Passed	1,804,728 (63.67%)	1,029,743 (36.33%)
Proposal B	A constitutional amendment creating a Michigan Department of State Police	Failed	720,915 (25.45%)	2,111,802 (74.55%)
Proposal C	An initiative prohibiting lenders from using a "due on sale" clause in foreclosure proceedings	Failed	1,344,463 (48.18%)	1,445,897 (51.82%)
Proposal D	An initiative prohibiting utility rate increases unless a notice period and hearing has taken place	Passed	1,472,442 (50.70%)	1,431,884 (49.30%)
Proposal E	An initiative calling for a nuclear weapons freeze between the USSR and the USA	Passed	1,585,809 (56.60%)	1,216,172 (43.40%)
Proposal G	A constitutional amendment establishing an elected Public Service Commission	Failed	1,026,160 (36.68%)	1,771,098 (63.32%)
Proposal H	A constitutional amendment prohibiting some utility rate adjustments	Passed	1,670,381 (59.61%)	1,131,990 (40.39%)

=== 1984 ===
Proposal name	Description	Status	Yes votes	No votes
Proposal A	A constitutional amendment allowing the state legislature to overturn administrative rules	Failed	1,280,948 (41.21%)	1,827,677 (58.79%)
Proposal B	A constitutional amendment establishing a natural resources trust fund	Passed	2,066,554 (64.84%)	1,120,794 (35.16%)
Proposal C	A constitutional amendment modifying tax rates	Failed	1,376,141 (40.33%)	2,035,867 (59.67%)

=== 1986 ===
Proposal name	Description	Status	Yes votes	No votes
Proposal A	A constitutional amendment establishing a state library within the legislative branch	Failed	908,627 (49.24%)	936,643 (50.76%)
Proposal B	A constitutional amendment allowing the state legislature to overturn administrative rules	Failed	648,116 (36.31%)	1,136,721 (63.69%)
Proposal C	A constitutional amendment allowing the state officials compensation commission to set salaries for the Michigan Attorney General and Michigan Secretary of State	Failed	905,767 (49.88%)	910,297 (50.12%)

=== 1988 ===
Proposal name	Description	Status	Yes votes	No votes
Proposal A	A referendum upholding a law which prohibited the use of public funds for abortions if the recipient was on welfare	Passed	1,959,727 (56.87%)	1,486,371 (43.13%)
Proposal B	A constitutional amendment providing for victim's rights	Passed	2,662,796 (80.37%)	650,515 (19.63%)
Proposal C	An initiative authorizing the state to issue bonds for the purpose of funding environmental protection programs	Passed	2,528,109 (76.55%)	774,451 (23.45%)
Proposal D	An initiative authorizing the state to issue bonds for the purpose of funding public recreation projects	Passed	2,055,290 (63.01%)	1,206,465 (36.99%)

=== 1989 ===
Proposal name	Description	Status	Yes votes	No votes
Proposal A	A constitutional amendment increasing the sales tax and dedicating increased revenue to public schools	Failed	514,407 (27.72%)	1,341,292 (72.28%)
Proposal B	A constitutional amendment increasing the sales tax, dedicating increased revenue to public schools, and requiring voter renewal of property taxes	Failed	436,958 (23.89%)	1,392,053 (76.11%)

=== 1992 ===
Proposal name	Description	Status	Yes votes	No votes
Proposal A	A constitutional amendment limiting property tax increases	Failed	1,433,354 (37.54%)	2,384,777 (62.46%)
Proposal B	A constitutional amendment limiting the number of times a person can be elected to public office	Passed	2,295,904 (58.73%)	1,613,404 (41.27%)
Proposal C	A constitutional amendment relating to property taxes and school funding	Failed	1,552,119 (40.54%)	2,276,360 (59.46%)
Proposal D	An initiative to uphold changes to auto insurance laws	Failed	1,482,577 (37.41%)	2,480,032 (62.59%)

=== 1993 ===
Proposal name	Description	Status	Yes votes	No votes
Proposal A	A constitutional amendment increasing sales tax rates and decreasing the annual property tax increase	Failed	1,008,425 (46.41%)	1,164,468 (53.59%)

=== 1994 ===
Proposal name	Description	Status	Yes votes	No votes
Proposal A (March)	A constitutional amendment increasing sales tax rates and decreasing the annual property tax increase	Passed	1,684,541 (69.17%)	750,952 (30.83%)
Proposal A (November)	A measure calling for a constitutional convention	Failed	777,779 (27.92%)	2,008,070 (72.08%)
Proposal B	A constitutional amendment limiting criminal appeals	Passed	2,118,734 (73.55%)	761,784 (26.45%)
Proposal C	A referendum to uphold a law reducing auto insurance rates	Failed	1,165,732 (39.14%)	1,812,526 (60.86%)
Proposal P	A constitutional amendment establishing an endowment fund for Michigan state parks	Passed	2,007,097 (71.33%)	806,888 (28.67%)

=== 1996 ===
Proposal name	Description	Status	Yes votes	No votes
Proposal A	A referendum upholding some changes to the Michigan Bingo Act	Failed	1,511,063 (43.83%)	1,936,198 (56.17%)
Proposal B	A constitutional amendment requiring that all judges have practiced law at least five years before becoming judges	Passed	2,806,833 (81.68%)	629,402 (18.32%)
Proposal C	A constitutional amendment establishing a trust fund for veterans	Passed	2,447,905 (74.24%)	849,525 (25.76%)
Proposal D	An initiative limiting bear hunting season and the use of bait and dogs while hunting bear	Failed	1,379,340 (38.26%)	2,225,675 (61.74%)
Proposal E	An initiative permitting Detroit to host three casinos	Passed	1,878,542 (51.51%)	1,768,156 (48.49%)
Proposal G	An initiative granting the Natural Resources Commission full authority over wildlife management	Passed	2,413,730 (68.71%)	1,099,262 (31.29%)

=== 1998 ===
Proposal name	Description	Status	Yes votes	No votes
Proposal A	A constitutional amendment changing the word "handicapped" to "disabled" in the Michigan State Constitution	Passed	1,708,873 (59.13%)	1,181,138 (40.87%)
Proposal B	An initiative legalizing physician-assisted suicide	Failed	859,381 (28.88%)	2,116,154 (71.12%)
Proposal C	An initiative authorizing the state to issue bonds for the purpose of funding environmental and natural resources protection programs	Passed	1,821,006 (62.73%)	1,081,988 (37.27%)

== 2000– ==
=== 2000 ===
Proposal name	Description	Status	Yes votes	No votes
Proposal 00-1	A constitutional amendment allowing students to use tuition vouchers at private schools and requiring teacher tests	Failed	1,235,533 (30.87%)	2,767,320 (69.13%)
Proposal 00-2	A constitutional amendment requiring all laws impacting local governments receive a supermajority vote	Failed	1,242,516 (32.77%)	2,548,995 (67.23%)

=== 2002 ===
Proposal name	Description	Status	Yes votes	No votes
Proposal 02-1 (August)	A constitutional amendment modifying the pay structure for state officials	Passed	1,057,503 (72.32%)	404,682 (27.68%)
Proposal 02-2 (August)	A constitutional amendment allowing some state funds to be invested in parks and outdoor recreation	Passed	925,475 (62.05%)	565,971 (37.95%)
Proposal 02-1 (November)	A referendum to uphold legislation substantially modifying the election process	Failed	1,199,236 (40.32%)	1,775,043 (59.68%)
Proposal 02-2 (November)	An initiative authorizing the state to issue bonds for the purpose of funding sewage, stormwater, and water pollution projects	Passed	1,774,053 (60.21%)	1,172,612 (39.79%)
Proposal 02-3	A constitutional amendment affirming state employee's right to engage in collective bargaining	Failed	1,336,249 (45.64%)	1,591,756 (54.36%)
Proposal 02-4	A constitutional amendment reallocating money received from tobacco settlements	Failed	1,018,644 (33.62%)	2,011,105 (66.38%)

=== 2004 ===
Proposal name	Description	Status	Yes votes	No votes
Proposal 04-1	A constitutional amendment requiring voter approval for new gambling forms and facilities	Passed	2,689,448 (58.26%)	1,926,721 (41.74%)
Proposal 04-2	A constitutional amendment banning same-sex marriage	Passed	2,698,077 (58.62%)	1,904,319 (41.38%)

=== 2006 ===
Proposal name	Description	Status	Yes votes	No votes
Proposal 06-1	A constitutional amendment creating a Conservation and Recreation Legacy Fund	Passed	2,915,106 (81.07%)	680,859 (18.93%)
Proposal 06-2	A constitutional amendment banning affirmative action programs	Passed	2,141,010 (57.92%)	1,555,691 (42.08%)
Proposal 06-3	A referendum to uphold the legalization of mourning dove hunting	Failed	1,137,379 (30.97%)	2,534,680 (69.03%)
Proposal 06-4	A constitutional amendment restricting the use of eminent domain	Passed	2,914,214 (80.09%)	724,573 (19.91%)
Proposal 06-5	An initiative to set mandatory school funding levels	Failed	1,366,355 (37.69%)	2,259,247 (62.31%)

=== 2008 ===
Proposal name	Description	Status	Yes votes	No votes
Proposal 08-1	An initiative legalizing the use of medical marijuana	Passed	3,006,820 (62.67%)	1,790,889 (37.33%)
Proposal 08-2	A constitutional amendment allowing stem cell research to be conducted on embryos	Passed	2,521,026 (52.61%)	2,271,083 (47.39%)

=== 2010 ===
Proposal name	Description	Status	Yes votes	No votes
Proposal 10-1	A measure calling for a constitutional convention	Failed	983,019 (33.40%)	1,960,573 (66.60%)
Proposal 10-2	A constitutional amendment banning felons who were convicted of fraud from holding public office for 20 years	Passed	2,270,657 (74.91%)	760,586 (25.09%)

=== 2012 ===
Proposal name	Description	Status	Yes votes	No votes
Proposal 12-1	A referendum to uphold a law substantially modifying the emergency manager system	Failed	2,130,354 (47.33%)	2,370,601 (52.67%)
Proposal 12-2	A constitutional amendment to guarantee the right to collective bargaining	Failed	1,949,513 (42.60%)	2,626,731 (57.40%)
Proposal 12-3	A constitutional amendment to mandate at least 25% of state electricity come from renewable resources	Failed	1,721,279 (37.72%)	2,842,000 (62.28%)
Proposal 12-4	A constitutional amendment overhauling the home healthcare system	Failed	1,985,595 (43.77%)	2,550,420 (56.23%)
Proposal 12-5	A constitutional amendment requiring that tax increases be passed by either a supermajority vote in the state legislature or by a statewide vote	Failed	1,410,944 (31.24%)	3,105,649 (68.76%)
Proposal 12-6	A constitutional amendment requiring voters to approve any new bridge or tunnel to Canada	Failed	1,853,127 (40.70%)	2,699,558 (59.30%)

=== 2014 ===
Proposal name	Description	Status	Yes votes	No votes
Proposal 14-1 (August)	An initiative to exempt commercial and industrial property from the personal property tax	Passed	863,459 (69.29%)	382,770 (30.71%)
Proposal 14-1 (November)	A referendum to uphold the legalization of wolf hunting	Failed	1,318,080 (45.07%)	1,606,328 (54.93%)
Proposal 14-2	A referendum to uphold a law allowing the Michigan Natural Resources Commission to classify game animals and hunting seasons	Failed	1,051,426 (36.16%)	1,856,603 (63.84%)

=== 2015 ===
Proposal name	Description	Status	Yes votes	No votes
Proposal 15-1	A joint constitutional amendment and statue change to substantially modify the tax system as it relates to transportation	Failed	349,862 (19.93%)	1,406,019 (80.07%)

=== 2018 ===
Proposal name	Description	Status	Yes votes	No votes
Proposal 18-1	An initiative to legalize marijuana possession, production, and sale	Passed	2,356,422 (55.89%)	1,859,675 (44.11%)
Proposal 18-2	A constitutional amendment to create an independent redistricting commission	Passed	2,522,355 (61.28%)	1,593,556 (38.72%)
Proposal 18-3	A constitutional amendment making substantial changes to state voting procedures	Passed	2,777,998 (66.91%)	1,373,636 (33.09%)

=== 2020 ===
Proposal name	Description	Status	Yes votes	No votes
Proposal 20-1	A constitutional amendment making changes to the way park-related revenue can be spent	Passed	4,154,745 (84.29%)	774,509 (15.71%)
Proposal 20-2	A constitutional amendment requiring the police to obtain a search warrant before accessing a person's electronic data	Passed	4,472,671 (88.75%)	567,130 (11.25%)

=== 2022 ===
Proposal name	Description	Status	Yes votes	No votes
Proposal 22-1	A constitutional amendment changing state legislator's term limits to a flat 12 years, regardless of position.	Passed	2,838,540 (66.45%)	1,433,154 (33.55%)
Proposal 22-2	A constitutional amendment implementing significant changes to the voting system, including requiring photo identification, an early-voting period, and the creation of an absentee ballot system.	Passed	2,586,269 (59.99%)	1,725,130 (40.01%)
Proposal 22-3	A constitutional amendment establishing a right to reproductive freedom in Michigan.	Passed	2,482,497 (56.66%)	1,898,914 (43.34%)

=== 2026 ===
Proposal name	Description	Status	Yes votes	No votes
Michigan Constitutional Convention Question	Hold a state Constitutional Convention.	On ballot		
Proposal 26-2	An initiative to prohibit regulated electric and gas utilities, contractors with over $250,000 annually in government contracts, and people and organizations with substantial connections to those utilities or contractors, from making direct or indirect contributions to those who run for offices that regulate them, and also provide further regulations for campaign finance laws and spending on political communications.	On ballot		

== See also ==
- Government of Michigan
