= 2020 Michigan elections =

- November 3, 2020

This is a list of elections in the US state of Michigan in 2020. The office of the Michigan Secretary of State oversees the election process, including voting and vote counting.

To vote by mail, registered Michigan voters must request a ballot by October 30, 2020. As of early October some 2,760,076 voters had requested mail ballots.

== Federal ==
=== President of the United States ===
The nominees for the presidential election were Donald Trump, Joe Biden, and Jo Jorgensen.

=== United States Senate ===
Gary Peters (incumbent, D) ran against John James (R), in addition to Marcia Squier (G), Doug Dern (Natural Law Party), and Valerie Willis (U.S. Taxpayers Party of Michigan).

=== United States House of Representatives ===
Michigan voters elected 14 candidates for the U.S. House of Representatives in the general election, one from each of the 14 congressional districts.

U.S. House of Representatives nominees by district
District	Democratic nominee	Republican nominee	Libertarian nominee	Green nominee	U.S. Taxpayers nominee	Working Class nominee
District 1	Dana Alan Ferguson	Jack Bergman, incumbent	Ben Boren			
District 2	Bryan Berghoef	Bill Huizenga, incumbent	Max Riekse	Jean-Michel Creviere	Gerald T. Van Sickle	
District 3	Hillary Scholten	Peter Meijer				
District 4	Jerry Hilliard	John Moolenaar, incumbent	David Canny	Amy Slepr		
District 5	Dan Kildee, incumbent	Tim Kelly	James Harris			Kathy Goodwin
District 6	Jon Hoadley	Fred Upton, incumbent	Jeff DePoy	John Lawrence		
District 7	Gretchen Driskell	Tim Walberg, incumbent				
District 8	Elissa Slotkin, incumbent	Paul Junge	Joe Hartman			
District 9	Andy Levin, incumbent	Charles Langworthy	Mike Saliba			Andrea Kirby
District 10	Kimberly Bizon	Lisa McClain				
District 11	Haley Stevens, incumbent	Eric Esshaki	Leonard Schwartz			
District 12	Debbie Dingell, incumbent	Jeff Jones				Gary Walkowicz
District 13	Rashida Tlaib, incumbent	David Dudenhoefer		D. Etta Wilcoxin	Articia Bomer	Sam Johnson
District 14	Brenda Lawrence, incumbent	Robert Vance Patrick	Lisa Lane Gioia	Clyde Shabazz		Philip Kolody

== Legislature ==
=== House of Representatives ===
110 seats in Michigan's House were up for election in the general election. The Michigan Republican Party retained control of the chamber.

== Judiciary ==
=== Supreme Court ===
2020 Michigan Supreme Court election
- November 3, 2020

2 seats of the Supreme Court of Michigan
	Majority party	Minority party
Party	Republican	Democratic
Last election	4	3
Seats won	0	2
Seats after	3	4
Seat change	▼1	▲1

Two of seven seats on the Michigan Supreme Court were up for election, and one was open after an incumbent retired. Supreme Court Justice Bridget McCormack ran for reelection. Each voter could select up to two candidates in the state Supreme Court general election; the top two vote-getters would win the seats.

==== Candidates ====
- Susan Hubbard (Green), judge of the Third Judicial Circuit Court of Michigan
- Mary Kelly (Republican), St. Clair County prosecutor
- Bridget Mary McCormack (Democratic), incumbent chief justice of the Michigan Supreme Court
- Kerry Lee Morgan (Libertarian), private practice attorney
- Katie Nepton (Libertarian), attorney
- Brock Swartzle (Republican), judge of the Michigan Court of Appeals for the 4th District
- Elizabeth Welch (Democratic), employment lawyer

==== Polling ====
Poll source	Date(s) administered	Sample size (Note: Key: A – all adults RV – registered voters LV – likely voters V – unclear)	Margin of error	Susan Hubbard (G)	Mary Kelly (R)	Bridget Mary McCormack (D)	Kerry Lee Morgan (L)	Katherine Mary Nepton (L)	Brock Swartzle (R)	Elizabeth Welch (D)	Undecided
Public Policy Polling (D) (Note: Poll conducted for Progress Michigan, a non-profit that primarily supports Democratic candidates.)	October 29–30, 2020	745 (V)	± 3.6%	3%	18%	39%	3%	6%	14%	29%	89%
Public Policy Polling (D)	September 30 – October 1, 2020	746 (V)	–	6%	9%	23%	6%	5%	8%	17%	126%
Public Policy Polling (D)	August 28–29, 2020	897 (V)	± 3.2%	5%	8%	10%	3%	5%	4%	5%	160%

Hypothetical polling

Poll source	Date(s) administered	Sample size	Margin of error	Generic Democrat	Generic Republican	Generic Third Party	Undecided
Public Policy Polling/Progress Michigan	October 29–30, 2020	745 (V)	± 3.6%	47%	41%	3%	10% (Note: "Party affiliation would not make a difference" with 10%)
Public Policy Polling/Progress Michigan	September 30 – October 1, 2020	746 (V)	–	40%	38%	4%	19% (Note: "Party affiliation would not make a difference" with 19%)
Public Policy Polling/Progress Michigan	August 28–29, 2020	897 (V)	–	41%	37%	4%	18% (Note: "Party affiliation would not make a difference" with 18%)
Public Policy Polling/Progress Michigan	June 26–27, 2020	1,237 (V)	–	38%	37%	–	25% (Note: "It wouldn't make a difference which party was backing a candidate" with 20%; "Not sure" with 5%)

==== Results ====
2020 Michigan Supreme Court (two seats) election
Party	Candidate	Votes	%
Nonpartisan	Bridget Mary McCormack (incumbent)	2,377,410	32.25%
Nonpartisan	Elizabeth M. Welch	1,490,550	20.22%
Nonpartisan	Mary Kelly	1,252,692	16.99%
Nonpartisan	Brock Swartzle	1,009,320	13.69%
Nonpartisan	Susan Hubbard	611,019	8.29%
Nonpartisan	Kerry Lee Morgan	340,396	4.62%
Nonpartisan	Katherine Nepton	290,377	3.94%
Total votes		7,371,764	100.0%
Democratic hold			
Democratic gain from Republican			

== Michigan State Board of Education and University boards ==
=== State executive offices ===
Eight state executive offices were open for election in Michigan's general election, including State Board of Education (two seats), University of Michigan Board of Regents (two seats), Michigan State University Board of Trustees (two seats), and Wayne State University Board of Governors (two seats).

== Ballot initiatives ==
There were two statewide legislatively referred constitutional amendments on the ballot for the general election:

- Proposal 1, Use of State and Local Park Funds Amendment: Revises formula for how state and local park funds from trusts can be spent
- Proposal 2, Search Warrant for Electronic Data Amendment: Requires search warrant to access a person's electronic data

== Notes ==
Partisan clients

== See also ==
- Elections in Michigan
- 2020 United States elections
