= 102nd Michigan Legislature =

Legislature in Michigan, USA (began 2023)

| ← | 101st | 103rd | → |
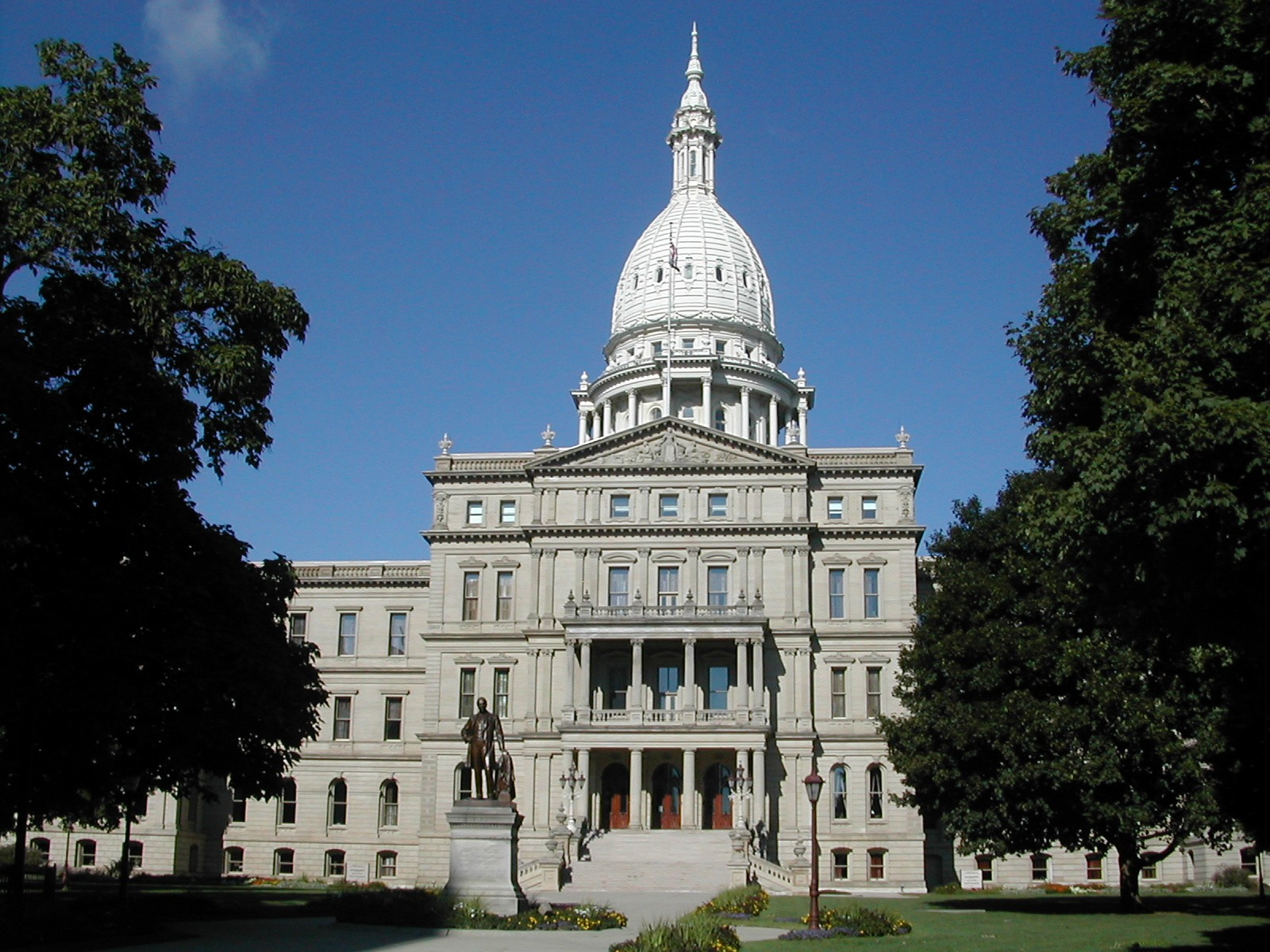

Overview
- Term: January 1, 2023 – December 31, 2024

Michigan Senate
- President of the Senate: Lt. Gov. Garlin Gilchrist (D)
- Senate Majority Leader: Winnie Brinks (D)
- Senate Minority Leader: Aric Nesbitt (R)
- Party control: Democratic

Michigan House of Representatives
- Members: 110
- Speaker of the House: Joe Tate (D)
- House Majority Leader: Abraham Aiyash (D)
- House Minority Leader: Matt Hall (R)
- Party control: Democratic

Sessions
- 1st: January 1, 2023 – November 14, 2023
- 2nd: January 1, 2024 – December 19, 2024

The 102nd Michigan Legislature, consisting of the Michigan Senate and the Michigan House of Representatives, began its first session on January 1, 2023, which ended on November 14, 2023. A second session began on January 1, 2024, being adjourned on December 19 of that year.

Members in both the House of Representatives and Senate were elected in the 2022 election. It is the first time that Democrats have held both houses of the legislature and the governorship since the 82nd Michigan Legislature in 1983–1984, the first time that Democrats have held the majority in the House since 2008, and the first time Democrats have held the majority in the Senate since 1984. It is also the first legislature whose districts were drawn by the Michigan Independent Citizens Redistricting Commission, which was created through the passage of 2018 Michigan Proposal 2, based on the results of the 2020 United States census and the resulting redistricting cycle.

== Membership ==
=== Leadership ===
- House
  - Speaker: State Rep. Joe Tate
    - Speaker pro tempore: State Rep. Laurie Pohutsky
    - Associate Speaker Pro Tem.: state Rep. Carol Glanville
    - Associate Speaker Pro Tem.: state Rep. Kristian Grant
    - Majority Floor Leader: State Rep. Abraham Aiyash
      - Assistant Majority Floor Leaders: state Reps. Kara Hope, Jimmie Wilson Jr. and Betsy Coffia
    - Majority Whip: state Rep. Ranjeev Puri
      - Deputy Whips: state Reps. Carrie Rheingans and Alabas Farhat
    - Majority Caucus Chair: state Rep. Amos O’Neal
      - Majority Caucus Vice Chairs: state Reps. Helena Scott, Brenda Carter and Jasper Martus
  - Minority Leader: State Rep. Matt Hall
    - assistant assistant leader: Rep. Andrew Beeler
    - minority floor leader: Rep. Bryan Posthumus
    - minority Whip: Rep. Sarah Lightner
    - minority Caucus chair: Rep. Ken Borton
    - minority caucus’ vice chair: Rep. Jamie Greene
  - Clerk: TBD
  - Sergeant-at-arms: TBD
- Senate
  - Senate President: Lt. Gov. Garlin Gilchrist
    - Senate president pro tempore: State Sen. Jeremy Moss
    - Majority Leader: State Sen. Winnie Brinks
      - Assistant Majority Leader: State Sen. Darrin Camilleri
    - Majority Floor Leader: Rep. Sam Singh
    - Majority Caucus Chair: State Sen. Dayna Polehanki
    - Majority Policy and Steering Chair: State Sen. Stephanie Chang
    - Majority Whip: State Sen Mallory McMorrow
  - Minority Leader: State Sen. Aric Nesbitt
    - minority floor leader: Sen. Dan Lauwers
    - minority caucus whip: Sen. Roger Victory
    - minority caucus chair: Sen. Kevin Daley
    - assistant minority leader: Sen. Rick Outman
    - assistant minority floor leader: Sen. Lana Theis
  - Clerk: TBD
  - Sergeant-at-arms: TBD

Joe Tate became the first African American speaker of the House, and Winnie Brinks became the first woman majority leader of the Senate. Jeremy Moss became the first LGBT person to serve as Senate president pro tempore.

=== Composition changes ===
As a result of Democratic state representatives Lori Stone (HD13) and Kevin Coleman (HD25) being elected as mayors of Warren and Westland, the House Democratic majority was lessened to a tie with Republicans. Special elections for both districts were scheduled for April 25, 2024 (with a primary scheduled for January 30), with Democratic leadership remaining in control of the House in the interim.

== Legislation ==
Prior to and during the first session, members of the Democratic majority, as well as Governor Gretchen Whitmer, announced their intent to pursue many of the following:

- repeal of Right-to-work law (signed into law March 24, 2023)
- expansion of the Elliott-Larsen Civil Rights Act to include sexual orientation, gender identity, hair style and texture, and more (LGBT protections signed on March 16, 2023, CROWN Act signed June 15, 2023)
- Repeal of Act 328, which de jure bans abortion, homosexuality, adultery and other behaviors (abortion ban repeal signed April 5, 2023)
- add abortion status to the Elliot Larsen Act to protect against employment retaliation
- stricter regulations on firearms such as universal background checks and a ban on 3D printed guns
- red flag law (signed May 23, 2023)
- repeal of the state's retirement tax
- raising the state's earned income tax credit from 6% to 30%
- universal pre-K
- investment in renewable energy such as wind and solar power
- requirement for utilities to deliver 100% renewable energy by 2040
- allowance for state regulators to override local government decisions on locations of large-scale solar and wind arrays
- increasing education spending
- further investment in manufacturing
- increase funding for affordable housing and neighborhood revitalization (bill signed January 30, 2023)
- Automatic restoration of voting rights and registration to former prisoners upon release (bill signed November 30, 2023)
- criminalize poll worker intimidation (bill signed November 30, 2023)
- regulate political ads which use AI-generated content (bill signed November 30, 2023)
- tighten the election certification process (bill signed November 30, 2023)
- repeal a ban on paid transportation to polling locations (bill signed October 24, 2023)

== See also ==
- List of Michigan state legislatures
