= Elections in Michigan =

Elections in Michigan are held to fill various local, state and federal seats. Special elections may be held to fill vacancies at other points in time.

In a 2020 study, Michigan was ranked as the 13th easiest state for citizens to vote in.

== General elections ==
=== 1980s-2000s ===
- 1984 presidential election
- 1988 presidential election
- 1992 presidential election
- 1996 presidential election
- 2000 presidential election
- 2002 gubernatorial election
- 2002 U.S. Senate election
- 2004 presidential election
- 2006 gubernatorial election
- 2006 U.S. Senate election
- 2008 State House elections
- 2008 U.S. House elections
- 2008 U.S. Senate election
- 2008 presidential election

=== 2010s ===
- 2010 U.S. House elections
- 2010 gubernatorial election
- 2012 U.S. House elections
- 2012 U.S. Senate election
- 2012 presidential election
- 2014 Michigan elections
- 2014 gubernatorial election
- 2014 U.S. House elections
- 2014 U.S. Senate election
- 2016 U.S. House elections
- 2016 presidential election
- 2018 Michigan elections

=== 2020s ===
- 2020 Michigan elections
- 2022 Michigan elections
- 2024 Michigan elections
- 2026 Michigan elections

== Presidential primaries ==
- 2004 Democratic Caucuses
- 2008 Democratic Primary
- 2008 Republican Primary
- 2012 Democratic Primary
- 2012 Republican Primary
- 2016 Democratic Primary

== Ballot measures ==
- List of Michigan ballot measures
- 1996 Proposal E
- 2004 Proposal 2
- 2006 Proposal 2
- 2012 ballot proposals

Michigan approved plans to expand Medicaid coverage in 2014 to adults with incomes up to 133% of the federal poverty level (approximately $15,500 for a single adult in 2014).

In 2018, the state electorate passed proposals to create an independent redistricting commission, and to legalize the recreational use of marijuana.

In 2020, voters approved two ballot measures, one to increase the limit of money from sales of gas and oil from state-owned land that can benefit state parks, and another to require a warrant for search or seizure of electronic data and communications.

== See also ==
- 2026 Michigan elections
- Political party strength in Michigan
- United States presidential elections in Michigan
- List of Michigan state legislatures
- List of special elections to the Michigan House of Representatives
- List of special elections to the Michigan Senate

== Images ==
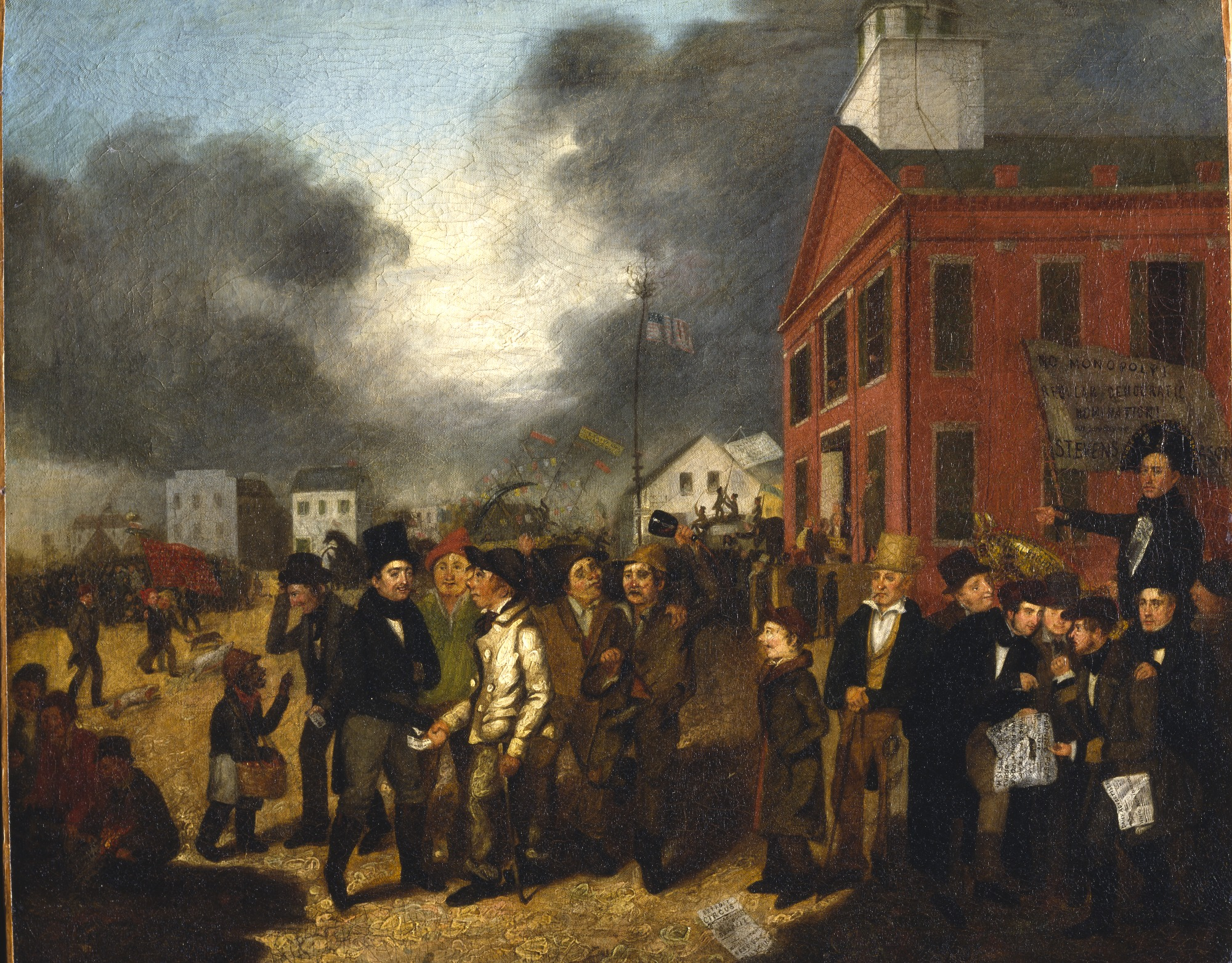
"First State Election in Detroit," painting by Thomas Mickell Burnham depicting the 1837 Michigan gubernatorial election
