= List of politics by U.S. state or territory =

The following is a list of politics by U.S. state and U.S. territory. The District of Columbia is also included.

| State, federal district, or territory | Politics |
|---|---|
| Alabama | Politics of Alabama |
| Alaska | Politics of Alaska |
| American Samoa | Politics of American Samoa |
| Arizona | Politics of Arizona |
| Arkansas | Politics of Arkansas |
| California | Politics of California |
| Colorado | Politics of Colorado |
| Connecticut | Politics of Connecticut |
| Delaware | Politics of Delaware |
| District of Columbia | Politics of the District of Columbia |
| Florida | Politics of Florida |
| (Georgia (U.S. state)) Georgia | Politics of Georgia |
| Guam | Politics of Guam |
| Hawaii | Politics of Hawaii |
| Idaho | Politics of Idaho |
| Illinois | Politics of Illinois |
| Indiana | Politics of Indiana |
| Iowa | Politics of Iowa |
| Kansas | Politics of Kansas |
| Kentucky | Politics of Kentucky |
| Louisiana | Politics of Louisiana |
| Maine | Politics of Maine |
| Maryland | Politics of Maryland |
| Massachusetts | Politics of Massachusetts |
| Michigan | Politics of Michigan |
| Minnesota | Politics of Minnesota |
| Mississippi | Politics of Mississippi |
| Missouri | Politics of Missouri |
| Montana | Politics of Montana |
| Nebraska | Politics of Nebraska |
| Nevada | Politics of Nevada |
| New Hampshire | Politics of New Hampshire |
| New Jersey | Politics of New Jersey |
| New Mexico | Politics of New Mexico |
| (New York (state)) New York | Politics of New York |
| North Carolina | Politics of North Carolina |
| North Dakota | Politics of North Dakota |
| Northern Mariana Islands | Politics of the Northern Mariana Islands |
| Ohio | Politics of Ohio |
| Oklahoma | Politics of Oklahoma |
| Oregon | Politics of Oregon |
| Pennsylvania | Politics of Pennsylvania |
| Puerto Rico | Politics of Puerto Rico |
| Rhode Island | Politics of Rhode Island |
| South Carolina | Politics of South Carolina |
| South Dakota | Politics of South Dakota |
| Tennessee | Politics of Tennessee |
| Texas | Politics of Texas |
| Utah | Politics of Utah |
| Vermont | Politics of Vermont |
| (United States Virgin Islands) Virgin Islands (U.S.) | Politics of the U.S. Virgin Islands |
| Virginia | Politics of Virginia |
| (Washington (state)) Washington | Politics of Washington |
| West Virginia | Politics of West Virginia |
| Wisconsin | Politics of Wisconsin |
| Wyoming | Politics of Wyoming |
