= 2020 Michigan Proposal 1 =

Proposal 1
- November 3, 2020
- Amend Use Of Park Revenue

Results
Choice	Votes	%
Yes	4,138,940	84.28%
No	771,808	15.72%
Total votes	4,910,748	100.00%

Yes
90–100%
80–90%
70–80%
60–70%
No
90–100%
70–80%
Other
No votes

Michigan Proposal 20-1 was a ballot initiative approved by voters in Michigan as part of the 2020 United States elections. The ballot initiative amended the Michigan Constitution to require money generated from drilling of oil and gas on state-owned land to be used for upkeep of Michigan's parks and acquisition of land for recreational purposes such as hunting and fishing.

== Ballot access ==
The proposal was unanimously approved by the Michigan House of Representatives and Michigan Senate to be presented to voters.

== Contents ==
The proposal appeared on the ballot as follows:

A proposed constitutional amendment to allow money from oil and gas mining on state-owned lands to continue to be collected and state funds for land protection and creation and maintenance of parks, nature areas, and public recreation facilities; and to describe how money in those state funds can be spent

This proposed constitutional amendment would:

- Allow the State Parks Endowment Fund to continue receiving money from sales of oil and gas from state-owned lands to improve, maintain and purchase land for State parks and for Fund administration, until its balance reaches $800,000,000.
- Require subsequent oil and gas revenue from state-owned lands to go into the Natural Resources Trust Fund.
- Require at least 20% of Endowment Fund annual spending go toward State park improvement.
- Require at least 25% of Trust Fund annual spending go toward parks and public recreation areas and at least 25% toward land conservation.

== Support ==
The proposal was supported by many environmental organizations, as well as DTE Energy and the Democratic Party of Michigan. Becca Maher, the campaign manager for the initiative, wrote "this will create the flexibility needed to fund trails and parks while continuing to prioritize land conservation and protection" and "this ballot measure will not increase taxes."

== Opposition ==
The proposal was opposed by the Green Party of Michigan, writing that "[the proposal] would tie the state's operating budget to continued oil and gas drilling -- including fracking".

The proposal was also opposed by the Sierra Club's Michigan chapter, writing that while "Sierra Club recognizes and agrees with the need for greater investments in maintenance of recreational facilities within Michigan’s state owned public lands [...] shifting prioritization of money from the MNRTF away from purchasing land and to the maintenance of facilities is shortsighted" and "We can’t continue to rely on oil and gas royalties as a funding source, when we urgently need to end our reliance on them to combat climate change and protect our environment. We need to find new, sustainable, long-term funding sources for the funds. ... Land is non-renewable. If we miss out on the acquisition of a spectacular parcel and it gets sold and subdivided, that’s that—we missed it."

== Results ==
Proposal 1
Choice	Votes	%
For	4,138,940	84.28
Against	771,808	15.72
Total	4,910,748	100.00

The proposal was approved in a landslide, with around 84% of the vote.

== See also ==
- List of Michigan ballot measures
