= 2022 Michigan Proposal 2 =

Proposal 2
- November 8, 2022
- Right to Voting Policies Amendment

Results
Choice	Votes	%
Yes	2,586,255	59.99%
No	1,725,110	40.01%
Total votes	4,311,365	100.00%
County results
Yes
70–80%
60–70%
50–60%
No
60–70%
50–60%

2022 Michigan Proposal 2 (also referred to as Proposal 22-2), the Right to Voting Policies Amendment (also known as Promote the Vote), was a citizen-initiated proposed constitutional amendment in the state of Michigan, which was voted on as part of the 2022 Michigan elections. The amendment changed voting procedures in the state with the goal of making it easier to vote.

== Background ==
Various voting rights advocacy groups gathered 669,972 signatures, enough for the amendment to be placed on the 2022 ballot. On August 31, the Board of State Canvassers, responsible for determining whether candidates and initiatives should be placed on the ballot, deadlocked 2-2, with challengers arguing that the ballot title of the initiative was misleading. On September 9, the Michigan Supreme Court ruled that the initiative should be placed on the November ballot.

== Contents ==
The proposal appeared on the ballot as follows:

A proposal to amend the state constitution to add provisions regarding elections

This proposed constitutional amendment would:

- Recognize fundamental right to vote without harassing conduct;
- Require military or overseas ballots be counted if postmarked by election day;
- Provide voter right to verify identity with photo ID or signed statement;
- Provide voter right to single application to vote absentee in all elections;
- Require state-funded absentee-ballot drop boxes, and postage for absentee applications and ballots;
- Provide that only election officials may conduct post-election audits;
- Require nine days of early in-person voting;
- Allow donations to fund elections, which must be disclosed;
- Require canvass boards certify election results based only on the official records of votes cast.

Should this proposal be adopted?

== Results ==
Proposal 2 was approved with 59.99% of the vote.

Proposal 2
Choice	Votes	%
For	2,586,255	59.99
Against	1,725,110	40.01
Total	4,311,365	100.00

== Recount ==
The America Project, a Donald Trump aligned organization, funded a partial recount of this proposal as well as 2022 Michigan Proposal 3 despite their passage by wide margins. The recount was spearheaded by Jerome Jay Allen of the conservative group Election Integrity Fund and Force. The recount lasted two weeks and added 14 yes votes and 20 no votes to the totals. This led to calls to tighten recount rules to disallow or make more expensive for those request them, frivolous recounts with no chance of changing the vote outcome. On July 9, 2024, governor Gretchen Whitmer signed a bill that would restrict recounts to cases where there was a reasonable chance the election outcome could be flipped.

== See also ==
- List of Michigan ballot measures
