= 2022 Michigan Proposal 1 =

Proposal 1
- November 8, 2022
- Legislative Term Limits and Financial Disclosure Amendment

Results
Choice	Votes	%
Yes	2,838,540	66.45%
No	1,433,154	33.55%
Total votes	4,271,694	100.00%
County results
Yes
70–80%
60–70%
50–60%
No
50–60%

2022 Michigan Proposal 1 (also referred to as Proposal 22-1), the Legislative Term Limits and Financial Disclosure Amendment is a legislatively-referred proposed constitutional amendment in the state of Michigan, which was voted on as part of the 2022 Michigan elections. The amendment modifies term limits in the Michigan state legislature and increase financial disclosure requirements for various elected officials. The amendment passed by a wide margin.

== Background ==
An effort to get a similar proposal on the ballot was initially backed by a bipartisan group which included politicians such as Democratic Detroit mayor Mike Duggan and Republican former Speaker of the Michigan House of Representatives Jase Bolger. On May 10, 2022, the Michigan Legislature voted to place a modified version of that proposal on the ballot, which allowed the group to forgo the signature gathering required for citizen-initiated constitutional amendments in the state.

== Contents ==
The proposal appeared on the ballot as follows:

A proposal to amend the state constitution to require annual public financial disclosure reports by legislators and other state officers and change state legislator term limit to 12 total years in legislature

This proposed constitutional amendment would:

- Require members of legislature, governor, lieutenant governor, secretary of state, and attorney general file annual public financial disclosure reports after 2023, including assets, liabilities, income sources, future employment agreements, gifts, travel reimbursements, and positions held in organizations except religious, social, and political organizations.
- Require legislature implement but not limit or restrict reporting requirements.
- Replace current term limits for state representatives and state senators with a 12-year total limit in any combination between house and senate, except a person elected to senate in 2022 may be elected the number of times allowed when that person became a candidate.

Should this proposal be adopted?

== Results ==
Proposal 1 was approved with 66.45% of the vote.

Proposal 1
Choice	Votes	%
For	2,838,540	66.45
Against	1,433,154	33.55
Total	4,271,694	100.00

Legislation enacting the financial disclosure provisions of the approved ballot proposal were signed into law on December 8, 2023.

== See also ==
- List of Michigan ballot measures
