= 1958 Michigan Constitutional Convention Question =

Constitutional Convention Question
- November 4, 1958
- Question on the Calling of a Constitutional Convention

Results
Choice	Votes	%
Yes	821,282	57.45%
No	608,365	42.55%
Total votes	1,429,647	100.00%

The 1958 Michigan Constitutional Convention Question was rejected on November 4. If approved, a state constitutional convention would have been held to draft a constitution to replace the 1908 constitution.

The referendum was rejected despite "yes" votes being the majority. This is because such constitutional convention questions were required to have "yes" votes be the majority of total votes in the 1958 election as a whole.

== Ballot language ==
The following was the language of the proposal on the ballot, as reported by The Grand Rapids Press:

Shall a convention be held to consider revision or amendment of the Michigan constitution for subsequent submission to the electors of this state for their approval?

== History ==
In 1958, the 1908 Michigan Constitution was the latest state constitution adopted. The constitutional convention was held from 1907 to 1908. It came into effect on January 1, 1909.

The 1908 constitution required that every 16 years, starting in 1926, that there be a referendum on whether or not to hold a constitutional convention. These automatic ballot referrals failed in 1926 and 1942, with a majority of voters voting "no". In 1948, the state legislature initiated a referendum on calling a constitutional convention. While the 1948 proposal had more "yes" than "no" votes, it failed because the 1908 constitution required a majority of voters in the entire election vote "yes" in order to trigger a constitutional convention. The year 1958 was the next year, following 1942, in which the 1908 constitution mandated a constitutional convention referendum.

The 1908 constitution mandated that every county in Michigan would be represented by three delegates from each state Senate district. The constitution did not specify a selection method for said delegates. In early January, Republican State Sen. J. Edward Hutchinson introduced a bill proposing a delegate selection method, to be used if the public voted to call a constitutional convention. The bill called for the delegates to be elected by a partisan primary in February, followed by an April general election.

The Democrats opposed Hutchinson's bill and a potential constitutional convention, on the basis of the apportionment of the delegates. They feared basing the apportionment of delegates on state Senate districts would favor Republicans. State Senate districts then were based on area, while state House districts were based on population. The state Senate also had long held a Republican majority. The Democrats were attempting to amend the state constitution to base delegate apportionment off of state House districts.

The Hutchinson plan passed through the state Senate elections committee on January 25. It was voted on by the state Senate on January 29. Democratic State Sen. John Swainson proposed an amendment to the Hutchinson bill, getting rid of specific references to delegate apportionment by state Senate districts. Swainson's amendment would have made the bill applicable regardless of the apportionment method dictated by the constitution. The amendment was defeated by 10–20 vote. Hutchinson's bill passed, without the amendment, by a vote of 22–8. Only two Democrats voted in favor the bill, Philip Rahoi and William E. Miron. Both represented the sparsely populated Upper Peninsula.

The state House held a 61–49 Republican majority in 1958. The Hutchinson bill passed through the chamber on March 27, with a vote of 61–41.

On April 16, Democratic Governor G. Mennen Williams vetoed the Hutchinson bill. He stated that selection method for delegates could be decided after the referendum was held.

The League of Women Voters of Michigan supported the establishment of constitutional convention, regardless of delegate selection method. President of the organization, Mrs. Berrien C. Ketchum explained that they wanted to make the constitution more concise by removing the "statuary material". The group also wanted a new constitution to make more clear the role of local government. On August 27 in Lansing, the State Citizen's Committee for Con-Con was founded, which campaigned for a "yes" vote on the proposal. Those supporting the committee included League of Women Voters, the Michigan Education Association, Junior Chamber of Commerce, and the Michigan Association of University Women.

The AFL-CIO joined the Democratic Party in opposing a potential constitutional convention. CIO President August Scholle did not like the 1908 constitution, but feared the apportionment system for delegates would too heavily favor rural areas. The Michigan Farm Bureau did not support the proposal either, on the basis that the convention would be too expensive and that the amendment process was sufficient to fix any constitutional issues.

The referendum was held on November 4, alongside the 1958 general election. The proposal was rejected, with 821,282 "yes" votes, and 608,365 "no" votes. Like in 1948, while a majority who voted on the proposal voted "yes", it needed a majority of total votes in the general election to vote "yes". The total number of votes on the referendum was 1,429,647, and the total number of voters in the 1958 general election was 2,341,829.

In November 1960, voters approved a ballot proposal which made it easier for constitutional convention referendums to be called by only requiring that "yes" votes be greater than "no" votes. The same proposal called for an election regarding the establishment of a constitutional convention be held in April 1961. In April 1961, Michigan voted in favor of calling a constitutional convention. The resultant convention was held from 1961 to 1962. In April 1963, Michigan voted to adopt the resultant constitution. The current 1963 Michigan Constitution came into effect on January 1, 1964.
