= 1972 Michigan Proposal B =

Referendum on abortion

Proposal B
- Abortion Legalization to 20 Weeks Initiative

Results
Choice	Votes	%
Yes	1,270,416	39.35%
No	1,958,265	60.65%
Total votes	3,228,681	100.00%
County results
No
70–80%
60–70%
50–60%
Yes
50–60%
- Source: Right to Life of Michigan

Michigan Proposal B, the Abortion Legalization to 20 Weeks Initiative, was on the ballot in Michigan as an indirect initiated state statute on November 7, 1972. The ballot measure was defeated with 60.65% of the vote. However, the U.S. Supreme Court would overturn Michigan's abortion ban in the Roe v. Wade ruling one year later.

== Contents ==
The ballot title for Proposal B was as follows:

PROPOSAL TO ALLOW ABORTION UNDER CERTAIN CONDITIONS. The proposed law would allow a licensed medical or osteopathic physician to perform an abortion at the request of the patient if, (1) the period of gestation has not exceeded 20 weeks, and (2) if the procedure is performed in a licensed hospital or other facility approved by the Department of Public Health. Should this proposed law be approved?

== Support ==
The Michigan Abortion Referendum Committee led the campaign in support of the ballot measure. The Michigan Coordinating Committee for Abortion Law Reform (MCCARL) formed the committee to lead the petition drive and campaign. The ballot initiative was also supported by Michigan Governor William Milliken (R).

== Opposition ==
The Voice of the Unborn Coalition led the campaign in opposition to the ballot measure. People Taking Action Against Abortion (PTAAA) and Grand Rapids Right to Life formed the coalition to lead the campaign. Detroit mayor Roman Gribbs (D) also opposed the measure, stating that "We’ve lost sight of the consequences. We’re dealing with human meanings. We’re dealing with life."

== Results by county ==
Here are the results of Proposal B by county. Red represents counties won by No. Blue represents counties won by Yes.

County	No		Yes	
County	Percentage	Votes	Percentage	Votes
Alcona	69.7%	2,522	30.3%	1,096
Alger	70.5%	2,621	29.5%	1,094
Allegan	72.6%	18,560	27.4%	6,995
Alpena	76%	8,626	24%	2,717
Antrim	63.3%	3,805	36.7%	2,210
Arenac	69.3%	3,048	30.7%	1,348
Baraga	77.9%	2,619	22.1%	741
Barry	61.3%	9,530	38.7%	6,008
Bay	75.6%	33,042	24.4%	10,656
Benzie	56.3%	2,234	43.7%	1,732
Berrien	58%	32,109	42%	23,236
Branch	60.6%	7,818	39.4%	5,065
Calhoun	55%	28,225	45%	23,126
Cass	51.8%	7,247	48.2%	6,752
Charlevoix	64.3%	4,783	35.7%	2,657
Cheboygan	72.7%	5,223	27.3%	1,964
Chippewa	68.3%	7,696	31.7%	3,579
Clare	65.4%	4,330	34.6%	2,286
Clinton	73%	13,941	27%	5,176
Crawford	63%	1,856	37%	1,087
Delta	75.8%	11,169	24.2%	3,573
Dickinson	76.5%	8,422	23.5%	2,584
Eaton	63.3%	17,905	36.7%	10,362
Emmet	61.3%	4,839	38.7%	3,050
Genesee	59%	91,522	41%	63,651
Gladwin	67.3%	3,610	32.7%	1,758
Gogebic	74.2%	7,472	25.8%	2,593
Grand Traverse	57.8%	9,667	42.2%	7,054
Gratiot	64.6%	9,086	35.4%	4,979
Hillsdale	61.7%	8,005	38.3%	4,972
Houghton	71%	10,363	29%	4,230
Huron	76.7%	10,502	23.3%	3,184
Ingham	51%	59,228	49%	56,830
Ionia	72%	12,016	28%	4,666
Iosco	64%	5,576	36%	3,133
Iron	73%	5,230	27%	1,944
Isabella	60.6%	10,375	39.4%	6,733
Jackson	61.1%	31,741	38.9%	20,178
Kalamazoo	52.9%	43,314	47.1%	38,608
Kalkaska	68.4%	1,919	31.6%	885
Kent	68.9%	116,795	31.1%	52,726
Keweenaw	75.3%	864	24.7%	284
Lake	66.2%	1,985	33.8%	1,012
Lapeer	65.6%	11,277	34.4%	5,918
Leelanau	66.6%	3,702	33.3%	1,855
Lenawee	58.5%	16,331	41.5%	11,608
Livingston	58.8%	14,207	41.2%	9,949
Luce	60.4%	1,345	39.6%	882
Mackinac	71.2%	3,495	28.8%	1,413
Macomb	64%	140,741	36%	79,217
Manistee				
Marquette	63.7%	14,937	36.3%	8,498
Mason	67%	7,017	33%	3,448
Mecosta	63.6%	6,633	36.4%	3,796
Menominee	76.6%	7,922	23.4%	2,422
Midland	57.1%	14,867	42.9%	11,152
Missaukee	79.9%	2,917	20.1%	735
Monroe	69.9%	27,309	30.1%	11,765
Montcalm	66.2%	9,420	33.8%	4,800
Montmorency	70.1%	1,846	29.9%	786
Muskegon	68.2%	38,256	31.8%	17,830
Newaygo	71.6%	8,746	28.4%	3,468
Oakland	48.7%	175,148	51.3%	184,248
Oceana	71.2%	5,359	28.8%	2,170
Ogemaw	68.5%	3,708	31.5%	1,705
Ontonagon	71.9%	3,558	28.1%	1,389
Osceola	72.9%	4,375	27.1%	1,629
Oscoda	69.3%	1,475	30.7%	654
Otsego	69%	3,205	31%	1,442
Ottawa	78.4%	44,257	21.6%	12,189
Presque Isle	78.9%	4,780	21.1%	1,278
Roscommon	63.6%	3,898	36.4%	2,234
Saginaw	66.4%	47,637	33.6%	24,125
St. Clair	67.8%	15,393	32.2%	7,304
St. Joseph	61.6%	10,311	38.4%	6,437
Sanilac	74.3%	11,127	25.7%	3,854
Schoolcraft	69.9%	2,767	30.1%	1,285
Shiawassee	72.4%	17,372	27.6%	6,621
Tuscola	70.8%	11,960	29.2%	4,934
Van Buren	62.4%	12,190	37.6%	7,344
Washtenaw	41.3%	41,993	58.7%	59,587
Wayne	59.7%	513,972	40.3%	346,566
Wexford	67%	5,636	33%	2,780
