= 2020 Michigan Proposal 2 =

Proposal 2
- Search Warrant for Electronic Data Amendment

Results
Choice	Votes	%
Yes	4,472,671	88.75%
No	567,130	11.25%
Total votes	5,039,801	100.00%

Yes
90–100%
80–90%
70–80%
60–70%
No
60–70%
Other
No data

Michigan Proposal 20-2 was a ballot initiative approved by voters in Michigan as part of the 2020 United States elections.

== Contents ==
The proposal appeared on the ballot as follows:

A proposed constitutional amendment to require a search warrant to access a person’s electronic data or electronic communications

This proposed constitutional amendment would:

- Prohibit unreasonable searches or seizures of a person’s electronic data and electronic communications.
- Require a search warrant to access a person’s electronic data or electronic communications, under the same conditions currently required for the government to obtain a search warrant to search a person’s house or seize a person’s things.

== Results ==
Proposal 2
Choice	Votes	%
For	4,472,671	88.75
Against	567,130	11.25
Total	5,039,801	100.00

The proposal was approved in a landslide, with around 88% of the vote.

== See also ==
- List of Michigan ballot proposals
