= Politics of Michigan =

United States presidential election results for Michigan
Year	Republican / Whig		Democratic		Third party(ies)	
Year	No.	%	No.	%	No.	%
1836	5,545	43.78%	7,122	56.22%	0	0.00%
1840	22,933	51.71%	21,096	47.57%	321	0.72%
1844	24,375	43.72%	27,737	49.75%	3,639	6.53%
1848	23,947	36.80%	30,742	47.24%	10,393	15.97%
1852	33,860	40.83%	41,842	50.45%	7,237	8.73%
1856	71,762	57.15%	52,139	41.52%	1,660	1.32%
1860	88,450	57.23%	64,889	41.99%	1,210	0.78%
1864	79,149	53.60%	68,513	46.40%	0	0.00%
1868	128,560	56.98%	97,060	43.02%	0	0.00%
1872	138,758	62.66%	78,551	35.47%	4,146	1.87%
1876	166,901	52.41%	141,685	44.49%	9,864	3.10%
1880	185,335	52.49%	131,597	37.27%	36,147	10.24%
1884	192,669	48.02%	189,361	47.20%	19,156	4.77%
1888	236,387	49.73%	213,469	44.91%	25,500	5.36%
1892	222,708	47.79%	201,624	43.26%	41,713	8.95%
1896	293,336	53.77%	237,166	43.47%	15,083	2.76%
1900	316,269	58.10%	211,685	38.89%	16,425	3.02%
1904	364,957	69.51%	135,392	25.79%	24,678	4.70%
1908	335,580	61.93%	175,771	32.44%	30,479	5.63%
1912	152,244	27.63%	150,751	27.36%	247,981	45.01%
1916	339,097	52.09%	286,775	44.05%	25,101	3.86%
1920	762,865	72.76%	233,450	22.27%	52,096	4.97%
1924	874,631	75.37%	152,359	13.13%	133,429	11.50%
1928	965,396	70.36%	396,762	28.92%	9,924	0.72%
1932	739,894	44.44%	871,700	52.36%	53,171	3.19%
1936	699,733	38.76%	1,016,794	56.33%	88,571	4.91%
1940	1,039,917	49.85%	1,032,991	49.52%	13,021	0.62%
1944	1,084,423	49.18%	1,106,899	50.19%	13,901	0.63%
1948	1,038,595	49.23%	1,003,448	47.57%	67,566	3.20%
1952	1,551,529	55.44%	1,230,657	43.97%	16,406	0.59%
1956	1,713,647	55.63%	1,359,898	44.15%	6,923	0.22%
1960	1,620,428	48.84%	1,687,269	50.85%	10,400	0.31%
1964	1,060,152	33.10%	2,136,615	66.70%	6,335	0.20%
1968	1,370,665	41.46%	1,593,082	48.18%	342,503	10.36%
1972	1,961,721	56.20%	1,459,435	41.81%	69,169	1.98%
1976	1,893,742	51.83%	1,696,714	46.44%	63,293	1.73%
1980	1,915,225	48.99%	1,661,532	42.50%	332,968	8.52%
1984	2,251,571	59.23%	1,529,638	40.24%	20,449	0.54%
1988	1,965,486	53.57%	1,675,783	45.67%	27,889	0.76%
1992	1,554,940	36.38%	1,871,182	43.77%	848,551	19.85%
1996	1,481,212	38.48%	1,989,653	51.69%	377,979	9.82%
2000	1,953,139	46.14%	2,170,418	51.28%	109,154	2.58%
2004	2,313,746	47.81%	2,479,183	51.23%	46,323	0.96%
2008	2,048,639	40.89%	2,872,579	57.33%	89,388	1.78%
2012	2,115,256	44.58%	2,564,569	54.04%	65,491	1.38%
2016	2,279,543	47.25%	2,268,839	47.03%	276,160	5.72%
2020	2,649,864	47.77%	2,804,045	50.55%	93,277	1.68%
2024	2,816,636	49.73%	2,736,533	48.31%	111,017	1.96%

The politics of Michigan, a swing state in presidential elections, are closely contested. Until 2016, Michigan was considered part of the Democrats' "Blue Wall." Governors since the 1970s have alternated between the two parties, and statewide offices including attorney general, secretary of state, and senator have been held by members of both parties in varying proportions, though the state currently is represented by two Democratic U.S. Senators and Democrats hold every statewide office. The Michigan Legislature is currently split between the two parties, with Democrats holding a 20–18 majority in the Senate and the Republicans holding a 58–52 majority in the House of Representatives. The state's congressional delegation is commonly split, with one party or the other typically holding a narrow majority: Republicans currently have a 7–6 majority, in the ongoing 119th Congress.

The state has historically been a bellwether, having voted for the national winner all but six times since 1920, with the exceptions of 1940, 1948, 1968, 1976, 2000, and 2004. It currently has the longest active bellwether streak, tied with Wisconsin and Pennsylvania, going back to the 2008 election. Prior to being a swing state, it was a Republican stronghold, voting Republican all but once from the founding of the GOP in 1854 until 1928, with the lone exception being a Progressive victory in 1912.

Republican strongholds of the state include the rural areas in Western and Northern Michigan, the Upper Peninsula, Livingston County, and (historically) the outer suburbs of Grand Rapids although redistricting after the 2020 census and shifting demographics has led many political observers to call the Grand Rapids suburbs a "toss-up" in future elections. Areas of Democratic strength include the cities of Detroit, Ann Arbor, Lansing, Flint, Kalamazoo, Grand Rapids, and Muskegon, as well as many of those cities' inner-ring suburbs. Much of suburban Detroit—which includes parts of Oakland, Macomb, and Wayne counties—is politically competitive between the two parties.

== History ==
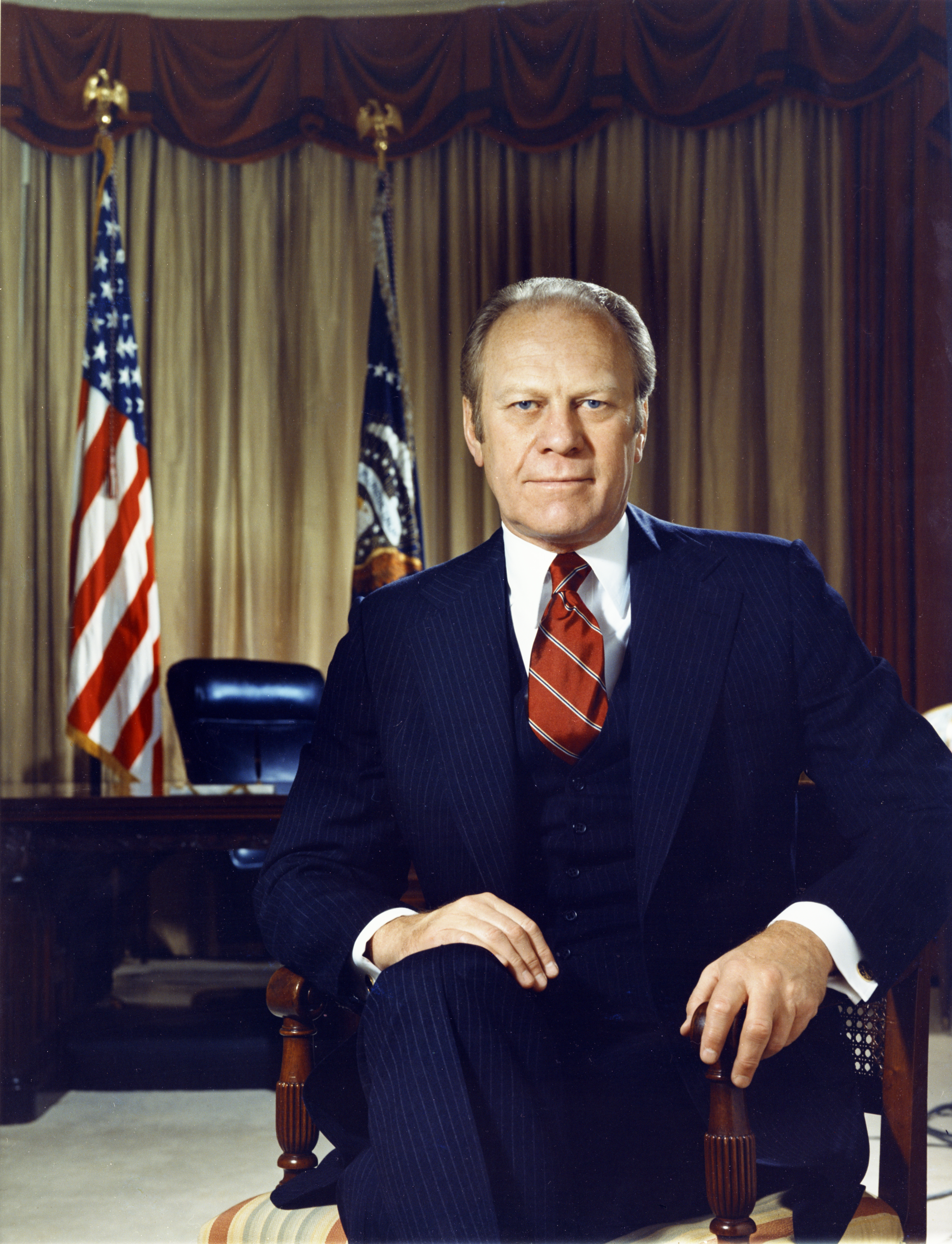
Michigan's only U.S. president, Gerald R. Ford

Historically, the first county-level meeting of the Republican Party took place in Jackson on July 6, 1854, and the party thereafter dominated Michigan until the Great Depression. In the 1912 election, Michigan was one of the six states to support progressive Republican and third-party candidate Theodore Roosevelt for president after he lost the Republican nomination to William Howard Taft.

Michigan remained fairly reliably Republican at the presidential level for much of the 20th century. It was part of Greater New England, the northern tier of states settled chiefly by migrants from New England who carried their culture with them. The state was one of only a handful to back Wendell Willkie over Franklin Roosevelt in 1940, and supported Thomas E. Dewey in his losing bid against Harry S. Truman in 1948.

Michigan went to the Democrats in all three presidential elections during the 1960s but voted for the Republican candidate in every election from 1972 to 1988, including "native son" Gerald Ford in 1976. From 1992 to 2012, it supported the Democrats by small to moderate margins. Beginning in 2016, it has become a closely contested swing state, voting for Donald Trump in 2016, flipping to Joe Biden in 2020, and flipping back to Trump in 2024, with each of those elections decided by less than a 3% margin and the latter two making Michigan the closest state to the national results, making it a bellwether as well.

Michigan was the home of Gerald Ford, the 38th president of the United States. Born in Nebraska, he moved as an infant to Grand Rapids. The Gerald R. Ford Museum is in Grand Rapids, and the Gerald R. Ford Presidential Library is on the campus of his alma mater, the University of Michigan in Ann Arbor.

Michigan's United States Senator Thomas W. Ferry, was President pro tempore of the United States Senate from March 9, 1875 – March 17, 1879. Vice President Henry Wilson died on November 22, 1875. Ferry, being President pro tempore of the Senate, was next in the line of presidential succession, and remained so until March 4, 1877. While the title "Acting Vice President" isn't defined in the Constitution, the title was widely used at the time (including by Ferry himself).

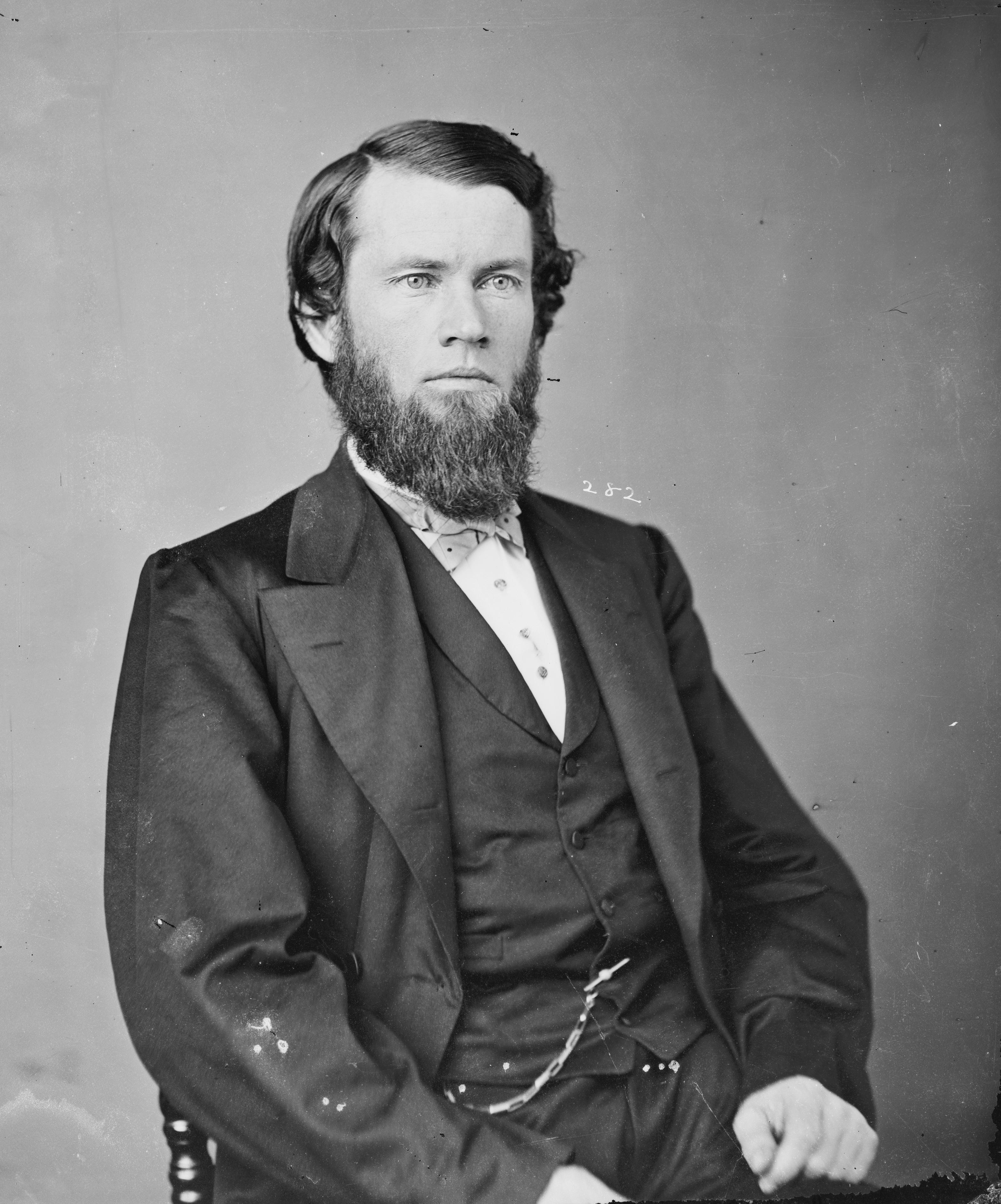
Senator Thomas Ferry who served as president pro tempore and acting president of the U.S. Senate during the 1870s.

In 1846, Michigan became the first state in the Union, as well as the first government in the world, to abolish the death penalty. Historian David Chardavoyne has suggested the movement to abolish capital punishment in Michigan grew out of enmity toward Canada, which made public executions a regular practice under British rule.

=== 2020 election ===
U.S. Senate results, 2020. While Republicans dominated the Upper Peninsula and the rural counties of the Lower Peninsula, Democrats carried the state by winning the Detroit metropolitan area.

While Michigan remained competitive in 2020, Democratic nominee Joe Biden's strength with traditional Democratic constituencies such as Black voters (93% to Trump's 6%) and organized labor (56% to Trump's 42%) and increased voter turnout in Detroit and its wealthy suburbs helped tip the state in his favor.

== Ballot initiatives ==
Michigan approved plans to expand Medicaid coverage in 2014 to adults with incomes up to 133% of the federal poverty level (approximately $15,500 for a single adult in 2014).

In 2018, the state electorate passed proposals to create an independent redistricting commission, and to legalize the recreational use of marijuana.

In 2020, voters approved two ballot measures, one to increase the limit of money from sales of gas and oil from state-owned land that can benefit state parks, and another to require a warrant for search or seizure of electronic data and communications.

In 2022, voters considered three ballot proposals. Proposal 22-1 would require annual public financial disclosure reports from legislators and other state officials. It would also limit state legislators to a total term of 12 years, in any combination between the house and senate. Proposal 22-2 would add provisions to the constitution about conducting elections, including measures to recognize the right to vote without harassment and to require nine days of early voting and state-funded absentee-ballot drop boxes, among others. Proposal 22-3 would establish a new individual right to reproductive freedom, including the right to make all decisions about pregnancy and abortion. It also would forbid prosecution of any individual exercising that right. All three ballot proposals passed with significant support.

== Federal representation ==
Following each decennial census, the Michigan Redistricting Commission forms to redraw the districts. Michigan currently has 13 House districts. In the 119th Congress, seven of Michigan's seats are held by Republicans and six are held by Democrats:

- Michigan's 1st congressional district represented by Jack Bergman (R)
- Michigan's 2nd congressional district represented by John Moolenaar (R)
- Michigan's 3rd congressional district represented by Hillary Scholten (D)
- Michigan's 4th congressional district represented by Bill Huizenga (R)
- Michigan's 5th congressional district represented by Tim Walberg (R)
- Michigan's 6th congressional district represented by Debbie Dingell (D)
- Michigan's 7th congressional district represented by Tom Barrett (R)
- Michigan's 8th congressional district represented by Kristen McDonald Rivet (D)
- Michigan's 9th congressional district represented by Lisa McClain (R)
- Michigan's 10th congressional district represented by John James (R)
- Michigan's 11th congressional district represented by Haley Stevens (D)
- Michigan's 12th congressional district represented by Rashida Tlaib (D)
- Michigan's 13th congressional district represented by Shri Thanedar (D)

Michigan's two United States senators are Democrats Elissa Slotkin and Gary Peters, serving since 2025 and 2015, respectively.

Michigan is part of the United States District Court for the Western District of Michigan and the United States District Court for the Eastern District of Michigan in the federal judiciary. The district's cases are appealed to the Cincinnati-based United States Court of Appeals for the Sixth Circuit.

== See also ==
- List of Michigan state legislatures
