= 2014 Michigan elections =

- November 4, 2014

The 2014 Michigan elections were held in the U.S. state of Michigan on November 4, 2014. Primary elections were held on August 5, 2014.

Voters elected all four executive officers and both houses of the state legislature, as well as the state's delegations to the U.S. House and one of its two U.S. Senate seats.

As of 2026, this remains the most recent time that the Republican Party has won any statewide executive office in Michigan.

== Federal elections ==
=== U.S. Senate ===
Incumbent Democratic Senator Carl Levin was re-elected in 2008 with 62.7% of the vote. He retired instead of seeking a seventh term. U.S. Representative Gary Peters defeated former secretary of state Terri Lynn Land in the general election.

2014 United States Senate election in Michigan
Party	Candidate	Votes	%	±%
Democratic	Gary Peters	1,704,936	54.61	▼8.05
Republican	Terri Lynn Land	1,290,199	41.33	▲7.48
Libertarian	Jim Fulner	62,897	2.01	▲0.44
Constitution	Richard Matkin	37,529	1.20	▲0.56
Green	Chris Wahmhoff	26,137	0.84	▼0.06
Write-in		77	0.00	
Total votes		3,121,775	100.00	
Democratic hold				

=== U.S. House ===
District	Democratic		Republican		Others		Total		Result
District	Votes	%	Votes	%	Votes	%	Votes	%	Result
District 1	113,263	45.28%	130,414	52.14%	6,454	2.58%	250,131	100.00%	Republican Hold
District 2	70,851	33.25%	135,568	63.63%	6,653	3.12%	213,072	100.00%	Republican Hold
District 3	84,720	39.01%	125,754	57.91%	6,691	3.08%	217,165	100.00%	Republican Hold
District 4	85,777	39.09%	123,962	56.50%	9,684	4.41%	219,423	100.00%	Republican Hold
District 5	148,182	66.71%	69,222	31.16%	4,734	2.13%	222,138	100.00%	Democratic Hold
District 6	84,391	40.38%	116,801	55.89%	7,784	3.73%	208,976	100.00%	Republican Hold
District 7	92,083	41.17%	119,564	53.45%	12,038	5.38%	223,685	100.00%	Republican Hold
District 8	102,269	42.06%	132,739	54.60%	8,117	3.34%	243,125	100.00%	Republican Hold
District 9	136,342	60.39%	81,470	36.09%	7,945	3.52%	225,757	100.00%	Democratic Hold
District 10	67,143	29.36%	157,069	68.68%	4,480	1.96%	228,692	100.00%	Republican Hold
District 11	101,681	40.47%	140,435	55.90%	9,122	3.63%	251,238	100.00%	Republican Hold
District 12	134,346	65.01%	64,716	31.32%	7,598	3.68%	206,660	100.00%	Democratic Hold
District 13	132,710	79.49%	27,234	16.31%	7,003	4.20%	166,947	100.00%	Democratic Hold
District 14	165,272	77.79%	41,801	19.67%	5,395	2.54%	212,468	100.00%	Democratic Hold
Total	1,519,030	49.17%	1,466,749	47.47%	103,698	3.36%	3,089,477	100.00%	

== Executive ==
=== Governor and lieutenant governor ===
Incumbent Republican Governor Rick Snyder was first elected in 2010 with 58.1% of the vote. He ran for re-election to a second term and defeated former U.S. Representative Mark Schauer in the closest statewide election in 2014.

2014 Michigan gubernatorial election
Party	Candidate	Votes	%	±%
Republican	Rick Snyder (incumbent)	1,607,399	50.92	▼7.19
Democratic	Mark Schauer	1,479,057	46.86	▲6.96
Libertarian	Mary Buzuma	35,723	1.13	▲0.44
Constitution	Mark McFarlin	19,368	0.61	▼0.04
Green	Paul Homeniuk	14,934	0.47	▼0.17
Write-in		50	0.00	
Total votes		3,156,531	100.00	
Republican hold				

=== Secretary of state ===
Incumbent Republican Secretary of State Ruth Johnson was first elected in 2010 with 50.7% of the vote. She won re-election to a second term against attorney Godfrey Dillard.

2014 Michigan Secretary of State election
Party	Candidate	Votes	%	±%
Republican	Ruth Johnson (incumbent)	1,649,047	53.53	▲2.85
Democratic	Godfrey Dillard	1,323,004	42.94	▼2.28
Libertarian	Jamie Lewis	61,112	1.98	▲0.15
Constitution	Robert Gale	34,447	1.12	▼0.19
Natural Law	Jason Gatties	13,185	0.43	New
Total votes		3,080,795	100.00	
Republican hold				

=== Attorney general ===
Incumbent Republican Attorney General Bill Schuette was first elected in 2010 with 52.6% of the vote. He won re-election to a second term against MSU law professor Mark Totten.

2014 Michigan Attorney General election
Party	Candidate	Votes	%	±%
Republican	Bill Schuette (incumbent)	1,603,471	52.11	▼0.48
Democratic	Mark Totten	1,359,839	44.19	▲0.71
Libertarian	Justin Altman	57,345	1.86	▼0.08
Constitution	Gerald Van Sickle	30,762	1.00	▼0.94
Green	John La Pietra	25,747	0.84	New
Total votes		3,077,164	100.00	
Republican hold				

== Legislature ==
All seats of the Michigan Legislature were up for election. The Senate elects its members to four year terms, while the House of Representatives members are elected to two year terms. Republicans retained control of both chambers and made small gains in seats.

Senate
Party	Before	After	Change
Republican	26	27	▲1
Democratic	12	11	▼1
Total	38	38	

House of Representatives
Party	Before	After	Change
Republican	59	63	▲4
Democratic	51	47	▼4
Total	110	110	

== Judiciary ==
=== Supreme Court ===
2014 Michigan Supreme Court election
- November 4, 2014

3 seats of the Supreme Court of Michigan
	Majority party	Minority party
Party	Republican	Democratic
Last election	5	2
Seats won	2	1
Seat change	Steady	Steady

==== General election ====
2014 Michigan Associate Justice election (Full term)
- November 4, 2014
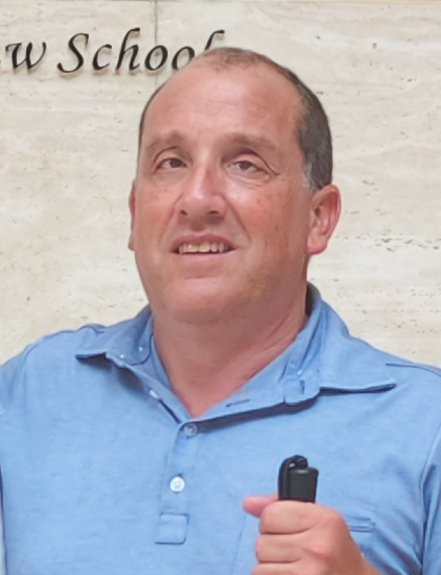
Candidate	Brian K. Zahra	Richard H. Bernstein
Party	Nonpartisan	Nonpartisan
Popular vote	1,450,326	1,301,254
Percentage	32.19%	28.88%
- County results Zahra: 20–30% 30–40% Bernstein: 30–40%
Elected Justice
TBD

2014 Michigan Supreme Court election
Party	Candidate	Votes	%
Nonpartisan	Brian K. Zahra (incumbent)	1,450,326	32.19
Nonpartisan	Richard H. Bernstein	1,301,254	28.88
Nonpartisan	James Robert Redford	934,029	20.73
Nonpartisan	Bill Murphy	637,741	14.15
Nonpartisan	Doug Dern	182,543	4.05
Total votes		4,505,893	100.00
Republican hold			
Democratic hold			

==== Special election ====
2014 Michigan Supreme Court Associate Justice (Term ending 01/01/2017) election
- November 4, 2014
Candidate	David Viviano	Deborah Thomas
Party	Nonpartisan	Nonpartisan
Popular vote	1,521,035	706,971
Percentage	62.14%	28.88%
- County results Viviano: 40–50% 50–60% 60–70% 70–80%
Justice before election
David Viviano
Elected Justice
David Viviano

2014 Michigan Supreme Court special election
Party	Candidate	Votes	%
Nonpartisan	David Viviano (incumbent)	1,521,035	62.14
Nonpartisan	Deborah Thomas	706,971	28.88
Nonpartisan	Kerry Morgan	219,892	8.98
Total votes		2,447,898	100.00
Republican hold			

== Michigan State Board of Education ==
2014 Michigan Board of Education election
Party	Candidate	Votes	%
Democratic	Pamela Pugh Smith	1,368,790	24.47
Democratic	Casandra E. Ulbrich (incumbent)	1,309,760	23.42
Republican	Maria Carl	1,279,122	22.87
Republican	Jonathan Tade Williams	1,206,419	21.57
Libertarian	Kimberly Moore	114,666	2.05
Constitution	John Adams	82,511	1.48
Libertarian	Gregory Scott Stempfle	75,702	1.35
Constitution	Karen Adams	65,828	1.18
Green	Sherry A. Wells	60,516	1.08
Natural Law	Nikki Mattson	30,099	0.54
Total votes		5,593,413	100.00
Democratic hold			
Democratic hold			

== Ballot measures ==
Proposal 1 (August)
- Eliminate Personal Property Tax

Results
Choice	Votes	%
Yes	863,459	69.29%
No	382,770	30.71%
Total votes	1,246,229	100.00%
County results
Yes
70–80%
60–70%

=== Proposal 1 (August) ===
Proposal 1 (August) Eliminate Personal Property Tax
Choice	Votes	%
For	863,459	69.29
Against	382,770	30.71
Total	1,246,229	100.00

Proposal 1 (November)
- A referendum to uphold the legalization of wolf hunting

Results
Choice	Votes	%
Yes	1,318,080	45.07%
No	1,606,328	54.93%
Total votes	2,924,408	100.00%
County results
Yes
80–90%
70–80%
60–70%
50–60%
No
60–70%
50–60%

=== Proposal 1 (November) ===
Proposal 1 (November) A referendum to uphold the legalization of wolf hunting
Choice	Votes	%
For	1,318,080	45.07
Against	1,606,328	54.93
Total	2,924,408	100.00

Proposal 2
- A referendum to uphold a law allowing the Michigan Natural Resources Commission to classify game animals and hunting seasons

Results
Choice	Votes	%
Yes	1,051,426	36.16%
No	1,856,603	63.84%
Total votes	2,908,029	100.00%
County results
Yes
60–70%
50–60%
No
70–80%
60–70%
50–60%

=== Proposal 2 ===
Proposal 2 A referendum to uphold a law allowing the Michigan Natural Resources Commission to classify game animals and hunting seasons
Choice	Votes	%
For	1,051,426	36.16
Against	1,856,603	63.84
Total	2,908,029	100.00

== See also ==
- Elections in Michigan
- 2014 United States elections
