= 2018 Michigan Proposal 2 =

Proposal 2
- November 6, 2018
- A proposed constitutional amendment to establish a commission of citizens with exclusive authority to adopt district boundaries for the Michigan Senate, Michigan House of Representatives and U.S. Congress, every 10 years.

Results
Choice	Votes	%
Yes	2,516,998	61.28%
No	1,590,638	38.72%
Total votes	4,107,636	100.00%
Yes
70–80%
60–70%
50–60%
No
60–70%
50–60%

Michigan Proposal 18-2 was a ballot initiative approved by voters in Michigan as part of the 2018 United States elections. The proposal was created in preparation of the 2020 United States census, to move control of redistricting from the state legislature to an independent commission. The commission consists of thirteen members selected randomly by the secretary of state: four affiliated with Democrats, four affiliated with Republicans, and five independents. Any Michigan voter can apply to be a commissioner, as long as they have not been, in the last six years, a politician or lobbyist. Proponents argued that Michigan's current districts are gerrymandered, giving an unfair advantage to the Republican Party. Opponents argued that the process would give the secretary of state too much power over redistricting, and that the people on the commission would be unlikely to understand principles of redistricting. The proposal was approved with 61.28% of the vote.

== History ==
=== Background ===
2016 Michigan House of Representatives election results. Despite getting a nearly even share of the votes (49.2%–49.13%), Republicans won 63 seats to Democrats' 47.

Following the 2010 midterms in Michigan, Republicans controlled the Michigan state government, and therefore controlled redistricting. The districts they created were gerrymandered to give a partisan advantage to Republicans. In the 2012 Michigan House of Representatives election, Democrats won 53.97% of the vote, compared to 46.03% for Republicans. Despite this, Republicans won 59 seats, to Democrats' 51. A similar result occurred in 2016, with a nearly even vote (49.2%–49.13%) leading to a 16-seat advantage for Republicans.

On April 25, 2019, a three-judge panel of the United States District Court for the Eastern District of Michigan ruled in League of Women Voters of Michigan v. Benson that the districting for the Michigan House of Representatives, the Michigan Senate, and the Michigan's delegation to the United States House of Representatives were unconstitutional partisan gerrymandering. On April 30, 2019, the two sets of intervenors appealed to the Supreme Court of the United States, which on May 24 granted their applications to stay the remedial map-drawing process pending appeal. On June 27, 2019, the Supreme Court of the United States vacated the federal district court's ruling in the landmark decision in Rucho v. Common Cause, dismissing partisan gerrymandering claims as non-justiciable by federal courts.

=== Ballot access ===
Proposal 18-2 was a citizen-led ballot initiative, supported by the 501(c)(4) organization Voters Not Politicians, founded by Katie Fahey. Voters Not Politicians organized the collection of more than 425,000 signatures from registered Michigan voters to allow the proposal to appear on the ballot.

== Contents ==
The proposal appeared on the ballot as follows:

A proposed constitutional amendment to establish a commission of citizens with exclusive authority to adopt district boundaries for the Michigan Senate, Michigan House of Representatives and U.S. Congress, every 10 years.

This proposed constitutional amendment would:

- Create a commission of 13 registered voters randomly selected by the secretary of state:
  - 4 each who self-identify as affiliated with the 2 major political parties; and
  - 5 who self-identify as unaffiliated with major political parties.
- Prohibit partisan officeholders and candidates, their employees, certain relatives, and lobbyists from serving as commissioners.
- Establish new redistricting criteria including geographically compact and contiguous districts of equal population, reflecting Michigan's diverse population and communities of interest. Districts shall not provide disproportionate advantage to political parties or candidates.
- Require an appropriation of funds for commission operations and commissioner compensation.

== Results ==
Proposal 2
Choice	Votes	%
For	2,516,998	61.28
Against	1,590,638	38.72
Total	4,107,636	100.00

The proposal was passed easily, requiring a simple majority. Washtenaw, Ingham, and Marquette counties had the highest percentage of yes vote, while Missaukee, Montmorency, Sanilac, and Osceola counties had the highest percentage of no vote. The proposal passed in 67 of Michigan's 83 counties with strong support across the state.

== Post-election events ==
=== 2020 redistricting ===
250,000 applications to serve on the commission were randomly mailed out by the Michigan secretary of state on December 30, 2019. More than 6,200 Michiganders applied to be part of the redistricting commission before the June 1, 2020, deadline. 200 semi-finalists were selected at random by the accounting firm Rehmann LLC by the end of June. The commission finished drawing maps for the Michigan House of Representatives, the Michigan Senate, and the United States House of Representatives in December 2021.

On March 23, 2022, a group of nineteen African-American Detroiters who live in thirteen different Michigan House and Senate districts in portions of Detroit sued the MICRC for violating the Equal Protection Clause of the United States Constitution and the Voting Rights Act. On December 21, 2023, a three-judge panel of the United States District Court for the Western District of Michigan determined in Agee v. Benson that the MICRC "overwhelmingly - indeed, inescapably" drew the boundaries of the plaintiffs' districts predominantly on the basis for race. The three-judge panel enjoined further use of the Michigan House and Michigan Senate maps drawn by the MICRC and ordered the maps to be redrawn.

=== 2022 elections ===
The commission's new maps went into effect for the 2022 elections. The redrawn maps were seen as instrumental for Democratic victories in the State House and State Senate, taking control of the latter for the first time since 1984.

== See also ==
- 2018 Michigan Proposal 3 – 2018 ballot initiative to add voting policies to the state constitution, such as straight-ticket voting and same-day voter registration
- List of Michigan ballot measures
- Michigan Regulation and Taxation of Marihuana Act – 2018 ballot initiative to legalize Marijuana in Michigan
