= List of justices of the Michigan Supreme Court =

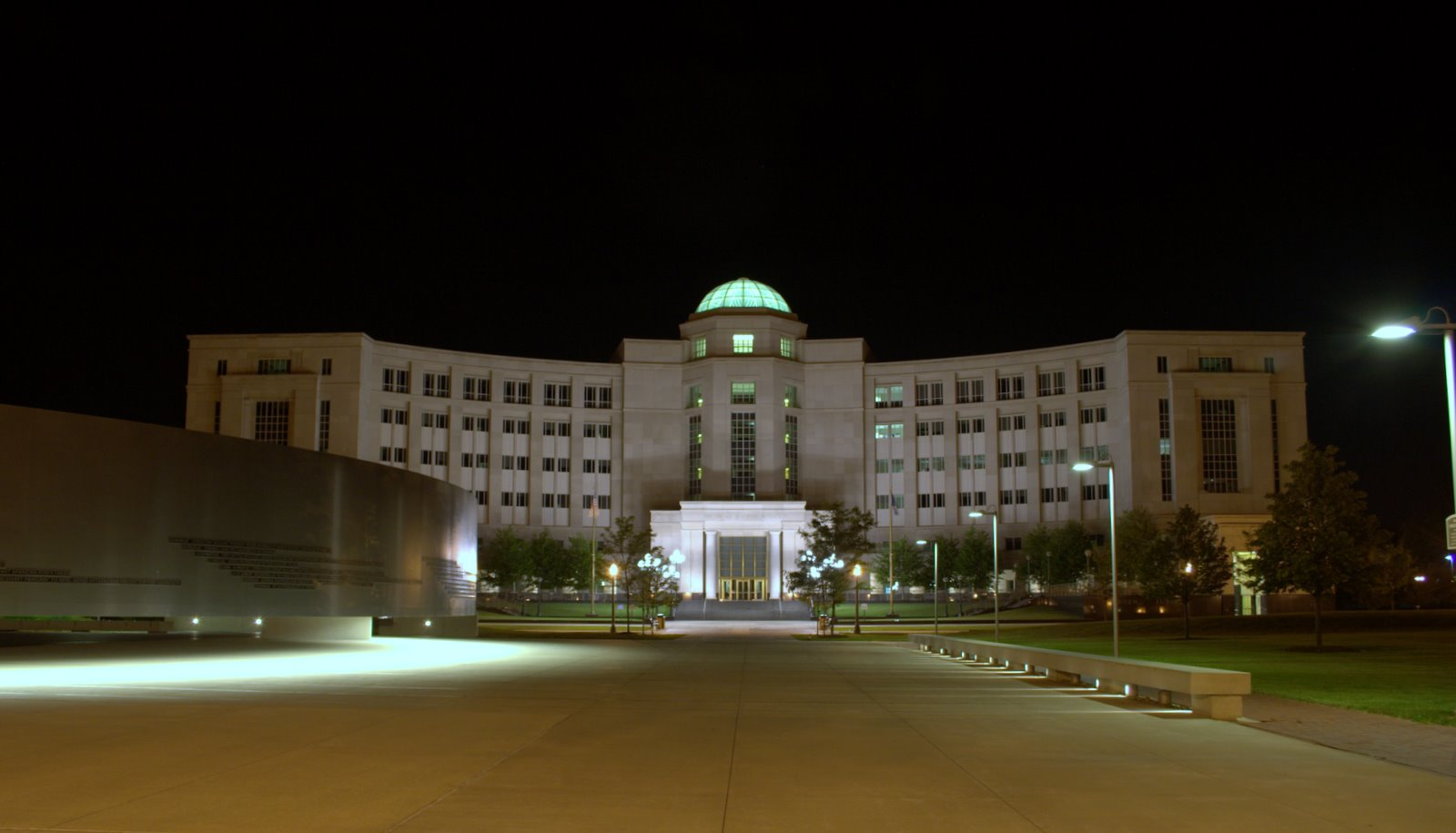
Frontal view of the Michigan Hall of Justice.

Following is a list of justices of the Michigan Supreme Court.

== Current justices ==
Justice	Service began	Current term expires	Mandatory retirement deadline	Appointing governor	Party affiliation	Law school attended
Megan Cavanagh (Chief Justice)	Jan. 1, 2019	Jan. 1, 2027	Jan. 1, 2043	n/a	Democratic	Wayne State
Brian K. Zahra	Jan. 15, 2011	Jan. 1, 2031	Jan. 1, 2031	Rick Snyder (R) (Note: Elected afterward in their own right.)	Republican	Detroit Mercy
Richard H. Bernstein	Jan. 1, 2015	Jan. 1, 2031	Jan. 1, 2047	n/a	Democratic	Northwestern
Elizabeth M. Welch	Jan. 1, 2021	Jan. 1, 2029	Jan. 1, 2045	n/a	Democratic	Ohio State
Kyra Harris Bolden	Jan. 1, 2023	Jan. 1, 2029	Jan. 1, 2061	Gretchen Whitmer (D)	Democratic	Detroit Mercy
Kimberly Thomas	Jan. 1, 2025	Jan. 1, 2033	Jan. 1, 2049	n/a	Democratic	Harvard
Noah Hood	May 27, 2025	January 1, 2026	January 1, 2060	Gretchen Whitmer (D)	Democratic	Harvard

== Chief justices ==
=== Michigan Territory ===
- Augustus B. Woodward
- Solomon Sibley

=== Statehood ===
No.	Chief Justice	Tenure as Chief Justice	Tenure on Supreme Court
1	William A. Fletcher	1836–1842	1836–1842
2	George Morell	1842–1843	1836–1843
3	Epaphroditus Ransom	1843–1848	1837–1848
4	Charles W. Whipple	1848–1852	1839–1855
5	Warner Wing	1852–1854	1845–1856
6	Sanford M. Green	1855–1856	1848–1857
7	Abner Pratt	1856–1857	1850–1857
8	George Martin	1858–1867	1851–1867
9	Thomas M. Cooley	1868–1870	1864–1885
10	James V. Campbell	1870–1872	1858–1890
11	Isaac P. Christiancy	1872–1874	January 1, 1858 – February 27, 1875
12	Benjamin F. Graves	1874–1876	1857, 1868–1883
13	Thomas M. Cooley	1876–1878	1864–1885
14	James V. Campbell	1878–1880	1858–1890
15	Isaac Marston	1880–1881	1875–1883
16	Benjamin F. Graves	1882–1883	1857, 1868–1883
17	Thomas M. Cooley	1884–1885	1864–1885
18	James V. Campbell	1885	1858–1890
19	Allen B. Morse	1885	1885–1891
20	Thomas R. Sherwood	1886–1889	1883–1889
21	James V. Campbell	1890	1858–1890
22	John W. Champlin	1890–1892	1884–1891
23	John W. McGrath	1892	1891–1895
24	Frank A. Hooker	1893	1893–1911
25	John W. McGrath	1894–1895	1891–1895
26	Charles D. Long	1895–1898	1888–1902
27	Claudius B. Grant	1898–1899	1890–1909
28	Robert Morris Montgomery	1900–1901	1892–1910
29	Frank A. Hooker	1902–1903	1893–1911
30	Joseph B. Moore	1904–1905	1896–1925
31	Aaron V. McAlvay	1907	1905–1915
32	Claudius B. Grant	1908	1890–1909
24	Charles A. Blair	1909	1905–1912
25	John E. Bird	1910	1910–1928
26	Russell C. Ostrander	1911	1905–1919
27	Joseph B. Moore	1912	1896–1925
28	Joseph H. Steere	1913	1911–1927
29	Aaron V. McAlvay	1914	1905–1915
30	Flavius L. Brooke	1915	1908–1921
31	John W. Stone	1916	1910–1924
32	Franz C. Kuhn	1917–1918	1917–1929
33	John E. Bird	1919	1910–1928
34	Joseph B. Moore	1920	1896–1925
35	Joseph H. Steere	1921	1911–1927
36	Grant Fellows	1922	1917–1929
37	Howard Wiest	1923	1921–1945
38	George M. Clark	1924	1919–1933
39	John S. McDonald	1925	1922–1933
40	John E. Bird	1926	1910–1928
41	Nelson Sharpe	1927	1919–1935
42	Richard C. Flannigan	1928	1927–1928
43	Louis H. Fead	1928	1928–1937
44	Walter Harper North	1929	1927–1952
45	Henry M. Butzel	1930–1931	1929–1955
46	George M. Clark	1932	1919–1933
47	John S. McDonald	1933	1922–1933
48	Nelson Sharpe	1934	1919–1935
49	William W. Potter	1935	1928–1940
50	Walter Harper North	1936	1927–1952
51	Louis H. Fead	1937	1928–1937
52	Howard Wiest	1938	1921–1945
53	Henry M. Butzel	1939	1929–1955
54	George E. Bushnell	1940	1934–1955
55	Edward M. Sharpe	1941	1934–1957
56	Bert D. Chandler	1942	1937–1943
57	Emerson R. Boyles	1943	1940–1956
58	Walter Harper North	1944	1927–1952
59	Raymond Wesley Starr	1945	1941–1946
60	Henry M. Butzel	1946	1929–1955
61	Leland W. Carr	1947	1941–1963
62	George E. Bushnell	1948	1934–1955
63	Edward M. Sharpe	1949	1934–1957
64	Emerson R. Boyles	1950	1940–1956
65	Neil E. Reid	1951	1944–1956
66	Clark J. Adams	1952	1952–1953
67	John R. Dethmers	1953	1946–1970
68	Henry M. Butzel	1954	1929–1955
69	Leland W. Carr	1955	1941–1963
70	John R. Dethmers	1956–1962	1946–1970
71	Leland W. Carr	1962–1963	1941–1963
72	Thomas M. Kavanagh	1964–1967	January 1, 1958 – April 19, 1975
73	John R. Dethmers	1967–1969	1946–1970
74	Thomas E. Brennan	1969–1971	January 1, 1967 – December 31, 1973
75	Thomas M. Kavanagh	1971–1974	January 1, 1958 – April 19, 1975
76	Thomas G. Kavanagh	1975–1979	January 1, 1969 – December 31, 1984
77	Mary S. Coleman	1979–1982	January 1, 1973 – December 24, 1982
78	John W. Fitzgerald	1982	January 7, 1974 – December 31, 1982
79	G. Mennen Williams	1983–1986	January 1, 1971 – December 31, 1986
80	Dorothy Comstock Riley	1987–1991	December 9, 1982 – February 16, 1983 and January 1, 1985 – September 1, 1997
81	Michael F. Cavanagh	1991–94	January 1, 1983 – December 31, 2014
82	James H. Brickley	1995–1996	December 27, 1982 – October 1, 1999
83	Conrad L. Mallett Jr.	1997–1998	December 21, 1990 – January 2, 1999
84	Elizabeth A. Weaver	1999–2000	January 1, 1995 – August 26, 2010
85	Maura D. Corrigan	2001–2004	January 1, 1999 – January 14, 2011
86	Clifford W. Taylor	2005–2008	August 21, 1997 – December 31, 2008
87	Marilyn J. Kelly	2009–2010	January 1, 1997 – December 31, 2012
88	Robert P. Young Jr.	2011–2017	December 30, 1998 – April 17, 2017
89	Stephen Markman	2017–2019	October 1, 1999 – December 31, 2020
90	Bridget Mary McCormack	2019–2022	January 1, 2013 – December 31, 2022
91	Elizabeth T. Clement	2022–2025	November 17, 2017 – April 14, 2025
92	Megan Cavanagh	2025–	January 1, 2019 –

== Former justices ==
Judge	Began service	Ended service	Notes
Clark J. Adams	1952	1953	
Paul L. Adams	1962, 1964	1973	
Dennis Archer	1985	1993	
Nathaniel Bacon	1855	1857	
Frederick Bates	1805	1808	Territorial Justice
John E. Bird	1910	1928	
Eugene F. Black	1956	1973	
Charles A. Blair	1905	1912	
Patricia J. Boyle	1983	1998	
Emerson R. Boyles	1940	1956	
Thomas E. Brennan	1967	1973	
James H. Brickley	1983	1999	
Flavius L. Brooke	1909	1921	
George E. Bushnell	1934	1955	
Henry M. Butzel	1929	1955	
Edward Cahill	1890	1890	
James V. Campbell	1858	1890	
William L. Carpenter	1902	1908	
Leland W. Carr	1945	1963	
Michael Cavanagh	1982	2015	
Bert D. Chandler	1936	1943	
John W. Champlin	1884	1892	
Henry C. Chipman	1827	1832	Territorial Justice
Isaac P. Christiancy	1857	1874	
George M. Clark	1919	1933	
Elizabeth T. Clement	2017	2025	
Mary S. Coleman	1973	1982	
Thomas M. Cooley	1864	1885	
Joseph T. Copeland	1852	1857	
Maura Corrigan	1996	2011	
John R. Dethmers	1946	1971	
Alton Davis	2010	2010	
Samuel T. Douglass	1852	1857	
George H. Durand	1892	1892	
George C. Edwards	1956	1961	
Louis H. Fead	1928	1937	
Alpheus Felch	1842	1845	
Grant Fellows	1917	1929	
John Warner Fitzgerald	1974	1982	
Richard C. Flannigan	1928	1928	
William A. Fletcher	1836	1842	1st Justice
Daniel Goodwin	1843	1846	
Claudius B. Grant	1890	1909	
Benjamin F. Graves	1868	1883	
Sanford M. Green	1848	1857	
John Griffin	1805	1824	Territorial Justice
Robert P. Griffin	1987	1994	
Diane Hathaway	2008	2013	
Frank A. Hooker	1893	1911	
John Hunt	1824	1827	Territorial Justice
David Johnson	1852	1857	
Thomas G. Kavanagh	1969	1984	
Thomas M. Kavanagh	1958	1975	
Harry F. Kelly	1954	1971	
Marilyn J. Kelly	1997	2012	
Mary Beth Kelly	2011	2015	
Frank C. Kuhn	1912	1919	
Joan Larsen	2015	2017	
Edwin Lawrence	1857	1857	
Charles Levin	1973	1996	
Lawrence Lindemer	1975	1976	
Charles D. Long	1888	1902	
Conrad L. Mallett Jr.	1990	1998	
Randolph Manning	1858	1864	
Stephen Markman	1999	2020	
Isaac Marston	1875	1883	
George Martin	1851	1867	
Thomas Francis McAllister	1938	1941	
Aaron V. McAlvay	1905	1915	
Bridget Mary McCormack	2013	2022	
John S. McDonald	1922	1933	
John W. McGrath	1890	1895	
George Miles	1846	1850	
Robert Morris Montgomery	1892	1910	
Blair Moody Jr.	1977	1982	
Joseph B. Moore	1895	1925	
George Morell	1832; 1836	1836; 1843	Territorial Justice; State Justice
Allen B. Morse	1885	1892	
Edward Mundy	1848	1851	
Walter Harper North	1927	1952	
Michael D. O'Hara	1963	1968	
Russell C. Ostrander	1905	1919	
Rollin H. Person	1915	1917	
William W. Potter	1928	1940	
Abner Pratt	1850	1857	
Epaphroditus Ransom	1837	1848	
Neil E. Reid	1944	1956	
Dorothy Comstock Riley	1982; 1985	1983; 1997	
James L. Ryan	1975	1985	
Edward M. Sharpe	1934	1957	
Nelson Sharpe	1919	1935	
Thomas R. Sherwood	1883	1889	
Solomon Sibley	1827	1837	Territorial Justice
Otis M. Smith	1961	1967	
Talbot Smith	1955	1961	
Ernest A. Snow	1926	1927	
Theodore Souris	1960	1968	
Raymond W. Starr	1941	1946	
Joseph H. Steere	1911	1927	
John W. Stone	1910	1922	
John Swainson	1971	1975	
Clifford W. Taylor	1997	2009	
Harry S. Toy	1935	1937	
Josiah Turner	1857	1857	
John D. Voelker (a/k/a Robert Traver)	1957	1959	
David Viviano	2013	2024	
Thomas A. E. Weadock	1933	1933	
Elizabeth Weaver	1994	2010	
Charles W. Whipple	1839	1855	
Kurtis T. Wilder	2017	2018	
Howard Wiest	1921	1945	
Ross Wilkins	1832	1837	Territorial Justice
G. Mennen Williams	1970	1987	
Edward H. C. Wilson	1856	1857	
Warner Wing	1845	1856	
Benjamin F. H. Witherell	1857	1857	
James Witherell	1808	1828	Territorial Justice
William Woodbridge	1828	1832	Territorial Justice
Augustus B. Woodward	1805	1824	1st Territorial Justice
Robert P. Young Jr.	1998	2017	
