= Howard Wiest =

American judge (1864–1945)

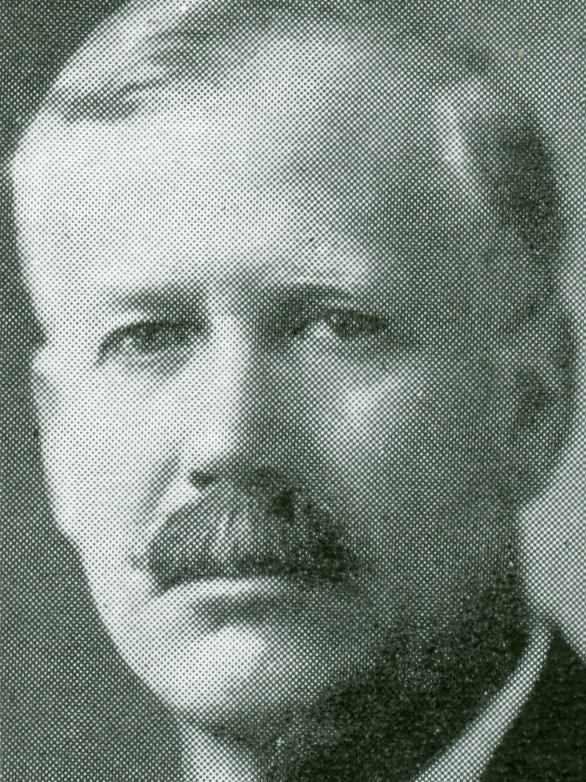
- Wiest circa 1927

Chief Justice of the Supreme Court of Michigan Justice of the Supreme Court
- In office 1921–1945
- Nominated by: Alex Groesbeck
- Preceded by: Flavius L. Brooke
- Succeeded by: Leland W. Carr

Personal details
- Born: February 24, 1864 Washington Township, Macomb County, Michigan, U.S.
- Died: September 16, 1945 (aged 81) Lansing, Michigan, U.S.
- Resting place: Mount Hope Cemetery; Lansing, Michigan, U.S.
- Occupation: lawyer; jurist

Howard Wiest (February 24, 1864 – September 16, 1945) was an American jurist. Although he neither graduated from high school nor attended law school, he read law, became Chief Justice of the Michigan Supreme Court, and went on to be "the Dean" of all Michigan jurists.

== Background ==
Born in Washington Township, Macomb County, Michigan, to Jacob and Elizabeth Wiest, he had eight siblings. He attended school in Pontiac, Michigan, but "never finished high school." Wiest left school and worked as a machinist, and never attended law school. (Note: "Without the benefit of a college legal training, Wiest rose from a youthful steamfitters job and became known as one of the unique characters of Michigan jurisprudence.")

He then moved to Detroit, Michigan, read law at the Detroit law firm of Atkinson & Atkinson, and was admitted to the Michigan bar in 1885. He was appointed commissioner of the Wayne County Michigan Circuit Courts by Governor Cyrus Luce. In April, 1890 he started ten years in private practice in Ingham County.

On December 19, 1888, he married Cora Newman of Pontiac, and they had two children: Lucille Wiest and Theodosia Milkton (of Baltimore, Maryland).

He was a Republican.

== Judicial career ==
From 1900 to 1921, Wiest served as an Ingham County, Michigan, 30th Judicial Circuit Court judge, which occasioned him to hear many important cases involving the State of Michigan. (Note: See decision regarding an attempt by the Michigan Power Company to compete with the Lansing Board of Water & Light, which decision was affirmed by the Michigan Supreme Court.)

His name first appears at 213 Michigan Reports 95. He served in a judicial capacity for 44 continuous years.

In 1913 he delivered a paper entitled "Districting the Judicial Circuits" to the State Bar of Michigan.

In 1916 he became the first to fill the statutorily created position of "presiding Circuit Judge" in Michigan.

In 1921, based on his experience and record in the Circuit Court Wiest was appointed to the Michigan Supreme Court by Governor Alex Groesbeck to fill the seat vacated upon the death of Flavius L. Brooke. He served as a Justice for twenty-four and one-half years, until his death in 1945. He was the chief justice in 1923, 1930, 1938. Wiest died in a Lansing, Michigan hospital. An Honorary Doctor of Laws was conferred upon him by the University of Michigan Law School in 1935. More than 1,400 opinions he authored appeared in 96 volumes of the Michigan Supreme Court Reports. He participated in deciding over ten thousand cases. His opinions had substantial impact on the state's decisional law.

The Supreme Court Historical Society wryly noted:

He was personally slow to accept changing times. The paradox lies in the fact that his personal preferences found no reflection in his holdings. For instance, while the automobile affected day-to-day life, Wiest retained a personal preference for travel by rail and by horse and carriage. While the electric age affected daily lives, Wiest retained his personal preference for illuminating gas and kerosene lamps

Justice Wiest had a large estate, called "Shagbark" on Rowley Road in Williamston, Michigan. (Note: In the tradition of The Great Gatsby, unsubstantiated but persistent rumors claim that Presidents Warren G. Harding and Calvin Coolidge, Federal District Court judge/Commissioner of Major League Baseball Kenesaw Mountain Landis, and various movie stars attended these events.) He himself mixed the mortar and laid the brick "for several commodious buildings" to house his 10,000 volume personal library. He regularly feted a large Ox roast summer dinner, the culmination of which was in 1940 when 1,200 notable guests gathered, including the president of the American Bar Association and prominent members of government and the judiciary.

In 1931 he is listed as the Ex officio president and on the Board of Governors of The Lawyers' Club, University of Michigan.

== Death and legacy ==
He died in hospital after a few years of decline, but a relatively short illness. When he died he was "the Dean of all Michigan jurists in point of service" and the "oldest member of the state's highest tribunal." (Note: As of his demise, "It fell to the lot of Justice WIEST to serve as a member of this Court for more years than any other justice with two exceptions–Justice CAMPBELL and Justice MOORE." James V. Campbell (1823–1890) was a member of the Michigan Supreme Court from 1858–1890. Joseph B. Moore (1845–1930) served from 1896 to 1925 at age 80.)

He was the subject of a portrait executed in 1946 by Detroit artist Roy C. Gamble (1887–1972) which hangs at the Supreme Court. The portrait joins nine others by Gamble of Chief Justices. (Note: The other Chief Justices painted by Gamble are: Honorable George E. Bushnell, Hon. Henry M. Butzel, Hon. Leland Carr, Hon. Bert D. Chandler, Hon. George Clark, Hon. Louis H. Fead, Hon. William Potter, Hon. Raymond Starr and Hon. Harry Toy. Inexplicably, this portrait is not listed in the following source.)

His remains are interred at Mount Hope Cemetery in Lansing, Michigan.

Leland W. Carr was appointed as his successor by Governor Harry F. Kelly in 1945.
