= Louis H. Fead =

American judge (1877–1943)

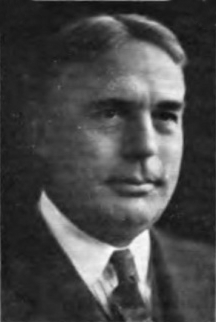

Justice of the Michigan Supreme Court
- In office 1928–1937
- Nominated by: Fred W. Green
- Preceded by: Richard C. Flannigan

Personal details
- Born: May 2, 1877 Lexington, Michigan, US
- Died: February 4, 1943 (aged 65) Ann Arbor, Michigan, US
- Education: Olivet College; Detroit College of Law; University of Michigan Law School
- Occupation: lawyer, jurist

Louis H. Fead (May 2, 1877 – February 4, 1943) was an American jurist. He was appointed to the office of chief justice Michigan Supreme Court in 1928 (completing the term of the late Richard C. Flannigan). After completing that term, he served as a justice, later becoming chief justice again. He had been a Grand Master of the Grand Lodge of Michigan Masons.

== Background ==
Born in Lexington, Michigan, he was the eighth of nine children of John Lawrence and Augusta (Walther) Fead. The family operated a wool mill. Louis was valedictorian of his public high school class.

Fead received his bachelor's degree from Olivet College. He attended the Detroit College of Law while working at the Detroit law firm of Bacon & Palmer. He continued his education at University of Michigan Law School and received his law degree there in 1900. Fead then practiced law in Newberry, Michigan, and served as prosecuting attorney for Luce County, Michigan from 1901 to 1913.

On September 19, 1919, Fead married Marion McPherson, of Howell, Michigan, daughter of former State Banking Commissioner Hugh A. McPherson. They had four children: Marion Augusta, William Alexander, Nancy Louise and Louis McPherson. Fead was a Republican and an active Episcopalian.

In World War I, Fead was active in bond drives. He served as a captain overseas in the American Red Cross.

He was a member of the Rotary, Kiwanis, and Lions Clubs. In 1917–18, he was Grand Master of the Grand Lodge of Michigan Masons.

He was vice-president of the Newberry State Bank, and a member of the F. P. Bohn Company of Newberry, Michigan. The move to Newberry saw him enter private practice for a relatively short time; shortly thereafter he served as the prosecuting attorney for Luce County.

== Judicial career ==
From 1913 to 1928, Fead served as a judge in Michigan's 11th Circuit Court, located in Luce County. (Note: Miriam Newmark worked in her last year of high school for the Luce County Prosecuting attorney, Alexander L. Sayles, and Circuit Judge Louis Henry Fead, who both had offices in the Newberry State Bank Building. However, when she matriculated from high school, she moved to New York and quit those jobs.) At the time of his first election, he was one of the youngest elected circuit court judges in the state.

In 1928, Michigan Governor Fred W. Green appointed Fead to complete Richard C. Flannigan's term as Chief Justice of the Michigan Supreme Court. After his term as Chief Justice expired, Fead continued to serve as a Justice of that court, but returned to the Chief Justice position in 1937. The next year, he lost a bid for reelection to Thomas Francis McAllister.

Fead's first reported decision on the Supreme Court was First Church of Christ Scientist v. Rentzei, 242 Mich. 120 (April 3, 1928). He helped decide 5,240 cases in which opinions were served, and wrote more than an estimated 700 opinions. As one of his eulogists noted: "I was always impressed by his practical approach to a legal proposition and the common sense he invariably used in deciding matters; also, his freedom from erudition." Another noted: "His decisions were more sound than spectacular."

When the University of Michigan Law School conferred a Doctor of Laws degree on Fead, it was said:

A progressive exponent of the law, conscientious and courageous in the administration of justice, and esteemed by the citizens of his commonwealth, he maintains the authority and supremacy of the State in its conflict with the disruptive forces of society. Salle [sic] in his keeping are the traditions of an informed judiciary, on whose decisions rest the faith and hopes of democracy?

In 1937, Fead was on the Board of governors of the Lawyers' Club of the University of Michigan

Upon leaving the Michigan Supreme Court, Fead practiced law in Detroit, Michigan.

== Death and legacy ==
Fead died from a heart attack while being treated for throat cancer in a hospital in Ann Arbor, Michigan.

He was the subject of a portrait executed in 1944 by Detroit artist Roy C. Gamble (1887–1972) which hangs at the Michigan Supreme Court building. The portrait joins nine others of Chief Justices of Michigan painted by Gamble. (Note: The Chief Justices painted by Gamble are: Honorable Howard Wiest, Honorable George E. Bushnell, Hon. Henry M. Butzel, Hon. Leland Carr, Hon. Bert D. Chandler, Hon. George Clark, Hon. Louis H. Fead, Hon. William Potter, Hon. Raymond Starr and Hon. Harry Toy. Inexplicably, Weist's portrait is not listed in the following source.)

Fead is interred at Deepdale Memorial Park near Lansing, Michigan.

Six linear feet of his speeches, correspondence, research, scrapbooks, and photographs are held at the Bentley Historical Library at the University of Michigan. Included are "miscellanea relating to Michigan politics and Republican party affairs." Specific subjects included FDR's Supreme Court packing bill, the Newberry State Bank, Masonic affairs, and his World War I service with the American Red Cross in France. Correspondents include: Frank P. Bohn, Prentiss M. Brown, Henry M. Butzel, William G. Fretz, Clare Hoffman, Chase S. Osborn, Henry E. Perry, H. J. Rushton, Alex Sayles, Sam C. Taylor, and Arthur H. Vandenberg.
