= Edward Cahill (judge) =

American judge (1843–1922)

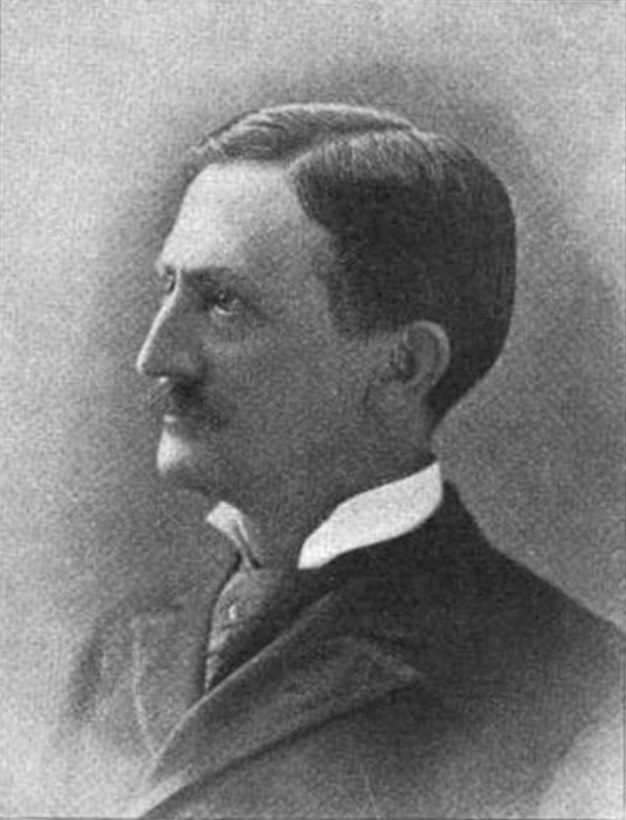

Justice of the Michigan Supreme Court
- In office April 5, 1890 – December 31, 1890
- Appointed by: Cyrus G. Luce
- Preceded by: James V. Campbell
- Succeeded by: John W. McGrath

Personal details
- Born: Edward Cahill; August 3, 1843 Kalamazoo, Michigan
- Died: July 27, 1922 (aged 78) Little Traverse, Michigan
- Spouse: Lucy Crawford
- Children: Clara Cahill Park
- Education: Kalamazoo College

Military service
- Allegiance: United States
- Branch/service: Union Army
- Rank: Captain
- Battles/wars: American Civil War

Edward Cahill (August 3, 1843 – July 27, 1922) was a justice of the Michigan Supreme Court in 1890.

Cahill was born in Kalamazoo, Michigan. He studied at Kalamazoo College. He served in the Union Army in 1862 but was temporary discharged due to illness. In 1863 "he raised the first African-American Infantry Unit in Michigan and served with these men, eventually attaining the rank of Captain, until the end of the war." Cahill was later a county commissioner for Ionia County, Michigan and the prosecuting attorney for Ingham County, Michigan. He was appointed to the Michigan Supreme Court by Cyrus Luce but lost in his attempt to get elected to fill out the rest of the term.

After his service on the court Cahill was law partners with Russell C. Ostrander who later also was a member of the Michigan Supreme Court.

His Lansing home's foundation was used for the Scott Sunken Garden on a hilltop of Lansing Michigan's Grand River bank.
