= Walter North =

Walter North may refer to:

- Walter E. North, American ambassador
- Walter H. North (1933–2014), American politician, member of the Michigan Senate
- Walter Harper North (1871–1952), American judge, justice and chief justice of the Michigan Supreme Court, grandfather of Walter H. North
