= Edwin Murray MacKay =

American painter (1869–1926)

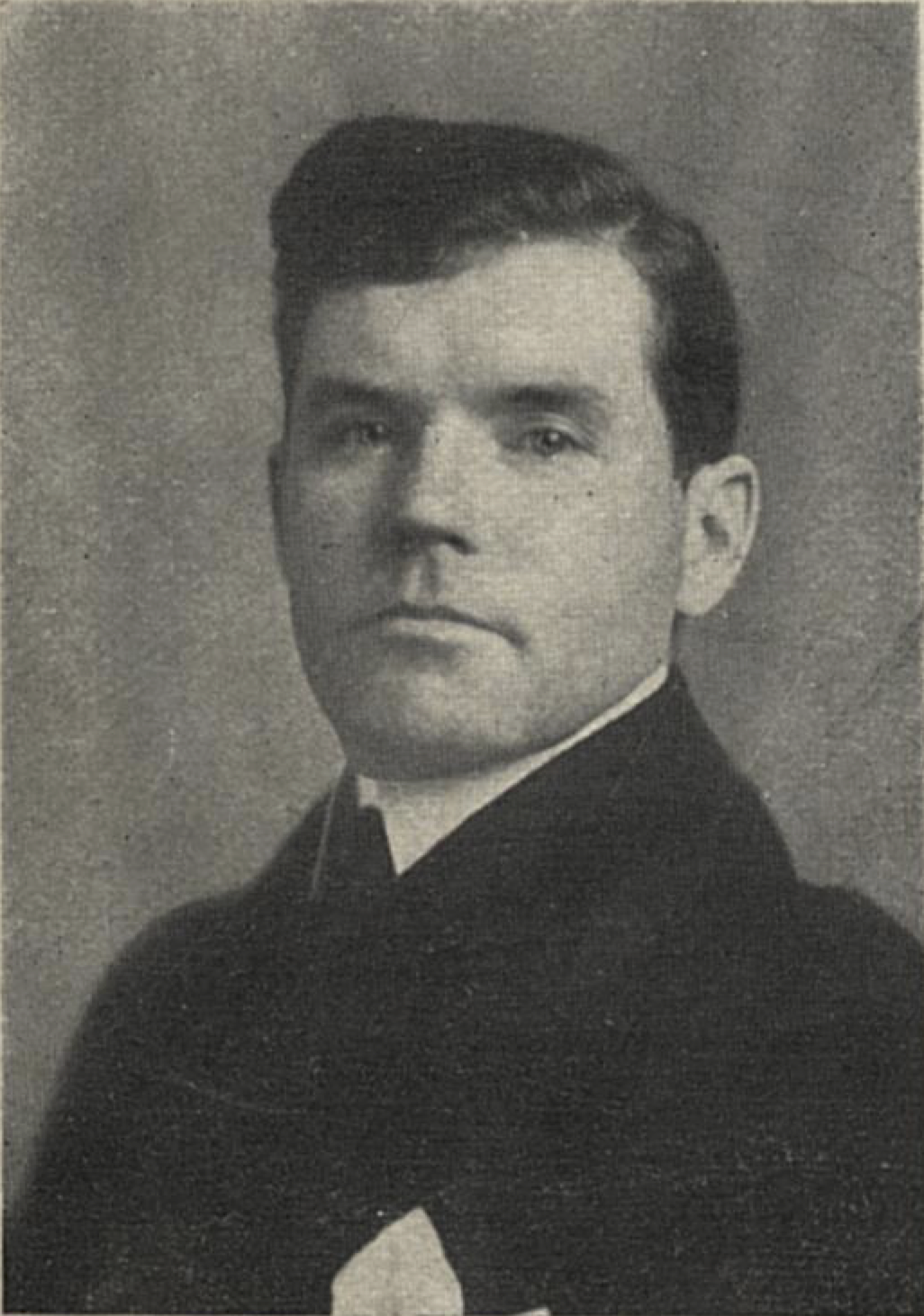
- MacKay in 1907
- Born: September 29, 1869; Sebewaing, Michigan
- Died: February 28, 1926 (aged 56); Detroit
- Resting place: Evergreen Cemetery, Detroit
- Education: Detroit Museum of Art School

Edwin Murray MacKay (September 29, 1869 – February 28, 1926) was an American painter from Michigan.

== Biography ==
Edwin Murray MacKay was born in Sebewaing, Michigan on September 29, 1869. He initially studied at the Detroit Museum of Art School, the art school affiliated with a predecessor of today's Detroit Institute of Arts, and later studied in New York and Paris under Kenyon Cox and Jean-Paul Laurens respectively. MacKay lived and maintained a studio in Paris around the turn of the 20th century, and was known for his portraits.

MacKay wrote an essay in 1921 in Michigan History Magazine, arguing that the state of Michigan should fund a new war memorial and historical library in Lansing. MacKay died of cancer in Detroit on February 28, 1926. Following his death, his widow Frances Woods MacKay donated his painting "A Japanese Print" to the Detroit Institute of Arts.

== Works ==
MacKay painted multiple portraits of Michigan Supreme Court justices in the early 20th century. The portraits include those of Justices Grant Fellows, Aaron V. McAlvay, Russell C. Ostrander, and Joseph H. Steere, some of which remain on display in the Michigan Hall of Justice in Lansing.

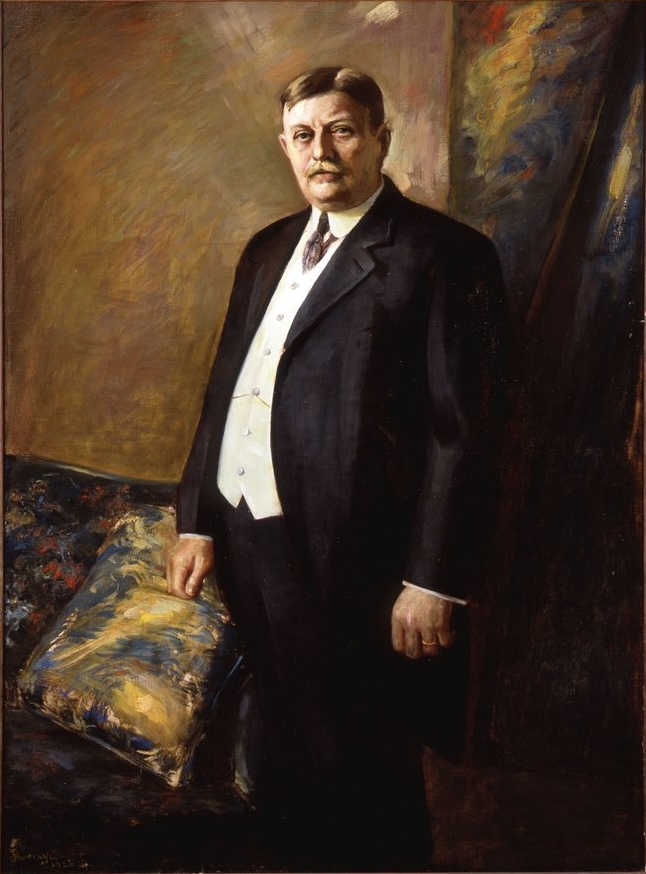
Portrait of Michigan Governor Albert Sleeper, ca. 1920

MacKay painted the official portrait of Michigan Governor Albert Sleeper around 1920, which is on display in the Michigan State Capitol. The Michigan State Capitol Commission considers MacKay's portrait of Sleeper to represent a turning point in the official portraits of Michigan governors, marking a transition to a more artistic and expressive style.
