= Isaac P. Christiancy =

American judge and politician (1812–1890)

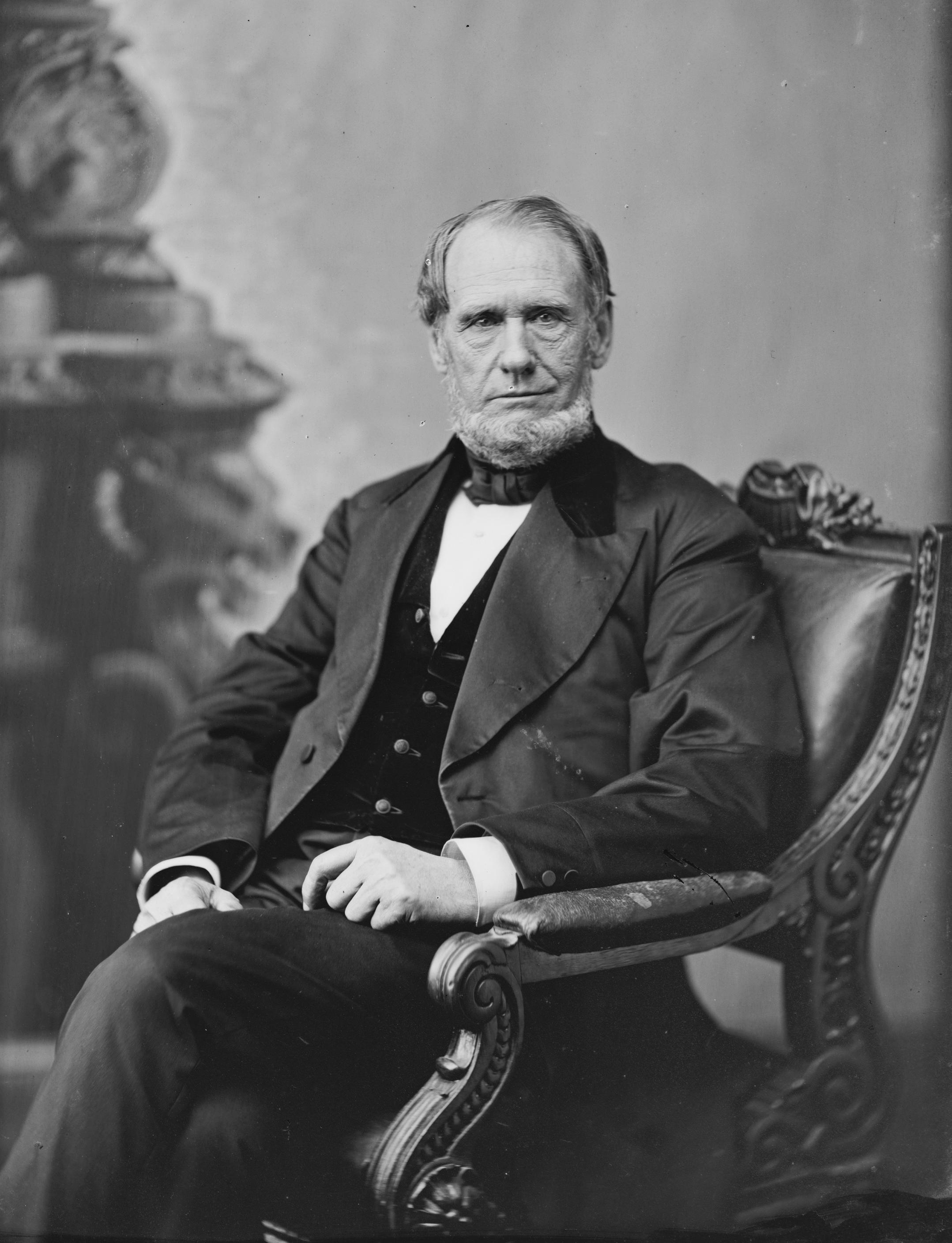
- Christiancy, 1865–1880

United States Senator from Michigan
- In office March 4, 1875 – February 10, 1879
- Preceded by: Zachariah Chandler
- Succeeded by: Zachariah Chandler

Justice of the Michigan Supreme Court
- In office January 1, 1858 – February 27, 1875
- Preceded by: Benjamin F. H. Witherell
- Succeeded by: Isaac Marston

Member of the Michigan Senate
- In office 1850-1852

Personal details
- Born: Isaac Peckham Christiancy; March 12, 1812 Johnstown, New York, US
- Died: September 8, 1890 (aged 78) Lansing, Michigan, US
- Party: Democratic, Free Soil, Republican
- Spouse: Elizabeth E. McClosky
- Profession: Politician, lawyer, judge, teacher

Isaac Peckham Christiancy (March 12, 1812 – September 8, 1890) was chief justice of the Michigan State Supreme Court and U.S. Senator from the state of Michigan.

Christiancy was born near Johnstown, New York in what is now Bleecker, New York to parents of humble means. His grandfather, Isaac Peckham, was one of the first pioneers in Caroga, New York, settling in the area as early as 1783. Christiancy attended the common schools and the Johnstown and Ovid Academies. After his father died when he was 13, he also had to support his family. He taught school and studied law. In 1836, Christiancy was admitted to the bar after moving to Monroe, Michigan, where he obtained a clerkship in a Federal land office. He married Elizabeth E. McClosky on November 16, 1839.

He was prosecuting attorney for Monroe County, Michigan from 1841 to 1846. In 1848 he was a delegate to the Free Soil Party convention in Buffalo, New York, having left the Democratic Party over the question of slavery.

He was a member of the Michigan State Senate from 1850 to 1852 and an unsuccessful Free Soil Party candidate for governor in 1852. He helped to organize the Republican Party in Jackson, Michigan in 1854. He purchased the Monroe Commercial in 1857 and became its editor. He was also an unsuccessful candidate for the U.S. Senate in that year.

Pursuant to the new state constitution adopted in 1850, the Michigan Legislature created a permanent State Supreme Court in 1857. Christiancy was elected as an associate judge of this first permanent Michigan Supreme Court. He was reelected twice and served until February 27, 1875, when he resigned to take the office of U.S. Senator. He served as chief justice from 1872 to 1874. Christiancy is known as one of the "Big Four" of Michigan judicial history for his service while on the court.

He was elected as a Republican to the U.S. Senate in 1874, defeating the incumbent Radical Republican Zachariah Chandler, and served in the 44th and 45th Congresses from March 4, 1875, to February 10, 1879, when he resigned due to ill health. Chandler was elected to retake the seat twelve days later.

At age 65 Christiancy married a woman 45 years younger than him. Senator Thomas W. Ferry acted as best man. The marriage lasted only a short time before they divorced.

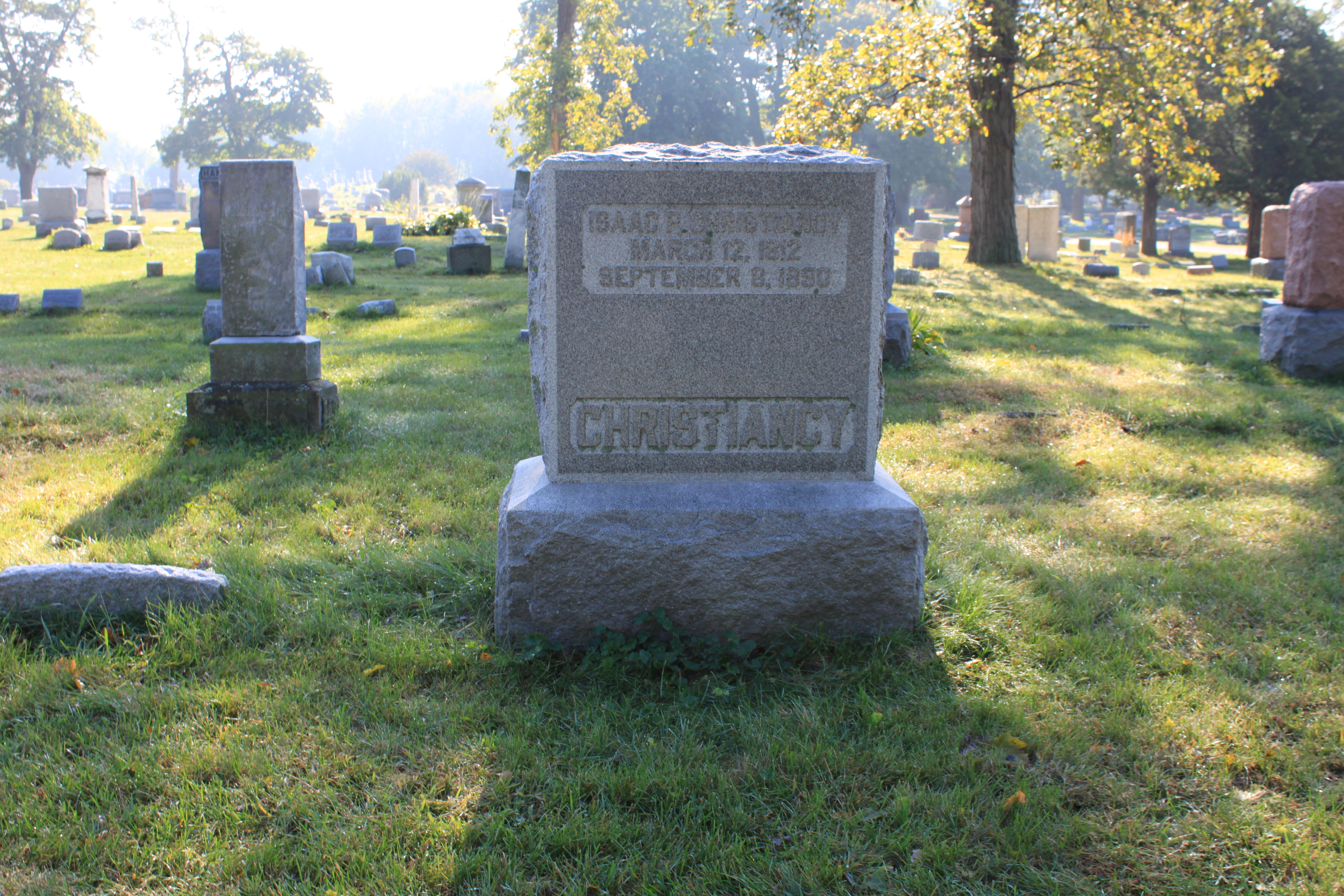
Christiancy grave

He served as Envoy Extraordinary and Minister Plenipotentiary to Peru from 1879 to 1881, after which he returned to Lansing, Michigan to resume the practice of law. During his stay in Peru, Christiancy warned the United States about the rising British influence that was being brought about by Chile during the War of the Pacific. Christiancy also wrote that Peru should be annexed for ten years and then admitted in the Union to provide the United States with access to the rich markets of South America.

He died in Lansing and is interred in Woodlawn Cemetery in Monroe.

His son, James Isaac Christiancy (1844-December 18, 1899), was First Lieutenant, United States Army. He was awarded the Medal of Honor during the American Civil War while serving in Company D, 9th Michigan Volunteer Cavalry. On May 28, 1864, while acting as aide, he voluntarily led a part of the line into the fight, and was twice wounded. The Medal was actually issued on October 10, 1892. He is buried in the Woodland Cemetery in Monroe, Michigan.

The Thomas M. Cooley Law School chapter of Phi Alpha Delta law fraternity is named for him.

Party political offices
First	Free Soil nominee for Governor of Michigan; 1852	Party dissolved
U.S. Senate
Preceded by Zachariah Chandler	U.S. senator (Class 1) from Michigan; March 4, 1875 – February 10, 1879; Served alongside: Thomas W. Ferry	Succeeded by Zachariah Chandler
Diplomatic posts
Preceded by Richard Gibbs	United States Minister to Peru; February 11, 1879 – August 2, 1881	Succeeded by Stephen A. Hurlbut
