= John Champlin =

John Champlin may refer to:

- John W. Champlin (1831–1901), member of the Michigan Supreme Court
- John Denison Champlin Jr. (1834–1915), American non-fiction writer and editor
