= Allen B. Morse =

American politician

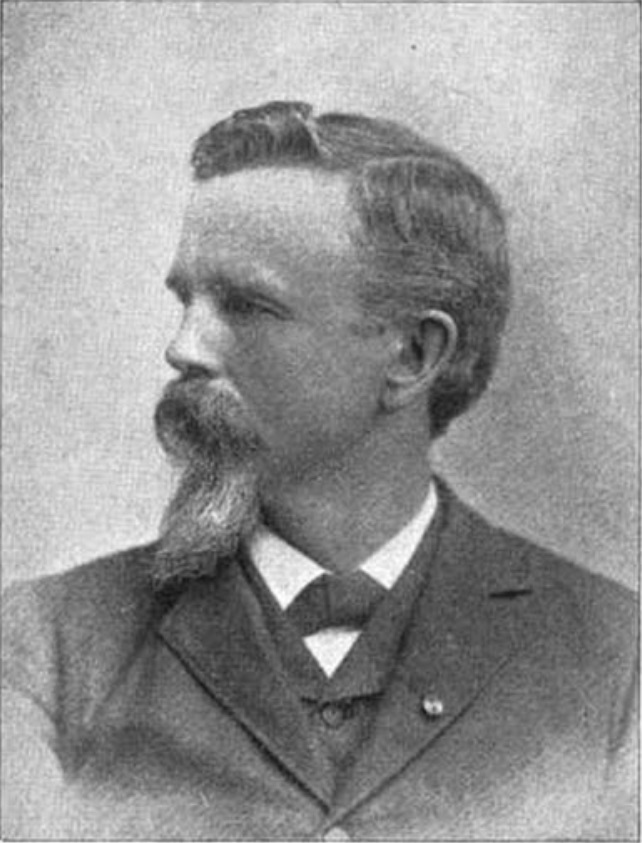
- Michigan Supreme Court Justice Allen Benton Morse

Chief Justice of the Michigan Supreme Court
- In office 1885–1885
- Preceded by: James V. Campbell
- Succeeded by: Thomas R. Sherwood

Associate Justice of the Michigan Supreme Court
- In office 1885–1892

Mayor of Ionia
- In office 1882–1882

Member of the Michigan Senate
- In office 1875–1875

Personal details
- Born: Allen Benton Morse; January 7, 1837 Otisco, Michigan, U.S.
- Died: July 1, 1921 (aged 84) Ionia, Michigan, U.S.
- Party: Democratic (Before 1890s); Republican (After 1890s)
- Education: Michigan State Agricultural College

Military service
- Allegiance: United States of America; Union Army
- Branch/service: 21st Michigan Infantry Regiment
- Battles/wars: American Civil War

Allen Benton Morse (January 7, 1837 – July 1, 1921) was an American diplomat, jurist and politician.

Born in Otisco, Ionia County, Michigan, Morse studied at the Michigan State Agricultural College for two years. He then served in the 21st Michigan Volunteer Infantry Regiment during the American Civil War and was badly wounded losing his left arm. He then studied and then practiced law in Ionia, Michigan. He served as county attorney of Ionia County in 1867. Morse also served on the Ionia City Council and as mayor of Ionia, Michigan in 1882. In 1875, Morse served in the Michigan State Senate and was a Democrat. Morse then served on the Michigan Supreme Court from 1885 to 1892 and was chief justice in 1885. In 1892, Morse sought the Democratic nomination for the Governor of Michigan and lost the race. Morse then served as United States consul, in Glasgow, Scotland from 1893 to 1897. Around this time, Morse switched to the Republican Party. Morse died suddenly at his home in Ionia, Michigan.

== Notable Opinions ==
1. Sherwood v. Walker

== Notes ==
Party political offices
| Preceded by Edwin B. Winans | Democratic nominee for Governor of Michigan; 1892 | Succeeded by Spencer O. Fisher |
