= Attorney General Marston =

Attorney General Marston may refer to:

- George Marston (Massachusetts politician) (1821–1883), Attorney General of Massachusetts
- Isaac Marston (1839–1891), Attorney General of Michigan

== See also ==
- General Marston (disambiguation)
