= Charles D. Long =

American judge (1841–1902)

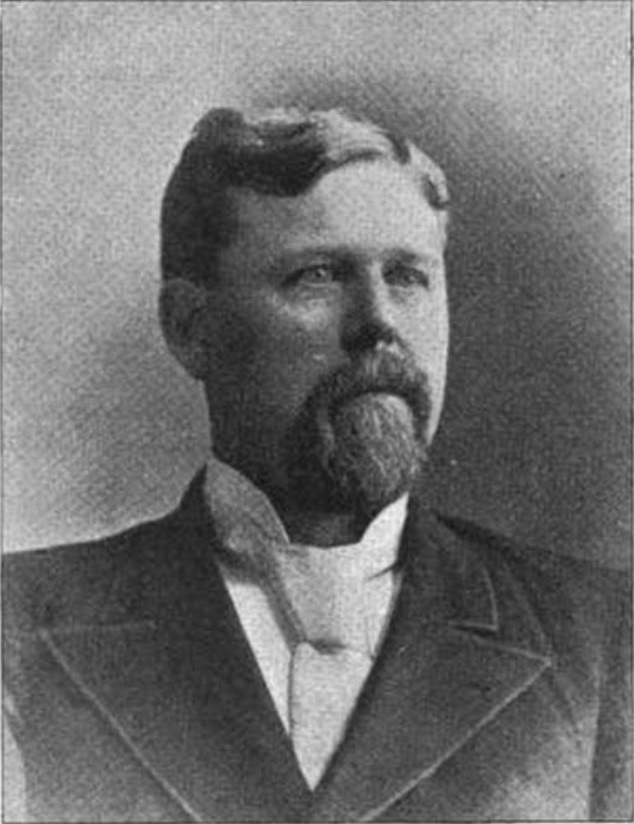
Michigan Supreme Court Justice Charles Dean Long.

Charles Dean Long (June 14, 1841 – June 27, 1902) was a justice of the Michigan Supreme Court from 1888 to 1902.

== Early life and education ==
Born on a farm in the township of Grand Blanc, Genesee County, Michigan, Long was the son of Peter Long, who settled in Michigan in 1840. Long attended the district schools of his native town, and worked on the farm, until he was 13 years old. He then moved to Flint, Michigan, where he attended the high school with a view of preparing for the University of Michigan. During this time, he paid his board and tuition by working for various persons in the city of Flint, and by teaching school in the district schools of the county for four winters.

== Civil War service and injury ==
At the age of 20 he finished his preparatory course, but when the American Civil War broke out, he abandoned his educational plans to join the military. On August 12, 1861, Long enlisted as a private in company A, 8th Michigan Volunteer Infantry Regiment. He went to the front with his company and regiment, and served in the various engagements in which they took part until the Battle of Wilmington Island, Georgia, on April 16, 1862. In that engagement, Long received two severe wounds, with one ball entering his left hip, penetrating the body and lodging in the right groin, where it would remained until his death, and the other causing the loss of his left arm, which was amputated above the elbow. These wounds rendering him unfit for further service in the field, he returned Flint to study law. For the remainder of his life, the wound to his groin had to be dressed twice per day. In the summer of 1862 he joined the law office of Oscar Adams, of Flint.

== Legal and judicial career ==
In the fall of 1864 he was elected to the office of county clerk of Genesee County, holding that office for four successive terms. He was admitted to the bar in the circuit court for the county of Genesee on May 25, 1870. He was elected prosecuting attorney of the Genesee County in the fall of 1874, and was re-elected in 1876 and 1878, holding the office for six years. In 1880 he was one of the four supervisors of census for Michigan, with thirty counties and 413 enumerators under his authority. In 1885 he served as department commander of the Grand Army of the Republic for Michigan. In 1887, the number of Justices on the Michigan Supreme Court was increased from three to five, and Long was elected to one of the new seats for a ten-year term, defeating his opponent for the seat, Charles H. Camp of Saginaw, by a plurality of more than 36,000 votes. Long took his seat on January 1, 1888, and served in that capacity until his death.

Long attended the Presbyterian church, and was a member of the Republican Party.

Political offices
Preceded by Newly created seat.	Justice of the Michigan Supreme Court; 1888–1902	Succeeded by William L. Carpenter
