= John W. Champlin =

American judge

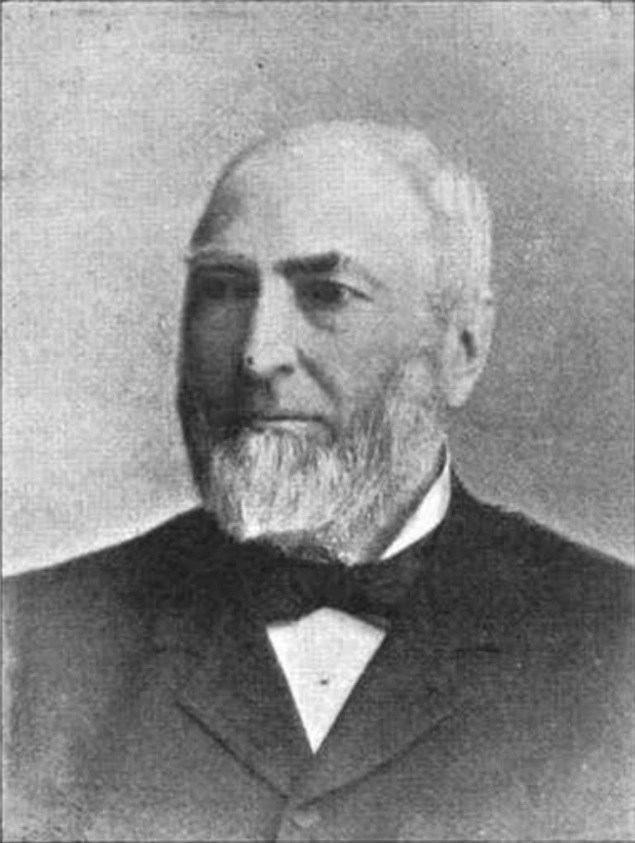

Mayor of Grand Rapids, Michigan
- In office 1867–1868
- Preceded by: Wilder D. Foster
- Succeeded by: Moses V. Aldrich

22nd Chief Justice of the Michigan Supreme Court
- In office 1890–1892
- Preceded by: James V. Campbell
- Succeeded by: John W. McGrath

Justice of the Michigan Supreme Court
- In office 1884–1891
- Preceded by: Benjamin F. Graves
- Succeeded by: George H. Durand

Personal details
- Born: John Wayne Champlin; February 17, 1831 Kingston, New York, U.S.
- Died: July 24, 1901 (aged 70) Grand Rapids, Michigan, U.S.
- Resting place: Fulton Street Cemetery, Grand Rapids, Michigan, U.S.
- Party: Democratic
- Profession: Politician, judge
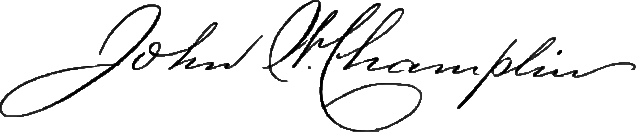
- Signature

John Wayne Champlin (February 17, 1831 – July 24, 1901) was a member of the Michigan Supreme Court from 1884 until 1891.

Champlain was born in Kingston, New York and came to Grand Rapids, Michigan as an adult to study law with his brother. He served as a judge of the Grand Rapids Recorders' Court and then as mayor of Grand Rapids starting in 1867. In 1883 Champlin defeated Austin Blair in the election for the vacant seat on the Michigan Supreme Court.

After leaving the Supreme Court Champlin served as a law professor at the University of Michigan.

== Sources ==
Political offices
Preceded by Wilder D. Foster	Mayor of Grand Rapids, Michigan; 1867	Succeeded by Moses V. Aldrich
Preceded by Benjamin F. Graves	Justice of the Michigan Supreme Court; 1884–1891	Succeeded by George H. Durand
