= Edward H. C. Wilson =

American judge (1820–1870)

Edward Hancock Custis Wilson (August 6, 1820 – November 1, 1870) was a justice of the Michigan Supreme Court from 1856 to 1857.

Born on the Eastern Shore of Maryland, Wilson graduated from Washington & Jefferson College in Pennsylvania at age 18, where he was a classmate of Clement Vallandigham, and then read law to be admitted to the Maryland bar. He moved to Michigan in 1845, where he was prosecuting attorney for Hillsdale County, and for two terms circuit judge.

In November 1856, Governor Kinsley S. Bingham appointed Wilson to a seat on the Michigan Supreme Court vacated by the resignation of Warner Wing. Wilson served for "a little more than a year". Wilson thereafter served as a circuit judge of the Michigan 1st Circuit Court from 1858 to 1863. He died in Denver, Colorado, at the age of 50.

Political offices
Preceded by Warner Wing	Justice of the Michigan Supreme Court; 1856–1857	Succeeded by Court reconstituted
