= Joseph Steere =

Joseph Steere may refer to:

- Joseph Beal Steere (1842–1940), American ornithologist
- Joseph H. Steere (1852–1936), American jurist
