= Nelson Sharpe =

American judge (1858–1935)

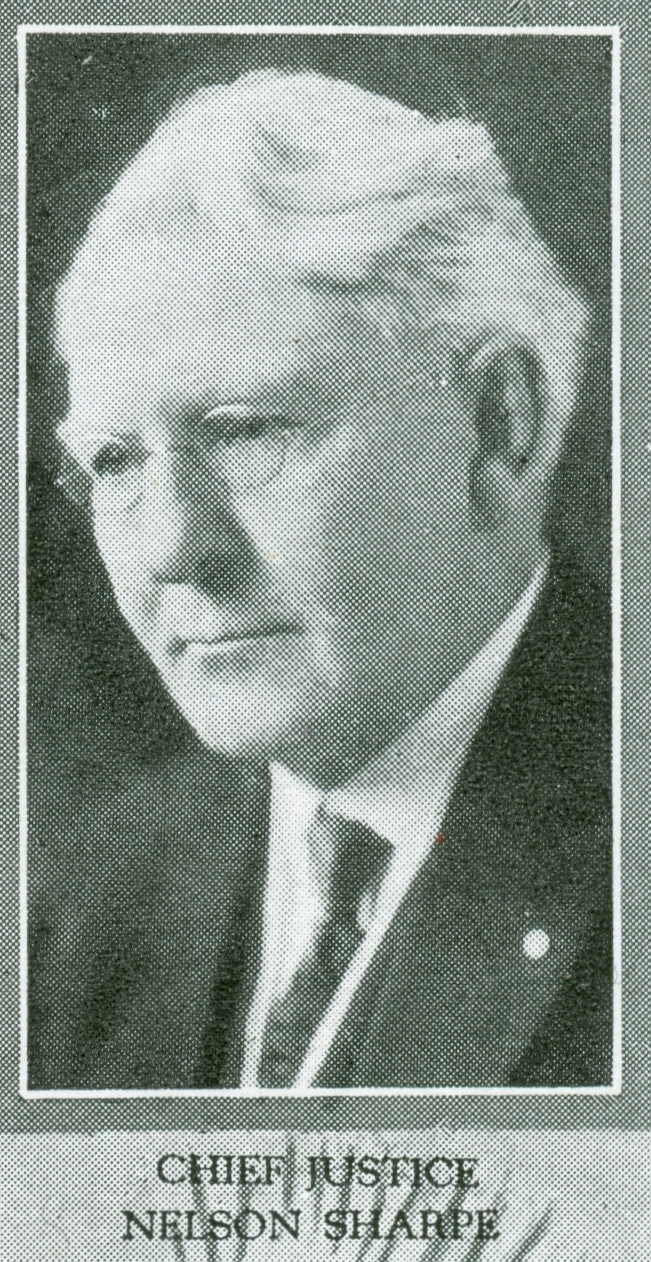
Chief Justice, Michigan Supreme Court, 1927

Nelson Sharpe (August 25, 1858 – October 20, 1935) was a justice of the Michigan Supreme Court from 1919 to 1935, serving as chief justice in 1927 and 1934.

He was appointed to the Supreme Court on September 25, 1919, by Governor Albert Sleeper to replace Russell C. Ostrander, who had died earlier in the month. He was then elected twice for two more eight year terms. He was succeeded by Harry S. Toy when he died mid term.

Before his 16 years of service to the Supreme Court, Sharpe had also severed on the bench for the 34th judicial circuit court (western Wayne County, Michigan) for 26 years. He was awarded a Doctor of Laws degree in 1934 by the University of Michigan.

He was born in Northumberland County, Ontario in 1858. He moved in 1885 to West Branch, Michigan, and became an American citizen three year later in 1888. He died October 20, 1935, at 77 from heart disease.

Political offices
Preceded by Russell C. Ostrander	Justice of the Michigan Supreme Court; 1919–1935	Succeeded by Harry S. Toy
