= Senator Wing =

Senator Wing may refer to:

- Merrick Wing (1833–1895), Wisconsin State Senate
- Warner Wing (1805–1876), Michigan State Senate
