= Rollin H. Person =

American judge

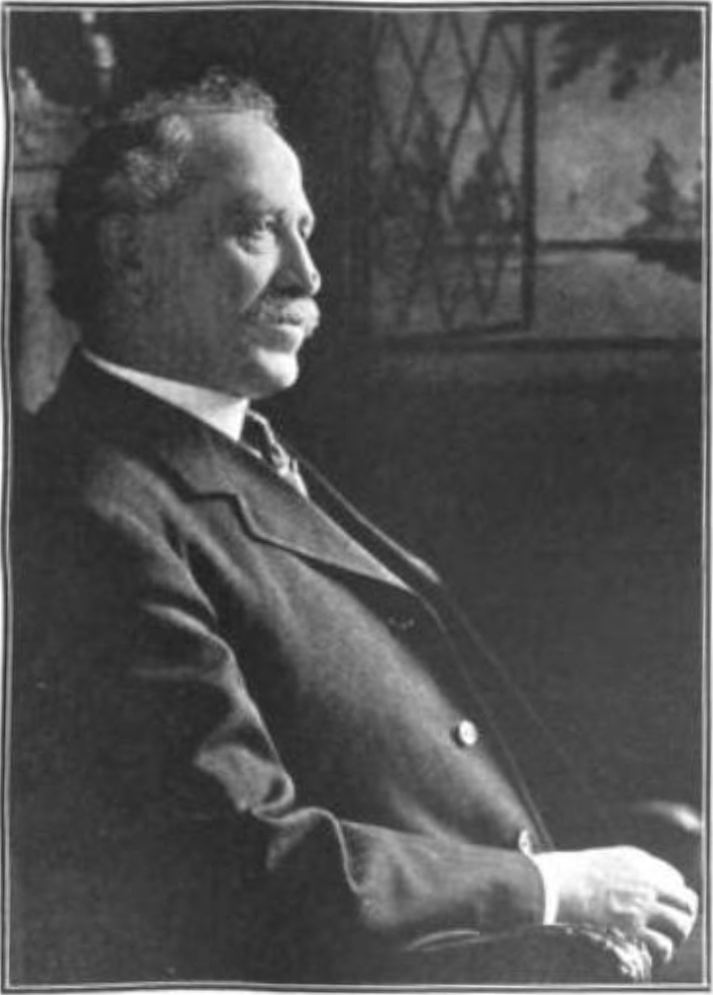
Rollin H. Person.

Rollin Harlow Person (October 15, 1850 – June 2, 1917) was an American jurist who served as an associate justice of the Michigan Supreme Court.

Born on a farm in Iosco Township, Michigan, Person went to high school in Howell, Michigan. He then studied law at University of Michigan Law School and was admitted to the Michigan bar in 1873. Person and his wife moved to Nebraska where he practiced law, but "[a] plague of grasshoppers which practically ruined that section of Nebraska in 1875 drove him back to Michigan", and he returned to Howell to practice law.

Person served as Michigan circuit court judge from 1891 to 1899. He advised Governor Woodbridge N. Ferris during the Copper Country strike of 1913–14, and impressed the governor enough that when Justice Aaron V. McAlvay died the following year, Ferris appointed Person to the vacant seat on the Michigan Supreme Court. Person served from 1915 to 1917, his term ending in January 1917 after he was defeated by Grant Fellows in a bid for reelection to the seat. Person died in Lansing, Michigan, at the age of 66, following an attack of indigestion.

Political offices
Preceded by Aaron V. McAlvay	Justice of the Michigan Supreme Court; 1915–1917	Succeeded by Grant Fellows
