= Clark J. Adams =

American lawyer, politician and judge

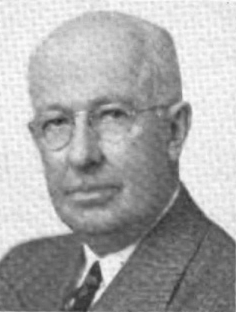

Justice of the Michigan Supreme Court
- In office November 1952 – April 1953

Personal details
- Born: Clark Jayno Adams; June 24, 1904 Silver Lake, Waterford Township, Michigan
- Died: September 26, 1981 (aged 77) Pontiac, Michigan
- Spouse: Adeline Adams

Clark Jayno Adams (June 24, 1904 – September 26, 1981) was an American lawyer, politician and judge. He was a justice of the Michigan Supreme Court in 1952 and 1953.

== Biography ==
Adams received his Bachelor of Arts from the University of Michigan and his law degree from the University of Michigan Law School. In June 1929, he married Adeline Adams.

Adams practiced law in Pontiac, Michigan, with C. Bryan Kinney. He was elected to the Michigan House of Representatives in 1936, 1938, and 1940. During was a legal advisor to Governor G. Mennen Williams. On August 26, 1952, Adams was appointed to the Michigan Supreme Court to fill the vacancy caused by the death of Justice Walter H. North.

Adams defeated two opponents in the November 1952 election for the Supreme Court, but was defeated in the April 1953 election by Justice John R. Dethmers and Justice Harry Kelly.

After his defeat, Governor G. Mennen Williams appointed Adams to the Oakland County Circuit Court, to fill a newly created seat.
