= General Marston =

General Marston may refer to:

- Gilman Marston (1811–1890), Union Army brigadier general
- John Marston (USMC) (1884–1957), U.S. Marine Corps major general

== See also ==
- Attorney General Marston (disambiguation)
