= Leland W. Carr =

American judge (1883–1969)

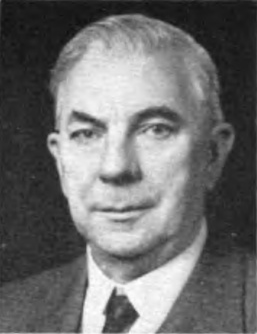
Leland W. Carr

Leland Walker Carr (September 29, 1883 – May 30, 1969) was an American jurist.

== Biography ==
Born on a farm in Livingston County, Michigan, Carr went to Michigan Normal State College in Ypsilanti, Michigan and then received his law degree, in 1906, from the University of Michigan Law School. Carr then taught school and was superintendent of public schools. Carr served as assistant district attorney and as an assistant attorney general. Carr served as Ingham County, Michigan circuit court judge. Carr then served as a Michigan Supreme Court justice from 1945 to 1963 and served as chief justice. Carr was appointed as the successor to Howard Wiest by Governor Harry F. Kelly in 1945. Carr died in Lansing, Michigan at his home.

He was the subject of a portrait executed in 1970 by Detroit artist Roy C. Gamble (1887 - 1972) which hangs at the Supreme Court. The portrait joins nine others by Gamble of Chief Justices. (Note: The other Chief Justices painted by Gamble are: Honorable George E. Bushnell, Hon. Henry M. Butzel, Hon. Leland Carr, Hon. Bert D. Chandler, Hon. George Clark, Hon. Louis H. Fead, Hon. William Potter, Hon. Raymond Starr and Hon. Harry Toy. Inexplicably, Howard Weist's portrait is not listed in the following source.)
