= Nathaniel Bacon (Michigan jurist) =

American judge of Michigan Supreme Court

The Honourable Nathaniel Bacon
- A picture of a portrait of Nathaniel Bacon commissioned for State of Michigan in 1901

Justice of Michigan Supreme Court
- In office 1855–1857
- Preceded by: Charles W. Whipple
- Succeeded by: Position eliminated

Judge, Circuit Court for the Second Circuit
- In office 1855-1863, 1867-1869

Personal details
- Born: July 14th 1802
- Died: September 9th 1869
- Education: Union College

Nathaniel Bacon (1802–1869) was a member of the Michigan Supreme Court from 1855 to 1857.

== Biography ==
Bacon was born at Ballston Spa, New York. He graduated from Union College in 1824. He was admitted to the bar in 1827 and in 1828 opened law offices in Rochester, New York. In 1833, he moved to Niles, Michigan. Bacon served as a prosecutor and a probate judge of Berrien County from 1833-1855. In 1851, Nathaniel Bacon ran for attorney general of Michigan on the Whig ticket but lost to William Hale.

In 1855, Bacon was appointed as judge of the Circuit Court of the Second Circuit by Governor Bingham to replace Charles W. Whipple, which also made him part of the Michigan Supreme Court. The court was reorganized in 1858. In 1857, elections were held for a new separate Supreme Court, but Bacon did not run. He continued serving as circuit judge until 1863, and then again from 1867 to 1869. He was still serving on the second circuit at the time of his death.

== Personal life ==
He was a member of the Whig Party and the Republican Party. He held antislavery views. He married Jane S. Sweetman in 1827 and had two sons with her. He married his second wife, Caroline S. Lord, in 1845.
