= Flavius L. Brooke =

American judge (1858–1921)

Chief Justice of the Michigan Supreme Court
- In office 1915
- Preceded by: Aaron V. McAlvay
- Succeeded by: John W. Stone

Justice of the Michigan Supreme Court
- In office 1908–1921

Personal details
- Born: October 1, 1858 Canada West, Province of Canada
- Died: January 21, 1921 (aged 62)
- Profession: Judge

Flavius L. Brooke (October 1, 1858 – January 21, 1921) was a member of the Michigan Supreme Court from 1908 to 1921.

Brooke was born in Canada West. He immigrated to Michigan in 1885 and then practiced law, in Detroit, Michigan. In 1901, he became a judge of the Wayne County, Michigan Circuit Court. Brooke served on the Michigan Supreme Court from 1915 until his death in 1921. He was the chief justice.

On his death, Howard Wiest was appointed by Governor Alex Groesbeck to fill the seat.
