= George Martin (Michigan judge) =

American judge (1815–1867)

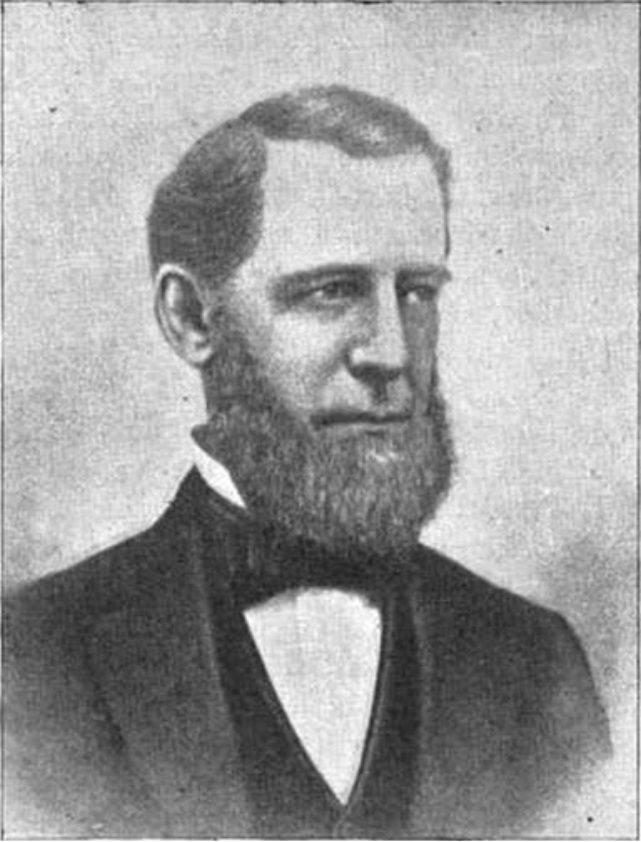
Michigan Supreme Court Justice George Martin.

George Martin (c. 1815–December 15, 1867) was a justice of the Michigan Supreme Court from 1851 until his death in 1867.

Born in Middlebury, Vermont, Martin was the son of a tavern-keeper and graduated from Middlebury College in 1833, and thereafter read law to gain admission to the bar in Vermont.

In 1836, he moved to Michigan, settling at Grand Rapids. He was a justice of the peace of the village of Grand Rapids, and was a prosecuting attorney for a time, but held no other important office until in 1851, at the age of thirty-six, he was made a circuit judge to succeed Edward Mundy. By virtue of his office of circuit judge he was also a member of the Supreme Court as it was then constituted, and he continued the duties of both courts until the organization to which he was elected in the spring of 1857. Martin continued for more than sixteen years to hold that post under the two following judicial systems. When the independent court was organized, he drew the chief-justiceship by lot, and afterwards was chosen to that post by his associates, and held it until his death, which took place sixteen days before the close of his term. By dint of his office, he was also an ex officio Regent of the University of Michigan. He was described as having "extra ordinary gifts, and with them the vices that were common to many of his predecessors and contemporaries, — intemperance and unthrift", and that he was "keen to detect in a record some technical defect that would enable him to get rid of the case without taking the trouble to study it". In one noted case, Twitchell v. Blodgett, he stated that he "could not allow to judicial doubts more potency than to legislative certainty". In the last three years before his death, Martin "was so unfit to work that he filed but few opinions".

Political offices
Preceded by Edward Mundy	Justice of the Michigan Supreme Court; 1851–1867	Succeeded by Benjamin F. Graves
