= Michael D. O'Hara =

American judge

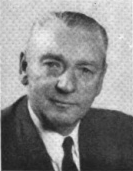
Michael D. O'Hara

Michael Doyle O'Hara (September 19, 1910 – July 16, 1978) was an American jurist.

Born in Menominee, Michigan, O'Hara went to University of Notre Dame and graduated from St. Norbert College. He then taught at St. Norbert College. O'Hara studied law under Leland Carr who later served as chief justice of the Michigan Supreme Court and then was admitted to the Michigan bar in 1935. O'Hara then practiced law in Menominee, Michigan. During World War II, O'Hara served in the United States Marine Corps. From 1963 to 1969, O'Hara served on the Michigan Supreme Court. He then served on the Michigan Court of Appeals until 1975 when he retired. O'Hara died in a drowning accident, apparently from a heart attack, in Menominee, Michigan.
