= John R. Dethmers =

American judge

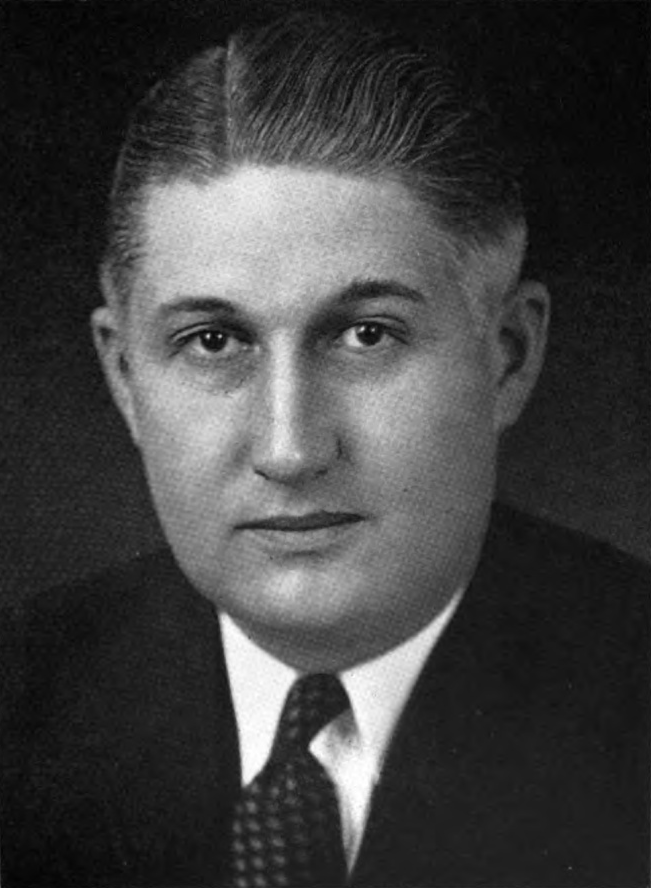

46th, 50th, and 53rd Chief Justice of the Michigan Supreme Court
- In office 1967–1969
- Preceded by: Thomas M. Kavanagh
- Succeeded by: Thomas E. Brennan
- In office 1956–1962
- Preceded by: Edward Sharpe
- Succeeded by: Leland W. Carr
- In office 1953–1953
- Preceded by: Clark Adams
- Succeeded by: Henry Butzel

69th Justice of the Michigan Supreme Court
- In office 1946–1970
- Appointed by: Harry F. Kelly
- Preceded by: Raymond Starr
- Succeeded by: Swainson/Williams

43rd Michigan Attorney General
- In office 1945 – August 15, 1946
- Governor: Harry Kelly
- Preceded by: Herbert J. Rushton
- Succeeded by: Foss O. Eldred

Chairman of the Michigan Republican Party
- In office 1942–1945

Ottawa County Prosecuting Attorney
- In office 1931–1938

Personal details
- Born: October 15, 1903 Plessis, Iowa
- Died: November 1, 1971 (aged 68) Lansing, Michigan

John R. Dethmers (October 15, 1903 – November 1, 1971) was a politician from the U.S. state of Michigan.

Dethmers was born in Plessis in O'Brien County, Iowa. He resided in Orange City, Iowa, Holland, Michigan, and East Lansing, Michigan. He enrolled at Hope College in Holland, Michigan, then went on to the University of Michigan Law School and began to practice law in 1927. Dethmers was a member of various judicial associations and was a family man with three children. He was Ottawa County Prosecuting Attorney from 1931 to 1938. He was a member of the Michigan Republican State Central Committee in 1939. Dethmers served as Chairman of the Michigan Republican Party from 1942 to 1945 and was a delegate to the 1944 Republican National Convention. He served as Michigan Attorney General from 1945 to 1946. Governor Harry Kelly appointed Dethmers Justice of the Michigan Supreme Court, serving from 1946 to 1970 and serving as Chief Justice of the Michigan State Supreme Court in 1953, 1956–1962, and 1967–1969. He was defeated in 1970. He was a Presbyterian and a member of the American Judicature Society. John R. Dethmers died in Lansing.

Party political offices
Preceded by Leslie B. Butler	Chairman of the Michigan Republican Party; 1942– 1945	Succeeded by John A. Wagner
Legal offices
Preceded by Herbert J. Rushton	Michigan Attorney General; 1945– 1946	Succeeded by Foss O. Eldred
