= Sanford M. Green =

American judge

Sanford Moon Green (May 30, 1807 – August 13, 1901) was an American politician, lawyer, and jurist.

Born in Grafton, New York, Green studied law and was admitted to the New York bar. In 1837, Green moved to Owosso, Michigan and continue to practice law. From 1843 to 1847, Green served in the Michigan State Senate and was a Democrat. While in the Michigan Senate, Green helped revised the Michigan state statures. Green then served on the Michigan Supreme Court from 1848 to 1857 and was the chief justice. From 1858 to 1867, Green served as a Michigan Circuit Court judge. In 1867, Green retired and moved to Bay City, Michigan. Again, Green served as a circuit court judge from 1872 to 1888. Green died in Bay City, Michigan.
