= George M. Clark =

American judge (1875–1951)

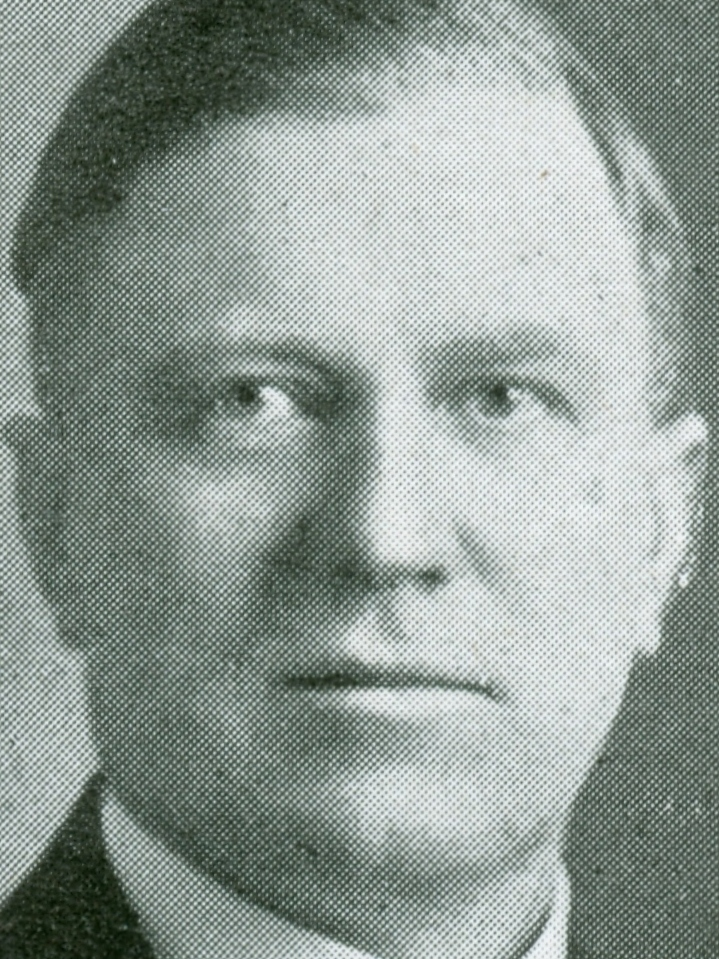
Clark circa 1927

George M. Clark (November 21, 1875 – March 28, 1951) was an American jurist.

From Bad Axe, Michigan, Clark taught school in Huron County, Michigan and served as county clerk. He studied law and was admitted to the Michigan bar in 1905. Clark served on the Michigan Supreme Court from 1919 to 1933 and was chief justice in 1924 and 1932. In 1933, he was defeated for reelection by George E. Bushnell. He farmed in Caseville, Michigan, and practiced law in Detroit, Michigan and Muskegon, Michigan.
