= George Morell (Michigan judge) =

American judge (1786–1845)

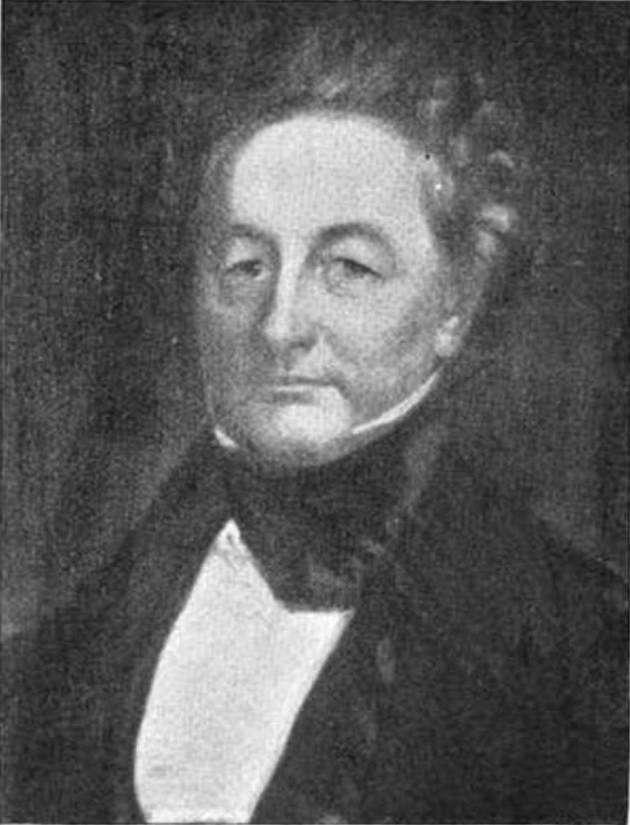
Michigan Supreme Court Justice George Morell.

George Morell (March 22, 1786 – March 8, 1845) was an American lawyer and jurist.

Born in Lenox, Massachusetts, Morell graduated from Williams College in 1807. He then studied law in Troy, New York and was admitted to the New York Bar. Morell lived in Cooperstown, New York from 1811 to 1832 where he practiced law. Morell served as a judge on the New York Court of Common Pleas and as a master in chancery in Otsego County, New York. He also served in the New York Militia. He was a member of the New York State Assembly (Otsego Co.) in 1829. In 1832, President Andrew Jackson appointed Morell to the Michigan Territorial Supreme Court. Governor Stevens T. Mason appointed Morell to the Michigan Supreme Court in 1836. He served on the Michigan Supreme Court until 1843 and was the chief justice of the Michigan Supreme Court from 1842 to 1843. Morell died in Detroit, Michigan. His son was George W. Morell, United States Army officer.
