= Frank A. Hooker =

American jurist (1844–1911)

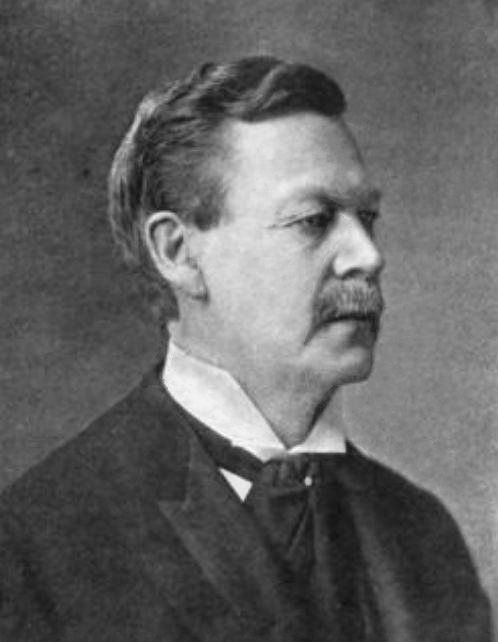
Frank A. Hooker

Frank A. Hooker (January 16, 1844 – July 10, 1911) was an American jurist.

Born in Hartford, Connecticut, Hooker was trained to be a stonemason. He then studied at University of Michigan Law School and graduated in 1865. He practiced law in Bryan, Ohio and eventually settled in Charlotte, Michigan where he continued to practice law. Hooker served as superintendent of schools and as county attorney for Eaton County, Michigan. In 1878, Hooker was appointed a Michigan district court judge. Hooker served on the Michigan Supreme Court from 1893 until his death in 1911. Hooker was chief justice in 1893, 1902, and 1903. Hooker died suddenly of heart failure while at the New York Central Station in Auburn, New York. Hooker was on an automobile tour at the time of his death.
