= Neil E. Reid =

American judge (1871–1956)

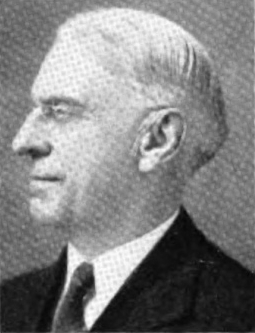
Neil E. Reid

Neil E. Reid (April 24, 1871 – May 4, 1956) was an American jurist.

Born in Bruce Township, Macomb County, Michigan, Reid went to high school in Almont, Michigan and Romeo, Michigan. He then studied for a year at Harvard University and received his law degree from Detroit College of Law in 1896. Reid served as probate judge and was a Republican. Reid served on the Michigan Supreme Court from 1944 until his death in 1956 and was chief justice in 1951. Reid died in a hospital in Mount Clemens, Michigan.
