= Benjamin F. Graves (judge) =

American judge (1817–1906)

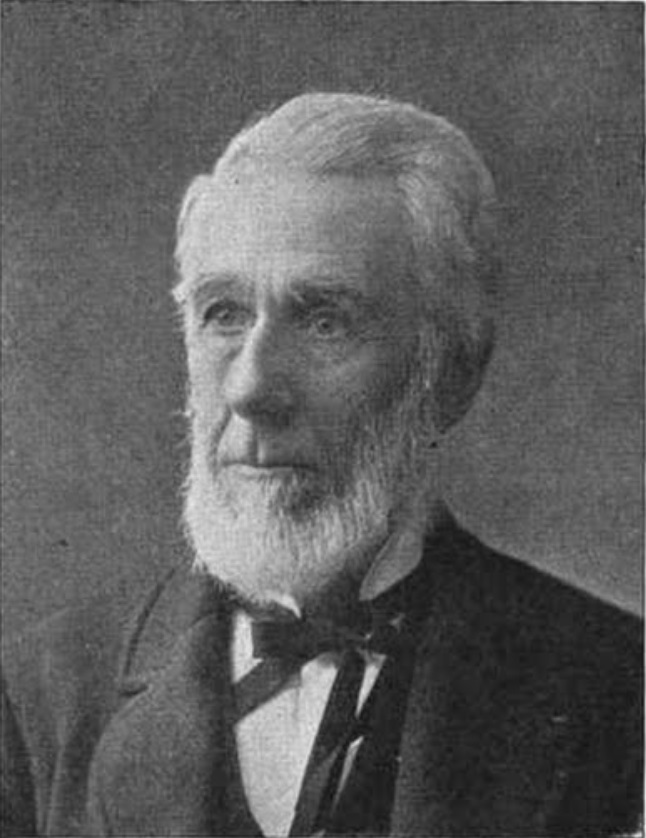
Michigan Supreme Court Justice Benjamin Franklin Graves.

Benjamin Franklin Graves (October 17, 1817 – March 3, 1906) was a justice of the Michigan Supreme Court from 1868 to 1883.

Born at Gates, New York, near Rochester, Graves was of New England ancestry. His parents wanted him to become a farmer, but he preferred an academic life, and began the study of law. Graves read law in the office of Curtis & Thomas, in Albion, New York, and then in the office of Mortimer F. Delano, a lawyer of wide practice. He was admitted to the bar of New York in 1841. Among the friends and associates of his student days was Sanford E. Church, afterwards Chief Justice of the Court of Appeals of New York.

In 1843 he decided to emigrate to the west. He moved to Kentucky, but was not satisfied there, and moved to Battle Creek, Michigan, and began the practice of law. Battle Creek was then a small village, and the country around only sparsely settled. With little business to be transacted, Graves "lived the life of a country lawyer", with a practice "necessarily limited to small affairs and the details of office work". At Battle Creek he was elected civil magistrate, and appointed master in chancery.

In 1857, Graves was elected judge of the Fifth Circuit, and then reelected without opposition. The work was arduous and laborious, with sixteen terms being held each year, in several counties, to each of which he traveled. As a circuit judge, Graves succeeded Judge Pratt as one of the judges of the Michigan Supreme Court, which was, at the time made up of circuit judges. Sessions of the court were held at Detroit, Kalamazoo, Adrian, Pontiac, and Lansing. Circuit judges were then paid fifteen hundred dollars per year plus traveling expenses. At the end of 1857, Michigan restructured its judiciary so that the Supreme Court was separately elected, and Graves continued serving as a circuit judge until he resigned due to poor health, in 1866. In 1867 Graves accepted a nomination to the Supreme Court and was elected, taking his seat on January 1, 1868. In 1875, he was renominated "by both the republican and democratic State conventions and was unanimously elected".

Graves declined renomination in 1883, returning to private life on January 1, 1884. Then sixty-six years old, he reasoned that "the weakness of age might unconsciously come upon him and impair his ability to discharge the duties of the position". He lived over twenty-two years thereafter, maintaining his mental acuity, living in Battle Creek until 1894, and then moving to Detroit.

His granddaughter, Betsy Graves Reyneau, was a distinguished painter; although discouraged by her father from entering that profession on the grounds that it was inappropriate for a woman, she broke ties with the family to pursue her career. She was later selected by the Circuit Court of Detroit, unbeknownst to her family, to paint a portrait of Graves.

Political offices
Preceded by George Martin	Justice of the Michigan Supreme Court; 1868–1883	Succeeded by John W. Champlin
