= Emerson R. Boyles =

American judge

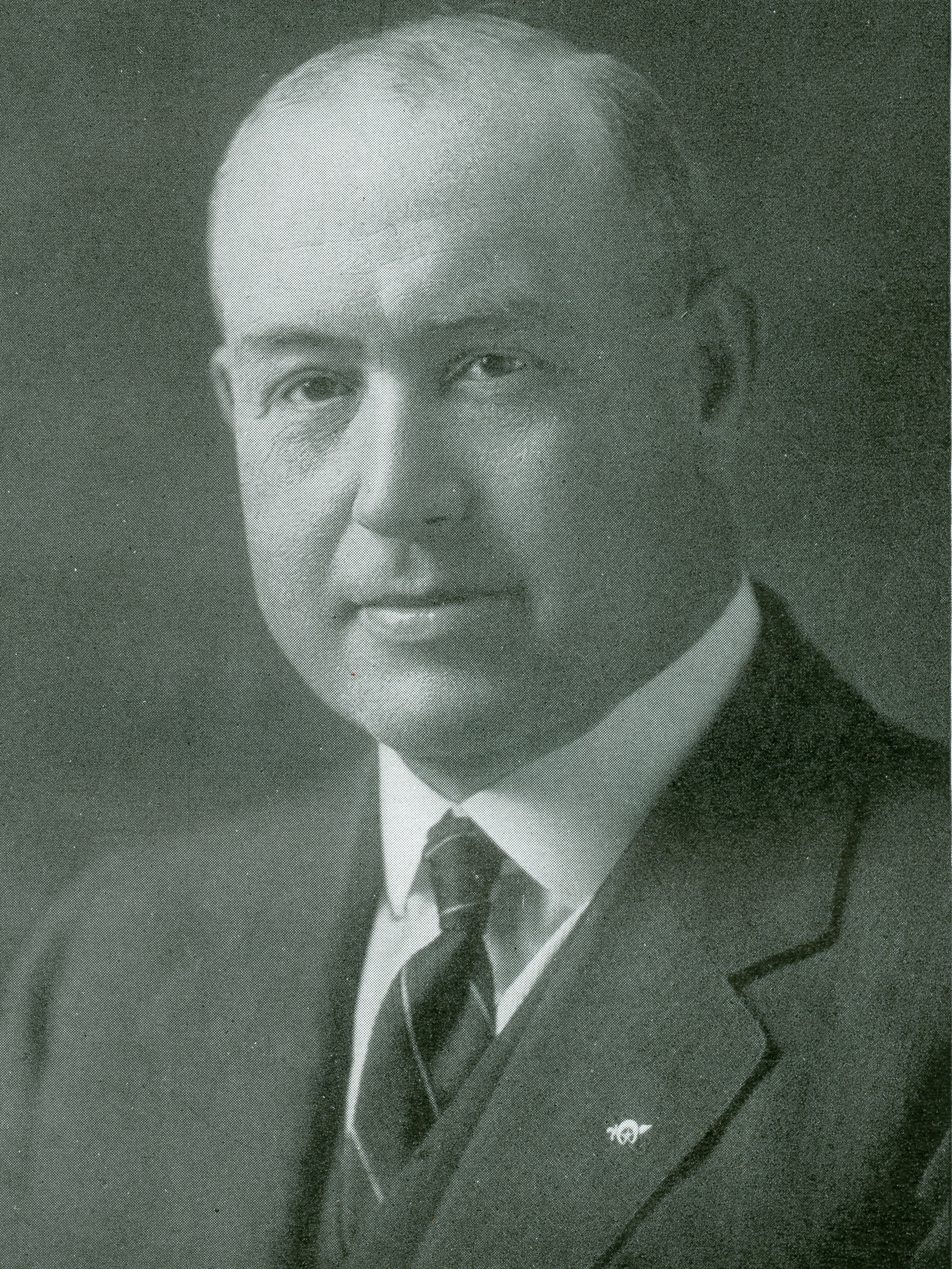
Boyles circa 1927

Emerson R. Boyles (June 29, 1881 – November 30, 1960) was an American lawyer and judge. He served as a justice of the Michigan Supreme Court from 1940 until 1956.

== Early life and education ==
Boyles was born in Chester Township, Michigan, on June 29, 1881. He attended rural district schools and graduated from Charlotte High School in Charlotte, Michigan as valedictorian. Boyles earned his law degree from the University of Michigan Law School in 1903 and was admitted to the bar when he was twenty-one years old.

== Career ==
Boyles began practicing law in Charlotte. He was elected Eaton County prosecuting attorney, serving from 1912 to 1916. From 1921 until 1927, Boyles was a probate judge for Eaton County.

In 1927, Boyles resigned as probate judge to become deputy attorney general under Michigan Attorney General William W. Potter. Boyles remained in that position until 1933, serving under three attorneys general. In 1935, Governor Frank Fitzgerald, appointed Boyles to serve on the Michigan Public Utilities Commission. In 1936, Boyles became the legal advisor to Fitzgerald, and later to Governor Luren Dickinson.

On November 5, 1940, Boyles was elected a justice of the Michigan Supreme Court to fill the vacancy of William W. Potter. Boyles was re-elected in 1943 and 1950 and remained on the court until 1956.

Boyles was the author of the Michigan Criminal Index, Probate Blanks, and Probate Manual, and was a supervisor of Compiled Laws of 1929.

Boyles married Mabel Casler in 1905. He had one daughter, Mary Frances Crouse, and three grandchildren, Edward Boyles Crouse, John Emerson Crouse, and Henry Bernard Crouse. Boyles died on November 30, 1960.
