= Joseph B. Moore (Michigan judge) =

American judge (1845–1930)

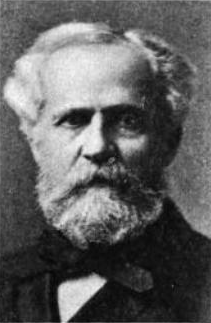
- Joseph B. Moore

Mayor of Lapeer, Michigan
- In office 1874 – 1875
- Governor: John J. Bagley
- Preceded by: Myron C. Kenney
- Succeeded by: Charles M. Hemingway

Member of the Michigan Senate from the 20th district
- In office 1878 – 1880
- Governor: Charles Croswell
- Preceded by: William Jenney
- Succeeded by: John T. Rich

Sixth Circuit Court of Michigan
- In office 1888 – 1895

Michigan Supreme Court
- In office 1896 – 1925
- Appointed by: Benjamin Harrison
- Preceded by: John W. McGrath

Chief Justice of the Michigan Supreme Court
- In office 1904–1905, 1912

Personal details
- Born: November 3, 1845 Commerce, Michigan
- Died: March 23, 1930 (aged 84) Detroit, Michigan
- Resting place: Mount Hope Cemetery
- Party: Republican
- Spouse: Etta L. Bently (m. 1872)
- Parents: Jacob J. Moore (father); Hebsibeth (Gillett) Moore (mother)
- Education: University of Michigan
- Occupation: Lawyer, politician, and jurist

Joseph B. Moore (November 3, 1845 – March 23, 1930) was a lawyer, politician, and jurist from the U.S. state of Michigan.

== Early life ==
Moore was born in Commerce, Michigan the fifth child of eight to Jacob J. and Hebsibeth (Gillett) Moore. His father was a native of Warren County, New Jersey and his mother was born in Monroe County, New York. The Moore family came to Michigan in 1833 and the Gillett family in 1834. Both families settled in Macomb County and Jacob and Hebsibeth were married on January 1, 1837. In 1838, Jacob moved to Dryden in Lapeer County for six years before moving to Commerce, where he established himself a furniture manufacturer. In 1858, he moved to the village of Walled Lake in Oakland County, where he operated a sawmill. In 1860, he purchased a farm and moved there while continuing to run the sawmill. While Joseph was working at the sawmill, he read a copy of Blackstone's Commentaries lent to him by James D. Bateman, a local harnessmaker who had taught himself the law and made a second career for himself. Moore attributed his own interest in the legal profession to this influence.

== Civil War ==
In 1864, at the age of 19, he and a brother drew lots for the opportunity to enlist in the 30th Michigan Infantry to fight in the Civil War alongside an older brother. The lot fell to Joseph, but he was rejected by the examining surgeon in Detroit. The next day, the other brother enlisted in the 22nd Regiment, Michigan Volunteer Infantry, was accepted and served until the end of the war.

== Political career ==
In 1865, Moore entered Hillsdale College and alternately attended fall and spring terms while also teaching at local schools during the winter term and working at his father's businesses during the summers. While he did not complete his course of study, the college conferred upon him the degree of Master of Arts in 1879. In 1868, he entered the law department of the University of Michigan at Ann Arbor for one year. After which, he went to Lapeer and applied to practice law in the court of Judge Josiah Turner. He was admitted to the bar in October 1869 and quickly developed great skill as a trial lawyer.

Moore was elected Circuit Court Commissioner for Lapeer County for two years, and was then elected Prosecuting Attorney of the county. In the spring of 1874, he became Mayor of Lapeer, while continuing to execute his office as Prosecuting Attorney. In 1876, he was unanimously selected by the Republican Party to be the candidate for State Senator, but he declined. He agreed to run in 1878, and was elected to represent the 20th District in the Michigan State Senate. He declined renomination in 1880, and returned to the practice of law. In 1887, he became president of the Board of Water Commissioners in Lapeer.

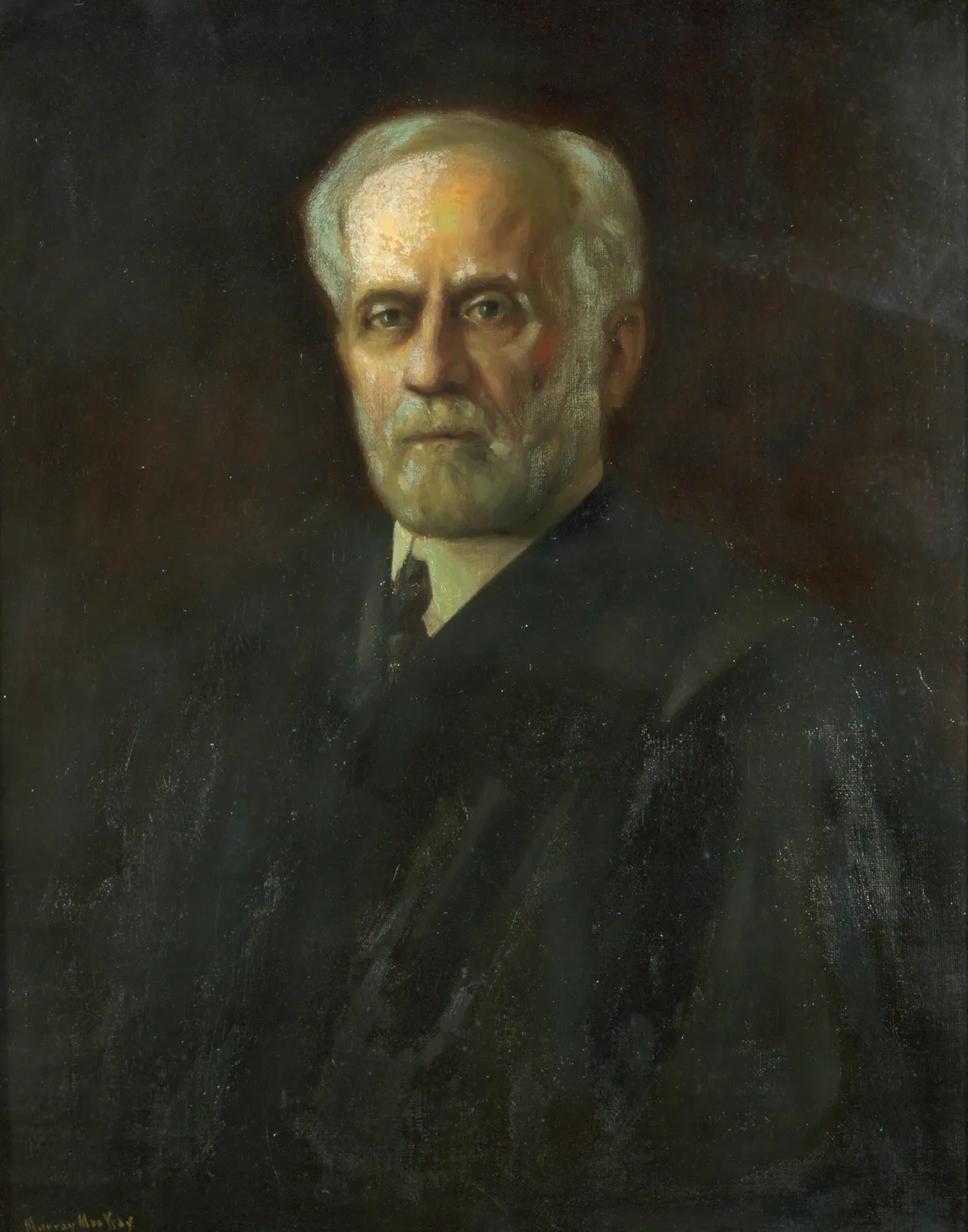
Michigan Supreme Court portrait by Edwin Murray MacKay, 1920

In the spring of 1888, Moore was elected Circuit Court Judge of the Sixth Circuit, where he served for the next eight years. In 1891, he was appointed by U.S. President Benjamin Harrison as part of a commission to select lands for permanent reservations for the Mission Indians in Southern California. In 1895, he was elected to the Michigan Supreme Court, commencing his office on January 1, 1896. He served on the court for the next 30 years, and was chief justice from 1904 to 1905, in 1912, and in 1920. He resigned in December 1925 at the age of 80.

Moore married Etta L. Bently on December 3, 1872, but the couple had no children.
