= James I. Christiancy =

American soldier (c. 1844-1899)

- Born: c. 1844
- Died: December 18, 1899
- Military career
- Allegiance: United States of America
- Branch: United States Army
- Rank: First Lieutenant
- Unit: 9th Regiment Michigan Volunteer Cavalry - Company D
- Awards: Medal of Honor

First Lieutenant James Isaac Christiancy (c. 1844 to December 18, 1899) was an American soldier who fought in the American Civil War. Christiancy received the country's highest award for bravery during combat, the Medal of Honor, for his action at Hawes Shops, Virginia on 28 May 1864. He was honored with the award on 10 October 1892.

== Biography ==
Christiancy was born in Monroe County, Michigan in 1844. He enlisted into the 9th Michigan Cavalry. He died on 18 December 1899 and his remains are interred at the Arlington National Cemetery in Virginia.

== Medal of Honor citation ==
While acting as aide, voluntarily led a part of the line into the fight, and was twice wounded.

== See also ==
- List of American Civil War Medal of Honor recipients: A–F
