= Charles W. Whipple =

American judge

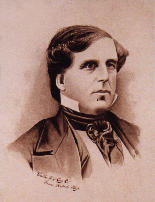

2nd Speaker of the Michigan House of Representatives
- In office January 2, 1837 – December 30, 1837
- Preceded by: Ezra Convis
- Succeeded by: Kinsley S. Bingham

Member of the Michigan House of Representatives from the Wayne County district
- In office 1833–1838

Chief Justice of the Michigan Supreme Court
- In office 1848–1852
- Preceded by: Epaphroditus Ransom
- Succeeded by: Warner Wing

Justice of the Michigan Supreme Court
- In office 1839–1855

Personal details
- Born: 1805 Fort Wayne, Indiana
- Died: January 1856 (aged 50–51)
- Party: Democratic
- Spouse: Margaret
- Children: Two
- Education: West Point
- Occupation: Attorney

Charles W. Whipple (1805 – January 1856) was an American attorney, politician who served as Speaker of the Michigan House of Representatives, and chief justice of the Michigan Supreme Court. He was the secretary of the Michigan constitutional convention of 1835 and a delegate to the convention of 1850. Further, Whipple served as secretary of the second session of the Sixth Legislative Council.

== Personal life ==
Whipple was born in Fort Wayne, Indiana. His father, Major John Whipple, was an officer during the War of 1812 and served under Mad Anthony Wayne.
