= Walter H. North =

American politician (1933–2014)

Member of the Michigan Senate from the 37th district
- In office January 1, 1995 – December 31, 2002
- Preceded by: George A. McManus Jr.
- Succeeded by: Jason Allen

Personal details
- Born: January 31, 1933 Kirksville, Missouri
- Died: October 31, 2014 (aged 81) St. Ignace, Michigan
- Resting place: Lakeside Cemetery, St. Ignace
- Party: Republican
- Spouse: Sally
- Relations: Walter Harper North (grandfather):
- Education: Western Michigan University
- Profession: Accounting

Military service
- Allegiance: United States of America
- Branch/service: United States Air Force
- Years of service: 1952-1954
- Rank: Staff sergeant
- Battles/wars: Korea

Walter H. North (January 31, 1933 – October 31, 2014) was a Republican member of the Michigan Senate from 1995 through 2002. He was also an assistant to Michigan State Treasurer Allison Green, and comptroller and executive director of the Mackinac Bridge Authority.

North was born in Missouri to Robert and Mary North on January 31, 1933. Raised in Battle Creek, North was a standout student and star basketball player in high school. He received a scholarship to Western Michigan University, but a hand injury prevented him from playing in college. After three years in the Air Force, North returned to WMU and was awarded a business degree. He married Sally, his high school sweetheart, in 1953.

He made an unsuccessful run for the Michigan House of Representatives in 1964. North then became an assistant to the state treasurer and, in 1966, was appointed comptroller of the Mackinac Bridge Authority. He was named the authority's executive secretary in 1982, a role he held until 1993. While involved with the authority, North helped grow the annual Labor Day Bridge Walk.

North was elected to the Michigan Senate in 1994, representing the 37th district for two terms. An advocate for those less fortunate, his accomplishments include new medical clinics on Mackinac and Beaver islands, a new Michigan State Police post in St. Ignace, and various projects for the Sault Tribe of Chippewa Indians.

North's grandfather, Walter Harper North, was a circuit court judge in Calhoun County for 22 years and a justice of the Michigan Supreme Court for 25 years, including four (1929, 1936, 1944, 1952) as chief justice.
