= Claudius B. Grant =

American judge (1835–1921)

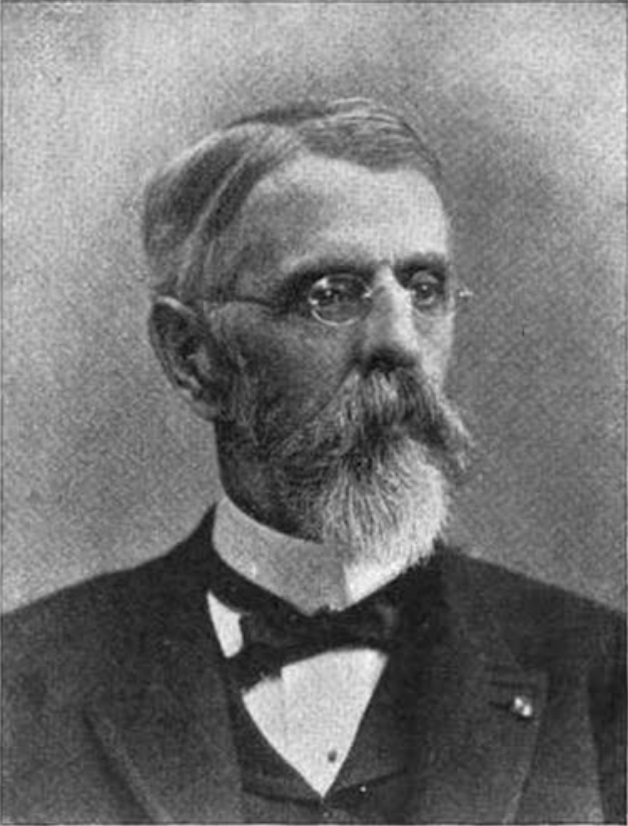
Claudius B. Grant

Claudius Buchanan Grant (October 25, 1835 – February 28, 1921) was an American jurist, legislator, and lawyer.

== Early life and education ==
Grant was born in Lebanon, Maine, on October 25, 1835, to Joseph Grant and Mary Merrill. He attended the University of Michigan from 1855 to 1859 and graduated with a Bachelor of Arts degree. He taught at Ann Arbor High School for three years, serving as principal the last two.

== Career ==
He served in the Union Army, in the 20th Michigan Infantry Regiment, rising to colonel during the American Civil War. He married Caroline Felch, daughter of the former governor of Michigan, Alpheus Felch, in 1863. He was admitted to the bar in 1866 and began practicing law with his father-in-law.

He was postmaster of Ann Arbor from 1867 to 1870, served in the Michigan House of Representatives from 1871 to 1875, and was elected to the Board of Regents of the University of Michigan from 1872 until 1880.

Grant moved to Houghton, Michigan in 1873 and continued to practice law. He served as a Michigan circuit court judge from 1881 to 1889. From 1889 to 1909, Grant served on the Michigan Supreme Court and was chief justice. Grant died in St. Petersburg, Florida.
