= William L. Carpenter (Michigan judge) =

American judge (1854–1936)

William Leland Carpenter (November 9, 1854 –1936) was a member of the Michigan Supreme Court from 1902 until 1904. Carpenter was born in Lake Orion, Michigan. He studied at what is now Michigan State University and then went to the University of Michigan Law School.

From 1878 to 1894 Carpenter practiced law in Detroit. In the latter year he was elected to the Third Judicial Circuit of Michigan.

== Sources ==
- biography of William Carpenter
