= Aaron V. McAlvay =

American judge (1847–1915)

Aaron Vance McAlvay (July 19, 1847 – July 9, 1915) was a justice on the Michigan Supreme Court from January 1, 1905, to July 9, 1915.

Born in Ann Arbor, Michigan, McAlvay's father was a Michigan farmer, and the son spent most of his early life, when not in school, on the farm. He received his primary education in the common schools of Michigan, and received an A.B. from the literary department of the University of Michigan in 1868, followed by an LL.B. from that institution in 1869.

He moved to Manistee, Michigan, in October 1871, and immediately entered the practice of the law with Colonel S. W. Fowler. After the dissolution of that firm, McAlvay opened an office in Manistee and practiced alone until 1886, when he formed a partnership with the late John H. Grant, the firm name being McAlvay & Grant. This firm continued until McAlvay was appointed to a seat on the circuit court vacated by the death of Judge Harrison H. Wheeler. McAlvay was again appointed to the circuit court in 1901, to a seat vacated by the death of Judge Beardsley, serving until elected to the Michigan Supreme Court in November 1904. He took office on January 1, 1905, and first served as an associate justice, and then was made chief justice in 1907. He served as chief justice for one year because returning to service an associate justice, and then in 1914, McAlvay served another year as chief justice. In 1910, he received an honorary LL. D. from the University of Michigan Law School.

Soon after he became a member of the Supreme Court, McAlvay moved to Lansing, where he lived with his family until his sudden death in 1915. His wife, also a Michigan native, and five of his six children survived him.

Political offices
Preceded by Newly established seat.	Justice of the Michigan Supreme Court; 1905–1915	Succeeded by Rollin H. Person
