= Thomas R. Sherwood =

American judge

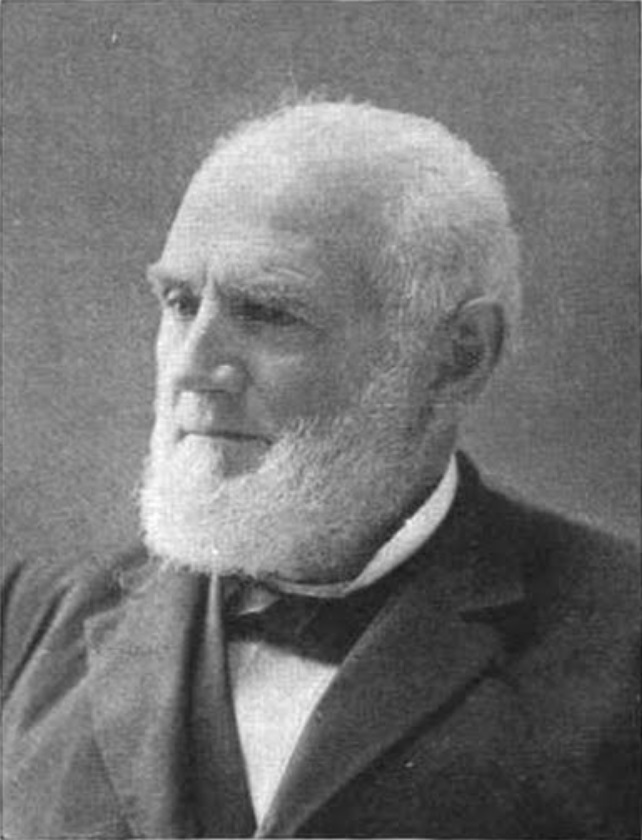
Michigan Supreme Court Justice Thomas Russell Sherwood.

Thomas Russell Sherwood (March 28, 1827 – March 28, 1896) was an American jurist.

Born in Pleasant Valley, New York, Sherwood was admitted to the New York bar in 1851 and practiced law briefly in Port Jervis, New York. In 1852, Sherwood moved to Kalamazoo, Michigan and continued to practice law. He served as the Kalamazoo city attorney. Sherwood was elected to the Michigan Supreme Court in 1882 on the Greenback Party ticket and served from 1883 to 1889. Sherwood also served as the chief justice from 1886 to 1889. He died in Chicago, Illinois.
