= James V. Campbell =

American judge (1823–1890)

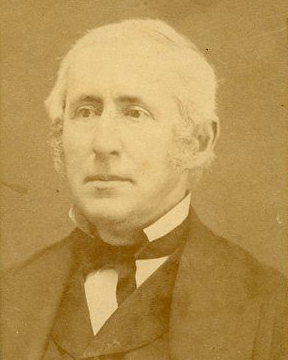

Justice of the Michigan Supreme Court
- In office January 1, 1858 – March 26, 1890
- Preceded by: Benjamin F. Graves
- Succeeded by: Edward Cahill

1st Dean of University of Michigan Law School
- In office 1859–1871
- Preceded by: Office established
- Succeeded by: Thomas M. Cooley

Personal details
- Born: James Valentine Campbell; February 25, 1823 Buffalo, New York, U.S.
- Died: March 26, 1890 (aged 67) Detroit, Michigan, U.S.
- Spouse: Cornelia Hotchkiss
- Education: University of Michigan

James Valentine Campbell (February 25, 1823 – March 26, 1890) was a member of the Michigan Supreme Court from 1858 to 1890.

Campbell was born in Buffalo, New York but was brought to Detroit at a very young age. Campbell served as a law professor at the University of Michigan for much of the time he was on the Michigan Supreme Court. One biography of Campbell summed his life up as follows:

His father, Henry Munroe Campbell, had been a county judge in New York, and held the same position afterwards in Michigan. The son was graduated in 1841 from the now extinct St. Paul's College at Flushing, L. I., when Dr. Muhlenberg was president of it. At twenty-one he was admitted to the bar, and practised in partnership with Walker and Douglass, the chancery and law re porters heretofore mentioned. But Camp bell has the credit of having done much of the work on Walker's Chancery Report. He was at various times in the Detroit Board of Education, and in 1848 was president of the Young Men's Society when that organization, with its library, was the chief engine of culture in Detroit. Thirty-five years later he was president of the Public Library Commission. He was intimately connected with the government of the University of Michigan, in earlier years, as secretary of its faculty; and when the law school was opened through his exertions in 1858, he became Marshall professor of law, and continued to hold that post for twenty-five years That same year he began his judicial career, which never closed until the morning of March 26, 1890, when, while sitting in his library awaiting breakfast, the great change came so silently and suddenly upon him that those who were with him in the same room did not at first perceive it.

== Sources ==
- bio of Campbell
