= Richard C. Flannigan =

American judge

Richard C. Flannigan (December 15, 1859 – February 17, 1928) was an American lawyer and judge.

== Life and career ==
Born in Ontonagon, Michigan, Flannigan and his family moved to Marquette, Michigan. Flannigan worked at the ore docks and as a checking clerk and bellboy at the Marquette, Houghton and Ontonagon Railroad. He studied law at the University of Michigan Law School graduated in 1879, and then was admitted to the Michigan bar. He practiced law and worked with the mining industry and the railroads as a lawyer. Flannigan moved to Norway, Michigan in 1880. He served as district attorney of Menominee County, Michigan and then in 1891, served as mayor of Norway, Michigan. Flannigan served as a delegate to the Michigan Constitutional Convention of 1909. Flannigan was a Democrat and then quit the party because of its stand on free silver. In 1928, Flannigan served on the Michigan Supreme Court and was chief justice. Flannigan died in a hospital, in Chicago, Illinois, of pleurisy.
