= John W. McGrath =

American judge

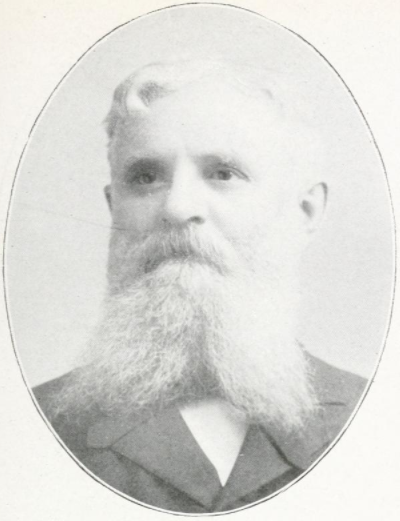
John W. McGrath

John Wesley McGrath (January 12, 1842 – December 9, 1905) was an American educator, businessman and jurist during the nineteenth and early twentieth centuries.

== Formative years ==
Born in Philadelphia, Pennsylvania on January 12, 1842, McGrath attended Albion College. In 1868, he completed his legal studies at the University of Michigan Law School.

== Public service and business career ==
McGrath taught school, worked for the provost marshal and was employed in the commercial oil business in Pennsylvania. Following his graduation from the University of Michigan, he practiced law in Ann Arbor, Michigan. A member of the Republican, he served on the Detroit Board of Education and as the city counselor of the city of Detroit. The first commissioner of the Michigan Labor Bureau, McGrath was also a member of the Michigan Supreme Court, serving in that capacity as a Democrat from 1891 to 1895, and was the chief justice.

== Illness and death ==
Ailing in his final years, McGrath died from dropsy at his home in Detroit, Michigan on December 10, 1905. Following funeral services at the home of his daughter, Mrs. R. Arthur Bailey, on December 11, he was buried at the Woodlawn Cemetery.
