= Joseph H. Steere =

American judge

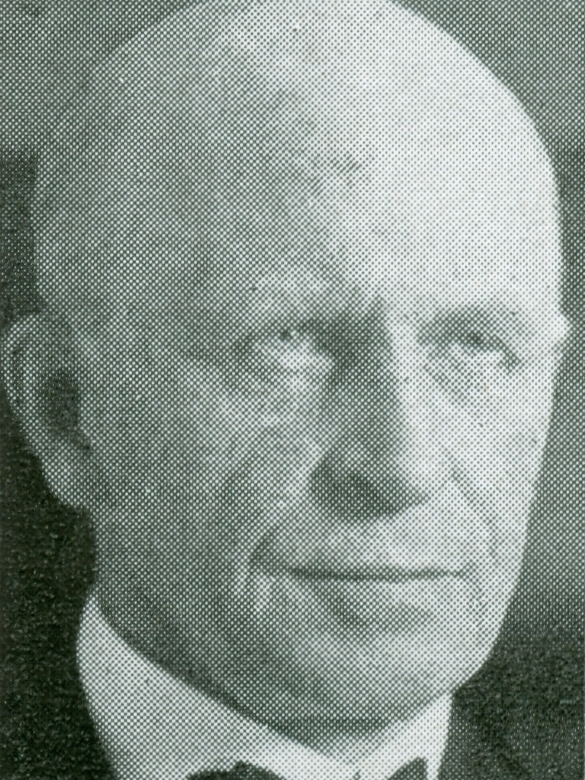
Steere circa 1927

Joseph H. Steere (May 16, 1852 – December 16, 1936) was an American jurist.

Born in Addison, Michigan, Steere graduated from University of Michigan in 1876. He then studied law, went to University of Michigan Law School for law lectures, and was admitted to the Michigan bar in 1878. In 1878, Steere moved to Sault Ste. Marie, Michigan to practice law. He served as prosecuting attorney. From 1881 to 1911, Steere served as Michigan circuit court judge and was a Republican. Steere served on the Michigan Supreme Court from 1911 until 1927 and was the chief justice. Steere died in a hospital in Sault Ste. Marie, Michigan.
