= Walter Harper North =

American judge

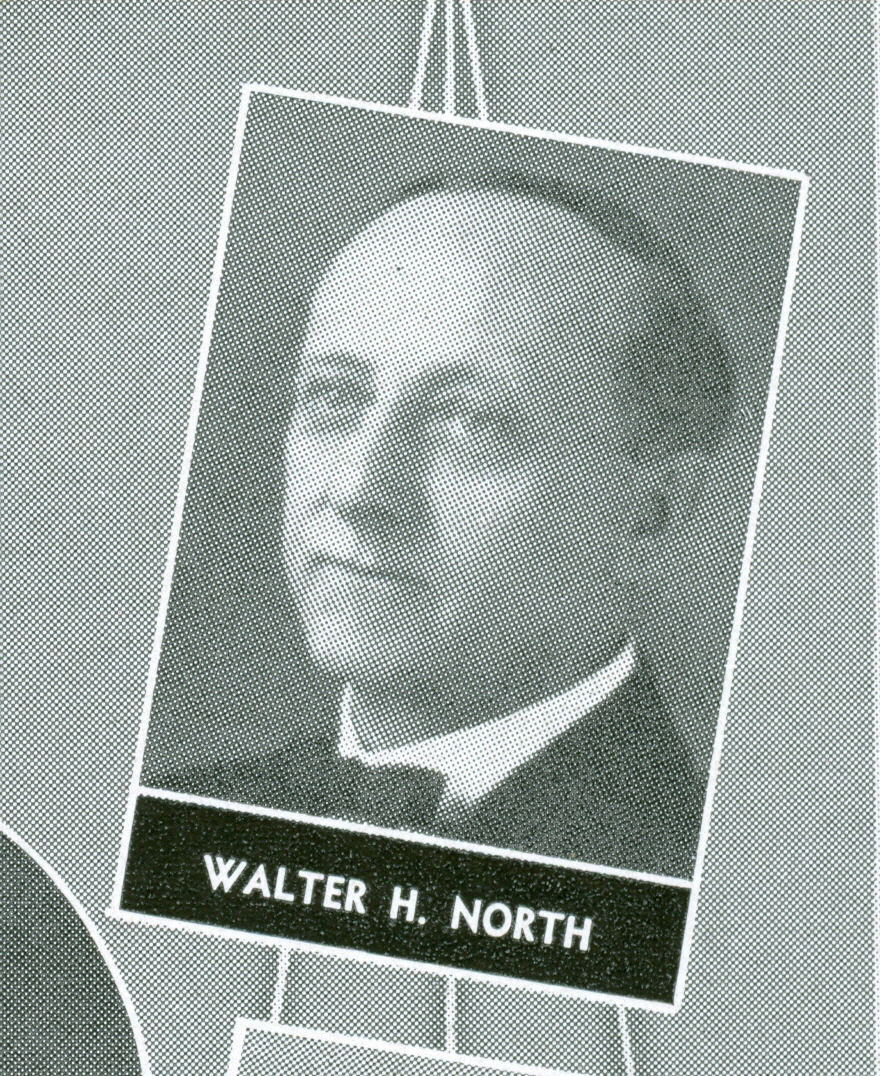
Walter H. North

Walter Harper North (November 1, 1871 – July 23, 1952) was an American jurist.

Born in Hillsdale County, Michigan, North received his bachelor's degree from University of Michigan Law School in 1899. North practiced law in Battle Creek, Michigan until 1906 when he was appointed Calhoun County, Michigan circuit court judge. North was a Republican. From 1927 until his death in 1952, North served on the Michigan Supreme Court and was chief justice. North died at University Hospital in Ann Arbor, Michigan.
