= Russell C. Ostrander =

American judge (1851–1919)

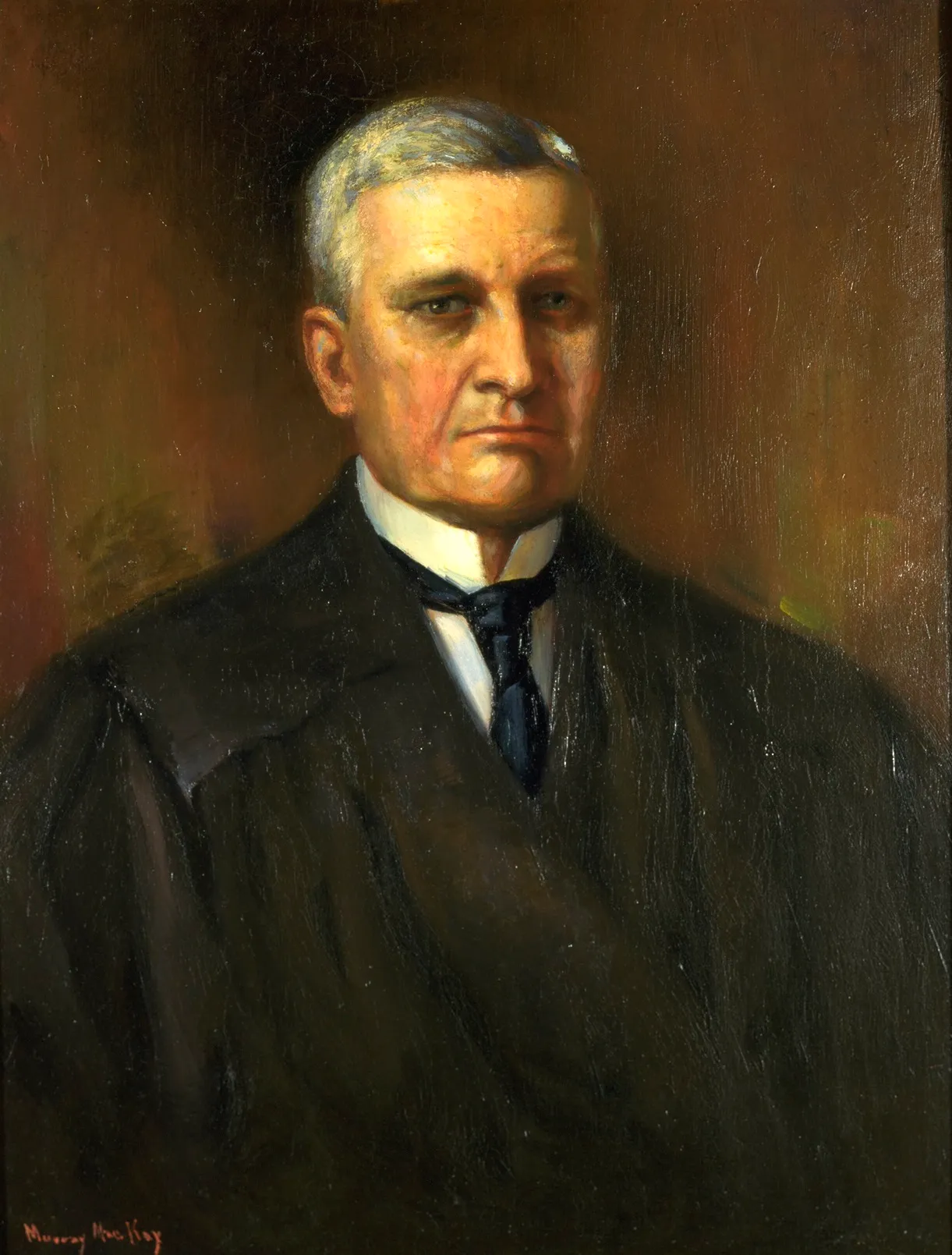
- Official portrait by Edwin Murray MacKay
- Born: September 1, 1851; Ypsilanti, Michigan
- Died: September 11, 1919 (aged 68)
- Education: University of Michigan Law School

Russell C. Ostrander (September 1, 1851 – September 11, 1919) was an American jurist.

Born in Ypsilanti, Michigan, Ostrander taught school and then worked in a general store. He then studied law at the University of Michigan Law School and was admitted to the Michigan bar in 1879. He practiced law, served as court commissioner, prosecuting attorney, city attorney of Lansing, Michigan. In 1896 and 1897, Ostrander served as mayor of Lansing and practiced law. Ostrander served on the Michigan Supreme Court from 1904 until his death in 1919. Ostrander was the chief justice of the court. Ostrander died at his house in Lansing, Michigan at the age of 68.

Russell Cowles Ostrander married Zay Dora Parker in on 8 May 1878. Four children born Michigan. Russell was eldest son of Simon Ostrander (1810-1881) and Ellen Gardner Cowles (1826-1886). Simon was son of Petrus Ostrander (1769-1851) He married Hannah Acker (1777-1866). Russell's ancestry can be traced back to Kingston, NY, where Rebecca Traphagen married Pieter Ostrander in 1679.
