= Grant Fellows =

American judge

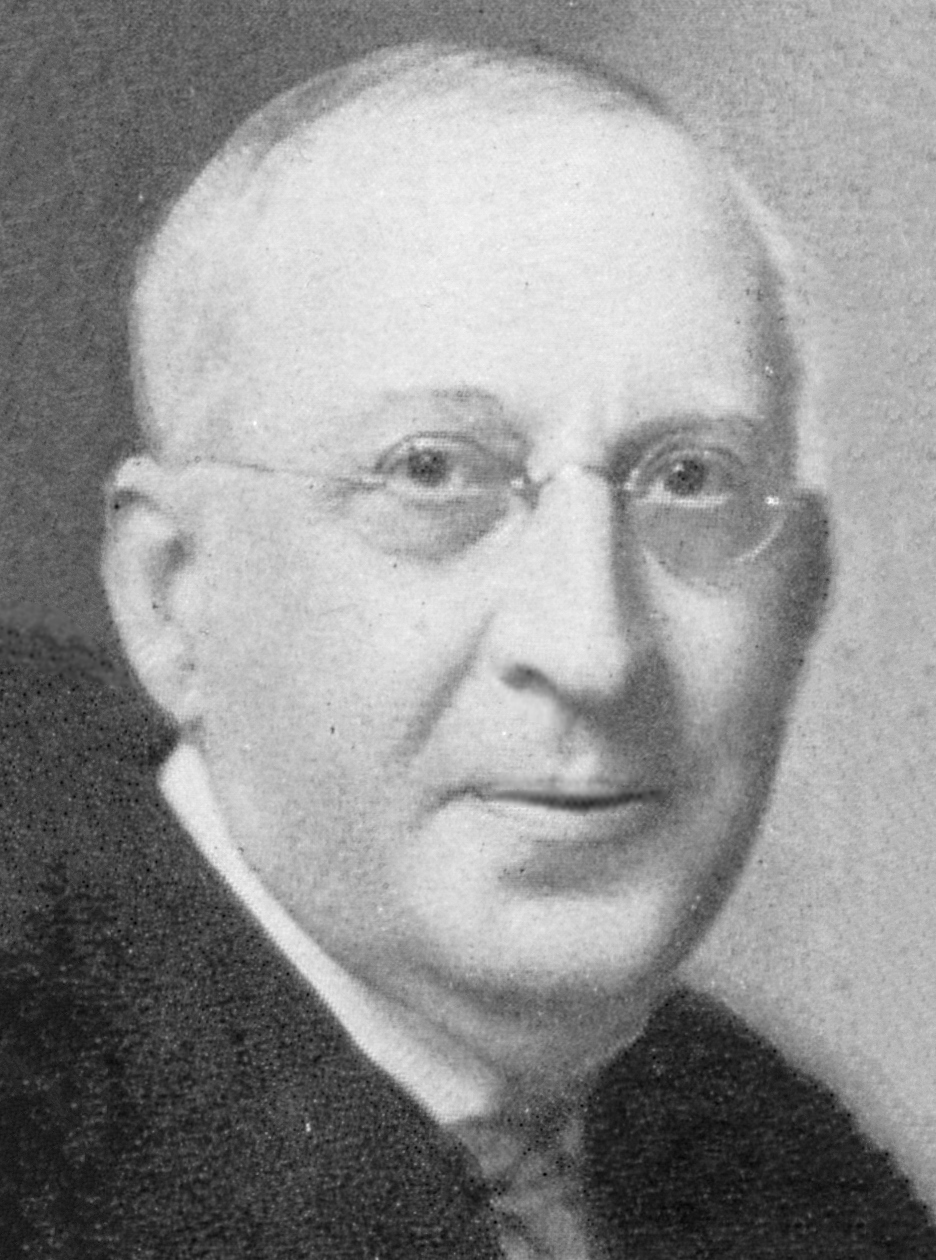
Fellows circa 1927

Grant Fellows (April 13, 1865 – July 16, 1929) was an American jurist.

Born in Hudson Township, Lenawee County, Michigan, Fellows went to Hudson High School in Hudson, Michigan. Fellows studied law and was admitted to the Michigan bar in 1886. He practiced law. In 1913, Fellows served as Michigan Attorney General and was a Republican. From 1917 until his death in 1929, Fellows served on the Michigan Supreme Court and was the chief justice in 1922. Fellows died in a hospital in Lansing, Michigan.

== Notes ==
Legal offices
| Preceded by Roger I. Wykes | Michigan Attorney General; 1913–1917 | Succeeded by Alex J. Groesbeck |
