= Isaac Marston =

American judge

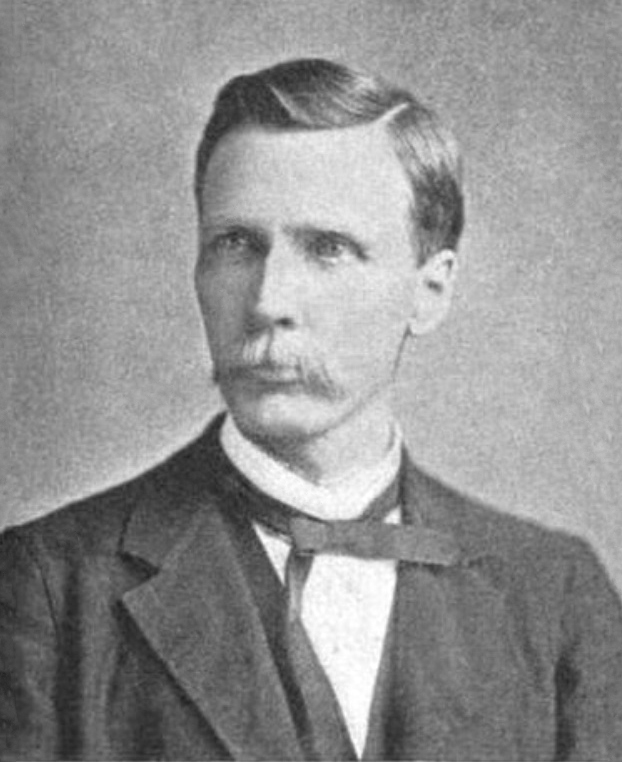
Michigan Supreme Court Justice Isaac Marston.

Isaac Marston (January 2, 1839 – October 31, 1891) was an American jurist and politician.

Born in Poyntzpass, County Armagh, Ireland, Marston emigrated to the United States and worked on a farm in Pontiac, Michigan with an uncle. In 1861, he graduated from University of Michigan Law School and practiced law in Ithaca, Michigan. In 1872, Marston won a special election as a Liberal Republican to serve the expired term of William R. Bates in the Michigan House of Representatives. He represented Bay County in the state House. Then, in 1874, Marston served as Michigan Attorney General. From 1875 to 1883, Marston served on the Michigan Supreme Court and was chief justice. He then practiced law in Detroit, Michigan. Marston died at his Riverside Farm near Bay City, Michigan.

== Notes ==
Legal offices
Preceded by Byron D. Ball	Michigan Attorney General; 1874–1875	Succeeded by Andrew J. Smith
