= Bert D. Chandler =

American judge

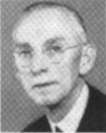
Bert D. Chandler

Bert D. Chandler (March 19, 1869 – December 13, 1947) was an American jurist.

Chandler was born in Rollin Township, Michigan. He studied the law and was admitted to the Michigan bar in 1890. Chandler practiced law, in Hudson, Michigan. He also served as a judge of the 39th Circuit from 1914 to 1915.

In November 1936, Chandler, a Democrat, defeated incumbent Republican Harry S. Toy, for a seat on the Michigan Supreme Court, by a vote of 862,147 to 755,227. Chandler served on the court from 1937 to 1943 and was chief justice. He was president of the Hudson Post-Gazette newspaper. Chandler died suddenly at his home in Hudson, Michigan.
