= George E. Bushnell =

American judge (1887–1965)

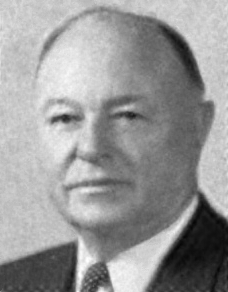
- George E. Bushnell c. 1956

Member of the Michigan Supreme Court
- In office 1934–1955

Personal details
- Born: November 4, 1887
- Died: September 30, 1965 (aged 77)
- Education: Virginia Tech; Detroit College of Law

George Edward Bushnell (November 4, 1887 – September 30, 1965) was a member of the Michigan Supreme Court from 1934 to 1955.

Born in Roanoke, Virginia, he graduated from Virginia Tech in 1907 with a degree in engineering. After working for a time at a New York advertising firm: Sperry and Hutchinson, Bushnell came to Detroit and studied at the Detroit College of Law. He practiced law in Detroit, Michigan, and was involved with the Democratic Party in Wayne County, Michigan. Bushnell served in the Motor Transportation Corps of the United States Army during World War I. Bushnell defeated incumbent justice George M. Clark, and served on the Michigan Supreme Court from 1934 to 1956.

Bushnell was active in Freemasonry for many years. Raised in Taylor Lodge No. 23 at Salem, Virginia in 1909, he also served as master of Sojourners Lodge No. 483 of Detroit in 1925. He received his 33° in 1924. Bushnell was a member of the Masonic Service Association European Committee sent abroad in 1945 to investigate the state of the Craft in Europe following the war.

Most significantly, he was elected to serve as the leader of the Northern Masonic Jurisdiction of the Scottish Rite of Freemasonry in 1953. He served in that position until he died of a cerebral hemorrhage in his hotel room while attending the annual meeting of the Scottish Rite Freemasons in Cleveland, Ohio. He had just conferred the 33 Degree on candidates the previous evening.
