= Warner Wing =

American judge

Warner Wing (September 19, 1805 – March 12, 1876) was an American jurist and legislator.

Born in Marietta, Ohio, Wing moved with his family to Detroit, Michigan Territory, in 1817. Wing studied law at the Northampton Law School in Northampton, Massachusetts. He moved to Monroe, Michigan Territory, in 1828, and practiced law. Wing served in the Michigan House of Representatives in 1837 and then in the Michigan State Senate in 1838 and 1839. Wing was a Democrat. Wing served on the Michigan Supreme Court from 1845 to 1856. He then resigned and was general counsel for the Lakeshore and Southern Michigan Railroad until his death. Wing died in Monroe, Michigan.
