= Henry M. Butzel =

American judge (1871–1963)

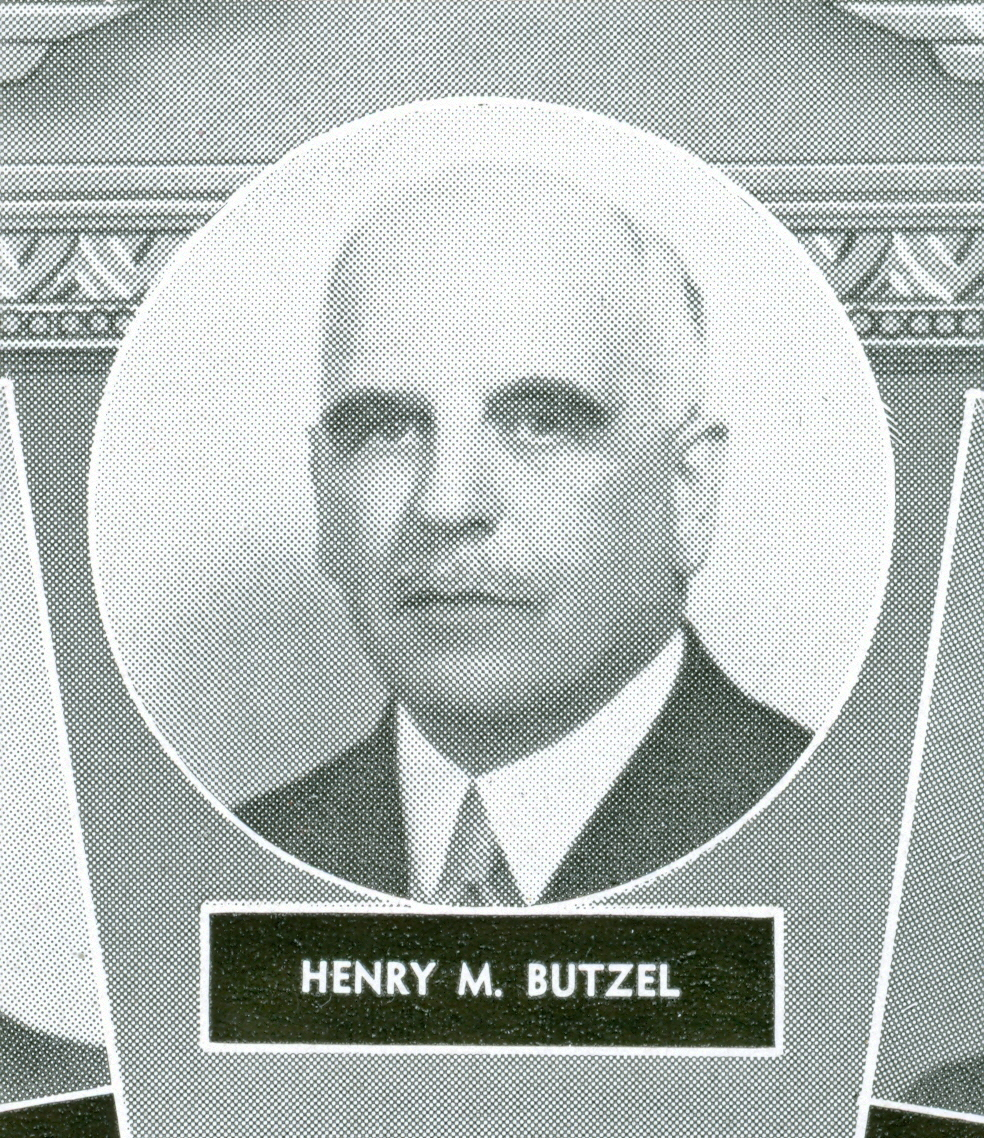
Henry M. Butzel

Henry M. Butzel (May 24, 1871 – June 7, 1963) was an American jurist.

Born in Detroit, Michigan, Butzel received both his undergraduate and his law degrees from the University of Michigan. He then practiced law in Detroit, Michigan. Butzel served on the Michigan Supreme Court from 1929 until 1955. Butzel died in Detroit, Michigan. He served as chief justice in 1939.

Among other opinions Butzel authored one in the 1910s that made Henry Ford pay back dividends to other share holders in his auto company.
