= 2010 Michigan elections =

- November 2, 2010

Elections were held in Michigan on Tuesday, November 2, 2010. Primary elections were held on August 3, 2010.

Major races included the gubernatorial election, which was won by Rick Snyder, a political novice and former CEO of Gateway, Inc. In the 2010 general election in Michigan, Republican candidates won all statewide executive offices, majorities in both state legislative chambers, 9 out of 15 U.S. House seats, and both seats up for election on the State Supreme Court.

== Federal ==
=== United States House ===
All 15 of Michigan's seats in the United States House of Representatives were up for election in 2010.

== Executive ==
=== Governor and lieutenant governor ===
Republican candidate Rick Snyder beat Democratic Party candidates Virg Bernero 58% to 40% to become Governor. Brian Calley was Snyder's running mate and was elected Lieutenant Governor.

=== Secretary of state ===
Republican candidate Ruth Johnson won the election with 50.7%, Democratic Party candidate Jocelyn Benson got 45.2%, Libertarian Party candidate Scotty Boman got 1.8%, U.S. Taxpayers Party candidate Robert Gale got 1.3% and Green Party candidate John A. La Pietra got 1.0%.

=== Attorney general ===
Republican candidate Bill Schuette won the election with 52% of the votes, while Democrat David Leyton got 43.5%. Libertarian Party candidate Daniel W. Grow got 2%, and U.S. Taxpayers Party candidate Gerald Van Sickle got 1.9%.

== Legislature ==
=== Senate ===
Prior to the November 2010 election, in the Michigan Senate the Democratic Party had 16 seats and the Republican Party had 22. After the election, the Republican Party gained 4 seats, giving them 26 seats over the Democratic Party's 12.

=== House of Representatives ===
Prior to the November 2010 election, the Democratic Party held 65 seats in the House and the Republican Party held 42 seats. The Democratic Party lost 18 total seats, and after this election had 47, while the Republican Party's victory brought them up to 63 seats in the House, swaying the Michigan House of Representatives' majority from the Democratic Party to the Republican Party.

== Judiciary ==
=== Supreme Court ===
2010 Michigan Supreme Court election
- November 2, 2010

2 seats of the Supreme Court of Michigan
	Majority party	Minority party
Party	Republican	Democratic
Last election	4	3
Seats won	2	0
Seat change	▲1	▼1

Republican Party candidates Mary Beth Kelly and Robert P. Young Jr. won with 29.44% and 27.88% respectively. The two defeated Democratic Party candidates Alton Davis and Denise Langford-Morris, who got 19.32% and 17.28% of the vote respectively, and independent Bob Roddis, who claimed 5.58%.

==== General election ====
2010 Michigan Supreme Court election
Party	Candidate	Votes	%
Nonpartisan	Mary Beth Kelly	1,408,294	29.94
Nonpartisan	Robert P. Young Jr. (incumbent)	1,310,986	27.88
Nonpartisan	Alton Davis (incumbent)	908,642	19.32
Nonpartisan	Denise Langford-Morris	812,485	17.28
Nonpartisan	Bob Roddis	262,654	5.58
Total votes		4,703,061	100.00

=== Court of Appeals ===
1st District candidates Cynthia Stephens and Kurtis T. Wilder were re-elected with 56.12% and 43.88% of the vote. 2nd District candidate Pat Donofrio was re-elected with 100% of the vote. 3rd District candidates Joel P. Hoekstra, David H. Sawyer and Douglas Shapiro were re-elected with 52.32%, 47.68% and 100% of the vote. 4th District candidates Donald S. Owens and William C. Whitbeck were re-elected with 51.90% and 48.10% of the vote. All candidates ran uncontested.

== Ballot initiatives ==
=== Proposal 1 ===
2010 Michigan Proposal 1 was an automatic ballot referral in the state of Michigan which was voted on in November. It was asking whether or not the state should call for a constitutional convention to review and edit the state constitution, and no won.

=== Proposal 2 ===
The Michigan Felon Politician Ban Amendment, Proposal 2 was approved, banning felons from running for any political or public office.
