= 2018 Michigan elections =

- November 6, 2018

The 2018 Michigan elections were held on Tuesday, November 6, 2018, throughout Michigan. The Democrats swept all of the statewide offices formerly held by the Republicans.

== Federal ==
=== United States Senate ===
Incumbent Democratic senator Debbie Stabenow won re-election to a fourth term.

=== United States House of Representatives ===
Democrats gained two House seats in the United States House of Representatives, giving Michigan's House delegation an even split with seven Democrats and seven Republicans.

== Executive ==
=== Governor and lieutenant governor ===
The Democratic ticket of Gretchen Whitmer and Garlin Gilchrist won the races for governor and lieutenant governor. This was a Democratic gain.

=== Secretary of state ===
Former Wayne State University Law School dean Jocelyn Benson was elected secretary of state, which was a Democratic gain. She became the first Democratic Michigan Secretary of State since 1995.

=== Attorney general ===
Detroit-based attorney Dana Nessel was elected Michigan attorney general, becoming the first Democratic attorney general in 16 years.

=== State Board of Education ===
Michigan State Board of Education, 2018
Party	Candidate	Votes	%
Democratic Party	Judith Pritchett	1,830,312	25.2
Democratic Party	Tiffany Tilley	1,743,379	24.0
Republican Party	Tami Carlone	1,615,129	22.3
Republican Party	Richard Zeile (incumbent)	1,473,904	20.3
Working Class Party	Mary Anne Hering	125,693	1.7
Libertarian Party	Scott Boman	125,309	1.7
Working Class Party	Logan Smith	91,077	1.3
Libertarian Party	John Tatar	80,414	1.1
U.S. Taxpayers Party	Karen Adams	72,639	1.0
Green Party	Sherry A. Wells	61,493	0.8
U.S. Taxpayers Party	Douglas Levesque	32,326	0.4
Total votes		7,251,675	100.0

== Legislature ==
=== Senate ===
All 38 seats in the Michigan Senate were up for election in 2018. Democrats gained five seats, but Republicans still control 22 seats in the Michigan Senate.

=== House of Representatives ===
All 110 seats in the Michigan House of Representatives were up for election in 2018. Democrats gained five seats, but Republicans still control the Michigan House with 58 Republicans and 52 Democrats.

== Judiciary ==
=== Supreme Court ===
2018 Michigan Supreme Court election
- November 6, 2018

2 seats of the Supreme Court of Michigan
	Majority party	Minority party
Party	Republican	Democratic
Last election	5	2
Seats won	1	1
Seats after	4	3
Seat change	▼1	▲1

Two seats on the Michigan Supreme Court were up for election in 2018. Justice Kurt Wilder, who was appointed by Governor Snyder to replace retiring justice Robert P. Young Jr., and Justice Beth Clement, who was named by Governor Snyder to replace Justice Joan Larsen after the latter was confirmed to a seat on the U.S. 6th Circuit Court of Appeals in November, 2017, were eligible to run for re-election. The two winners of the election were Clement and Megan Cavanagh, who unseated Wilder.

==== Candidates ====
- Samuel Bagenstos (Democratic), law professor at University of Michigan
- Megan Cavanagh (Democratic), appellate lawyer at Garan Lucow Miller P.C
- Elizabeth Clement (Republican), incumbent associate justice of the Supreme Court of Michigan
- Doug Dern (Natural Law), private law practice owner
- Kerry Lee Morgan (Libertarian), counsel at Pentiuk, Couvreur & Kobiljak, P.C.
- Kurtis Wilder (Republican), incumbent associate justice of the Supreme Court of Michigan

==== Results ====
2018 Michigan Supreme Court Associate Justice (2 seats) election
Party	Candidate	Votes	%
Nonpartisan	Elizabeth Clement (incumbent)	1,871,462	29.88%
Nonpartisan	Megan Cavanagh	1,584,512	25.30%
Nonpartisan	Kurtis Wilder (incumbent)	1,519,394	24.26%
Nonpartisan	Samuel Bagenstos	717,062	11.45%
Nonpartisan	Kerry Lee Morgan	360,858	5.76%
Nonpartisan	Doug Dern	209,103	3.34%
Total votes		3,445,563	100.0%
Republican hold			
Democratic gain from Republican			

=== Court of Appeals ===
==== District 1 (six-year term - 2 positions) ====
Candidate	Votes	%
Kirsten Frank Kelly	572,883	56.1
Michael Riordan	447,658	43.9
Total votes	1,020,541	100.0

==== District 1 (partial term ending 1/1/2023) ====
Candidate	Votes	%
Thomas Cameron	591,516	100.00

==== District 2 (six-year term - 3 positions) ====
Candidate	Votes	%
Kathleen Jansen	592,091	34.2
Elizabeth L. Gleicher	570,856	33.0
Deborah Servitto	566,771	32.8
Total votes	1,729,718	100.0

==== District 2 (partial term ending 1/1/2021) ====
Candidate	Votes	%
Jonathan Tukel	683,743	100.00

==== District 3 (six-year term - 2 positions) ====
Candidate	Votes	%
Jane M. Beckering	678,505	52.1
Douglas Shapiro	622,681	47.9
Total votes	1,301,186	100.0

==== District 4 (six-year term) ====
Candidate	Votes	%
Stephen L. Borrello	744,970	100.00

==== District 4 (partial term ending 1/1/2023) ====
Candidate	Votes	%
Brock Swartzle	730,278	100.00

== Ballot initiatives ==
=== Proposal 1 ===

Proposal 1, an initiative to legalize cannabis, was approved 56–44.

Proposal 1
Choice	Votes	%
For	2,356,422	55.89
Against	1,859,675	44.11
Total	4,216,097	100.00

=== Proposal 2 ===

Proposal 2 was an initiative to transfer the power to draw state Legislative districts and US Congressional districts from the state legislature to an independent redistricting commission. The proposal passed 61–39.

Proposal 2
Choice	Votes	%
For	2,516,998	61.28
Against	1,590,638	38.72
Total	4,107,636	100.00

=== Proposal 3 ===

Proposal 3, an initiative to add voting policies such as same-day registration and straight-ticket voting to the state constitution, was approved 67–33.

Proposal 3
Choice	Votes	%
For	2,772,301	66.92
Against	1,370,662	33.08
Total	4,142,963	100.00
