= 2026 Michigan elections =

U.S. state elections

- November 3, 2026

The 2026 Michigan elections took place on November 3, 2026. The state's class 2 seat in the United States Senate was up for election alongside all of the state's 13 seats in the United States House of Representatives. Other statewide elections taking place were elections for the state's governor and lieutenant governor, secretary of state, attorney general, and supreme court. All districts in the Michigan House of Representatives and Michigan Senate were up for election, as well as various local offices.

== Federal ==
=== United States Senate ===
In January 2025, incumbent Democratic senator Gary Peters announced that he would not seek re-election, leaving an open seat. Democratic public health official Abdul El-Sayed defeated Republican former U.S. representative Mike Rogers to take the seat, becoming the first Muslim ever elected to the Senate.

=== United States House of Representatives ===
All of Michigan's seats in the U.S. House of Representatives are up for election. Following the 2024 elections, Republicans flipped a seat held by Democrats and gained control of the majority of the state's congressional districts. This year, Democrat flipped three seats to regain the majority, with the new delegation standing at 9 Democrats and 4 Republicans.

== Executive ==
=== Governor and lieutenant governor ===
Incumbent Democratic governor Gretchen Whitmer and lieutenant governor Garlin Gilchrist were term-limited and ineligible to seek re-election as governor and lieutenant governor respectively. This election was won by incumbent secretary of state and Democratic gubernatorial nominee Jocelyn Benson, alongside her running mate Winnie Brinks. They defeated Republican gubernatorial nominee John James and his running mate Jay DeBoyer.

=== Secretary of state ===
Incumbent Democratic secretary of state Jocelyn Benson was term-limited and ineligible to seek re-election. The election was won by the state's lieutenant governor, Democrat Garlin Gilchrist, who defeated Republican nominee Anthony Forlini.

=== Attorney general ===
Incumbent Democratic attorney general Dana Nessel was term-limited and ineligible to seek re-election. The election was won by Democratic nominee Eli Savit, who defeated Republican nominee Doug Lloyd.

== Legislature ==
=== Senate ===
All 38 seats in the Michigan Senate were up for election. Democrats currently have a majority with 20 seats, while Republicans hold 18 seats. There was a vacancy after Democrat Kristen McDonald Rivet resigned her seat following her election to the United States House of Representatives, but a fellow Democrat, Chedrick Greene, was later elected in a special election to replace her.

In 2023, several districts in the metro Detroit area were struck down as unconstitutional and the redistricting panel was ordered to draw new maps that could be used. A final map was chosen in July 2024 and new district lines were in effect for the 2026 elections.

In the 2026 election, Democrats retained control of the state Senate. They gained 3 seats, resulting in a 23–15 majority over the Republicans.

=== House of Representatives ===
All 110 seats in the Michigan House of Representatives were up for election. Following the 2024 elections, Republicans flipped four seats and gained control of the chamber.

In the 2026 election, Democrats gained control of the state House. They gained 11 seats, resulting in a 63–47 majority over the Republicans.

== Judiciary ==
=== Supreme Court ===
Two seats on the Michigan Supreme Court were up for election, both held by Democratic justices. The incumbent Democrats Megan Cavanagh and Noah Hood defeated Republican nominees Casandra Morse-Bills and Michael Warren. This preserved the 6–1 majority the Democrats held on the court.

== Michigan Board of Education and University boards ==
=== Michigan State Board of Education ===
Two seats on the Michigan State Board of Education were up for election, both held by Democratic members. The Democratic incumbents Tiffany Tilley and Judith Pritchett defeated Republican nominees Terence Collins and Bree Moeggenberg. This preserved the 6–2 majority the Democrats held on the board.

=== Michigan State University Board of Trustees ===
Two seats on the Michigan State University Board of Trustees were up for election, both held by Democratic trustees. The election was won by incumbent Democrats Brianna Scott and Kelly Tebay Zemke, defeating Republican nominees Julie Maday and Roger Victory. This preserved the 7–1 majority the Democrats held on the board.

=== University of Michigan Board of Regents ===
Two seats on the University of Michigan Board of Regents were up for election, both held by Democratic regents. Democratic incumbent Paul W. Brown was renominated, but fellow incumbent Jordan Acker was defeated by Amir Makled at the Democratic convention. Brown and Makled defeated Republican nominees Michael Schostak and Lena Epstein. This preserved the 6–2 majority the Democrats held on the board.

=== Wayne State University Board of Governors ===
Two seats on the Wayne State University Board of Governors were up for election, both held by Democratic governors. Neither incumbent, Bryan Barnhill nor Anil Kumar, ran for re-election. Democratic nominees Shereef Akeel and Richard Mack defeated Republican nominees Andy Anuzis and Christa Murphy. This preserved the 5–3 majority the Democrats held on the board.

== Ballot initiatives ==
=== Proposal 1 ===
Proposal 1 is an automatic ballot referral proposed every sixteen years asking voters on whether or not the state should hold a constitutional convention. This proposal was last voted on in 2010 and was widely rejected. Proposal 1 was rejected by voters.

=== Proposal 2 ===
Proposal 2 is a popular initiative that would prohibit electric and gas utility companies with over $250,000 annually in state government contracts from making campaign contributions to those running or holding government offices that impact them. This would also include company officials, their immediate family members, and other closely connected people. Proposal 2 was approved by voters.

== Local elections ==
Similar to other states, many counties and cities in Michigan held local elections at the same time as other statewide and federal elections. The following is an incomplete list of local elections in notable communities.

=== County elections ===
- 2026 Macomb County Executive election
- 2026 Wayne County Executive election

=== Mayoral elections ===
- 2026 Flint mayoral election
