= 2026 Michigan Proposal 1 =

Proposal 1
- November 3, 2026
- Shall a convention of elected delegates be convened in 2027 to draft a general revision of the state constitution for presentation to the state’s voters for their approval or rejection?

Results
Choice	Votes	%
Yes	1,119,332	26.25%
No	3,144,721	73.75%
Total votes	4,264,053	100.00%
County results
No
70–80%
60–70%

A referendum on holding a constitutional convention took place on November 3, 2026, as part of the 2026 Michigan elections. The referendum is an automatic ballot referral, with the question being posed to voters every sixteen years.

== Background ==
The Michigan Constitution requires that a question on holding a constitutional convention be automatically referred to voters every sixteen years as the first proposal on the general election ballot. This requirement was originally added to the constitution by Proposal 3 in 1960. Voters approved holding a convention in 1961, and the rewritten constitution, adopted by voters in 1963, retained the requirement. Voters have rejected the question by wide margins in every subsequent election (1978, 1994, and at its most recent referral in 2010).

== Contents ==
This proposal appeared on the ballot as follows:

A proposal to convene a constitutional convention for the purpose of drafting a general revision of the state constitution.

Shall a convention of elected delegates be convened in 2027 to draft a general revision of the state constitution for presentation to the state’s voters for their approval or rejection?

== Endorsements ==
Yes

State representatives

- Matt Hall, speaker of the Michigan House of Representatives (2025–present) from HD-42 (2019–present) (Republican)

State senators

- Jonathan Lindsey, SD-17 (2023–present) (Republican)
- Aric Nesbitt, minority leader of the Michigan Senate (2023–present) from SD-20 (2019–present) (Republican)
No

U.S. representatives

- Dan Kildee, former MI-08 (2013–2025) (Democratic)

Statewide officials

- Bill Schuette, former attorney general of Michigan (2011–2019) (Republican)
- Gretchen Whitmer, governor of Michigan (2019–present) (Democratic)

Labor unions

- International Brotherhood of Electrical Workers
- Michigan AFL-CIO
- Michigan Education Association
- Service Employees International Union
- United Association Local 174
- United Auto Workers

Organizations

- ACLU of Michigan
- Americans for Prosperity Michigan
- Business Leaders for Michigan
- Equality Michigan
- League of Women Voters of Michigan
- Michigan Association of School Boards
- Michigan Catholic Conference
- Michigan Chamber of Commerce
- Michigan League of Conservation Voters
- Michigan Realtors
- Michigan State Medical Society
- Michigan Townships Association
- Planned Parenthood Advocates of Michigan
- Reproductive Freedom for All
- Right to Life of Michigan
- Small Business Association of Michigan

Political parties

- Michigan Working Families Party

Newspapers

- Detroit Free Press

== Results ==
Proposal 1
Choice	Votes	%
For	1,119,332	26.25
Against	3,144,721	73.75
Total	4,264,053	100.00
