= List of Phi Mu members =

Phi Mu is an American college women's fraternity. The fraternity was founded at Wesleyan College in Macon, Georgia as the Philomathean Society in 1852. On June 24, 1904, the society was chartered as a national organization, Phi Mu, in the State of Georgia. Following are some of the notable members of Phi Mu.

== Education ==
- Mary Dorothy Lyndon (Alpha Alpha) – educator, the first female graduate from the University of Georgia

== Entertainment ==
- Ella Langley (Alpha Mu) - Country music singer and decorated recording artist.
- Kathrine Baumann (Delta Kappa) - First runner-up Miss America 1970, American actress, model, and couture handbag designer.
- Andi Dorfman (Alpha Eta) – contestant on The Bachelorette (2014) and the Bachelor
- Vivian Fridell (Zeta Beta) – radio actress
- Hannah Godwin (Kappa Chi) – model and contestant on The Bachelor (2019) and Bachelor in Paradise (2019)
- Frances Greer (Alpha Eta) – opera singer
- Elizabeth Horton (Gamma Tau) – Miss North Carolina (2006) and meteorologist
- Dana Ivey (Alpha Omega) – actress and five-time Tony Award nominee
- Hallie Jackson (Gamma Tau) – television reporter and news anchor
- Hayley Lewis (Theta) – Miss Tennessee 2014 and sports anchor
- Pam Long (Theta Alpha) – Emmy Award winning television producer and writer; head writer for CBS' Guiding Light
- Karrie Martin (Alpha Eta) – actress
- Madeline Mitchell (Alpha Zeta) – Miss Alabama USA (2011) and Mrs. America 2015
- Pat Mitchell (Alpha Alpha) – president and CEO of PBS
- Rachel Reilly (Gamma Mu) – actress and contestant on Big Brother and The Amazing Race
- Joanne Rogers (Alpha Omega) – musician and wife of Fred Rogers
- Kimberly Schlapman (Alpha Gamma) – member of Little Big Town
- Mary Wickes (Zeta Epsilon) – actress known for White Christmas (1954 film), and Sister Act

== Law ==
- Beverly B. Martin (Alpha Iota) – judge on the United States Court of Appeals for the Eleventh Circuit
- Betty Montgomery (Delta Kappa) – Ohio Attorney General and Ohio State Auditor
- Elizabeth Weaver (Delta) – former chief justice of the Michigan Supreme Court

== Literature ==
- Charlotte Armstrong (Zeta Beta) – novelist and writer
- Elin Hilderbrand (Gamma Tau) – novelist
- Grace Lumpkin (Mu) – writer of proletarian literature
- Katharine DuPre Lumpkin (Mu) – writer and sociologist
- Clarine Coffin Grenfell (Pi) – poet and writer
- Jill McCorkle (Gamma Lambda) – novelist and short story writer
- May Merrill Miller (Eta Alpha) – writer and poet
- Joyce Carol Oates (Beta Zeta) – author and playwright
- Saira Rao (Gamma Omega) – author, publisher, and television producer
- Kathryn Stockett (Alpha Zeta) – novelist known for The Help
- Kathrine Taylor (Eta Gamma) – novelist

== Politics and activism ==
- Betty DeGeneres (Alpha Eta) – LGBT rights activist
- Carol C. Laise (Gamma Delta) – U.S. Ambassador to Nepal and first female Assistant Secretary of State
- Melinda Schwegmann (Alpha Eta) – first female Lieutenant Governor of Louisiana
- Charlotte Pritt – first major-party woman gubernatorial nominee in West Virginia

== Science and technology ==
- Jerrie Mock (Psi) – author and first woman to fly solo around the world
- Kathy Pham (Theta Zeta) – computer scientist
- Jackie Ronne (Beta Alpha) – first female member of an Antarctic expedition
- Mary Ellen Weber (Delta Epsilon) – NASA astronaut

== Sports ==
- Gayle S. Barron (Alpha Alpha) – winner of the Boston Marathon, 1978
- Iris Cummings (Iota Sigma) – competition swimmer who represented the United States at the 1936 Summer Olympics
- Danielle Donehew (Theta Zeta) – president of the Women's Basketball Hall of Fame board of directors and executive vice president of the Atlanta Dream

== See also ==
- List of Phi Mu chapters
