= List of Phi Mu chapters =

Phi Mu is a social collegiate sorority that is a member of the a National Panhellenic Conference. The sorority's chapter naming convention appears to utilize a first letter indicative of a state or region, thus many Pennsylvania chapter designations begin with "Phi"; however there are some exceptions to this rule where a name was derived from a predecessor local.

In the following list, active chapters are noted in bold and inactive chapters and institutions are in italics.

Chapter	Charter date and range	Institution	City	State	Status	Ref.
Alpha	March 4, 1852–1914	Wesleyan College	Macon	Georgia	Inactive	(Note: This chapter originated as the Philomathean Society, established in 1852, and which renamed itself with an aim to national expansion in 1904.) (Note: In an August 1912 report published in the Adelphean, Ms. Newell Mason, a faculty member at Wesleyan and Historian for Alpha Delta Pi, noted that "College authorities are violently opposed to sororities." A ten-year battle was fought by several NPC organizations, but lost in 1917 when the last members of its four sororities, Alpha Delta Pi, Phi Mu, Zeta Tau Alpha and Delta Delta Delta graduated.)
Beta	1904–1929	Hollins University	Hollins	Virginia	Inactive	(Note: All seven sororities at the school were forced to close in 1929.)
Gamma	1904–1909	Salem College	Winston-Salem	North Carolina	Inactive	(Note: The school's remaining sororities were forced to close in 1936.)
**Delta**	1906–1992; 2009	Tulane University	New Orleans	Louisiana	Active	
Upsilon (first)	1906–1910	Saint Mary's Seminary	Raleigh	North Carolina	Inactive	(Note: This chapter originated as Upsilon Delta (local) in 1902.) (Note: The school's remaining sororities closed by 1911.) (Note: In addition to its prep school model, serving grades 9-12, this school provided a two-year collegiate curriculum until 1998 when it became a four-year high school, only.)
Zeta	January 9, 1907–1910	Chevy Chase College and Seminary	Chevy Chase	Maryland	Inactive	(Note: Originally a finishing school founded in 1902, this school, under several names, became a junior college in 1938 and finally closed in 1950.)
Eta	1907–1911	Hardin College	Mexico	Missouri	Inactive	(Note: Originally a finishing school founded in 1858, by 1901 this school was recognized as the first junior college in the state of Missouri. It closed in 1931.)
**Theta**	1907–1911; 1998	Belmont University	Nashville	Tennessee	Active	(Note: This chapter originated as Sigma Tau Psi (local) in 1905. At its 1998 restoration it absorbed Kappa Delta Sigma (local).)
Xi Kappa	May 1, 1908–1932; 1941–1982	Southwestern University	Georgetown	Texas	Inactive	(Note: This chapter originated as Xi Kappa (local) in 1906.)
**Kappa**	May 15, 1908–1916; 1918	University of Tennessee	Knoxville	Tennessee	Active	(Note: This chapter originated as Alpha Tau (local) in 1906.)
**Mu**	1910	Brenau University	Gainesville	Georgia	Active	(Note: This chapter absorbed Alpha Delta Theta's Omicron chapter as part of the national merger in 1939.)
Lambda	1910–1960	Randolph College	Lynchburg	Virginia	Inactive	
Xi	1911–1941; 1966–1980	University of New Mexico	Albuquerque	New Mexico	Inactive	(Note: This chapter originated as Sigma Kappa Beta (local) in 1909.)
**Nu**	1911–1912; 2004	Shorter University	Rome	Georgia	Active	(Note: This chapter absorbed Delta Sigma Tau (local) at its 2004 restoration, a group that had formed in 1973.)
Omicron	1912–1978	University of Akron	Akron	Ohio	Inactive	(Note: This chapter originated as Theta Sigma Chi (local) in 1907.)
**Pi**	1912-2025	University of Maine	Orono	Maine	Inactive	(Note: This chapter originated as Phi Alpha (local) which had formed earlier in 1912.)
Sigma	1912–1976	Knox College	Galesburg	Illinois	Inactive	
**Rho**	1913	Hanover College	Hanover	Indiana	Active	(Note: This chapter originated as Phi Theta Nu (local) which had formed in 1911.)
Upsilon (second)	1913–1998	Ohio State University	Columbus	Ohio	Inactive	
Phi	1913–1965	University of Texas at Austin	Austin	Texas	Inactive	
**Chi**	1913–1942; 2002	University of Missouri	Columbia	Missouri	Active	
Tau	1913–1955	Whitman College	Walla Walla	Washington	Inactive	
**Psi**	1913–1974; 2018	Adelphi University	Garden City	New York	Active	(Note: This chapter originated as Phi Alpha (local) in 1911. It absorbed Alpha Delta Theta's Xi chapter as part of the national merger in 1939.)
**Epsilon**	1914	Millsaps College	Jackson	Mississippi	Active	(Note: This chapter originated as Phi Zeta (local) in 1910.)
Iota	1914–1935	Lawrence College	Appleton	Wisconsin	Inactive	
Omega	1914–1939	Iowa Wesleyan University	Mount Pleasant	Iowa	Inactive	
Beta Alpha	March 7, 1915–1950	George Washington University	Washington	District of Columbia	Inactive	(Note: This chapter originated as The Group (local) in 1914. It absorbed Alpha Delta Theta's Lambda chapter as part of the national merger in 1939.)
Iota Sigma	1915–1950	University of Southern California	Los Angeles	California	Inactive	(Note: This chapter originated as Iota Sigma (local) in 1911. It absorbed Alpha Delta Theta's Phi chapter as part of the national merger in 1939.)
Epsilon Alpha	1915–1935; 1977–1992	Southern Methodist University	University Park	Texas	Inactive	
Zeta Alpha	1916–2011	Baker University	Baldwin City	Kansas	Inactive	(Note: This chapter originated as Kappa Theta (local) in 1916.)
Eta Alpha	1916–1979; 1980–1990	University of California, Berkeley	Berkeley	California	Inactive	(Note: This chapter originated as Kel Thaida (local) in 1911.)
**Eta Beta**	1917–1996; 2015	University of Washington	Seattle	Washington	Active	(Note: This chapter originated as the ה (Hay) chapter of Achoth, established on May 11, 1914. Achoth was a national sorority which would rename itself Phi Omega Pi in 1921. By 1923 the Hebrew letter Hay was retired as a chapter designation, with the University of Washington chapter taking the name Epsilon chapter of Phi Omega Pi.)
Beta Beta	1919–1944	Colby College (Note: Fraternities and sororities were permanently banned at Colby College in 1984.)	Waterville	Maine	Inactive	(Note: This chapter originated as Gamma Delta (local) in 1917.)
Beta Gamma	1919–1995	University of New Hampshire	Durham	New Hampshire	Inactive	(Note: This chapter originated as Pi Delta (local) in 1916.)
Zeta Beta	1919–1941	University of Wisconsin–Madison	Madison	Wisconsin	Inactive	(Note: This chapter originated as the Phi Mu club (local) in 1918.)
Beta Epsilon	1919–1934	Swarthmore College	Swarthmore	Pennsylvania	Inactive	(Note: This chapter originated as Alpha Theta Pi (local) in 1917.)
Beta Delta	1919–1967	Dickinson College	Carlisle	Pennsylvania	Inactive	(Note: This chapter originated as Alpha Gamma Phi (local) earlier in 1919.)
**Delta Alpha**	1920–1964; 1980	Indiana University Bloomington	Bloomington	Indiana	Active	(Note: This chapter originated as Alpha Epsilon (local) in 1918.)
Beta Zeta	1920–1970	Syracuse University	Syracuse	New York	Inactive	(Note: This chapter originated as Mu Phi Epsilon (local) in 1916.)
Beta Theta	1921–1961	University of Pittsburgh	Pittsburgh	Pennsylvania	Inactive	(Note: This chapter originated as Alpha Mu (local) in 1920.)
**Alpha Alpha**	1921	University of Georgia	Athens	Georgia	Active	
**Zeta Gamma**	1921–1941; 1965	University of Nebraska–Lincoln	Lincoln	Nebraska	Active	(Note: This chapter originated as Sigma Beta (local) in 1920.)
Delta Beta	1921–1938; 1946–2011; 2016–2024	University of Illinois Urbana-Champaign	Champaign and Urbana	Illinois	Inactive	(Note: This chapter originated as Zeta Pi (local) in 1920.)
Zeta Delta	1921–1932; 1948–1952	Drake University	Des Moines	Iowa	Inactive	(Note: This chapter originated as Phi Sigma (local) earlier in 1921.)
Beta Kappa	1922–2000	Bucknell University	Lewisburg	Pennsylvania	Inactive	(Note: This chapter originated as Eta Sigma (local) in 1919.)
**Alpha Beta**	1923–1933; 1979–1996; 2012	University of Arkansas	Fayetteville	Arkansas	Active	(Note: This chapter originated as Kappa Phi (local) in 1922.)
Zeta Epsilon	1923–1966	Washington University	St. Louis County	Missouri	Inactive	(Note: This chapter originated as the Question Mark Club (local) in 1922.)
Epsilon Beta	1923–1944; 1955–1965; 1998–2007	University of Oklahoma	Norman	Oklahoma	Inactive	(Note: This chapter originated as Phi Zeta (local) earlier in 1923.)
Delta Gamma	May 30, 1924–1937	Ohio Wesleyan University	Delaware	Ohio	Inactive	(Note: This chapter originated as Theta Delta Kappa (local) in 1893.)
**Alpha Gamma**	1924	Samford University	Homewood	Alabama	Active	(Note: This chapter originated as Delta Gamma Sigma (local) in 1919. The chapter absorbed Alpha Delta Theta's Pi chapter as part of the national merger in 1939.)
**Zeta Eta**	January 10, 1925–1935; 1947–1970; 2016	University of Minnesota	Minneapolis	Minnesota	Active	(Note: This chapter originated as Zeta Eta (local) in 1923.)
Beta Lambda	1925–1952	Middlebury College	Middlebury	Vermont	Inactive	(Note: This chapter originated as Delta Omega Delta (local) in 1923.)
Zeta Theta	1925–1941	University of Iowa	Iowa City	Iowa	Inactive	(Note: This chapter originated as Alpha Gamma Phi (local) in 1921.)
**Gamma Alpha**	1926–2013; 2016	College of William & Mary	Williamsburg	Virginia	Active	(Note: This chapter originated as Iota Mu Pi (local) in 1922.)
**Alpha Delta**	June 7, 1926	University of Mississippi	Oxford	Mississippi	Active	
Delta Delta	1927–2003	Ohio University	Athens	Ohio	Inactive	(Note: This chapter originated as Alpha Kappa Gamma (local) in 1923.)
Eta Gamma	1927–1937	University of Oregon	Eugene	Oregon	Inactive	(Note: This chapter originated as Kappa Omicron (local) in 1923.)
Eta Delta	1927–1967; 1981–1987 ?	University of California, Los Angeles	Los Angeles	California	Inactive	(Note: This chapter originated as Alpha Chi Phi (local) in 1925. It absorbed Alpha Delta Theta's Mu chapter as part of the national merger in 1939.)
Gamma Beta	1927–1942	West Virginia University	Morgantown	West Virginia	Inactive	(Note: This chapter originated as the Woodlawn Club (local) in 1926.)
**Alpha Epsilon**	1929	Florida State University	Tallahassee	Florida	Active	(Note: This chapter originated as Alpha Epsilon (local) in 1927.)
Alpha Omega	1929–1997	Rollins College	Winter Park	Florida	Inactive	(Note: This chapter originated as Alpha Omega (local) in 1926.)
**Gamma Gamma**	1929	Queens University of Charlotte	Charlotte	North Carolina	Active	(Note: This chapter originated as Sigma Delta (local) in 1922. It absorbed Alpha Delta Theta's Psi chapter as part of the national merger in 1939.)
Beta Mu	1929–2018	Pennsylvania State University	Penn State University Park	Pennsylvania	Inactive	(Note: This chapter originated as the Trestrella Club (local) in 1927. It absorbed Theta Kappa Pi's Alpha chapter in 2005, founder of a small national sorority established in 1984.)
**Delta Epsilon**	1929	Purdue University	West Lafayette	Indiana	Active	(Note: This chapter originated as the Delathon Club (local) in 1921.)
Eta Epsilon	1930–1973; 1975–1987	University of Utah	Salt Lake City	Utah	Inactive	(Note: This chapter originated as Pi Epsilon Phi (local) in 1921.)
**Delta Zeta**	1931–1951; 2014	University of Cincinnati	Cincinnati	Ohio	Active	(Note: This chapter originated as Theta Pi (local) in 1925. It absorbed Alpha Delta Theta's Gamma chapter as part of the national merger in 1939.)
**Alpha Zeta**	November 19, 1931	University of Alabama	Tuscaloosa	Alabama	Active	(Note: This chapter originated as the Phi Club (local) in 1931.)
Zeta Iota	1932–2002	North Dakota State University	Fargo	North Dakota	Inactive	(Note: This chapter originated as Alpha Xi Beta (local) in 1928.)
**Gamma Delta**	1933	American University	Washington, D.C.	District of Columbia	Active	(Note: This chapter originated as Phi Sigma Beta (local) in 1929.)
**Alpha Eta**	1934	Louisiana State University	Baton Rouge	Louisiana	Active	
Gamma Epsilon	1934–1967; 1970–1987	Duke University	Durham	North Carolina	Inactive	(Note: This chapter originated as Delta Epsilon (local) in 1933. At its restoration in 1970 it absorbed Kappa Phi Lambda (local), a group that had formed in 1967. No relation to the latter-formed Asian-interest sorority.)
Alpha Theta	1937–1970	University of Tennessee at Chattanooga	Chattanooga	Tennessee	Inactive	(Note: This chapter originated as Chi Sigma Sigma (local) in 1930.)
**Alpha Iota**	December 2, 1938	Mercer University	Macon	Georgia	Active	(Note: This chapter originated as Sigma Phi (local) in 1932.)
**Delta Theta**	November 7, 1939	Transylvania University	Lexington	Kentucky	Active	(Note: This chapter originated as Alpha Theta (local) in 1916. With an aim to expand nationally, three years later, in 1919, the chapter renamed itself as the Alpha chapter of Alpha Delta Theta. It became the Delta Theta chapter of Phi Mu at the time of the national merger in 1939.)
Alpha Kappa	1939-2022	College of Charleston	Charleston	South Carolina	Inactive	(Note: This chapter originated as Pi Gamma Chi (local) in 1927. It became the Alpha Alpha chapter of Alpha Delta Theta in 1934, and then was named the Alpha Kappa chapter of Phi Mu at the time of the national merger.)
**Beta Nu**	1939	Bethany College	Bethany	West Virginia	Active	(Note: This chapter originated as Gamma Chi (local) in 1924. It became the Omega chapter of Alpha Delta Theta in 1932, and then was named the Beta Nu chapter of Phi Mu at the time of the national merger.)
Zeta Kappa	1939–1976; 1980–1984	Nebraska Wesleyan University	Lincoln	Nebraska	Inactive	(Note: This chapter originated as Omega Rho Omega (local) in 1907. It became the Nu chapter of Alpha Delta Theta in 1927, and then was named the Zeta Kappa chapter of Phi Mu at the time of the national merger.)
Epsilon Gamma	1939–1989	University of Tulsa	Tulsa	Oklahoma	Inactive	(Note: This chapter originated as Kappa Gamma Chi (local) in 1894. It became the Sigma chapter of Alpha Delta Theta in 1930, and then was named the Epsilon Gamma chapter of Phi Mu at the time of the national merger.)
Delta Iota	1942-2020	Baldwin Wallace University	Berea	Ohio	Inactive	(Note: This chapter originated as Theta Tau Delta (local) in 1939.)
Beta Xi	October 9, 1943–1963	University of Connecticut	Storrs	Connecticut	Inactive	(Note: This chapter originated as Phi Delta Upsilon (local) in 1942.)
**Alpha Lambda**	1943	Louisiana Tech University	Ruston	Louisiana	Active	(Note: This chapter originated as Kappa Alpha Zeta (local) in 1940.)
Beta Pi	1944–1970	Gettysburg College	Gettysburg	Pennsylvania	Inactive	(Note: This chapter originated as Phi Phi Phi (local) in 1938.)
**Alpha Mu**	1946	Auburn University	Auburn	Alabama	Active	
Delta Kappa	1946–2013	Bowling Green State University	Bowling Green	Ohio	Inactive	(Note: This chapter originated as Kappa Zeta Pi (local) in 1942.)
**Kappa Lambda**	1947	University of Memphis	Memphis	Tennessee	Active	(Note: This chapter originated as Kappa Lambda Sigma (local) in 1913.)
Beta Rho	1949–2008	Davis & Elkins College	Elkins	West Virginia	Inactive	(Note: This chapter originated as Iota Delta Chi (local) in 1946.)
Alpha Xi	1949–1991	Stetson University	DeLand	Florida	Inactive	
**Alpha Nu**	1949–1987; 1994	University of Florida	Gainesville	Florida	Active	
Beta Sigma	1950–1997	Indiana University of Pennsylvania	Indiana	Pennsylvania	Inactive	(Note: This chapter originated as Pi Gamma (local) in 1949.)
**Alpha Omicron**	1950	University of Southern Mississippi	Hattiesburg	Mississippi	Active	
Epsilon Delta	1951–2007	Arkansas State University	Jonesboro	Arkansas	Inactive	
**Eta Zeta**	1951	California State University, Fresno	Fresno	California	Active	(Note: This chapter originated as Delta Mu Phi (local) in 1925.)
Delta Lambda	1952–2024	University of Evansville	Evansville	Indiana	Inactive	(Note: This chapter originated as Theta Sigma (local) in 1922.)
Delta Mu	1953–1995	Youngstown State University	Youngstown	Ohio	Inactive	(Note: This chapter originated as Alpha Theta Delta (local) in 1938. Name similarity to Alpha Delta Theta (inverted letters) appears coincidental.)
**Gamma Zeta**	1953	High Point University	High Point	North Carolina	Active	(Note: This chapter originated as Alpha Theta Psi (local) in 1928.)
**Beta Tau**	1954	Drexel University	Philadelphia	Pennsylvania	Active	
Alpha Tau	1954–1993	Florida Southern College	Lakeland	Florida	Inactive	(Note: This chapter originated as Pi Theta Tau (local) in 1953.)
Delta Nu	1955–2002	Michigan State University	East Lansing	Michigan	Inactive	
Kappa Kappa	1955–1996	East Tennessee State University	Johnson City	Tennessee	Inactive	(Note: This chapter originated as Delta Kappa (local) in 1952.)
Gamma Eta	1955–2014	Roanoke College	Salem	Virginia	Inactive	(Note: This chapter originated as the Sphinx Club (local) in 1930.)
Eta Theta	1956–1966	San Jose State University	San Jose	California	Inactive	
**Alpha Pi**	1956	University of Houston	Houston	Texas	Active	(Note: This chapter originated as Sigma Mu Phi (local) in 1950.)
**Alpha Rho**	1956	University of Louisiana at Monroe	Monroe	Louisiana	Active	(Note: This chapter originated as Gamma Zeta (local) in 1950.)
**Alpha Sigma**	1956	University of Louisiana at Lafayette	Lafayette	Louisiana	Active	(Note: This chapter originated as Phi Delta Epsilon (local) in 1917.)
Delta Xi	1957–1965	University of Michigan	Ann Arbor	Michigan	Inactive	(Note: This chapter originated as the Alethia Club (local) in 1955.)
**Alpha Upsilon**	1958	McNeese State University	Lake Charles	Louisiana	Active	
Delta Omicron	1958–1974	University of Wisconsin–Milwaukee	Milwaukee	Wisconsin	Inactive	(Note: This chapter originated as Alpha Gamma Lambda (local) in 1932.)
Alpha Chi	1959–1981	Texas Tech University	Lubbock	Texas	Inactive	
Alpha Phi	1959–1973	Emory University	Atlanta	Georgia	Inactive	(Note: This chapter originated as the Philomathean Club (local) in 1953.)
**Gamma Theta**	1960–1978; 2010	James Madison University	Harrisonburg	Virginia	Active	(Note: This chapter originated as Delta Tau Alpha (local) in 1958.)
**Zeta Lambda**	1961	Northwest Missouri State University	Maryville	Missouri	Active	(Note: This chapter originated as Zeta Lambda (local) in 1959.)
**Beta Upsilon**	1961–1974; 1990	Westminster College	New Wilmington	Pennsylvania	Active	(Note: This chapter originated as Delta Chi (local) in 1959.)
Gamma Iota	1961–1983	Longwood University	Farmville	Virginia	Inactive	
Eta Iota	1962–1977	University of Arizona	Tucson	Arizona	Inactive	
**Kappa Alpha**	1962	Mississippi State University	Starkville	Mississippi	Active	
**Alpha Psi**	1962	Southeastern Louisiana University	Hammond	Louisiana	Active	
Delta Pi	1962–1997	Western Michigan University	Kalamazoo	Michigan	Inactive	
Delta Rho	1964–1970	University of Steubenville	Steubenville	Ohio	Inactive	(Note: This chapter originated as Pi Epsilon Delta (local) in 1953.)
Delta Sigma	1964–1973	Marquette University	Milwaukee	Wisconsin	Inactive	(Note: This chapter originated as Iota Chi Omega (local) in 1953.)
**Gamma Lambda**	1964–2002; 2007	University of North Carolina	Chapel Hill	North Carolina	Active	
**Delta Tau**	1965	Western Kentucky University	Bowling Green	Kentucky	Active	(Note: This chapter originated as the En Ami (in friendship) Club (local) in 1937.)
**Kappa Beta**	1965	Valdosta State University	Valdosta	Georgia	Active	
Delta Upsilon	1965–1972	Loyola University Chicago	Chicago	Illinois	Inactive	(Note: This chapter originated as Delta Zeta Chi (local) in 1959.)
**Kappa Gamma**	1965	Troy University	Troy	Alabama	Active	(Note: This chapter originated as Alpha Phi Mu (local) in 1964.)
Beta Chi	1966–1993	Fairmont State University	Fairmont	West Virginia	Inactive	(Note: This chapter originated as Gamma Chi Chi (local) in 1926.)
Kappa Delta	1966–2000	Athens State University	Athens	Alabama	Inactive	(Note: This chapter originated as Phi Kappa Mu (local) in 1965.)
Beta Phi	1966–2013	Marshall University	Huntington	West Virginia	Inactive	
**Kappa Epsilon**	1966	Delta State University	Cleveland	Mississippi	Active	
Kappa Zeta	February 4, 1967–2013	Barton College	Wilson	North Carolina	Inactive	(Note: This chapter originated as Sigma Tau Chi (local) in 1920.)
**Kappa Eta**	1967	Nicholls State University	Thibodaux	Louisiana	Active	
Epsilon Zeta	1967–1999	University of Texas at Arlington	Arlington	Texas	Inactive	(Note: This chapter originated as the Koshari Club (local) in 1939.)
Eta Kappa	1967–1976	California State Polytechnic University, Humboldt (Note: This school's name changed from Humboldt State University in early 2022.)	Arcata	California	Inactive	(Note: This chapter originated as Beta Chi Omega (local) in _____.)
Eta Lambda	1967–1974	University of Nevada, Las Vegas	Paradise	Nevada	Inactive	(Note: This chapter originated as Nu Sigma Upsilon (local) in 1958.)
**Kappa Iota**	1968	Northwestern State University	Natchitoches	Louisiana	Active	
Kappa Theta	1968–1978	Tennessee Wesleyan University	Athens	Tennessee	Inactive	
**Kappa Mu**	1968	Georgia Southern University	Statesboro	Georgia	Active	(Note: This chapter originated as Theta Pi Omega (local) in 1964.)
Delta Phi	March 23, 1968–2012	Ashland University	Ashland	Ohio	Inactive	(Note: This chapter originated as Lambda Pi Omega (local) in 1965.)
Zeta Nu	1968–1978; 1993–2010 ?	University of Wisconsin–Oshkosh	Oshkosh	Wisconsin	Inactive	(Note: This chapter originated as the Philomathean Society (local) in 1966. At its 1993 re-establishment it absorbed Alpha Omega Psi (local), formed in 1990.)
**Gamma Mu**	1968	Western Carolina University	Cullowhee	North Carolina	Active	(Note: This chapter originated as Epsilon Sigma Phi (local) in 1966.)
**Gamma Kappa**	1968–1974; 1991	University of North Carolina Wilmington	Wilmington	North Carolina	Active	(Note: This chapter originated as Chi Sigma Phi (local) in 1966.)
**Kappa Xi**	1969	University of West Alabama	Livingston	Alabama	Active	(Note: This chapter originated as Tau Omega Pi (local) in 1939.)
Kappa Nu	1969–2009	Lambuth University	Jackson	Tennessee	Inactive	(Note: Lambuth University ceased operations in 2011; the chapter closed about two years prior to that institution's demise. The campus is now used by the University of Memphis as a satellite campus, but the two schools have no continuing relationship.)
**Kappa Omega**	1969	University of South Alabama	Mobile	Alabama	Active	(Note: This chapter originated as Kappa Omega (local) in 1964.)
Zeta Mu	April 12, 1969–1978	Wayne State University	Detroit	Michigan	Inactive	
**Delta Eta**	1969	Georgetown College	Georgetown	Kentucky	Active	(Note: This chapter originated as Theta Sigma Nu (local) in 1967.)
Epsilon Eta	1969–1976	Sul Ross State University	Alpine	Texas	Inactive	
**Kappa Pi**	1969	Tennessee Tech	Cookeville	Tennessee	Active	(Note: This chapter originated as Alpha Gamma Phi (local) in 1967.)
Kappa Omicron	1969–1998; 2014–2023	Georgia Southern University–Armstrong Campus	Savannah	Georgia	Inactive	(Note: This chapter originated as Delta Chi (local) in 1936.)
**Kappa Rho**	1970–1975; 2013	Florida Atlantic University	Boca Raton	Florida	Active	
**Kappa Sigma**	1970	Jacksonville State University	Jacksonville	Alabama	Active	
Zeta Pi	1970–1987; 1996–2009	Missouri Western State University	St. Joseph	Missouri	Inactive	(Note: At its 1996 restoration it absorbed Kappa Delta Sigma (local), which had formed in 1995.)
**Gamma Rho**	February 27, 1971	University of West Georgia	Carrollton	Georgia	Active	(Note: This chapter originated as Alpha Phi Rho (local) in 1968.)
**Kappa Tau**	March 6, 1971	Lander University	Greenwood	South Carolina	Active	(Note: This chapter originated as Kappa Phi Delta (local or regional?) in 1969.)
**Kappa Phi**	1971	LaGrange College	LaGrange	Georgia	Active	(Note: This chapter originated as Kappa Phi Delta (local or regional?) in 1921.)
**Gamma Nu**	1971	Elon University	Elon	North Carolina	Active	(Note: This chapter originated as Pi Kappa Tau (local) in 1924.)
Zeta Omicron	1971–1974	Missouri State University	Springfield	Missouri	Inactive	
**Kappa Chi**	1972	University of Montevallo	Montevallo	Alabama	Active	(Note: This chapter originated as Phi Kappa Lambda (local) in 196x ?)
Beta Psi	1972–2011	University of Southern Maine	Gorham	Maine	Inactive	(Note: This chapter originated as Zeta Chi Epsilon (local) in 1967.)
Beta Omega	1972–1974	Robert Morris University	Moon Township	Pennsylvania	Inactive	(Note: This chapter originated as Theta Sigma Chi (local) in ____.)
Gamma Xi	1972–1985	Old Dominion University	Norfolk	Virginia	Inactive	(Note: This chapter originated as Gamma Nu (local) in 1969.)
Gamma Omicron	April 30, 1972–1997	George Mason University	Fairfax County	Virginia	Inactive	(Note: This chapter originated as the SAGE Club (local) in ____.)
Epsilon Theta	1972–1995	Texas Wesleyan University	Fort Worth	Texas	Inactive	(Note: This chapter originated as the Entre Amis (between friends) Club (local) in 1943.)
**Kappa Upsilon**	1973	University of North Georgia	Dahlonega	Georgia	Active	(Note: This chapter originated as Sigma Lambda Phi (local) in 1970.)
Gamma Pi	1973–2000	Virginia Tech	Blacksburg	Virginia	Inactive	
Kappa Psi	1973–1987	University of West Florida	Pensacola	Florida	Inactive	(Note: This chapter originated as Phi Sigma Chi (local) in 1970.)
**Theta Alpha**	1973	University of North Alabama	Florence	Alabama	Active	
Delta Chi	1973–1990	Eastern Kentucky University	Richmond	Kentucky	Inactive	(Note: This chapter originated as Phi Mu Phi (local) in 1971.)
Delta Psi	1973–2000	Wright State University	Fairborn	Ohio	Inactive	
**Gamma Sigma**	1973	Georgia College & State University	Milledgeville	Georgia	Active	
Eta Mu	1974–1992	University of California, Davis	Davis	California	Inactive	
Gamma Upsilon	1974–1982	Francis Marion University	Florence	South Carolina	Inactive	(Note: This chapter originated as Sigma Delta Alpha (local) in 1973.)
Zeta Rho	1975–1990	University of Wisconsin–La Crosse	La Crosse	Wisconsin	Inactive	
Epsilon Kappa	1975–1981	Texas A&M University	College Station	Texas	Inactive	
**Beta Eta**	1976–1995; 2004	Miami University	Oxford	Ohio	Active	
**Epsilon Lambda**	1977–2000; 2007	Arkansas Tech University	Russellville	Arkansas	Active	(Note: This chapter originated as the Marquisse Club (local) in 1965. At its 2007 restoration it absorbed Theta Omega Chi (local), formed in 2004.)
**Epsilon Mu**	1978	Houston Christian University	Houston	Texas	Active	(Note: Formerly Houston Baptist University, the school announced a name change to Houston Christian in September, 2022.)
**Epsilon Nu**	1979	Oklahoma State University	Stillwater	Oklahoma	Active	
Gamma Chi	1981–2010	University of North Carolina at Greensboro	Greensboro	North Carolina	Inactive	
Gamma Omega	1981–2007	University of Virginia	Charlottesville	Virginia	Inactive	(Note: This chapter originated as Phi Sigma (local) in 1980.)
Lambda Alpha	1982–2009	Randolph–Macon College	Ashland	Virginia	Inactive	
**Gamma Tau**	1982	Johns Hopkins University	Baltimore	Maryland	Active	
Lambda Beta	1983–2020	Appalachian State University	Boone	North Carolina	Inactive	
Beta Iota	1984–2001	Clarkson University	Potsdam (village)	New York	Inactive	
**Epsilon Xi**	1984	Louisiana State University	Shreveport	Louisiana	Active	
Beta Omicron	1984–1990	University of Massachusetts	Amherst	Massachusetts	Inactive	
**Rho Delta**	1985	Central Michigan University	Mount Pleasant	Michigan	Active	(Note: This chapter originated as Delta Rho (local) in 1981.)
**Delta Omega**	1985	Case Western Reserve University	Cleveland	Ohio	Active	(Note: This chapter originated as Delta Phi Upsilon (local) in 1893.)
**Phi Beta**	1986	Albright College	Reading	Pennsylvania	Active	(Note: This chapter originated as Phi Beta Mu (local) in 1900.)
**Theta Delta**	1987	Spring Hill College	Mobile	Alabama	Active	(Note: This chapter originated as Delta Phi Delta (local) in 1967.)
**Theta Beta**	1987	Georgia State University	Atlanta	Georgia	Active	
**Theta Gamma**	1988	Florida International University	University Park	Florida	Active	
**Theta Zeta**	1989	Georgia Tech	Atlanta	Georgia	Active	
**Phi Alpha**	1989	McDaniel College	Westminster	Maryland	Active	(Note: This chapter originated as Delta Sigma Kappa (local) in 1923.)
Rho Beta	1989–2023	University of Michigan–Dearborn	Dearborn	Michigan	Inactive	(Note: This chapter originated as Kappa Gamma Beta (local) in 1987.)
**Rho Alpha**	1989	IUPUI	Indianapolis	Indiana	Active	
**Theta Epsilon**	1989	Kennesaw State University	Marietta	Georgia	Active	
**Phi Gamma**	1989	University of Maryland, Baltimore County	Catonsville	Maryland	Active	(Note: This chapter originated as Kappa Delta Alpha (local) in 1986.)
**Phi Delta**	1989	Salisbury University	Salisbury	Maryland	Active	
Lambda Gamma	1989 – March 11, 2024	Virginia Commonwealth University	Richmond	Virginia	Inactive	(Note: This chapter originated as Omega Delta Epsilon (local) in 198x ? The national office suspended the chapter in March 2024. The university suspended the fraternity from April 5, 2024, until May 2028.)
Phi Epsilon	1989–1998	Widener University	Chester	Pennsylvania	Inactive	(Note: This chapter originated as Sigma Iota Chi at Brandywine Junior College in 1966.)
**Zeta Sigma**	1989	University of Wisconsin–River Falls	River Falls	Wisconsin	Active	(Note: This chapter originated as the W.I.S.H. Club (local) in 1987.)
**Lambda Delta**	1990–1994; 2003	University of South Carolina Aiken	Aiken	South Carolina	Active	(Note: At its 2003 restoration it absorbed Delta Zeta Chi (local), formed in 1995.)
**Rho Gamma**	1990	Ball State University	Muncie	Indiana	Active	(Note: This chapter originated as Lambda Phi Gamma (local) in 1989.)
Rho Epsilon	1990–2010	Albion College	Albion	Michigan	Inactive	
**Lambda Epsilon**	1991	Christopher Newport University	Newport News	Virginia	Active	
Phi Iota	1991–2000	Frostburg State University	Frostburg	Maryland	Inactive	(Note: This chapter originated as Kappa Tau Epsilon (local) in 1987.)
**Epsilon Omicron**	1991	Southern Arkansas University	Magnolia	Arkansas	Active	(Note: This chapter originated as Phi Delta Gamma (local) in 1985.)
**Phi Eta**	1991	York College	Spring Garden Township	Pennsylvania	Active	(Note: This chapter originated as Zeta Delta Phi (local) in 1982.)
**Psi Beta**	1991	University of Hartford	West Hartford	Connecticut	Active	(Note: This chapter originated as Beta (local) earlier in 1991.)
**Phi Kappa**	1992	Muhlenberg College	Allentown	Pennsylvania	Active	
**Phi Theta**	1992	Towson University	Towson	Maryland	Active	(Note: This chapter originated as Alpha Beta Chi (local) in 1989.)
**Lambda Zeta**	1993	University of South Carolina Upstate	Valley Falls	South Carolina	Active	(Note: This chapter originated as Sigma Delta Psi (local) in 1987.)
Zeta Upsilon	1993–2002	Loras College	Dubuque	Iowa	Inactive	
**Epsilon Rho**	1993	Lyon College	Batesville	Arkansas	Active	(Note: This chapter originated as Zeta Omega (local) in 1988.)
Zeta Tau	1994-199?	University of Wisconsin-Green Bay	Green Bay	Wisconsin	Inactive	
Theta Eta	1994–1997	Saint Leo University	St. Leo	Florida	Inactive	(Note: This chapter originated as Alpha Sigma (local) in 1963.)
**Epsilon Pi**	1994	Tarleton State University	Stephenville	Texas	Active	
**Rho Zeta**	1998	Bellarmine University	Louisville	Kentucky	Active	
Lambda Eta	1998–2013	Wake Forest University	Winston-Salem	North Carolina	Inactive	(Note: This chapter originated as Alpha Sigma (local) in 1963.)
**Epsilon Sigma**	1999	University of Texas at San Antonio	San Antonio	Texas	Active	
**Theta Theta**	2000	Columbus State University	Columbus	Georgia	Active	(Note: This chapter originated as Phi Mu Kappa (local) in 1997.)
Phi Lambda	2000–2016	West Chester University	West Chester	Pennsylvania	Inactive	
**Theta Kappa**	2008	Huntingdon College	Montgomery	Alabama	Active	
**Rho Eta**	2008	Grand Valley State University	Allendale Charter Township	Michigan	Active	
**Rho Theta**	2009	Elmhurst University	Elmhurst	Illinois	Active	(Note: On July 1, 2020 Elmhurst college changed its name to Elmhurst University.) (Note: This chapter originated as Gamma Chi (local) in 1989.)
**Lambda Theta**	2009	University of South Carolina	Columbia	South Carolina	Active	
**Rho Iota**	2011	University of Kentucky	Lexington	Kentucky	Active	
**Eta Nu**	2012	California State University, Northridge	Northridge, Los Angeles	California	Active	
**Theta Nu**	2012	Florida Gulf Coast University	Fort Myers	Florida	Active	
**Epsilon Epsilon**	2013	Oklahoma City University	Oklahoma City	Oklahoma	Active	
**Lambda Iota**	2013	East Carolina University	Greenville	North Carolina	Active	
**Rho Mu**	2014	DePaul University	Chicago	Illinois	Active	
**Rho Lambda**	2014	Cleveland State University	Cleveland	Ohio	Active	(Note: This chapter originated as Gamma Phi Delta (local) in 2002.)
**Phi Nu**	2014	Rutgers University	New Brunswick	New Jersey	Active	
**Rho Kappa**	2014	Kent State University	Kent	Ohio	Active	
Phi Xi	2014–2021	Cornell University	Ithaca	New York	Inactive	
**Phi Omicron**	2015	La Salle University	Philadelphia	Pennsylvania	Active	
**Psi Gamma**	2015	Binghamton University (SUNY)	Binghamton	New York	Active	
**Eta Xi**	2015	California State University, Stanislaus	Turlock	California	Active	
**Iota Alpha**	2015	University of Hawaiʻi at Mānoa	Manoa, Honolulu	Hawaii	Active	
**Eta Rho**	2016	California State University, Sacramento	Sacramento	California	Active	
**Lambda Kappa**	2016	University of South Carolina Beaufort	Beaufort ?	South Carolina	Active	
**Eta Sigma**	2016	University of California, Merced	Merced	California	Active	
**Zeta Zeta**	2016	Saint Louis University	St. Louis	Missouri	Active	
**Epsilon Iota**	2016	Texas Christian University	Fort Worth	Texas	Active	
**Rho Nu**	2016	Northern Kentucky University	Highland Heights	Kentucky	Active	
Xi Alpha	2018–2023	University of Colorado Boulder	Boulder	Colorado	Inactive	
**Xi Beta**	2018	Colorado State University	Fort Collins	Colorado	Active	
**Psi Delta**	2019	Pace University	New York City	New York	Active	
**Phi Pi**	2020	Stevenson University	Stevenson	Maryland	Active	
**Xi Gamma**	2021	Boise State University	Boise	Idaho	Active	
**Theta Iota**	April 12, 2025	Middle Georgia State University	Macon	Georgia	Active	
