= Elizabeth T. Clement =

American judge (born 1977)

Beth Clement

Chief Justice of the Michigan Supreme Court
- In office November 22, 2022 – April 14, 2025
- Preceded by: Bridget Mary McCormack
- Succeeded by: Megan Cavanagh

Justice of the Michigan Supreme Court
- In office November 17, 2017 – April 14, 2025
- Appointed by: Rick Snyder
- Preceded by: Joan Larsen
- Succeeded by: Noah Hood

Personal details
- Born: Elizabeth Ann Tripp; October 8, 1977 (age 49)
- Party: Republican
- Spouse: Thomas Clement
- Children: 4
- Education: Michigan State University (BA, JD)

Elizabeth Ann "Beth" Tripp Clement (born October 8, 1977) is an American lawyer who served as the chief justice of the Michigan Supreme Court from 2022 to 2025. She served as an associate justice of the Michigan Supreme Court beginning 2017, after being appointed by Governor Rick Snyder. She was elected as chief justice in 2022, succeeding Bridget Mary McCormack. In 2025, she announced she was leaving the Michigan Supreme Court to lead the National Center for State Courts.

== Biography ==
Clement graduated from Michigan State University in 1999 with a Bachelor of Arts degree in political science, and she earned her Juris Doctor from the Michigan State University College of Law in 2002. She owned and operated a private firm, Clement Law, PLLC, from 2002 to 2006, where she represented individuals and businesses primarily in the areas of family law, adoption, probate, estate planning, and criminal law.

== Career ==
=== Legislative ===
Clement served in both legislative and executive branches of the Michigan government before being appointed to the bench. Before opening her own firm, Clement served as a legislative aide to State Senate Majority Floor Leader Mike Rogers and a policy advisor and legal counsel to state Senate Majority Leader Mike Bishop from 2006 through 2010.

In 2011, Clement joined the administration of Michigan's new governor, Rick Snyder, as deputy legal counsel. In 2014, Clement was promoted to deputy chief of staff and added the position of Snyder's cabinet secretary in 2015. She was promoted to Snyder's chief legal counsel in a staff shakeup by Snyder amidst the Flint water crisis in April 2016.

=== Judicial ===
On November 1, 2017, Justice Joan Larsen was confirmed by the United States Senate to serve as a judge on the United States Court of Appeals for the Sixth Circuit. Larsen resigned from the Michigan Supreme Court soon after and received her commission on November 8, 2017. Clement was first mentioned as a potential candidate by the Gongwer News Service on November 1, 2017, and Clement's appointment was leaked to the press on November 15, 2017. Snyder formally appointed Clement to the Michigan Supreme Court on November 17, 2017. Clement is the third woman to serve in this seat on the Court during its eight-year term that was last up for election in 2010. Mary Beth Kelly was elected in November 2010, but announced her resignation from the Court in August 2015, to return to private practice effective October 1, 2015. Following Larsen's appointment by Snyder in October 2015, Larsen was elected to fill the remaining two years of Kelly's term in November 2016. After Larsen's resignation Clement served 12 months of the final 14 months of the term before she was elected to a full eight-year term in November 2018.

Early in her tenure on the court, Clement faced backlash from conservative activists over her being one of two Snyder appointees (along with Justice David Viviano) to join the Court's two Democratic justices to allow a proposal that would create an independent commission to draw the state's Congressional boundaries to proceed to the November ballot.

There was speculation that the Michigan Republican Party might have not endorsed Clement or nominated another candidate in her place. (Though candidates for the Michigan Supreme Court run on the non-partisan section of the ballot, the major two political parties nominate candidates for each seat) Clement was booed at the Michigan Republican Convention in August 2018 when her name was brought up for nomination for a full term, but she was nominated for a full term along with fellow incumbent Justice Kurtis T. Wilder. Clement later said she faced "bullying" and unusual "outside pressure" to vote to keep the redistricting proposal off the ballot. Clement's name and picture were even kept off literature distributed by volunteers before the 2018 mid-term elections, a decision a Michigan GOP spokesman said was driven by the fact that some volunteers felt uncomfortable supporting Clement. Despite this opposition, Clement was the only person nominated by the Michigan Republican Party to win a statewide election in 2018.

In February 2025, Clement announced her intent to resign from the court by the end of April.

== Personal life ==
Clement resides in East Lansing, Michigan with her husband and four children. Her husband, Thomas P. Clement, has previously served as general counsel to the Michigan Supreme Court before leaving to serve as Vice President of Operations and General Counsel at Michigan Retailers Association and Retailers Insurance Company.

== Electoral history ==
Michigan Supreme Court election, 2018
Party	Candidate	Votes	%
Non-partisan	Elizabeth T. Clement (incumbent)	1,871,462	29.88
Non-partisan	Megan Cavanagh	1,584,512	25.3
Non-partisan	Kurtis T. Wilder (incumbent)	1,519,394	24.26
Non-partisan	Samuel Bagenstos	717,062	11.45
Non-partisan	Kerry Lee Morgan	360,858	5.76
Non-partisan	Doug Dern	209,103	3.34

== See also ==
- List of justices of the Michigan Supreme Court

Legal offices
Preceded by Joan Larsen	Justice of the Michigan Supreme Court; 2017–2025	Succeeded by Noah Hood
Preceded by Bridget McCormack	Chief Justice of the Michigan Supreme Court; 2022–2025	Succeeded by Megan Cavanagh
