= Women Who Weld =

Nonprofit organization

Women Who Weld is a nonprofit organization based in Detroit, Michigan. Women Who Weld teaches women how to weld and find employment in the welding industry through intensive and introductory welding training programs, including Week-Long Intensive Welding Training Classes and Single-Day Introductory Workshops.

== Information ==
Women Who Weld was founded by Samantha Farrugia, who learned how to weld while attending the University of Michigan for her master's degree in the Taubman College of Architecture and Urban Planning.

The organization has been featured in The Atlantic, Architectural Digest, the Detroit Free Press, the Record-Eagle, InStyle Magazine, and more.
