= Megan Cavanagh =

Megan Cavanagh may refer to:

- Megan Cavanagh (actress)
- Megan Cavanagh (judge)
