= 2010 Michigan Proposal 2 =

Proposal 2
- Proposed constitutional amendment to ban certain felons from holding elective office and some other public positions.

Results
| Choice | Votes | % |
|---|---|---|
| Yes | 2,270,657 | 74.91% |
| No | 760,586 | 25.09% |
| Total votes | 3,031,243 | 100.00% |
County results
Yes
80–90%
70–80%
60–70%

2010 Michigan Proposal 2, also known as the Prohibition of Certain Felons Holding Certain Offices Amendment, was a proposed legislatively referred constitutional amendment in the U.S. state of Michigan. It was intended to ban certain felons from being elected to certain public office positions as well as banning them from holding certain public jobs. It passed in the November 2010 Michigan elections. The Traverse City Record-Eagle published an article in support of the proposal.

== Result ==
| Result | Votes | Percentage |
|---|---|---|
| Yes | 2,270,657 | 74.91 |
| No | 760,586 | 25.09 |
