= Conrad L. Mallett Jr. =

American judge (born 1953)

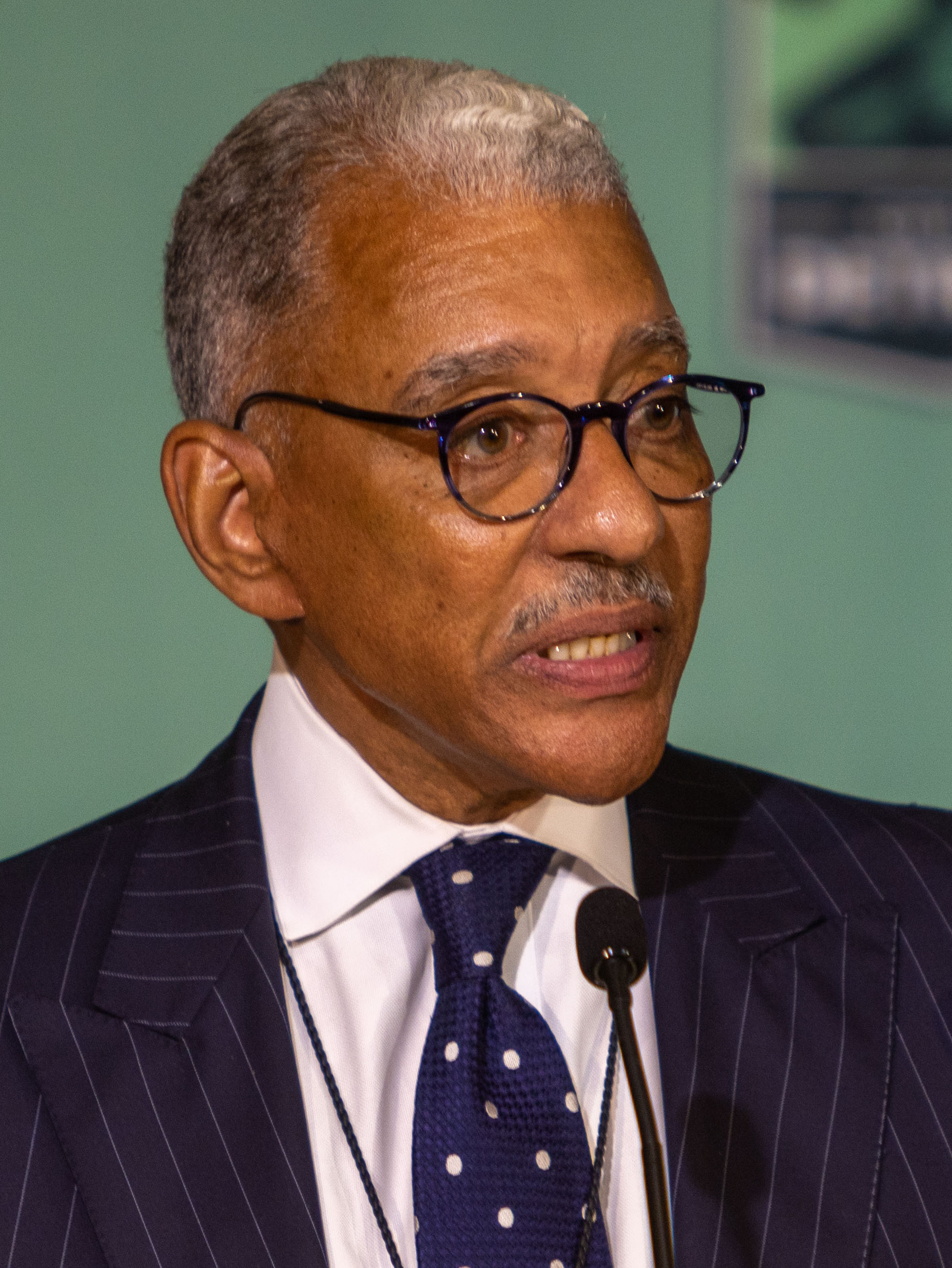
- Mallett in 2022

Corporation Counsel of Detroit
- Incumbent
- Assumed office April 26, 2022
- Mayor: Mike Duggan

Deputy Mayor of Detroit
- In office May 25, 2020 – April 26, 2022
- Mayor: Mike Duggan

Chief Justice of the Michigan Supreme Court
- In office 1997–1998
- Preceded by: James H. Brickley
- Succeeded by: Elizabeth Weaver

Justice of the Michigan Supreme Court
- In office 1990–1999
- Preceded by: Dennis Archer
- Succeeded by: Robert P. Young Jr.

Personal details
- Born: October 12, 1953 (age 72)

Conrad Leroy Mallett Jr. (born October 12, 1953) is a Michigan jurist and businessman who currently serves as corporation counsel for the city of Detroit. Prior to being approved by Detroit City Council as corporation counsel, Mallett was deputy mayor of the city under Mayor Mike Duggan. He previously was a justice of the Michigan Supreme Court from 1990 to 1999 and served as chief justice in 1997 and 1998.

== Biography ==
Mallett was born to Dr. Conrad L. Mallett Sr., Ed.D and Dr. Claudia Gwendolyn Jones Mallett, Ed.D in Detroit, Michigan, among three children. His sister is Veronica Mallett, the chief administrative officer of the More in Common Alliance (MICA).

Mallett served as a Justice on the Michigan Supreme Court from December 21, 1990, to January 2, 1999, acting as chief justice in 1997 and 1998. Mallett was the first African American to serve as chief justice on the Michigan Supreme Court.

Mallett also sat on the Board of Directors of Lear Corporation, For twenty years, Mallett was a top Detroit Medical Center (DMC) administrator. served as president of DMC's Sinai-Grace Hospital from 2003 to 2011, and acted as interim CEO of DMC Huron Valley-Sinai Hospital in 2017. He also previously served as a partner at the Detroit law firm Miller Canfield.

Mallet was appointed deputy mayor of Detroit in May 2020. He assumed the office on May 25, 2020. He was involved with leading the city's response to the COVID-19 pandemic. Mallett was named corporation counsel for the City of Detroit in 2022. After he had been first nominated, members of the Detroit City Council expressed concerns about Mallett and his nomination was initially withdrawn. After a search produced no alternate candidate for the position, he was renominated. After several months of divided debate about his nomination, his appointment was confirmed on April 26, 2022.

=== Suppression of police officer discipline records ===
Following Mallett's appointment as Detroit's corporation counsel, the city began redacting police officers' disciplinary records requested under the Freedom of Information Act. Previously, the city had disclosed officer discipline files in full. As corporation counsel, Mallett heads the city's law department, which processes FOIA requests.

Ross Jones, an investigative reporter with WXYZ, reported that the city denies FOIA requests for officer discipline records by citing the Bullard-Plawecki Employee Right to Know Act, saying that the act prohibits the release of discipline records older than four years. However, attorneys questioned the city's policy, noting that the Right-to-Know Act itself states that it "shall not be construed to diminish a right of access to records" provided under FOIA.

Mallett defended the city's policy in an interview with WXYZ. The policy was criticized by longtime Detroit police commissioner Willie Bell, activist Tristan Taylor, and multiple employment law attorneys. WXYZ has appealed the city's decision to redact records that its newsroom had requested.

== Personal life ==
Mallett is Catholic.

Political offices
Preceded by Dennis Archer	Justice of the Michigan Supreme Court; 1990–1999	Succeeded by Robert P. Young Jr.
Preceded by James H. Brickley	Chief Justice of the Michigan Supreme Court; 1997–1998	Succeeded by Elizabeth Weaver
