= Jerome Cavanagh =

American politician (1928–1979)

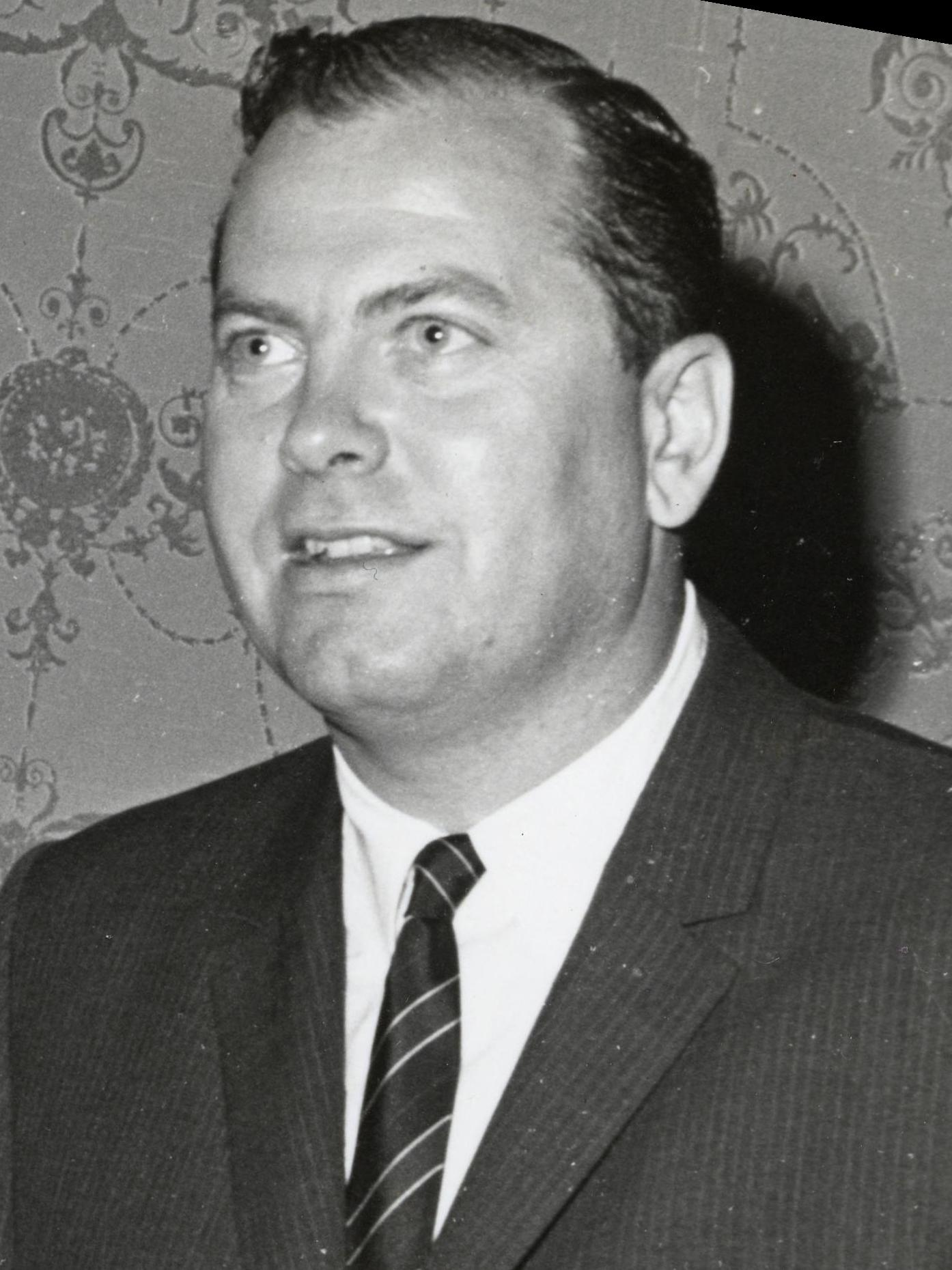
- Cavanagh in the 1960s

64th Mayor of Detroit
- In office January 2, 1962 – January 5, 1970
- Preceded by: Louis Miriani
- Succeeded by: Roman Gribbs

24th President of the United States Conference of Mayors
- In office 1966–1967
- Preceded by: Neal Blaisdell
- Succeeded by: Joseph M. Barr

39th President of the National League of Cities
- In office 1966
- Preceded by: Henry Maier
- Succeeded by: Harold M. Tollefson

Personal details
- Born: Jerome Patrick Cavanagh; June 16, 1928 Detroit, Michigan, U.S.
- Died: November 27, 1979 (aged 51) Lexington, Kentucky, U.S.
- Resting place: Mount Elliot Cemetery; Detroit, Michigan
- Party: Democratic
- Spouse: Mary Helen Martin
- Relations: Michael Cavanagh (brother) Megan Cavanagh (niece)
- Children: 8, including Phil

Jerome Patrick Cavanagh (June 16, 1928 – November 27, 1979) was an American politician who served as the 64th mayor of Detroit, Michigan from 1962 to 1970. Initially a popular figure, his reputation was seriously damaged by the city's 1967 riots, the most destructive of any U.S. city that decade. He was the first mayor to reside at the Manoogian Mansion, donated to the city by the industrial baron Alex Manoogian.

== Early life and family ==
Jerome P. Cavanagh was born on June 16, 1928, in Detroit, the son of Mary Irene (Timmins) and Sylvester J. Cavanaugh, a boilermaker at Ford Motor Company. He attended the University of Detroit, earning an undergraduate degree in 1950 and a law degree in 1954, and practiced law in Detroit after graduation. He was active in Democratic Party politics while attending school, and afterward served in low-level appointed positions as an administrative assistant at the Michigan State Fair Authority and as a member of the Metropolitan Airport Board of Zoning Appeals. Cavanagh was a Roman Catholic. He is the brother of Mike Cavanagh, a former Justice of the Michigan Supreme Court (1983–2014) and father of eight children, among whom are Mark Jerome Cavanagh, since 1989 a judge on the Michigan Court of Appeals, David Peter Cavanagh and Christopher Francis Cavanagh (both former Wayne County Commissioners), and Phil Cavanagh (a former member of the Michigan House of Representatives).

== 1961 mayoral campaign ==
In his first campaign ever, the 33-year-old Cavanagh entered the 1961 Detroit mayoral race, as one of eleven candidates in the nonpartisan primary opposing incumbent Louis Miriani. None of these candidates was seen as serious opposition to Miriani, who had an enormous amount of institutional support and had easily won the mayoral race four years earlier. Cavanagh ran second to Miriani in the primary, earning a slot in the general election, but received fewer than half the primary votes Miriani did. However, Cavanagh campaigned relentlessly, criticizing Miriani's handling of Detroit's financial affairs and race relations with the city's African-American community. Many in the black community believed Miriani condoned police brutality. On election day, black voters turned out in force, and Cavanagh stunned political observers by defeating the incumbent Miriani.

== Mayoralty ==
Cavanagh got off to a popular start as mayor, appointing a reformer to be chief of police and implementing an affirmative action program for most city agencies. Unlike Richard J. Daley, who resisted forced implementation of the American civil rights movement, Cavanagh welcomed Martin Luther King Jr. to Detroit, and marched with him in June 1963 down Woodward Avenue in the 100,000 strong Detroit Walk to Freedom.

Cavanagh was successful in receiving money from the U.S. federal government through the Model Cities Program. New skyscrapers were built downtown. The Model Cities Program was a key component of President Lyndon B. Johnson's Great Society and War on Poverty. Begun in 1966, it operated five-year-long experiments in 150 cities to develop new antipoverty programs and alternative forms of municipal government. The ambitious federal urban aid program succeeded in fostering a new generation of mostly black urban leaders. Detroit was one of the largest Model Cities projects. Mayor Cavanagh was the only elected official to serve on Johnson's task force. Detroit received widespread acclaim for its leadership in the program, which used $490 million to try to turn a nine-square-mile section of the city (with 134,000 inhabitants) into a model city. The city's political and business elite, and city planners, along with the black middle class, wanted federal funding to assist the economic growth of the entire city. They sought to protect the central business district property values from nearby slums and to construct new revenue-generating structures. However local community organizers and civil rights activists rallied poor residents in opposition to these plans. They said federal renewal funding should be used to replace deteriorating housing stock, whether with new public housing or low-cost housing built by private developers. The Model City program was terminated in Detroit and nationwide in 1974 after major race riots in most of its target cities.

Observers believed that Detroit had extinguished the embers of resentment left over from the 1943 Detroit Race Riot.

For example, Fortune magazine commented:

the most significant is the progress Detroit has made in race relations. The grim specter of the 1943 riots never quite fades from the minds of city leaders. As much as anything else, that specter has enabled the power structure to overcome tenacious prejudice and give the Negro community a role in the consensus probably unparalleled in any major American city. Negroes in Detroit have deep roots in the community, compared with the more transient population of Negro ghettos in Harlem and elsewhere in the North. ... more than 40% of the negro population own their own houses.

The economy of the city also seemed in generally good health. The National Observer commented:

The evidence, both statistical and visual, is everywhere. Retail sales are up dramatically. Earnings are higher. Unemployment is lower. People are putting new aluminum sidings on their homes, new carpets on the floor, new cars in the garage.

Some people are forsaking the suburbs and returning to the city. Physically Detroit has acquired freshness and vitality. Acres of slums have been razed, and steel and glass apartments, angular and lonely in the vacated landscape, have sprung up in their place. In the central business district, hard by the Detroit River, severely rectangular skyscrapers—none more than 5 years old—jostle uncomfortably with the gilded behemoths of another age.

Accustomed to years of adversity, to decades of drabness and civil immobility, Detroiters are naturally exhilarated. They note with particular pride that Detroit has been removed from the Federal Bureau of Employment Security's classification of 'an area with substantial and persistent unemployment.'

Buoyed by this optimism, Cavanagh was reelected overwhelmingly in 1965. In 1966, Cavanagh was elected president of both the United States Conference of Mayors and the National League of Cities, the only mayor to hold both posts at the same time. He served as president of the United States Conference of Mayors until the following year.

=== 1967 riots ===
However, deeper problems existed under the surface. After World War II, the automobile industry, requiring more lateral space than was available in a city, and desiring to avoid city taxes, decentralized its operations. As with other cities, Detroiters were leaving Detroit for its suburbs by the thousands by 1967. Some 22,000 residents, mostly white, moved to the suburbs in 1966 alone, following new auto plants and new housing, or using the newly constructed Interstate system to commute into Detroit.

Detroit faced serious financial trouble. Cavanagh had inherited a $28 million budget gap in 1962. To close the gap, and to pay for the new programs he wanted to implement, Cavanagh had pushed through the legislature income and commuter taxes for Detroit, but these proved unpopular with residents and businesses.

On July 23, 1967, a police attempt to break up an illegal party escalated into what would be known as the 12th Street Riot. Feeling a large police presence would make things worse, Cavanagh acted slowly to stop the riots. Late Sunday afternoon, Cavanagh and city officials met at the 10th precinct with black community leaders and neighborhood activists. When asked why it took so long to call in the guard, Cavanagh replied "because they're all white. Were leery about that." Rioting lasted for five days, killed 43 people, left over 5,000 people homeless, and required two divisions of federal paratroopers to be put down; these would be the most destructive of the approximately 400 riots that American cities experienced in the 1960s. Cavanagh himself had to admit in July 1967, "Today we stand amidst the ashes of our hopes. We hoped against hope that what we had been doing was enough to prevent a riot. It was not enough."

The view that Detroit was a “Model City" led to the belief that it might not suffer the same race-related troubles of many other cities. The riots came as a complete shock to Cavanagh. He was, moreover, procedurally limited in his ability to control the riots as it was the role of Governor George Romney to ask for federal assistance once it appeared local resources might not be sufficient. By the time the National Guard had been called in, riots had already reached a massive scale. Cavanagh believed that a prompt federal response may very well have greatly reduced the severity of the riots. Cavanagh chose not to run for reelection in 1969.

== Later career ==
The latter part of Cavanagh's second term was also difficult for him personally. Cavanagh had run for the United States Senate in 1966 but lost in the Democratic primary to former governor G. Mennen Williams. In July 1967, Cavanagh's wife Mary Helen filed for separation, and the couple split the custody of their eight children. In October, Cavanagh counter-sued, and in 1968 the couple went through a contentious and public divorce.

After Cavanagh left office, he returned to his private law practice in Detroit and was also one of the first adjunct professors at the newly created Public Policy Department (later renamed The Gerald Ford Public Policy Institute) at the University of Michigan. In 1974, Cavanagh again ran for office, this time for Governor, but lost in the primary election to Democrat Sander Levin, who later lost in the general election to Republican William Milliken. It was Cavanagh's last attempt at political office.

Cavanagh died of a heart attack on November 27, 1979, at St. Joseph Hospital in Lexington, Kentucky, while visiting a client in that city. He was 51 years old. He is buried in Mt. Elliott Cemetery in Detroit.

Political offices
Preceded by Louis Miriani	Mayor of Detroit; 1962–1970	Succeeded by Roman Gribbs
