= Elizabeth Weaver =

American judge

64th Chief Justice of the Michigan Supreme Court
- In office 1999–2001
- Preceded by: Conrad L. Mallett Jr.
- Succeeded by: Maura D. Corrigan

Justice of the Michigan Supreme Court
- In office 1995–2010
- Governor: John Engler; Jennifer Granholm
- Preceded by: Robert P. Griffin
- Succeeded by: Alton Davis

Judge of the Michigan Court of Appeals
- In office 1987–1995

Personal details
- Born: March 28, 1941 New Orleans, Louisiana, U.S.
- Died: April 21, 2015 (aged 74) Glen Arbor Township, Michigan, U.S.
- Education: Tulane University Law School

Elizabeth Ann Weaver (March 28, 1941 – April 21, 2015) was a justice of the Michigan Supreme Court from 1995 to 2010 and chief justice from 1999 to 2001.

== Life ==
Weaver was born in New Orleans, Louisiana. She received her Bachelor of Arts degree in 1962 from H. Sophie Newcomb Memorial College. In 1965, she received her Juris Doctor from Tulane University Law School and was admitted to the Louisiana Bar. During law school, she was an editor of the Tulane Law Review. After graduating from Tulane, she began her practice working with the Chevron Corporation and a private law firm in New Orleans. She eventually relocated to Michigan, where she taught first grade and served as the dean of girls at The Leelanau School in Glen Arbor. In 1973, Weaver was admitted to the Michigan bar. In 1974, she was elected as Leelanau County's probate court judge. In 1987, she was elected to the Michigan Court of Appeals and was re-elected in 1992.

== Michigan Supreme Court ==
Weaver was elected to the Michigan Supreme Court as a Republican in 1994. She served as chief justice from 1999–2001 and was reelected to hear seat in 2002. In 2010, amidst rumors that the Michigan Republican Party would not formally nominate her for a third term, Weaver announced plans to run as an independent. Just days before both political parties were to formally nominate candidates for the statewide ballot in August 2010, however, she unexpectedly resigned from the court. Michigan's Democratic governor Jennifer Granholm replaced her with Alton Davis, who served out the rest of Weaver's term before being defeated in the 2010 election by Republican Mary Beth Kelly.

== Retirement ==
Weaver was a co-author of the 2013 book Judicial Deceit: Tyranny and Unnecessary Secrecy at the Michigan Supreme Court, a telling of the court during her tenure that she claimed was her last remaining obligation to the citizens of Michigan. Her contention was that the court had been overtaken in thought by appointees of Republican governor John Engler. She argued that, during her tenure, members of what she called the "Engler Four" had frequently attacked her, even using a gag order to silence her public comments about the court's internal deliberations despite her argument that the people had a right to know what was going on at the court.

Weaver died on April 21, 2015, in her Glen Arbor home. She was 74.
