= Alton Davis =

American judge

Associate Justice of the Michigan Supreme Court
- In office August 26, 2010 – January 1, 2011
- Appointed by: Jennifer Granholm
- Preceded by: Elizabeth Weaver
- Succeeded by: Mary Beth Kelly

Judge of Michigan Court of Appeals 4th District
- In office July 15, 2005 – August 26, 2010
- Appointed by: Jennifer Granholm
- Preceded by: Richard A. Griffin
- Succeeded by: Amy Ronanye Krause

Personal details
- Education: Western Michigan University (BA); Detroit College of Law (JD)

Alton Thomas Davis (born c. 1946-47) is an American prosecutor, jurist and former member of the Michigan Supreme Court.

== Legal career ==
Davis began his legal career as an assistant prosecuting attorney in Crawford County, Michigan and eventual served four years as the elected prosecutor. He then spent 21 years as a judge on the 46th Circuit Court, spending 17 years as chief judge. In July 2005, Davis was appointed to the 4th District of the Michigan Court of Appeals by Gov. Jennifer Granholm, replacing Judge Richard A. Griffin, who had been confirmed by the United States Senate to be a judge United States Court of Appeals for the Sixth Circuit. Davis was elected to finish the remainder of Griffin's term in 2006 and to a full term in 2008.

== Michigan Supreme Court Appointment ==
In 2010, amidst rumors that the Michigan Republican Party would not formally nominate her for a third term, Justice Elizabeth Weaver announced plans to run as an independent. Just days before both political parties were to formally nominate candidates for the statewide ballot, Weaver unexpectedly resigned from the court, allowing Granholm to appoint Davis as her replacement, serving the final four months of Weaver's term. The appointment of Davis gave Democratic-nominated or appointed justices a brief, but solid 4-3 majority on the Court after years being in the minority after appointments from former Gov. John Engler.

The first formal opinion from Davis was a dissenting opinion in Certified Question (Waeschle v Oakland Co Med Examiner), a case that involved whether the next of kin of a deceased person had the right to possess the brain of a dead relative if the brain had been detained by the county medical examiner in investigation of a crime.Waeschle v Oakland Co Med Examiner, 485 370, 401 (Mich October 29, 2010). Davis did not rule on the merits, instead saying he believed the Court should not have been involved in the case.

Davis was formally nominated for a full-term by the Michigan Democratic Party on August 29, 2010. He was defeated by Republican Mary Beth Kelly, despite prominent endorsements from high-profile labor unions.

Considered a friend of organized labor throughout his career, Davis was endorsed by the United Auto Workers, Michigan AFL-CIO, Michigan Nurses Association, Michigan Professional Firefighters Union, the Police Officers Association of Michigan Union and others. Before being appointed by Granholm to the Court, Davis worked as the Chairman of the Crawford County Democratic Party, was a Regional Coordinator for former Democratic Governor James Blanchard's first gubernatorial campaign and was a Blanchard appointee to the Michigan State Building Authority. Davis is also a member of the Michigan Trial Lawyers Association.

== Personal life ==
Alton Davis hails from Crawford County in Michigan's northern lower peninsula, and lives with his wife in Grayling, just south of the Mackinac Bridge. Davis has two grown daughters.

== Education ==
Davis holds degrees from North Central Michigan College, Western Michigan University. He earned his JD from the Detroit College of Law.

== Electoral history ==
Michigan Supreme Court election, 2010
Party	Candidate	Votes	%
Non-partisan	Mary Beth Kelly	1,408,294	29.94
Non-partisan	Robert P. Young Jr. (incumbent)	1,310,986	27.88
Non-partisan	Alton Davis (incumbent)	908,642	19.32
Non-partisan	Denise Langford Morris	812,485	17.28
Non-partisan	Bob Roddis	262,654	5.58
