= Michael Cavanagh (judge) =

American judge (1940–2025)

Michael F. Cavanagh
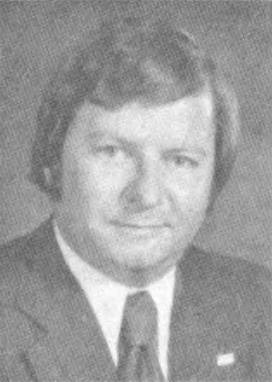
- Cavanagh in 1977

Associate Justice of the Michigan Supreme Court
- In office January 1, 1983 – January 1, 2015
- Succeeded by: Richard H. Bernstein

Chief Justice of the Michigan Supreme Court
- In office 1991–1995

Judge of the Michigan Court of Appeals
- In office 1975–1982

Judge of the Michigan 54-A District Court
- In office 1973–1975

Personal details
- Born: October 21, 1940 Lansing, Michigan, U.S.
- Died: May 20, 2025 (aged 84)
- Party: Democratic
- Spouse: Patricia
- Relations: Jerome Cavanagh (brother)
- Children: Megan Cavanagh
- Education: University of Detroit (BA, LLB)

Michael Francis Cavanagh (October 21, 1940 – May 20, 2025) was an American justice of the Michigan Supreme Court.

== Life and career ==
Cavanagh was born in Lansing, Michigan, U.S. and a younger brother of Jerome Cavanagh who was Mayor of Detroit in the 1960s. He earned a B.A. degree from the University of Detroit in 1962 and his JD degree from the University of Detroit Law School in 1966.

He previously served as a judge on the Michigan Court of Appeals from 1975 to 1982. Before that, he served as Lansing City Attorney and as a District Court judge.

Cavanagh served as chief justice from 1991 to 1995.

In November 2018, his daughter, Megan Cavanagh, was elected as an associate justice of the Michigan Supreme Court, and became the first child to have joined her parent as a member of the Court since 1857. He died on May 20, 2025, at the age of 84.
