= 2010 Michigan Proposal 1 =

Proposal 1
- Proposal to convene a constitutional convention for the purpose of drafting a general revision of the State Constitution.

Results
Choice	Votes	%
Yes	983,019	33.40%
No	1,960,573	66.60%
Total votes	2,943,592	100.00%
County results
No
70–80%
60–70%

2010 Michigan Proposal 1 was an automatic ballot referral in the state of Michigan which was voted on in the 2010 Michigan elections. It was intended to call for a constitutional convention to review and edit the state constitution. It was voted on on November 2, 2010 and failed. Supporters of the proposal included the Jackson Citizen Patriot, the Bay City Times, the Traverse City Record-Eagle, the Blade and the Oakland Press. Opponents of the proposal included The Holland Sentinel, The Detroit News and The Daily Telegram.

== Result ==
Result	Votes	Percentage
Yes	983,019	33.40
No	1,960,573	66.60
