= 2026 Wayne County Executive election =

Local election in Michigan, US

- November 3, 2026
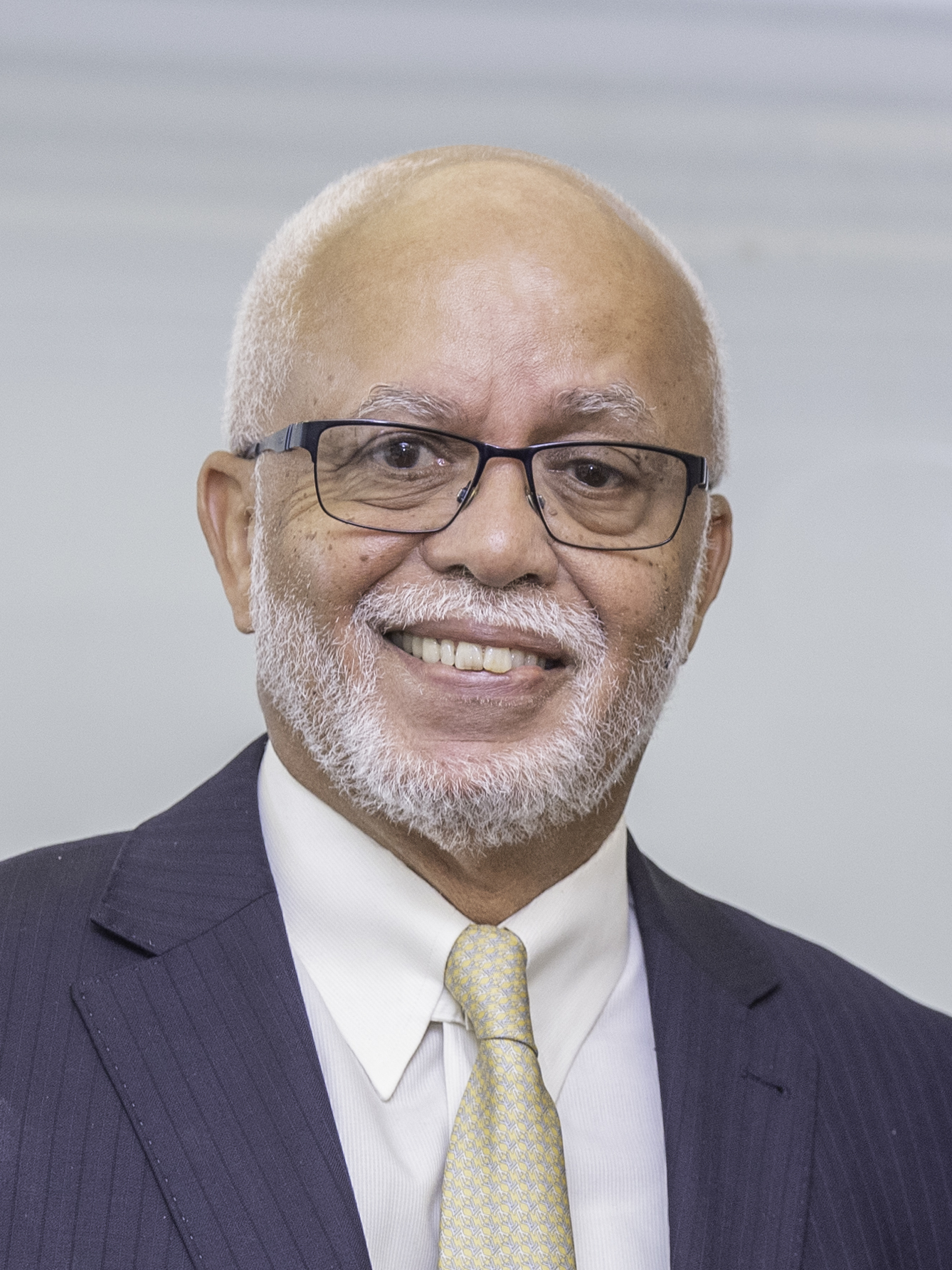

Candidate	Warren Evans	Michael Evans
Party	Democratic	Republican
Popular vote	516,718	184,372
Percentage	72.08	25.72
county executive before election
Warren Evans
Democratic
Elected county executive
Warren Evans
Democratic

The 2026 Wayne County Executive election was held on November 3, 2026, to elect the county executive of Wayne County, Michigan. Primary elections were held on August 4, 2026. Incumbent Democratic county executive Warren Evans ran for re-election and defeated both Republican Michael Evans and independent John Olumba in the general election.

== Democratic primary ==
=== Candidates ===
==== Nominee ====
- Warren Evans, incumbent county executive (2015–present)

==== Eliminated in primary ====
- Sigmunt Szczepkowski Jr.

=== Results ===
Democratic primary results
Party	Candidate	Votes	%
Democratic	Warren Evans (incumbent)	222,244	87.57
Democratic	Sigmunt Szczepkowski Jr.	29,251	11.52
Write-in		2,304	0.91
Total votes		253,799	100.00

== Republican primary ==
=== Candidate ===
==== Nominee ====
- Michael Evans

=== Results ===
Republican primary results
Party	Candidate	Votes	%
Republican	Michael Evans	66,166	99.62
Write-in		251	0.38
Total votes		66,417	100.00

== Independent ==
=== Candidate ===
==== Declared ====
- John Olumba, former state representative from the 3rd district (2011–2014)

== General election ==
=== Results ===
General election results
Party	Candidate	Votes	%
Democratic	Warren Evans (incumbent)	516,718	72.08
Republican	Michael Evans	184,372	25.72
Independent	John Olumba	13,803	1.93
Write-in		1,969	0.27
Total votes		716,862	100.0
Democratic hold			
