= Alpha Delta Theta (social) =

Defunct American collegiate sorority

- ΑΔΘ
- Founded: November 10, 1921; 104 years ago Transylvania University
- Type: Social
- Former affiliation: NPC
- Status: Merged
- Merge date: August 30, 1939
- Successor: Phi Mu
- Scope: National (US)
- Motto: Ex Principilis Omnia Oriuntur
- Member badge
- Colors: Turquoise Blue, Silver, and Scarlet
- Symbol: Candle and crossed palms
- Flower: French Sweet Pea
- Jewel: Emerald and pearl
- Publication: The Silhouette (1924-1929); The Portals (1929-1939)
- Chapters: 25
- Headquarters: 4161 Bay View Avenue; Little Neck, New York; United States

Alpha Delta Theta (ΑΔΘ) was a national collegiate sorority operating in the United States from 1919 to 1939. The sorority officially affiliated with Phi Mu fraternity on August 30, 1939.

== History ==
Ten female students at Transylvania College in Lexington, Kentucky formed the local women's fraternity, Alpha Theta, in the fall of 1919. Its founders were students Willibel Chilton, Irene Duncan, Ruth Dutt, Valleria Grannis, Hazel Grow, Martha Hall, Zenaide Harold, Juanita Minish, Mary Owsley, and Violet Young, along with faculty member Isabel Wolf Hemenway.

At the time of Alpha Theta's formation, there were only two national women's fraternities in the United States. Alpha Theta approached one of the national sororities about membership; however, their request was denied because of Alpha Theta's affiliation with Hamilton, a junior college for women. Having heard that the National Panhellenic Conference "declared the number of national sororities was too small", the Alpha Thetas decided to form their own national group. On November 10, 1921, Alpha Theta became Alpha Delta Theta, though The Pledge Handbook of Alpha Delta Theta cites the founding date as November 10, 1919.

Alpha Delta Theta established its second chapter, Beta, in June 1922 at the University of Kentucky. This was followed by Gamma at the University of Cincinnati, Delta at the University of Illinois, Epsilon at Butler College, and Zeta at the University of Nebraska in 1923.

Within three years of its existence, Alpha Delta Theta created eight collegiate chapters. The sorority was granted "associate membership" by the National Panhellenic Conference in October 1923. Three years later, in 1926, the sorority had full NPC membership. The new national sorority was admitted to the NPC in 1926. "It was admitted to the Congress at an earlier date in its history than any other fraternity". On March 15, 1926, Alpha Delta Theta was incorporated as a national organization in the state of Kentucky.

Alpha Delta Theta grew quickly and with much strength in its twenty years of existence. In 1930, it had 17 chapters and 1,258 members. At the time, four of its chapters owned houses and four others had purchased land for construction. In 1931, it had 18 chapters and 1,500 members. By 1932, Alpha Delta Theta had installed 25 collegiate chapters and 21 alumnae groups. The 1932–1933 academic year was especially noteworthy for Alpha Delta Theta, as "it had the distinction of breaking all fraternity records in scholarship... when 34 percent of its chapters held first place in scholarship on their respective campuses".

Alpha Delta Theta was governed by a grand council that was elected by chapter delegates to national biennial conventions. The grand council consisted of the grand president, grand vice-president, grand secretary, grand treasurer, and the editor of the Alpha Delta Theta magazine. The fraternity held its first two national conventions in Lexington, Kentucky. In 1931, its central office was in Little Neck, New York.

== Merger with Phi Mu ==
Despite these gains, Alpha Delta Theta had come into its flowering somewhat late when compared to the other established chapters on its campuses and thus faced several difficulties.

During the 1920s, while Alpha Delta Theta was prospering in the establishment of chapters, competing organizations had not been idle. There was a massive wave of building projects sweeping through those same venerable campuses where Alpha Delta Theta was placing its chapters. A decade (or sometimes multiple decades) of alumni was able to bankroll and guarantee these projects. The strain of the Great Depression meant that Greek participation dropped precipitously; larger chapters became shells of themselves, while small chapters were wiped out. Rather than a steep downturn followed by a quick, roaring reset to the economy, the Great Depression lingered, and more than anything, this led to a crisis where chapter after chapter failed (even valued chapters on impressive campuses). National officers and chapter alumnae were faced with the potential of complete loss, a prospect that had been unthinkable just five years prior.

Thus, Alpha Delta Theta was not able to survive the 1930s. "With some larger chapter houses that were unable to cope with the post-depression years and with the extensive campus building programs necessary to be competitive, its Grand Council decided to take an unprecedented step". In the summer of 1938, Alpha Delta Theta officers sought out a national organization with history, values, and ideals similar to their own: Phi Mu was ultimately chosen. Carefully and quietly, Alpha Delta Theta and Phi Mu prepared the Letter of Agreement and other pertinent legal documents required for the distribution of Alpha Delta Theta's assets. "All officers, chapters, and alumnae groups were contacted in January 1939, and by May the unanimous approval as required by both Constitutions was in hand". "Unanimous approval" was an extraordinary feat in itself, and makes clear the focus that this crisis allowed these leaders. The summer was spent answering questions and resolving concerns about the merger. The affiliation became official on August 30, 1939.

After the 26th session of the National Panhellenic Conference in White Sulphur Springs, West Virginia, on November 4, 1939, ADT's NPC delegate Violet Young Gentry announced her organization's affiliation with Phi Mu fraternity. The next day, Alpha Delta Theta Corporation was dissolved. Phi Mu officers began initiating collegiate and alumnae members of Alpha Delta Theta. Phi Mu gained five new chapters through affiliation and eight through campus mergers. Four new alumnae groups from Alpha Delta Theta were installed as Phi Mu alumnae chapters; ADT's eighteen alumnae groups in cities where Phi Mu had alumnae chapters were disbanded and absorbed into Phi Mu.

== Symbols ==
College Fraternity Heraldry described Alpha Delta Theta's coat-of-arms as "argent; on a chief gules three keys of the first per fess, in base two palm branches saltirewise vert. Crest. A candle argent in candlestick flared of the same. Supporters. Two unicorns proper". The motto, a Greek phrase, was written on a banner under the shield. This coat-of-arms was adopted at the national convention in 1928; it is based entirely on ritualistic symbolism.

The badge of Alpha Delta Theta is described as being of yellow gold, Delta or triangular shaped, and "superimposed upon a gold key placed horizontally". The center of the badge was black enamel, with the Greek letter "Α" was in the lower left-hand angle, the letter Δ" in the apex, and the letter "Θ" in the lower right-hand angle. Between the "Α" and "Θ" was a "lighted candle in a candlestick.... with crossed palm branches above". The border could have fifteen pearls with an emerald at each corner. The pledge pin was "a vertical bar of silver, bearing the raised Greek letters "ΑΔΘ" one above the other".

The local women's fraternity, Alpha Theta, used Esse Non Videri for the motto; the sweet pea for its flower; and the colors silver and turquoise blue. Alpha Delta Theta's motto was Ex Principilis Omnia Oriuntur. The colors of the sorority were turquoise blue, silver, and scarlet. (Note: According to Baird's Manual of American College Fraternities (1930), the colors were turquoise blue, amethyst, and silver, but this appears to have been in error: The 1929 Alpha Delta Theta pledge manual and the 1937 Alpha Delta Theta constitution and bylaws both confirm turquoise blue, silver, and scarlet. These are also correctly stated in The Sorority Handbook (1931).) Its flower was the French sweet pea. Its jewels were the emerald and the pearl. Its insignia was a candle and crossed palms.

Alpha Delta Theta's publication was The Silhouette, first appearing in May 1924 and changing its name to The Portals in 1928.

=== Creed of Alpha Delta Theta ===
To live each day as if it were the last:

To lift each moment to its clearest height;

To profit from the pages of the past

That I may judge between the wrong and right;

To hold my friends above my own desire,

And take the heavy end of friendship's load,

Yet blame them not if they perchance should tire,

And choose a gentler path, a smoother road;

To serve humanity as though 'twere God,

And see the human in His face divine;

To answer Truth's command and Beauty's nod,

And make their splendid consummations mine;

To dare to follow where I cannot lead-

This is my Alpha Delta Theta creed!

== Activities ==
The sorority's national philanthropy was the supplying of books and periodicals to Buffalo School in Moores Creek, Kentucky. The school was remote, rural, and in need of reading materials. Founder's Day was celebrated every November 10. All members gave one dollar to the Alpha Delta Theta philanthropic project.

== Chapters ==
Following are the chapters of Alpha Delta Theta, with inactive chapters noted in italics.

Chapter	Charter date and range	Institution	Location	Status	Ref.
Alpha	November 10, 1919 – November 6, 1939	Transylvania University	Lexington, Kentucky	Merged (ΦΜ)	(Note: Chapter formed at the then-Transylvania College from Alpha Theta (local), established in 1916. With the national merger of the two sororities, it became the Delta Theta chapter of Phi Mu.)
Beta	June 1922 – 1937	University of Kentucky	Lexington, Kentucky	Inactive	(Note: Chapter formed from Beta Theta (local), established in 1921.)
Gamma	1923–1939	University of Cincinnati	Cincinnati, Ohio	Merged (ΦΜ)	(Note: Chapter formed from Theta Alpha Pi (local), established in 1923. It merged into the Delta Zeta chapter of Phi Mu with the national merger of the two sororities.)
Delta	1923–1934	University of Illinois	Champaign, Illinois	Inactive	(Note: Chapter formed from Aeolia (local), established in 1922.)
Epsilon	1923–1933	Butler University	Indianapolis, Indiana	Inactive	(Note: Chapter formed from Delta Pi Omega (local), established in 1921.)
Zeta	1923–1932	University of Nebraska	Lincoln, Nebraska	Inactive	(Note: Chapter formed from Alpha Theta (local), established in 1923.)
Eta	1924–1932	Ohio State University	Columbus, Ohio	Inactive	(Note: Chapter formed from the Kleman Club (local), established in 1915.)
Theta	1924–1936	University of Washington	Seattle, Washington	Inactive	(Note: Chapter formed from Alpha Nu Delta (local), established in 1920.)
Iota	1924–1934	University of California	Berkeley, California	Inactive	(Note: Chapter formed from the Keweah Club (local), established in 1919.)
Kappa	1925–1934	Ohio Wesleyan University	Delaware, Ohio	Inactive	(Note: Chapter formed from Gamma Theta Nu (local), established in 1924.)
Lambda	1926–1939	George Washington University	Washington, D.C.	Merged (ΦΜ)	(Note: Chapter formed from Phi Sigma (local), established in 1921. It joined the Beta Alpha chapter of Phi Mu with the national merger of the two sororities.)
Mu	1926–1939	University of California, Los Angeles	Los Angeles, California	Merged (ΦΜ)	(Note: Chapter formed from Phi Sigma Pi (local), established in 1926. It joined the Eta Delta chapter of Phi Mu with the national merger of the two sororities.)
Nu	1927 – December 6, 1939	Nebraska Wesleyan University	Lincoln, Nebraska	Merged (ΦΜ)	(Note: Chapter formed from Omega Rho Omega (local), established in 1907. It became the Zeta Kappa chapter of Phi Mu with the national merger of the two sororities.)
Xi	1927–1939	Adelphi University	Garden City, New York	Merged (ΦΜ)	(Note: Chapter formed from Delta Phi Omega (local), established in 1922. It joined the Psi chapter of Phi Mu with the national merger of the two sororities.)
Omicron	1928–1939	Brenau University	Gainesville, Georgia	Merged (ΦΜ)	(Note: Chapter formed from Delta Phi Sigma (local), established in 1927. It joined the Mu chapter of Phi Mu with the national merger of the two sororities.)
Pi	1928–1938	Howard College	Homewood, Alabama	Merged (ΦΜ)	(Note: Chapter formed from Beta Delta Sigma (local), established in 1925. It joined the Alpha Gamma chapter of Phi Mu with the national merger of the two sororities.)
Rho	1929–1935	Ohio University	Athens, Ohio	Inactive	(Note: Chapter formed from the Presome Club (local), established in 1922.)
Sigma	1930 – December 13, 1939	University of Tulsa	Tulsa, Oklahoma	Merged (ΦΜ)	(Note: Chapter formed from Kappa Gamma Chi (local), established in 1894. It became the Epsilon Gamma chapter of Phi Mu with the national merger of the two sororities.)
Tau	1931–1935	University of Minnesota	Minneapolis, Minnesota	Inactive	(Note: Chapter formed from Phi Delta Sigma (local), established in 1927. It went inactive about four years before the national merger with Phi Mu.)
Upsilon	1931–1933	University of Missouri	Columbia, Missouri	Inactive	(Note: Chapter formed from Chi Beta Epsilon (local), established in 1918.)
Phi	1931–1939	University of Southern California	Los Angeles, California	Merged (ΦΜ)	(Note: Chapter formed from Delta Theta (local), established in 1927. It joined the Iota Sigma chapter of Phi Mu with the national merger of the two sororities.)
Chi	1932–1938	University of Nevada	Reno, Nevada	Inactive	(Note: Chapter formed from Beta Delta (local), established in 1923.)
Psi	1932–1939	Queens University of Charlotte	Charlotte, North Carolina	Merged (ΦΜ)	(Note: Chapter formed from Kappa Kappa Chi (local), established in 1925. It joined the Gamma Gamma chapter of Phi Mu with the national merger of the two sororities.)
Omega	1932 – November 18, 1939	Bethany College	Bethany, West Virginia	Merged (ΦΜ)	(Note: Chapter formed from Gamma Chi (local), established in 1924. It became the Beta Nu chapter of Phi Mu with the national merger of the two sororities.)
Alpha Alpha	1934 – November 12, 1939	College of Charleston	Charleston, South Carolina	Merged (ΦΜ)	(Note: Chapter formed from Pi Gamma Chi (local), established in 1927. It became the Alpha Kappa chapter of Phi Mu with the national merger of the two sororities.)

== See also ==
- List of social sororities and women's fraternities
