= Business Leaders for Michigan =

Non-profit organization based in Detroit

Business Leaders For Michigan
- Formation: 2009
- Type: Non-profit
- Purpose: To serve as the business roundtable for the state of Michigan
- Location: Detroit, Michigan, United States
- Region served: Michigan
- President & CEO: Jeff Donofrio
- Website: BusinessLeadersforMichigan.com

Business Leaders for Michigan is a private, non-profit organization based in Detroit, Michigan, United States. Originally formed in 1970 as the Detroit Renaissance, the organization was reconstituted in 2009 as Business Leaders For Michigan with an expanded focus on the entire state of Michigan. Membership consists exclusively of the most senior level executives, and chairpersons of many of the state's largest employers and universities.

== Mission ==
Business Leaders For Michigan is a statewide organization driven by CEOs from the state's leading employers, all working toward a shared goal: making Michigan a Top 10 state for jobs, talent and a thriving economy.

== Initiatives ==
- Compete to Win: Michigan's Path to Top 10 A plan to make Michigan more competitive, with strategies to win new business, attract talent and generate more widely shared prosperity
- Renaissance Venture Capital Fund, a $100 million "fund of funds" created with the goal of promoting the growth of venture capital investments in Michigan, primarily in relation to bridging the work done by the emerging innovative companies in the area with the more established industrial and commercial bases

== Notable members ==
- William Clay Ford, Jr., Executive Chairman of Ford Motor Company
- Dan Gilbert, founder and Chairman of Quicken Loans
- Roger Penske, Chairman of Penske Corporation
- Santa Ono, President of University of Michigan
- Mary Barra, Chair and CEO of General Motors
