= Theta Kappa Pi =

American collegiate sorority

- ΘΚΠ
- Founded: February 13, 1984; 41 years ago Pennsylvania State University
- Type: Service
- Affiliation: Independent
- Status: Active
- Scope: Regional
- Motto: ΦΣΙ ΙΣΑ ΙΛΒ "Friendship, Service, and Integrity"
- Colors: Royal Blue, Kelly Green, and White
- Tree: Yggdrasil
- Jewel: Emerald, Sapphire, and Pearl
- Mascot: Lion
- Patron Greek deity: Odin the Wanderer
- Philanthropy: Domestic Violence Awareness and Prevention
- Chapters: 3
- Headquarters: United States
- Website: thetakappapi.org

Theta Kappa Pi (ΘΚΠ) is an American regional sorority founded at Penn State University in 1984. Its focus is on service.

== History ==
Theta Kappa Pi sorority was established at Penn State University on February 13, 1984. On October 23, 1987, the Beta chapter of Theta Kappa Pi was established under the direction of nine founding sisters at the University of Charleston. In 1988, the Alpha chapter and the Beta chapter formed a regional sorority. Gamma chapter at Lewis University was established on February 19, 2002.

On September 18, 2005, representatives of the Alpha chapter and the Beta Mu chapter of Phi Mu met to discuss a possible merger of the two organizations. At the time, the Alpha chapter had an active membership but wanted to belong to a national organization. In contrast, the Phi Mu chapter was struggling to recruit members but belonged to the National Panhellenic Conference Phi Mu offered a blanket bid to 67 members of Theta Kappa Pi. On September 20, 2005, 65 Alpha chapter members accepted the merger invitation, bringing an end to the Alpha chapter.

On December 8, 2017, the Delta chapter was chartered at Purdue University Northwest.

== Symbols ==
The motto of Theta Kappa Pi is ΦΣΙ ΙΣΑ ΙΛΒ or "Friendship, Service, Integrity". Its colors are royal blue, kelly green, and white. Its flower changes with each class. Its tree is the Yggdrasil. Its jewels are sapphire, emerald, and pearl. Its mascot is the lion. Its patron Greek divinity is Odin the Wanderer.

== Philanthropy ==
Theta Kappa Pi is dedicated to fighting domestic violence against women. Its primary charities are The Caring Place and Guardian Angel Community Service. Sorority also volunteer and/or raise funds for American Heart Association, American Cancer Society, Feed My Starving Children, Habitat for Humanity, Juvenile Diabetes Foundation, March of Dimes, and Trick or Treat for UNICEF. They also work with local nonprofit organizations such as feeding the homeless, visiting retirement homes, picking litter in local parks, and getting gifts for the ARC of Centre County.

== Chapters ==
Following is a list of Theta Kappa Pi chapters. Active chapters are indicated in bold. Inactive chapters are italics.

Name	Charted date and range	Institution	Location	Status	References
Alpha	February 13, 1984 – September 5, 2005	Pennsylvania State University	University Park, Pennsylvania	Withdrew (**ΦΜ**)	(Note: Withdrew and became the Beta Mu chapter of Phi Mu.)
**Beta**	October 23, 1987	University of Charleston	Charleston, West Virginia	Active	
**Gamma**	February 21, 2002	Lewis University	Romeoville, Illinois	Inactive	
**Delta**	December 8, 2017	Purdue University Northwest	Hammond, Indiana	Inactive	
