= Amy Ronanye Krause =

American judge

Amy Ronayne Krause is a judge of the Michigan Court of appeals 4th District.

She has a bachelor's degree from the University of Michigan and a Juris Doctor degree from the University of Notre Dame. She was appointed to the appeals court in 2010. Before that she served for eight years as a district judge in Lansing.

== Sources ==
- Michigan Appeals Court bio
