= Kurtis T. Wilder =

American judge

Kurtis Wilder

Associate Justice of the Michigan Supreme Court
- In office May 10, 2017 – January 1, 2019
- Appointed by: Rick Snyder
- Preceded by: Robert P. Young Jr.
- Succeeded by: Megan Cavanagh

Personal details
- Born: April 26, 1959 (age 66); Cleveland, Ohio, U.S.
- Political party: Republican
- Children: 2
- Education: University of Michigan (A.B.); University of Michigan Law School (J.D.)

Kurtis T. Wilder (born April 26, 1959) is an American judge who served as an associate justice of the Michigan Supreme Court, appointed in May 2017 by Gov. Rick Snyder.

== Biography ==
Wilder was born in Cleveland, Ohio, educated in the public schools and graduated from Cleveland Heights High School. He then attended the University of Michigan, graduating in 1981 with an A.B. degree in political science, and earned his Juris Doctor from the University of Michigan Law School in 1984. After law school, he was in private practice with Foster, Swift, Collins & Smith P.C. in Lansing, and Butzel Long P.C. in Detroit.

In March 1992, Governor John Engler appointed Wilder as judge of the Washtenaw County Circuit Court to complete the six-year term of Ross W. Campbell. In November 1992, Wilder was elected to a full term, and was the first African American judge elected in that county. In December 1998, Governor Engler elevated Wilder to the Michigan First District Court of Appeals. Wilder was elected in 2000, and re-elected in 2004, 2010 and 2016.

On May 9, 2017, Governor Snyder appointed Wilder to the Michigan Supreme Court. Wilder completed his predecessor Robert P. Young Jr.'s term in December 2018.

In November 2018, Wilder ran unsuccessfully for election to a full eight-year term but was defeated by Megan Cavanagh in the election by 54,000 votes out of 3 million cast. His departure left the Court with no sitting African-American justice. After leaving office, he returned to practice law at Butzel Long.

In July 2017, Wilder received the Honorable Harold Hood Award, presented by the Association of Black Judges of Michigan. In October 2018, he was presented the Western Michigan University Cooley Law School Integrity Award.

He is a member of the Federalist Society.

== Personal life ==
Wilder lives in Canton, Michigan, and has two children.

== See also ==
- List of justices of the Michigan Supreme Court
- Black conservatism in the United States

== Videos ==
- Justice Kurtis Wilder Investiture. Michigan Supreme Court. October 17, 2017 (1:28:41 mins). YouTube.com.

Legal offices
Preceded by Robert P. Young Jr.	Associate Justice of the Michigan Supreme Court; 2017–2018	Succeeded by Megan Cavanagh
