= Robert P. Young Jr. =

American judge (born 1951)

68th Chief Justice of the Michigan Supreme Court
- In office January 5, 2011 – January 6, 2017
- Preceded by: Marilyn Kelly
- Succeeded by: Stephen Markman

Justice of the Michigan Supreme Court
- In office December 30, 1998 – April 30, 2017
- Appointed by: John Engler
- Preceded by: Conrad Mallett
- Succeeded by: Kurtis T. Wilder

Judge of the Michigan Court of Appeals
- In office 1995 – December 30, 1998
- Appointed by: John Engler

Personal details
- Born: June 13, 1951 (age 75) Des Moines, Iowa, U.S.
- Party: Republican
- Education: Harvard University (BA, JD)

Robert P. Young Jr. (born June 13, 1951) is a former justice of the Michigan Supreme Court. Young was first appointed to the Michigan Supreme Court in 1999, elected in 2000 and 2002, and again won reelection in 2010 for a term ending in 2019. Justice Young announced he would be retiring from the court at the end of April 2017. Young is a self-described judicial traditionalist or textualist. In June 2017, Young announced his intentions to run against Debbie Stabenow in the 2018 senate race, but later dropped out saying he could not raise enough money for his campaign.

== Early life and education ==
Young was born in Des Moines, Iowa, and grew up in Detroit, Michigan. Young has recounted how he was raised in a city that was operating under de facto segregation at the time; when he was a child, his family was one of the first to integrate northwest Detroit. He attended Detroit public elementary schools and graduated from Detroit Country Day School in 1970, with honors from Harvard College in 1974, and from Harvard Law School in 1977.

== Professional life ==
In 1978, Young joined the law firm of Dickinson Wright, where he became a partner in 1982. In 1992, he joined AAA Michigan where he served as general counsel. In 1995, Young was appointed to the Michigan Court of Appeals, and later elevated to the Michigan Supreme Court by Governor John Engler in 1999 to replace resigning Chief Justice Conrad Mallett.

At his investiture ceremony on February 18, 1999, Judge Damon Keith, of the Sixth Circuit Court of Appeals administered the oath of office to Young. To mark the occasion, his former law partner at Dickinson Wright, Detroit Mayor Dennis Archer explained that Young possessed "excellent skill, a great work ethic, and great judicial temperament." Attorney General and future-Governor Jennifer Granholm called Young "a man of tremendous talent and assiduousness[,] ... an unbelievably fair person[,] ... [and] a rich, wonderful, thoughtful, and fair asset to the Supreme Court of Michigan." Governor John Engler explained that Young "is a brilliant scholar, learned in both the state and United States Constitutions."

Young won statewide campaigns in 2000 for the remainder of former justice Conrad Mallett's term, and in 2002 and 2010 for full eight-year terms, the latter of which expires in 2019. During Young's tenure on the court, an op-ed appeared in The Wall Street Journal praising Young in particular and calling the Michigan Supreme Court "what may be the finest court in the nation" and "a leader in attempting to restore a proper balance between the judiciary, the legislature and the people."

Young is an adjunct professor at Michigan State University College of Law. Known for his community involvement in the greater Detroit area, Young currently serves as chairman of the board for Vista Maria, a Detroit-based charity for disadvantaged young women. He has previously served as a member of the advisory board of the United Community Services of Metropolitan Detroit and as a member of the board of trustees of Central Michigan University.

Young was named the Jurist of the Year by the Police Officer's Association of Michigan in 2000 and again in 2010.

Young was named the American Justice Partnership's "Guardian of Justice" in 2010. The group explained that Young is a "tireless protector of the U.S. Constitution, strong and steady defender of our nation's principles of justice, and unstinting adherent to the intentions and ideals of our nation's founders."

Young was elected Chief Justice of the Michigan Supreme Court on January 5, 2011.

Young, along with fellow Michigan Supreme Court Justice Joan Larsen, was on Republican presidential nominee Donald Trump's list of potential Supreme Court justices in May 2016, though the appointment went to Judge Neil Gorsuch of the United States Court of Appeals for the Tenth Circuit, who was confirmed by the United States Senate on April 7, 2017.

On March 29, 2017, Justice Young announced that he would retire from the Michigan Supreme Court by April 30 of that year to return to private practice. His retirement from the court became official on April 17, 2017.

In April 2017, Young confirmed he was being courted to seek the Republican nomination to challenge incumbent Democratic Sen. Debbie Stabenow in 2018. He officially joined the race in June 2017 but withdrew from the race in January 2018.

== Notable Michigan Supreme Court decisions ==
=== Property rights ===
Young authored the Michigan Supreme Court's decision in Wayne County v. Hathcock (2004), which involved a dispute over the power of eminent domain to transfer privately owned real estate to another private entity for a commercial business and technology park. Decided one year before the landmark U.S. Supreme Court decision in Kelo v. City of New London, Young's decision held that the Michigan Constitution only allowed eminent domain for "public use" and determined that three circumstances justified condemnation through eminent domain to a private entity: "(1) where 'public necessity of the extreme sort' requires collective action; (2) where the property remains subject to public oversight after transfer to a private entity; and (3) where the property is selected because of 'facts of independent public significance,' rather than the interests of the private entity to which the property is eventually transferred.'"

Hathcock overturned the 1981 Michigan Supreme Court decision in Poletown Neighborhood Council v. Detroit, which Young criticized as a "radical and unabashed departure from the entirety of this Court's...eminent domain jurisprudence" because it "concluded, for the first time in the history of our eminent domain jurisprudence, that a generalized economic benefit was sufficient under [the Michigan Constitution] to justify the transfer of condemned property to a private entity."

=== Voting rights ===
Young authored the Michigan Supreme Court's advisory opinion regarding whether election officials can require photo identification before voting in In Re Request for Advisory Opinion Regarding the Constitutionality of 2005 PA 71 (2007). The Court upheld a requirement that voters present photo identification before voting as a "reasonable, nondiscriminatory" requirement to vote that has the legitimate goal of preserving the fairness of elections. The Court held that the requirement did not amount to a "poll tax" or present a severe burden on voters. Young explained: "the act of reaching into one's purse or wallet and presenting photo identification before being issued a ballot" is a reasonable requirement, and even those without identification may simply sign an affidavit in lieu of presenting identification or obtain an identification card free of charge from the Secretary of State. Young also explained that the fundamental right to vote includes the assurance that one's vote will not be cancelled out by fraudulent votes, giving the State a compelling interest to prevent voter fraud in elections.

=== Other constitutional doctrines ===
Young authored the Michigan Supreme Court's decision in Michigan Citizens for Water Conservation v. Nestle Waters North America (2007). which applied Michigan's constitutional standing doctrine to the Michigan Environmental Protection Act. The doctrine of standing (law) involves the ability of a person or corporation to bring a lawsuit, and thus assert legal rights and duties in the courts. As Young's opinion explained: "We vigilantly enforce principles of standing in order to vindicate the separation of legislative, executive, and judicial powers among the coordinate branches of government to which those respective powers have been committed." As the Court had previously articulated in Lee v. Macomb County Board of Comm'rs (2001), which applied principles of federal standing doctrine, standing requires a plaintiff to have suffered "an invasion of a legally protected interest which is (a) concrete and particularized, and (b) 'actual or imminent, not "conjectural" or "hypothetical" that has a "causal connection" to "the conduct complained of" and which is "likely" to be "redressed by a favorable decision" by a court.

Applying federal and state principles of standing doctrine in Michigan Citizens for Water Conservation, Young's decision concluded that "[w]here the plaintiff claims an injury related to the environment, this Court lacks the 'judicial power' to hear the claim if the plaintiff cannot aver facts that he has suffered or will imminently suffer a concrete and particularized injury in fact," such as "when the defendant’s activities directly affected the plaintiff’s recreational, aesthetic, or economic interests."

== Accusation of obstructing a notable investigation rejected by court ==
Special Prosecutor William Forsyth, who has been tasked with investigating the details surrounding Larry Nassar's crimes, has accused MSU of obstructing his probe by withholding critical information under Young's guidance. Young's position was vindicated by the court by order dated March 19, 2019, when the court dismissed Forsyth's subpoena finding that MSU had produced all nonprivileged documents.

== Publications ==
Young published the chapter "‘Active Liberty’ and the Problem of Judicial Oligarchy" in The Supreme Court and the Idea of Constitutionalism, published by the University of Pennsylvania Press in 2009. His other publications include "A Judicial Traditionalist Confronts the Common Law," and "A Judicial Traditionalist Confronts Justice Brennan's School of Judicial Philosophy."

Young is a co-editor of Michigan Civil Procedure During Trial, 2d Ed. (Michigan Institute of Continuing Legal Education, 1989) and Michigan Civil Procedure, (Michigan Institute of Continuing Legal Education, 1999).

== Personal life ==
Young has been married for over 40 years; he and his wife, Dr. Linda Hotchkiss, have two adult children. They lived in Grosse Pointe Park, Michigan when Young was appointed to the Michigan Supreme Court. Young and his wife currently live in the Lansing, Michigan area. Dr. Hotchkiss is a psychiatrist.

== See also ==
- Donald Trump Supreme Court candidates
- Black conservatism in the United States

Legal offices
Preceded by Conrad Mallett	Associate Justice of the Michigan Supreme Court; 1998–2017	Succeeded by Kurtis T. Wilder
Preceded by Marilyn Kelly	Chief Justice of the Michigan Supreme Court; 2011–2017	Succeeded by Stephen Markman
