= Joan Larsen =

American judge (born 1968)

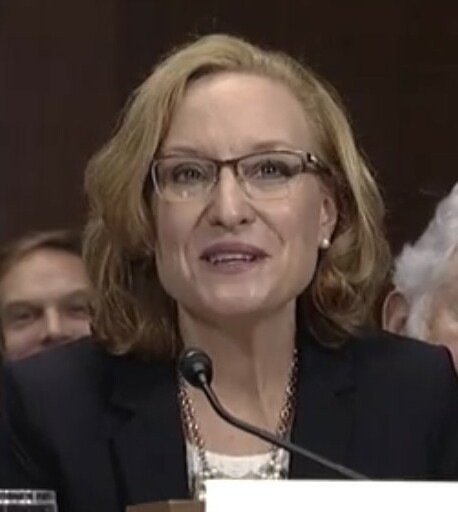

Judge of the United States Court of Appeals for the Sixth Circuit
- Incumbent
- Assumed office November 2, 2017
- Appointed by: Donald Trump
- Preceded by: David McKeague

Associate Justice of the Michigan Supreme Court
- In office October 5, 2015 – November 3, 2017
- Appointed by: Rick Snyder
- Preceded by: Mary Beth Kelly
- Succeeded by: Elizabeth T. Clement

Personal details
- Born: December 1, 1968 (age 57) Waterloo, Iowa, U.S.
- Party: Republican
- Spouse: Adam Pritchard
- Education: University of Northern Iowa (BA); Northwestern University (JD)

Joan Louise Larsen (born December 1, 1968) is an American attorney serving as a United States circuit judge of the United States Court of Appeals for the Sixth Circuit. She previously was an associate justice of the Michigan Supreme Court from 2015 to 2017.

== Early life and education ==
Larsen was born on December 1, 1968, in Waterloo, Iowa. She graduated from Herbert Hoover High School in Des Moines in 1985, and she earned her Bachelor of Arts from the University of Northern Iowa and received her Juris Doctor from the Northwestern University Pritzker School of Law, where she graduated first in her class in 1993. While at Northwestern, she served as articles editor of the Northwestern University Law Review.

== Career ==
Larsen became a professor at the University of Michigan Law School in 1998. She clerked for Judge David B. Sentelle of the United States Court of Appeals for the District of Columbia Circuit and for Justice Antonin Scalia of the United States Supreme Court during the 1994 term. She served as Deputy Assistant Attorney General in the United States Department of Justice Office of Legal Counsel from January 2002 to May 2003 in the administration of President George W. Bush. Larsen did not contribute to the OLC's Torture Memos, and in March 2002 she authored a memo addressing detainee court access.

=== Michigan Supreme Court ===
On October 1, 2015, Larsen was appointed to the Michigan Supreme Court by Governor Rick Snyder to replace Justice Mary Beth Kelly, who announced plans to resign and return to private practice, effective October 1, 2015. She was elected on November 8, 2016, to fill the remainder of Kelly's unexpired term, which ran through the end of 2018. Larsen received 58.7% of the vote in a three-way race against Deborah Thomas and Kerry Morgan. She was on Republican presidential nominee Donald Trump's May 2016 list of potential Supreme Court justices. Her service was terminated due to her appointment to the United States Court of Appeals for the Sixth Circuit.

=== Federal judicial service ===
On May 8, 2017, President Donald Trump nominated Larsen to serve as a United States Circuit Judge of the United States Court of Appeals for the Sixth Circuit, to the seat soon to be vacated by Judge David McKeague. Larsen's nomination was held up for months by Michigan's Senators, Debbie Stabenow and Gary Peters. The two Democrats initially refused to return their blue slips for Larsen, an informal United States Senate practice that essentially gives Senators veto power over federal judicial nominees from their home state. Larsen met separately with Peters and Stabenow on July 26, 2017. Stabenow and Peters both returned blue slips in August 2017, allowing Larsen's hearing to move forward.

A hearing on Larsen's nomination before the Senate Judiciary Committee was held on September 6, 2017. On October 5, 2017, the Judiciary Committee reported her nomination out of committee by an 11–9 vote. Senate Majority Leader Mitch McConnell filed a cloture motion to limit debate on Larsen's nomination on October 26, 2017, clearing the path for the Senate to vote in the first week of November 2017. On October 31, 2017, the Senate invoked cloture on the nomination by a 60–38 vote, with Stabenow and Peters voting to proceed with her nomination and give Larsen a final up-or-down vote. On November 1, 2017, Larsen was confirmed by a 60–38 vote. Both Stabenow and Peters, along with six other Senate Democrats, joined all 52 Senate Republicans to confirm Larsen. She received her commission on November 2, 2017.

==== Notable cases as a circuit court judge ====
In In re MCP NO. 165, 21 F.4th 357 (6th Cir. 2021), Larsen dissented from the panel's decision to dissolve a stay that enjoined an OSHA rule requiring certain employers with more than 100 employees to implement a mandatory vaccination policy or otherwise have unvaccinated employees wear masks and undergo weekly COVID-19 testing. Judge Larsen's dissent argues that the United States Secretary of Labor "lacks the authority to issue" the vaccine mandate, and that OSHA's rule would run afoul of the major questions doctrine. On appeal, the U.S. Supreme Court agreed with Judge Larsen and stayed the OSHA rule.

== Electoral history ==
2016

Michigan Supreme Court – Partial Term Results, November 8, 2016
Party	Candidate	Votes	%
Republican	Joan Larsen (incumbent)	2,023,611	58.66%
Democratic	Deborah Thomas	976,660	28.31%
Libertarian	Kerry L. Morgan	449,221	13.02%
Majority		1,046,951	30.35%
Total votes		3,449,492	100.00%
Republican hold			

== See also ==
- List of law clerks for the ninth seat of the Supreme Court of the United States
- Donald Trump Supreme Court candidates

Legal offices
Preceded by Mary Beth Kelly	Associate Justice of the Michigan Supreme Court; 2015–2017	Succeeded by Elizabeth T. Clement
Preceded by David McKeague	Judge of the United States Court of Appeals for the Sixth Circuit; 2017–present	Incumbent
