= Megan Cavanagh (judge) =

American judge (born 1971)

Chief Justice of the Michigan Supreme Court
- Incumbent
- Assumed office April 15, 2025
- Preceded by: Elizabeth T. Clement

Justice of the Michigan Supreme Court
- Incumbent
- Assumed office January 1, 2019
- Preceded by: Kurtis T. Wilder

Personal details
- Born: Megan Kathleen Cavanagh; July 17, 1971 (age 55) Lansing, Michigan, U.S.
- Party: Democratic
- Relations: Michael Cavanagh (father) Jerome Cavanagh (uncle)
- Children: 2
- Education: University of Michigan (BSE); Wayne State University (JD)

Megan Kathleen Cavanagh (born July 17, 1971) is an American lawyer who has served as chief justice of the Michigan Supreme Court since April 2025 and concurrently as a justice since January 2019.

== Early life and education ==
Cavanagh was born in Lansing, Michigan, and educated in public schools. She was raised in a family immersed in the state politics of Michigan. Her father, Michael Cavanagh, served on the Michigan Supreme Court as Justice from 1983 to 2015 and as Chief Justice from 1991 to 1995. Her uncle, Jerome Cavanagh, served as the 64th mayor of Detroit from 1962 to 1970.

Cavanagh received a Bachelor of Science in Engineering degree from the University of Michigan in 1993 and a Juris Doctor degree from Wayne State University in 2000.

== Career ==
After law school, Cavanagh entered private practice and became a shareholder with Garan Lucow Miller P.C., where she specialized in appellate law. She served as a member of the Michigan Attorney Grievance Commission.

In the 2018 election, Cavanagh won a seat when she received the second-most votes for the Supreme Court, receiving 25.2 percent of the vote, and unseating Kurtis T. Wilder who came in third. The Democratic Party endorsed her candidacy. She was the first person to join their parent as a member of the Michigan Supreme Court since 1857.

In March 2025, Cavanagh was chosen by her fellow justices to become the new chief justice upon the resignation of Elizabeth Clement. She took office on April 15, 2025. In August 2026, she was nominated for re-election to the state Supreme Court by the Michigan Democratic Party.

== Personal life ==
Cavanagh lives in Birmingham, Michigan, and has two daughters.

== See also ==
- List of justices of the Michigan Supreme Court

Legal offices
| Preceded by Kurtis T. Wilder | Justice of the Michigan Supreme Court; 2019–present | Incumbent |
| Preceded by Elizabeth T. Clement | Chief Justice of the Michigan Supreme Court; 2025–present | Incumbent |
