= Traverse City Record-Eagle =

American newspaper in Michigan, founded 1858

- Type: Daily newspaper
- Format: Broadsheet
- Owner(s): CNHI
- Publisher: Paul J. Heidbreder
- Editor: Rebecca Pierce
- Founded: 1858 as the Grand Traverse Herald
- Headquarters: 120 West Front Street, Traverse City, Michigan 49685, United States
- Circulation: 17,209 Daily; 21,846 Sunday (as of 2022)
- Website: record-eagle.com

The Traverse City Record-Eagle is a daily morning newspaper based in Traverse City, Michigan. It calls itself "Northern Michigan's Newspaper" and is the newspaper of record for Grand Traverse County.

== History ==
The newspaper was owned by Dow Jones & Company, also publishers of the Wall Street Journal. On August 28, 2006, Dow Jones announced they were putting the Record-Eagle up for sale, and the paper eventually was purchased by CNHI.

The circulation area of the Record-Eagle covers much of northern Michigan, with a particular emphasis on counties adjacent to Greater Traverse City. In all it services 13 counties—namely Antrim, Benzie, Charlevoix, Cheboygan, Crawford, Emmet, Grand Traverse, Kalkaska, Leelanau, Manistee, Missaukee, Otsego and Wexford counties, and limited portions of neighboring counties—in the northwest lower peninsula.

Associated publications of The Record-Eagle include: community weekly North Coast; the monthly tabloid Grand Traverse Scene; a monthly real estate guide; and specialty sections throughout the year.

While the economy of Michigan as a whole has been characterized as stagnant or declining, the Traverse City area demonstrated significant population growth in the 2000s.

The Traverse City area's economy centers on four-season recreation, retirement living, tourism, higher education, and Native American gaming, and the newspaper covers these concerns. Their editorial board often writes aggressively on environmental issues, with a particular emphasis on the ecology of the Great Lakes, anti-development in the region and liberal political issues.

In October 2005, the Michigan Press Association named the Record-Eagle the "Newspaper of the Year" for newspapers with daily circulations between 15,001 and 40,000. In 2005, the Record-Eagle told the Media Management Center (Northwestern University) that its daily circulation was 29,341.

In 2006, Suburban Newspapers of America named the Record-Eagle's flagship Web site, Record-Eagle.com, the Best Community News Site in its class (newspapers with circulation under 40,000), and also awarded the site Best Site Architecture and Design.
