= Automatic ballot referral =

Type of referendum

An automatic ballot referral (or compulsory referral) is a type of referendum that is legally required to automatically be placed on a ballot. In the United States, many states have laws in their constitution requiring a question to hold a constitutional convention to appear before the voters after a scheduled amount of time.

== Types ==
=== Constitutional Convention ===
In the United States, fourteen states' constitutions state that they must give voters a chance to decide if they want to amend the constitution at set times.

State	Upcoming year of vote	Years between vote	Percent voted yes at last vote
Alaska	2022	10	32.3
Connecticut	2028	20	40.1
Hawaii	2028	10	23.7
Iowa	2020	10	32.8
Illinois	2028	20	32.6
Maryland	2030	20	48.1
Michigan	2026	16	33.4
Missouri	2022	20	34.7
Montana	2030	20	41.5
New Hampshire	2022	10	35.9
New York	2037	20	16
Ohio	2032	20	31.7
Oklahoma	2030 (Note: Oklahoma has not voted on a convention since 1970, even though the constitution states that they must be held every 20 years.)	20	23.7
Rhode Island	2024	10	44.9
