= Mary Beth Kelly =

American judge

Justice of the Michigan Supreme Court
- In office January 1, 2011 – October 1, 2015
- Preceded by: Alton Davis
- Succeeded by: Joan Larsen

Judge of the Third Circuit Court, Wayne County, Michigan
- In office 1999 – December 31, 2010
- Appointed by: John Engler

Personal details
- Party: Republican
- Education: University of Michigan–Dearborn (BA); Notre Dame Law School (JD)

Mary Beth Kelly is a lawyer and former justice of the Michigan Supreme Court. She was elected on November 2, 2010 to an eight-year term that would have ended on January 1, 2019. On August 17, 2015, she announced her resignation from the Supreme Court effective October 1, 2015, to return to private practice at Bodman PLC in Detroit.

== Education ==
Kelly received her undergraduate degree from the University of Michigan-Dearborn and her J.D. degree from Notre Dame Law School.

== Career ==
Prior to becoming a judge, Kelly worked in private practice. She joined law firm Dickinson Wright in 1987 and became a partner at the firm, where her work focused on commercial litigation.

She was appointed to the Third Circuit Court in 1999 by then-governor John Engler, where she served for 11 years. She became the first woman to serve as chief judge of that court when the Michigan Supreme Court appointed her to that position in 2002. She served as chief judge until 2007. During that time, the Family Division of the court doubled in size and she led efforts to improve the racial diversity of the jury system.

Since joining the Michigan Supreme Court in 2011, she served as chairperson of numerous statewide committees primarily focused on child welfare and family matters. In January 2015, governor Rick Snyder appointed her chair of the Michigan Committee on Juvenile Justice. She also served as co-chair of the Michigan Race Equity Coalition, which examined the need for the juvenile justice and foster care systems to improve policies and racial disparities through data.

After stepping down from the court in 2015, Kelly returned to private practice at Bodman PLC. As of August 2016, she served as vice chair of Bodman's Litigation and Alternative Dispute Resolution practice group.

== Elections ==
=== 2010 ===
Kelly won election to the Michigan Supreme Court on November 2, 2010. Though Michigan judicial elections are technically non-partisan, she was nominated by the Republican Party. She received the most votes of any of the five candidates for Supreme Court, defeating incumbent Democratic Justice Alton Davis.

== Notable opinions authored ==
Since joining the Michigan Supreme Court in 2011, Kelly authored the following notable opinions:

- In Stand Up for Democracy v. Secretary of State, she authored the lead opinion, which allowed a referendum of the Emergency Financial Manager law to appear on the ballot.
- In People v. Kolanek, she authored a unanimous opinion that was the first Supreme Court opinion to interpret the medical marijuana law.
- Her majority opinion in People v. Likine held that a defendant's inability to pay child support is not a defense to failure to pay child support, although the common-law defense of impossibility to pay still applied to that crime.
- Her dissenting opinion in People v. Carp would have applied retroactively the constitutional requirement that juvenile offenders must receive an individualized sentencing determination that considers the offender's youth, personal characteristics, and circumstances of the crime before being sentenced to life in prison without the possibility of parole.
