= Reproductive Freedom for All v. Board of State Canvassers =

Michigan Supreme Court decision

- Court: Michigan Supreme Court
- Full case name: Reproductive Freedom for All, Peter Bevier, and Jim Lederer v. Board of State Canvassers, Secretary of State, and Director of Elections and Citizens to Support MI Women and Children
- Decided: September 8, 2022

Court membership
- Judges sitting: Bridget Mary McCormack, Brian K. Zahra, David Viviano, Richard H. Bernstein, Elizabeth T. Clement, Megan Cavanagh, Elizabeth M. Welch

Case opinions
- Majority: McCormack, joined by Bernstein, Clement, Cavanagh, and Welch
- Concurrence: McCormack, Bernstein
- Dissent: Zahra, joined by Viviano

Keywords
- Abortion; Voting rights

Reproductive Freedom for All v. Board of State Canvassers was a 2022 decision by the Michigan Supreme Court overturning a decision by the Michigan Board of State Canvassers that had refused to certify a ballot petition, 2022 Michigan Proposal 3, concerning abortion rights. In a 5–2 decision, the Court granted a complaint for mandamus relief and ordered the Board to certify the petition and ordered the Michigan Secretary of State to include the ballot proposition on the Fall 2022 ballot.

== Background ==
In January 2022, Reproductive Freedom for All, in partnership with the ACLU of Michigan, Michigan Voices, and Planned Parenthood Advocates of Michigan, filed paperwork with the Board of State Canvassers to begin a ballot petition drive to amend the Constitution of Michigan to provide for a limited right to an abortion. The groups stated that their ballot proposition was driven by the fact that the U.S. Supreme Court was poised to overrule Roe v. Wade and, under pre-Roe state law, abortion would be illegal in Michigan. (Note: The U.S. Supreme Court ultimately overruled Roe v. Wade as expected in June 2022 in Dobbs v. Jackson Women's Health Organization. Enforcement of Michigan's pre-Roe ban on abortion was thereafter enjoined pending litigation over its enforceability.)

Under Michigan law, proponents of a ballot measure were required to obtain 425,059 signatures from registered Michigan voters. In July 2022, Reproductive Freedom for All submitted 753,759 signatures to the Secretary of State and requested that the ballot measure be added to the Fall 2022 ballot. However, despite meeting the requisite number of signatures, the Board of State Canvassers refused to certify the ballot proposition for the Fall 2022 ballot, with 2 Democratic members voting in favor of certification and 2 Republican members opposing certification. The Republican members argued that the proposition should not be on the ballot because the words on the proposition were placed too closely together and lacked a sufficient amount of "space" between words.

Reproductive Freedom for All thereafter filed a complaint for mandamus relief with the Michigan Supreme Court.

== Decision ==
On September 8, 2022, the Michigan Supreme Court issued a 5–2 decision in favor of Reproductive Freedom for All. The Court rejected the Board's argument that insufficient spacing had been used and criticized the Board as failing to perform its "clear legal duty to certify the petition". The Court thereafter directed the Board to certify the petition within 24 hours and directed the Secretary of State to include the ballot proposition on the Fall 2022 ballot.

Writing in concurrence, Chief Justice Bridget Mary McCormack noted that the proposition had garnered more signatures than any other ballot measure in Michigan's history and called the Board's refusal to certify the petition a "sad marker of the times". Chief Justice McCormack further wrote that the two Republican members of the Board had acted to "disenfranchise millions of Michiganders not because they believe the many thousands of Michiganders who signed the proposal were confused by it, but because they think they have identified a technicality that allows them to do so" and called their actions a "game of gotcha gone very bad".

Justice Richard H. Bernstein similarly concurred in the judgment and criticized Justice Zahra's dissent, noting that "As a blind person who is also a wordsmith and a member of this Court, I find it unremarkable to note that the lack of visual spacing has never mattered much to me."

Dissenting, Justice Brian K. Zahra criticized the Court's ruling as "ignor[ing] the requirements of the requirements of [Michigan] election law" and argued that the alleged lack of spacing between words violated Michigan's requirement that the "full text" of the proposition be provided to signers of the petition.

Justice David Viviano likewise issued a vigorous dissent. Justice Viviano argued that, while the petition contained "the right words in the right order . . . the lack of critical word spaces renders the remaining text much more difficult to read and comprehend, and therefore something less than the 'full text' required by the Constitution and statutes." Justice Viviano further wrote "In Western scripts, spatial organization is a determinative element in the effect of different transcription systems on the cognitive processes required for lexical access."

== Subsequent proceedings ==
Following the Court's decision, the Board of Canvassers certified the petition, allowing it to be included on the Fall 2022 ballot. Republican member of the Board, Tony Daunt, commented "Ultimately, the system works. It may be put under great stress at times, but it works."

== Reactions ==
Michigan Attorney General Dana Nessel and Secretary of State Jocelyn Benson released statements praising the Court's ruling.

Media reaction to the decision was generally positive, with commentators deriding the Board's initial refusal to certify the petition as anti-democratic and a sign of increasing polarization in the U.S. political environment.

== See also ==
- Abortion in Michigan
