= 2022 Michigan elections =

- November 8, 2022

The 2022 Michigan elections were held on Tuesday, November 8, 2022, throughout Michigan. The Democratic Party made historic gains, taking full control of state government for the first time since 1983 and marking a point where Democrats held all four elected statewide offices, both U.S. Senate seats, and both chambers of the Michigan Legislature. Democrats won control of the Michigan House of Representatives for the first time since 2008, and the Michigan Senate for the first time since 1984. Additionally, incumbent Democratic governor Gretchen Whitmer won reelection by a comfortable margin, with Democrats sweeping every statewide office. Furthermore, the Democrats maintained control of seven seats in the U.S. House of Representatives, while the Republican Party took a net loss of one seat (as the state lost one congressional seat due to reapportionment after the 2020 census). The elections in Michigan were widely characterized as a "blue wave".

== Federal ==
=== House of Representatives ===
Democrats won seven House seats in the United States House of Representatives, winning a majority of the House delegation to the Republicans six.

== Executive ==
=== Governor and lieutenant governor ===
Incumbent Democratic governor Gretchen Whitmer and Lieutenant Governor Garlin Gilchrist won re-election against Republicans Tudor Dixon and Shane Hernandez by a margin of 10.5%.

=== Secretary of state ===
Incumbent Democratic secretary of state Jocelyn Benson won re-election against Republican Kristina Karamo by a margin of 14%.

=== Attorney general ===
Incumbent Democratic attorney general Dana Nessel won re-election against Republican Matthew DePerno by a margin of 8.6%.

== Legislature ==
=== Senate ===
All 38 seats in the Michigan Senate were up for election in 2022. Democrats gained four seats, flipping the chamber for the first time since 1982.

=== House of Representatives ===
All 110 seats in the Michigan House of Representatives were up for election in 2022. Democrats gained three seats, flipping the chamber for the first time since 2008.

== Judiciary ==
=== Supreme Court ===
2022 Michigan Supreme Court election
- November 8, 2022

2 seats of the Supreme Court of Michigan
	Majority party	Minority party
Party	Democratic	Republican
Last election	4	3
Seats won	1	1
Seats after	4	3
Seat change	Steady	Steady

Two seats on the Michigan Supreme Court were up for election in 2022.

==== Candidates ====
- Richard H. Bernstein (Democratic), incumbent justice
- Kyra Harris Bolden (Democratic), state representative (2019–2023)
- Paul Hudson (Republican), attorney and chair of appeals group at Miller Canfield, P.L.C.
- Kerry Lee Morgan (Libertarian), attorney and perennial candidate
- Brian Zahra (Republican), incumbent justice

==== Results ====
2022 Michigan Supreme Court (2 seats) election
Party	Candidate	Votes	%
Nonpartisan	Richard H. Bernstein (incumbent)	2,120,661	33.90%
Nonpartisan	Brian Zahra (incumbent)	1,493,317	23.87%
Nonpartisan	Kyra Harris Bolden	1,368,652	21.88%
Nonpartisan	Paul Hudson	834,436	13.34%
Nonpartisan	Kerry Lee Morgan	438,595	7.01%
Total votes		6,255,661	100.0%
Democratic hold			
Republican hold			

Just weeks after the election, Michigan governor Gretchen Whitmer appointed Kyra Harris Bolden to the Supreme Court to replace Bridget Mary McCormack, who stepped down.

== Ballot initiatives ==
=== Proposal 1 ===
Proposal 1, the Legislative Term Limits and Financial Disclosure Amendment, was a legislatively-referred constitutional amendment which modified term limits in the Michigan state legislature. Previously, legislators were limited to serving three terms in the Michigan House of Representatives and two terms in the Michigan Senate. This proposal modified the limit to be a lifetime twelve-year limit for service across both chambers. The proposal also increased financial disclosure requirements for various elected officials. The proposal passed 66–34.

Legislative Term Limits and Financial Disclosure Amendment
Choice	Votes	%
For	2,838,540	66.45
Against	1,433,154	33.55
Total	4,271,694	100.00

=== Proposal 2 ===
Proposal 2, the Right to Voting Policies Amendment, was a citizen-initiated constitutional amendment which changed voting procedures in the state with the intent of making it easier for citizens to vote. The proposal passed 60–40.

Right to Voting Policies Amendment
Choice	Votes	%
For	2,586,255	59.99
Against	1,725,110	40.01
Total	4,311,365	100.00

=== Proposal 3 ===
Proposal 3, the Right to Reproductive Freedom Initiative, was a citizen-initiated constitutional amendment to protect the right to abortion and contraceptives in the state constitution. The proposal passed 57–43.

Right to Reproductive Freedom Initiative
Choice	Votes	%
For	2,482,382	56.66
Against	1,898,906	43.34
Total	4,381,288	100.00

== Issues ==
Issues occurred in a few locations with part of the Ottawa County Clerk's office losing power and requiring a backup generator, due to an error involving a construction crew that was working on nearby power lines, precincts in Ada Township temporarily running out of ballots, tabulator jams in Kent County due to ballots being marked in pen that had not dried, and long lines as polls were closing at City Hall in Grand Rapids. High turnout by college students led to long lines at polling places with polls on the campuses of the University of Michigan in Ann Arbor and Michigan State University in East Lansing staying open long after the polls closed at other places.
