= 2024 Michigan elections =

- November 5, 2024

The 2024 Michigan elections were held on November 5, 2024. In addition to the 2024 United States presidential election, elections were held for all of the state's seats in the United States House of Representatives, the state's class 1 seat in the United States Senate, and for all the seats in the Michigan House of Representatives. Elections to various local offices were also held.

== Federal ==
=== United States Senate ===
Incumbent Democratic Senator Debbie Stabenow retired, leaving an open seat. Democratic nominee Elissa Slotkin, U.S Representative from Michigan's 7th Congressional District, won the race against the Republican nominee, former Congressman Mike Rogers by a margin of 0.34%, narrowly holding the seat for the Democratic Party.

== Legislature ==
=== House of Representatives ===
All 110 seats in the Michigan House of Representatives are up for elections. Democrats currently have a majority with 56 seats, while Republicans hold 54 seats.

On December 21, 2023, a three-judge panel on the United States District Court for the Western District of Michigan ruled that 13 state legislative districts, including 7 state House districts, violated the Equal Protection Clause of the United States Constitution and needed to be redrawn.

== Judiciary ==
=== Supreme Court ===
2024 Michigan Supreme Court election
- November 5, 2024

2 seats of the Supreme Court of Michigan
	Majority party	Minority party
Party	Democratic	Republican
Last election	4	3
Seats won	2	0
Seats after	5	2
Seat change	▲1	▼1

Two seats were up for election to the Michigan Supreme Court. A full 8-year term seat was up, currently held by Justice David Viviano, and a partial 4-year term seat was up, currently held by Justice Kyra Harris Bolden.

==== Full term ====
2024 Michigan Supreme Court election (Full term)
- November 5, 2024
Candidate	Kimberly Thomas	Andrew Fink
Party	Nonpartisan	Nonpartisan
Popular vote	2,568,043	1,634,510
Percentage	61.11%	38.89%
- County results Thomas: 50–60% 60–70% 70–80% Fink: 50–60% 60–70%
Justice before election
David Viviano
Republican
Elected Justice
Kimberly Thomas
Democratic

Incumbent Justice David Viviano did not run for re-election.

===== Candidates =====
Kimberly Thomas was nominated unopposed at the Democratic convention. Andrew Fink defeated Michigan Court of Appeals Judge Mark Boonstra at the Republican convention.

- Andrew Fink, (Republican) state representative
- Kimberly Thomas (Democratic), law professor at University of Michigan Law School

===== Results =====
2024 Michigan Supreme Court election (Full term)
Party	Candidate	Votes	%
Nonpartisan	Kimberly Thomas	2,568,043	61.11%
Nonpartisan	Andrew Fink	1,634,510	38.89%
Total votes		4,202,553	100.0%
Democratic gain from Republican			

==== Term ending 1/1/2029 ====
2024 Michigan Supreme Court election (Term ending 1/1/2029)
- November 5, 2024
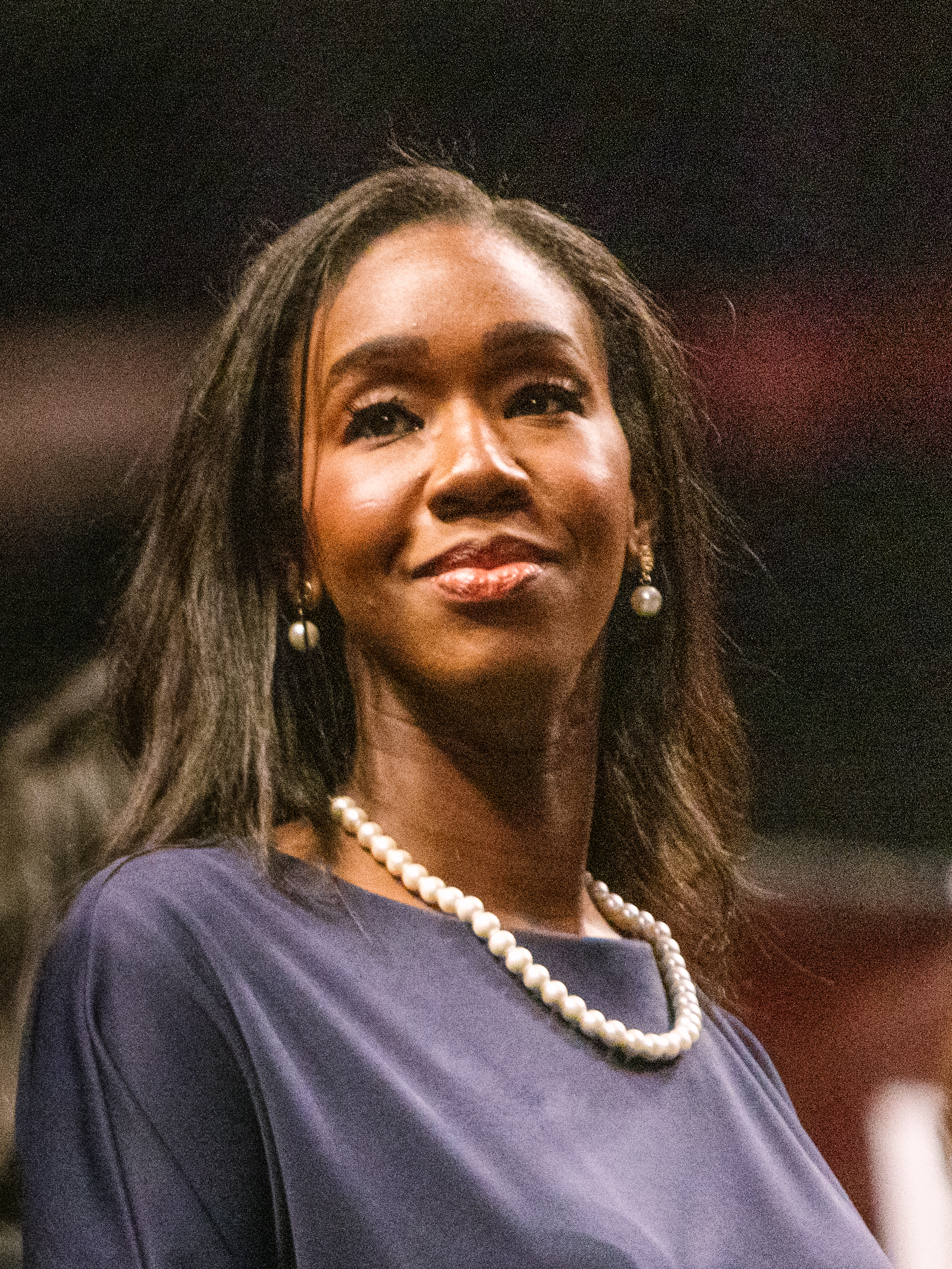

Candidate	Kyra Harris Bolden	Patrick O'Grady
Party	Nonpartisan	Nonpartisan
Popular vote	2,597,567	1,623,460
Percentage	61.54%	38.46%
- County results Bolden: 50–60% 60–70% 70–80% O'Grady: 50–60% 60–70%
Justice before election
Kyra Harris Bolden
Democratic
Elected Justice
Kyra Harris Bolden
Democratic

===== Candidates =====
Incumbent Justice Kyra Harris Bolden was nominated unopposed at the Democratic convention. Initially three candidates competed for the Republican nomination, but Matthew DePerno, the Republican nominee for Michigan Attorney General in 2022, dropped out the day before the convention. At the convention, Patrick O'Grady defeated adjunct law professor Alexandria Taylor.

- Kyra Harris Bolden (Democratic), incumbent Justice
- Patrick O'Grady (Republican), Judge of the 15th Circuit Court of Michigan (Branch County)

===== Results =====
2024 Michigan Supreme Court election (Term ending 1/1/2029)
Party	Candidate	Votes	%
Nonpartisan	Kyra Harris Bolden (incumbent)	2,597,567	61.54%
Nonpartisan	Patrick O'Grady	1,623,460	38.46%
Total votes		4,221,027	100.0%
Democratic hold			
