= Kyra Harris Bolden =

American judge (born 1988)

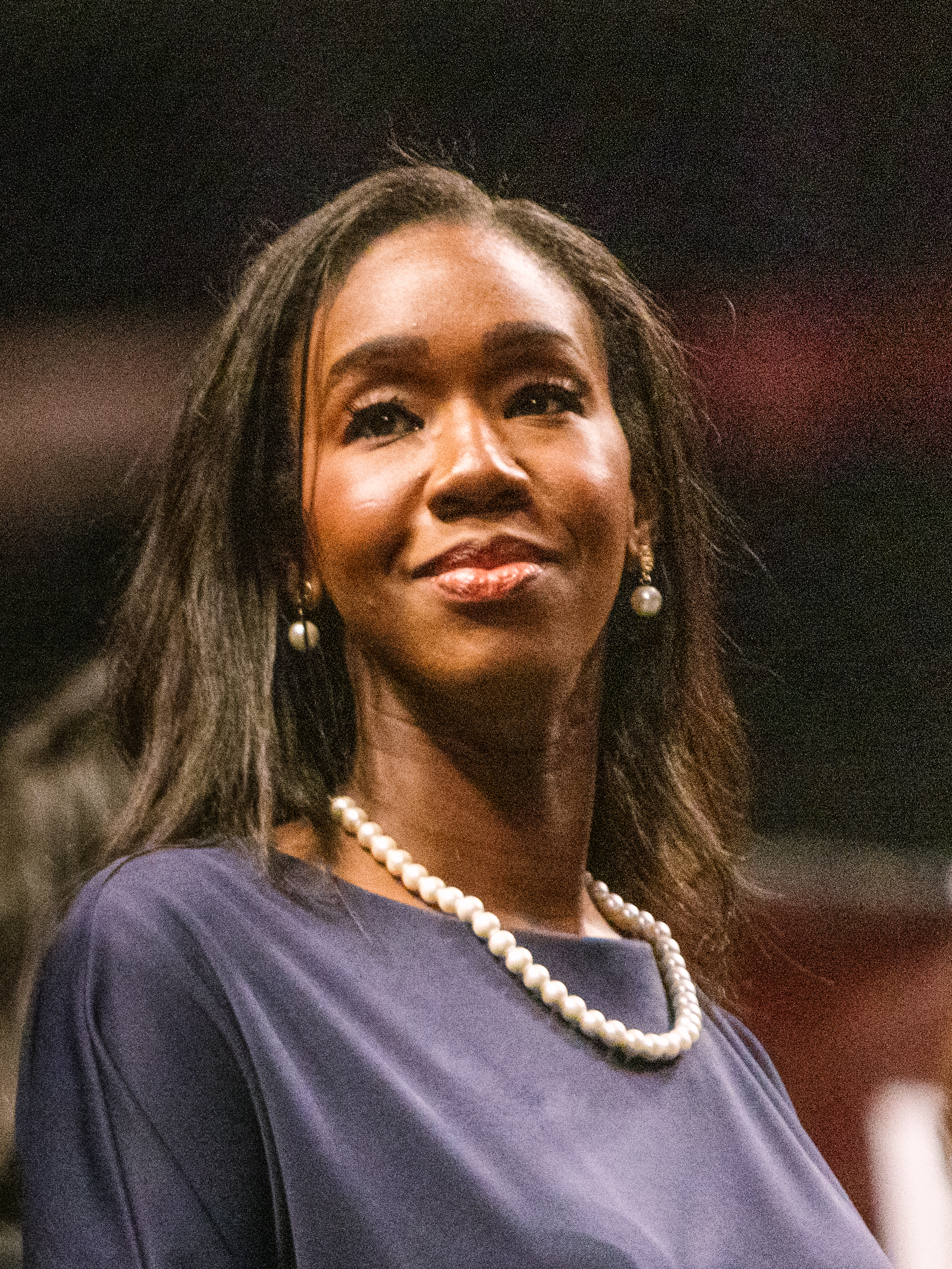
- Bolden in 2023

Associate Justice of the Michigan Supreme Court
- Incumbent
- Assumed office January 1, 2023
- Appointed by: Gretchen Whitmer
- Preceded by: Bridget Mary McCormack

Member of the Michigan House of Representatives from the 35th district
- In office January 1, 2019 – January 1, 2023
- Preceded by: Jeremy Moss
- Succeeded by: Andrew Fink

Personal details
- Born: July 31, 1988 (age 37) Southfield, Michigan, U.S.
- Party: Democratic
- Spouse: Greg Bolden
- Children: 1
- Education: Grand Valley State University (BA); University of Detroit Mercy (JD)
- Website: Campaign website

Kyra Harris Bolden (born July 31, 1988) is an American judge, politician, and civil litigation attorney. She has served as an associate justice of the Michigan Supreme Court since January 1, 2023. Bolden was a Democratic member of the Michigan House of Representatives for the 35th district from January 1, 2019 to January 1, 2023.

In her bid for re-election in 2020, Bolden faced Democratic primary challenger Shadia Martini. In the primary, Bolden defeated Martini by 20,981 votes. Bolden went on to be re-elected in the 2020 election, defeating Republican challenger Daniela Davis.

She was a candidate for the Michigan Supreme Court in 2022, but came in third behind incumbents Richard Bernstein and Brian Zahra. On November 22, 2022, Bolden was appointed to the Michigan Supreme Court by Governor Gretchen Whitmer to replace Bridget Mary McCormack.

== Early life and education ==
A graduate of Southfield Public Schools, Bolden chose to remain in Michigan for her studies, receiving her bachelor's degree from Grand Valley State University and Juris Doctor from the University of Detroit Mercy School of Law.

== Career ==
While working in Lansing, Bolden advocated for Michiganders as a member of the Judiciary Committee and focused her work on criminal justice reform, crafting and passing bipartisan legislation to protect survivors of sexual violence. Bolden passed the “Medically Frail” prison reform package, the revision of the Wrongful Imprisonment Compensation Act, and the “Address Confidentiality for Survivors of Domestic Violence” package.

=== Michigan Supreme Court ===
On November 22, 2022, Bolden was appointed to the Michigan Supreme Court by Governor Gretchen Whitmer to replace Bridget Mary McCormack. Bolden is the first Black woman to serve on the Michigan Supreme Court. Bolden's qualifications for the Supreme Court were that in addition to serving in the legislature for 4 years, she also handled misdemeanor court appointed cases in the 46th District Court sometime between 2014 and 2018.

==== Controversies ====
In 2023, Michigan Supreme Court Justice Richard H. Bernstein drew controversy after Bolden hired Pete Martel, who spent fourteen years in prison for armed robbery before attending Wayne State University Law School, as a law clerk. Bernstein publicly stated that he was "completely disgusted" by Bolden's decision to hire Martel as a law clerk and claimed that he and Justice Bolden "don't share the same values". He also claimed that Bolden's decision to hire Martel would reflect poorly on the entire court and that it was not "fair to the police and the prosecutors" to have a convicted felon working for the court. Bolden confirmed that Martel had resigned from his position as a law clerk due to Bernstein's comments and explained that Martel "did not want to be a distraction or in any way divert the court from its important work". On January 9, 2023 Bernstein issued a statement saying he apologized to Bolden in person at the Hall of Justice and that she accepted his apology.

== Affiliations ==
Bolden has received several awards, including the 2019 Detroit Association of Women's Clubs, Inc. “Young Women Lifting As We Climb Image Award”, 2019 African American Leadership Awards “Emerging Leader Award”, 2020 Michigan Chronicle 40 Under 40 honoree, 2021 Legislative Economic Development Champion Award and the 2021 Michigan Credit Union League “Legislator of the Year” award.

Bolden is a member of the Oakland County Bar Association, Wolverine Bar Association, Straker Bar Association, the Women Lawyers Association of Michigan, National Congress of Black Women-Oakland County, Alpha Kappa Alpha sorority, and as a member of the Total Living Commission for the City of Southfield.

== Personal life ==
Bolden lives in her hometown of Southfield with her husband, Dr. Greg Bolden, and daughter Emerson Portia Bolden.

== Electoral history ==
2018 Michigan House of Representatives general election, 35th district
Party	Candidate	Votes	%
Democratic	Kyra Harris Bolden	40,606	85.45%
Republican	Theodore Alfonsetti III	6,912	14.55%
Total votes		47,518	100.0
Democratic hold			

2020 Michigan House of Representatives general election, 35th district
Party	Candidate	Votes	%
Democratic	Kyra Harris Bolden	49,096	82.93
Republican	Daniela Davis	9,412	15.90
Libertarian	Tim Yow	693	1.17
Total votes		59,201	100.0
Democratic hold			

2022 Michigan Supreme Court (2 seats) election
Party	Candidate	Votes	%
Nonpartisan	Richard H. Bernstein (incumbent)	2,120,661	33.90%
Nonpartisan	Brian Zahra (incumbent)	1,493,317	23.87%
Nonpartisan	Kyra Harris Bolden	1,368,652	21.88%
Nonpartisan	Paul Hudson	834,436	13.34%
Nonpartisan	Kerry Lee Morgan	438,595	7.01%
Total votes		6,255,661	100.0%
Democratic hold			
Republican hold			

2024 Michigan Supreme Court special election (Term ending 1/1/2029)
Party	Candidate	Votes	%
Nonpartisan	Kyra Harris Bolden (incumbent)	2,597,567	61.54%
Nonpartisan	Patrick O'Grady	1,623,460	38.46%
Total votes		4,221,027	100.0%
Democratic hold			

== See also ==
- List of African-American jurists

Political offices
Preceded by Jeremy Moss	Member of the Michigan House of Representatives from the 35th district 2019–2023	Succeeded by Andrew Fink
Legal offices
Preceded by Bridget Mary McCormack	Associate Justice of the Michigan Supreme Court; 2023–present	Incumbent
