= Diane Hathaway =

American judge (born 1954)

Associate Justice of the Michigan Supreme Court
- In office January 1, 2009 – January 21, 2013
- Preceded by: Clifford Taylor
- Succeeded by: David Viviano

Personal details
- Born: February 28, 1954 (age 72)
- Party: Democratic

Diane Marie Hathaway (born February 28, 1954) is a former Justice of the Michigan Supreme Court and a convicted felon. Hathaway, a Democrat, was elected on November 4, 2008, to an 8-year term which commenced in January 2009. Hathaway retired from the court effective January 21, 2013, after being charged with felony criminal mortgage fraud, to which she pleaded guilty on January 29, 2013, and was sentenced to a year in prison.

== Early life and career ==
Hathaway was born and raised in Detroit, where her father was a city police officer. She attended the Henry Ford Hospital School of Radiological Technology from 1972 to 1974, before attending Wayne State University from 1980 to 1981. Hathaway later earned a BS in health from Madonna College, where she graduated with honors in 1983.

Hathaway went on to receive a Juris Doctor degree from the Detroit College of Law (now Michigan State University College of Law) in 1987. While attending law school, Hathaway served as a research clerk in the Detroit Recorder's Court, and then in the Circuit Court. After passing the bar, she served as a public attorney from 1987 to 1993, first as a Macomb County Assistant Prosecutor, and then as Chief of the Drug Forfeiture Division.

Hathaway earned a Real Estate Salesperson license in Michigan in 1987 and a Real Estate Broker license in 1990. According to her Supreme Court biography, she has taught Continuing Education and Real Estate Law classes for other licensees.

In November 1992, Hathaway was elected judge of the Wayne County Circuit Court, 3rd Judicial Circuit, and served from 1993 until 2009, when she was elevated to Michigan Supreme Court Justice.

In 2006, Hathaway mounted an unsuccessful campaign for a seat on the state Court of Appeals. She finished third behind two sitting judges.

Hathaway is married to attorney Michael J. Kingsley.

Hathaway's annual compensation for her work on the Supreme Court was $164,610.

Hathaway was the first sitting Michigan Supreme Court Justice to be charged with a crime in nearly 40 years. In 1975, former Michigan Governor and Supreme Court Justice John Swainson was acquitted of bribery, but served a short sentence for perjury committed before a federal grand jury.

== Supreme Court candidacy and election ==
With the support of unions including the Michigan Education Association, the AFL-CIO, and the United Auto Workers, Hathaway was nominated at the Michigan Democratic Party's summer convention, and announced her candidacy for the state Supreme Court in September 2008. Hathaway ran for the seat held by the conservative incumbent Chief Justice of the Court, Cliff Taylor. Her campaign echoed the "change" theme of other state and national candidates during the 2008 election cycle, and Hathaway's negative advertising strategy focused on a controversial charge that Taylor had been caught napping on the bench while arguments were being heard. Regarding Taylor, Hathaway was quoted as saying "If you see justice in the name, he really belongs in the hall of shame."

Hathaway's stunning defeat of Taylor by 10 percentage points marked the first time an incumbent judge had been unseated in Michigan in nearly 25 years, and the first time in history that a sitting Supreme Court justice had been defeated in a re-election bid. On January 9, 2009, Hathaway was sworn in as the 104th justice of the court, being the seventh woman seated over the court's history. Among those attending the investiture ceremony were family members, including Hathaway's former sister-in-law Judge Amy Hathaway of Wayne County's 3rd Circuit Court.

Hathaway's time on the court was mainly highlighted by the reversal of decisions reached under the Taylor court, particularly in cases involving personal injury and insurance company liability.

== Mortgage fraud ==
Beginning in May 2012, Hathaway's personal real estate dealings became the subject of growing media scrutiny after WXYZ-TV's Ross Jones reported on the recent shuffling of Hathaway properties in Michigan and Florida. Justice Hathaway declined to answer Jones's questions concerning her property transactions on camera. The Associated Press soon picked up the story. It was reported that "The chief justice of the Michigan Supreme Court (Robert P. Young, Jr.) called on a fellow justice (Hathaway) to 'clear the air' Thursday after a TV station said she put real estate in relatives' names while trying to persuade a bank to allow a short sale on a separate home."

It was claimed that after the hardship sale of her lakefront home (reportedly mortgaged for $1.5 million) in Grosse Pointe Park was finalized, Hathaway put another home — a debt-free property in Windermere, Florida, valued at about $644,000 — back into her name. The short sale of the Grosse Pointe home allegedly allowed Hathaway to avoid foreclosure proceedings and walk away from $600,000 in mortgage debt.

Before the short sale, Hathaway transferred another Grosse Pointe Park home on Windmill Pointe Drive to her stepson, Michael Kingsley (Michigan attorney P15984), with no significant funds changing hands.

A third Grosse Pointe Park home, purchased for $195,000 in cash by Hathaway's stepdaughter Sarah Kingsley, was also transferred into Hathaway's name after the short sale in question. No money changed hands in the "sale" of that Balfour Street home to Hathaway, which would become, and remains, Hathaway's reported personal residence. Sarah Kingsley reportedly pursued a separate short sale on a home in Grosse Pointe Woods at the time of her cash purchase on Balfour, raising questions as to the source of the funds used by Sarah Kingsley to make the initial purchase on Balfour.

Sometime after the beginning of WXYZ's investigation, Hathaway reportedly became the subject of an FBI probe as a Grand Jury was reportedly empaneled. The Detroit Free Press quoted former Detroit FBI chief Andrew Arena as saying "This (home swapping) is a plausible scheme. It is one that I've seen in the past," adding "It's a shell game -- you move properties around."

Hathaway also reportedly became the subject of at least one filing with the state's Judicial Tenure Commission, which is responsible for investigating allegations of impropriety by, and leveling formal complaints against, sitting judges.

According to the News, Hathaway "took a continuing education course in short sales and foreclosures the same month the bank began foreclosure proceedings on the home on Lakeview Court (the subject of the short sale)."

=== Forfeiture action ===
On November 20, the Detroit News reported that the federal government was seeking forfeiture of the Florida home in question. The case was filed in the Eastern District of Michigan on November 19.

In the civil complaint, U.S. Attorney Barbara L. McQuade charged that Hathaway and her husband, Michael J. Kingsley, "systematically and fraudulently transferred property and hid assets in order to support their claim to (ING Direct) that they did not have the financial resources to pay the mortgage on the Michigan property."

The News discussed strong indications that Hathaway was planning to resign from the court, but also noted that her office denied those claims, and that her attorney of record Steven Fishman stated that he knew nothing of any resignation plan.

Another report stated that Hathaway had already cleaned out her personal effects from the Michigan Hall of Justice.

On November 21, it was widely reported that Fishman stated that Hathaway and Kingsley would fight to keep the Florida home, as well as her seat on the high court. Fishman declined to comment directly on the pending forfeiture action.

=== Political and editorial comment ===
Demands for Hathaway's resignation included those from Michigan GOP spokesman Matt Frendeway, and conservative Detroit radio personality and Detroit News columnist Frank Beckmann, who suggested a possible political angle in the treatment of the Hathaway case, noting that Hathaway is a Democrat, U.S. Attorney McQuade was appointed by the Obama Administration, and that McQuade to date pursued civil forfeiture rather than criminal charges against Hathaway and Kingsley. The editors of the News also called for Hathaway's resignation. The editor of the Livingston County Daily Press & Argus suggested that Hathaway either "clear the air," or fight the allegations "as a private citizen." Long-time Michigan political analyst Tim Skubick called Justice Hathaway's protracted silence on the accusations "deafening."

Michigan State Senate Democratic Leader Gretchen Whitmer of East Lansing told the News "If the allegations are true, then she (Hathaway) should step down."

=== Hathaway and Kingsley respond ===
On November 30, WXYZ's Jones reported that Hathaway and Kingsley had filed a response to the forfeiture action, and that "Hathaway denied the allegations, but did acknowledge that she and her husband did not tell their bank, ING, that they had recently transferred the property out of their names, and into a stepdaughter’s."

The News reported that in the court filing, attorney Fishman wrote, "[C]laimants, with the assistance of their lawyer, provided the information that was requested by ING in its 'Customer Information Summary,' which did not include any questions about property that had been recently transferred," and, "In fact, ING knew about and inquired about the defendant property during the 'short sale' process and either did learn or could easily have learned about the property transfer. Whether ING did or did not learn about the property transfer, it is obvious that the transfer had no impact on ING's decision to approve the short sale."

=== 90-day stay ===
On December 19, it was reported that Hathaway and Kingsley, as well as the federal government, had agreed to a 90-day stay on the forfeiture action. A report in the News cited expert speculation that the stay might be a maneuver allowing Hathaway time to resolve potential criminal charges, and to resign from the bench. U.S. Attorney McQuade's spokesperson called the 3-month delay "standard procedure."

== Retirement from Supreme Court ==
On January 7, 2013, WXYZ's Ross Jones, the News, and the Free Press each reported that Hathaway would retire from the Michigan Supreme Court effective January 21. Hathaway's announcement came through her attorneys Steven Fishman and Brian Einhorn after a scathing litany of charges related to the alleged mortgage fraud were detailed within a recommendation by the state Judicial Tenure Commission that Hathaway be placed under immediate suspension. That report called Hathaway's actions "blatant and brazen" violations of judicial ethical conduct. The allegations against Hathaway, and the complaint by the JTC itself, were called "unprecedented" in Michigan Supreme Court history. The Hathaway legal team, however, contended that the JTC brought action only to "pander to the press," and to "embarrass and humiliate" Hathaway, as Hathaway had, in fact, submitted her notice of retirement with the state on December 20, 2012, and also informed the JTC of her decision to leave the bench verbally on December 21, and in writing December 26.

The News, reporting on January 8, depicted Hathaway's "exit strategy" unfavorably, calling her December 20 retirement filing "secret," and indicating that she failed to notify her fellow justices of her retirement decision until after the JTC report was released. Hathaway was given 14 days to respond to the JTC complaint, but the complaint will have no official weight after her departure, although the JTC could censure Hathaway. When asked by the News, attorney Fishman declined to cite the JTC complaint, or any other rationale, as the basis for Hathaway's untimely mid-term exit from the high court.

It was reported that Justice Hathaway would not participate in any court proceedings pending her retirement.

== Federal criminal bank fraud charged ==
On January 18, 2013, federal prosecutors filed a felony bank fraud charge against Hathaway, only days prior to her exit from the state's highest court. The charge carries a maximum penalty of 30 years imprisonment, although the AP reported that the charge was filed as "criminal information," indicating that a deal had been negotiated with Hathaway (to enter a guilty plea). Michael Kingsley was not named in the filing, which was entered by the White Collar Crimes unit within U.S. Attorney Barbara McQuade's office.

WXYZ's Ross Jones, who broke the Hathaway story in May 2012, reported "[t]he document laying out the charge against Hathaway says she 'executed a scheme to defraud ING and to obtain money and funds owned by and under the control of ING by means of materially false and fraudulent pretenses and representations.' "

The News cited expert speculation that Hathaway would probably serve some portion of the 27 to 33 months recommended under sentencing guidelines. Former federal prosecutor Peter Henning told the News, "What kind of message would be sent if she gets no prison time while someone who steals thousands of dollars from a bank (an armed bank robber) goes to jail?" Fox 2 News quoted former FBI agent Andrew Arena as saying, "I think the hammer's gonna fall (on Hathaway)."

AP reported that the case will be heard by Clinton Administration appointee U.S. District Judge John Corbett O'Meara in Ann Arbor. On January 21, WXYZ reported that Hathaway could appear before Judge O'Meara as early as January 22.

=== Arraignment ===
On January 22, it was reported that Hathaway was scheduled to appear for arraignment before Judge O'Meara on January 29 at 10:30am. Reports reiterated the expectation that Hathaway would enter a guilty plea as part of a deal with federal prosecutors.

=== Attorney General calls on Attorney Grievance Commission ===
On January 24, Detroit media outlets reported that Michigan Attorney General Bill Schuette had sought an investigation of Hathaway's real estate dealings by the Attorney Grievance Commission, the state's official lawyer watchdog agency. "The conduct described in the JTC Complaint raises serious questions as to Ms. Hathaway's fitness to practice law," Schuette was quoted as saying. Because Hathaway's law license would be automatically suspended upon an expected guilty plea to the felony charge she already faced, Hathaway's attorney Steven Fishman called Schuette's action "piling on."

=== Statement of the Chief Justice of the Michigan Supreme Court ===
WXYZ's Jones reported that Michigan Supreme Court Chief Justice Robert P. Young, Jr. issued the following statement regarding the charge against Hathaway:

"When any elected official is charged with serious misconduct, the public’s faith in its government institutions can suffer. The federal criminal fraud charges levied against Justice Hathaway and her departure from the Supreme Court bring to a close an unhappy, uncharacteristic chapter in the life of this Court. The last eight months have cast an unfortunate shadow over the Court. Going forward, my five fellow justices and I, and this Court as an institution, will do what we have always strived to do: to uphold the highest ethical standards, render the best public service in promoting the rule of law for everyone, and do our utmost to deserve the trust the public has placed in us."

== Guilty plea ==
On January 29, 2013, Hathaway entered a guilty plea on one federal count of felony bank fraud before Judge O'Meara. She was not immediately detained, and a sentencing date of May 28 was set. It was expected that she would face penalties ranging from likely probation to some portion of the maximum 18 months imprisonment stipulated under the agreement. In addition, fines and restitution to be determined by the court could total over $100,000. Hathaway and Kingsley would not, however, be forced to forfeit their Windermere, Florida home as part of the settlement, thereby closing the civil case against that property. The former justice also agreed not to appeal O'Meara's sentence as part of the plea deal. Hathaway faced potential regulatory action against her law and real estate licenses.

== David Viviano appointed to fill Hathaway's seat ==
On February 27, 2013, Michigan Governor Rick Snyder appointed Macomb County Chief Circuit Judge David Viviano to replace Diane Hathaway on the Michigan Supreme Court.

== Prison sentence and release ==
On May 28, 2013, Hathaway appeared before Judge O'Meara in Ann Arbor and was sentenced to 366 days in federal prison. Hathaway walked free from the courtroom. Speaking at length for the first time since her guilty plea, Hathaway reportedly said, "Your Honor, I stand before you a broken person."

The government's sentencing brief was published by the Detroit Free Press.

On August 13, 2013, Hathaway began serving her sentence at the Federal Correctional Facility at Alderson, West Virginia, otherwise known as "Camp Cupcake" due to the comparatively favorable conditions at the minimum security prison, which houses females found guilty of federal crimes. The ranks of former inmates of the camp range from jazz legend Billie Holiday and would-be presidential assassins Sara Jane Moore and Lynette "Squeaky" Fromme, to homemaking mogul Martha Stewart.

On April 29, 2014, the Detroit News reported that Judge O'Meara had denied Hathaway's request for early release. Hathaway was scheduled for release on June 26, 2014. On May 22, 2014, WXYZ's Ross Jones reported that Hathaway had been released from prison.
