= 2004 Michigan elections =

- November 2, 2004

The 2004 Michigan elections were held in the U.S. state of Michigan on November 2, 2004. The state primary was held on August 3.

== Federal ==
=== Presidential caucuses ===
The Democratic presidential caucus was held on February 7, 2004, in Michigan. John Kerry won the state. Kerry would go on to win the Democratic nomination nationally. There was no Republican presidential caucus or primary held in Michigan. Incumbent Republican president George W. Bush would be renominated nationally.

=== Presidential general election ===
Democratic nominee John Kerry won Michigan in the presidential general election. All 17 of Michigan's electoral votes went to Kerry. Incumbent Republican president George W. Bush would win re-election nationally.

=== U.S. House of Representatives election ===
There were 9 Republicans and 6 Democrats elected to the U.S. House of Representatives from Michigan. This maintained the previous partisan makeup of Michigan's House delegation.

== Legislature ==
=== State House of Representative election ===
Before the election, Republicans held a 63–47 majority in the state House. After the election, the Republicans' majority over the Democrats was weakened to 58–52.

== Judiciary ==
=== Supreme Court ===
Incumbent Republican justice Stephen Markman and incumbent Democratic justice Marilyn Jean Kelly both won re-election, preserving the 5–2 Republican majority on the court.

== Michigan State Board of Education and University boards ==
=== Michigan State Board of Education ===
Incumbent Democrats Herb Moyer and Marianne McGuire sought re-election. McGuire was re-elected, but Moyer was defeated by Republican Nancy Danhof. This weakened the Democratic majority over Republicans on the board to 5–3.

=== Michigan State University Board of Trustees ===
Incumbents Democrat Joel Ferguson and Republican Randall Pittman sought re-election. Ferguson was re-elected, but Pittman lost re-election to fellow Republican Melanie Foster. This maintained the 5–3 Republican majority on the board.

=== University of Michigan Board of Regents ===
Incumbent Democrats Olivia Maynard and S. Martin Taylor were re-elected. This maintained the 5–3 Democratic majority on the board.

=== Wayne State University Board of Governors ===
Incumbents Republican Paul Hillegonds and Democrat Annetta Miller sought re-election. Miller was re-elected, but Hillegonds was defeated by Democrat Tina Abbott. This increased the Democratic majority on the board to 6–2.

== Ballot initiatives ==
=== State ballot proposals ===
There were two state constitutional amendment ballot proposals in Michigan on November 2, 2004. Both were approved. Proposal 1 required that new gambling operations gain voter approval. Proposal 2 banned gay marriage.

== Local elections ==
The following is an incomplete list of 2004 elections in notable localities.

=== Oakland County Executive election ===
Incumbent Republican Oakland County Executive L. Brooks Patterson was re-elected.
