= Clifford Taylor =

American judge

Clifford W. Taylor

66th Chief Justice of the Michigan Supreme Court
- In office January 7, 2005 – January 1, 2009
- Preceded by: Maura D. Corrigan
- Succeeded by: Marilyn Jean Kelly

Justice of the Michigan Supreme Court
- In office September 22, 1997 – January 1, 2009
- Appointed by: John Engler
- Preceded by: Dorothy Comstock Riley
- Succeeded by: Diane Marie Hathaway

Personal details
- Born: November 9, 1942 (age 83) Flint, Michigan, U.S.
- Party: Republican
- Spouse: Lucille
- Children: 2 sons
- Education: University of Michigan (B.A., 1964); George Washington University (J.D., 1967)

Military service
- Allegiance: United States of America
- Branch/service: Navy
- Years of service: 1967–1971

Clifford Woodworth "Cliff" Taylor (born November 9, 1942) is a former American judge who served on the Michigan Supreme Court from 1997 through 2009. He served as the Michigan Supreme Court's Chief Justice from 2005 through 2009. After his tenure as a judge, he joined the law firm of Miller, Canfield, Paddock & Stone and served as a visiting law professor at Ave Maria School of Law.

== Michigan Supreme Court ==
Taylor was appointed to the court in 1997 by then-Governor John Engler, ran for election to the balance of the appointed term in 1998 and was reelected in 2000. He was chosen by his fellow justices to be the Chief Justice twice, in 2005 and 2007.

Wayne County Circuit Judge Diane Marie Hathaway defeated Justice Taylor in the 2008 Supreme Court election.

After Taylor's defeat in the election, the Court chose Marilyn Jean Kelly to succeed him as chief justice.

== Personal ==
Taylor is a graduate of the University of Michigan and The George Washington University. He is chairman of the board of directors of the Mackinac Center for Public Policy. He is married to Lucille Taylor, with whom he has two sons.

Party political offices
Preceded by Robert Hardy Cleland	Republican nominee for Michigan Attorney General; 1990	Succeeded by John Smietanka
