= Maura D. Corrigan =

American judge

Maura Corrigan

Director of the Michigan Department of Human Services
- In office January 14, 2011 – December 31, 2014
- Appointed by: Rick Snyder
- Deputy: Duane Berger
- Succeeded by: Nick Lyon

65th Chief Justice of the Michigan Supreme Court
- In office 2001–2004
- Preceded by: Elizabeth A. Weaver
- Succeeded by: Clifford W. Taylor

Justice of the Michigan Supreme Court
- In office January 1, 1999 – January 14, 2011
- Preceded by: Patricia Boyle
- Succeeded by: Brian K. Zahra

Personal details
- Born: June 14, 1948 (age 78) Cleveland, Ohio
- Party: Republican
- Education: Marygrove College; University of Detroit Law School (JD)
- Website: Official website

Maura Denise Corrigan (born June 14, 1948) is the former director of the Michigan Department of Human Services. She was also a justice of the Michigan Supreme Court, serving from 1998 to 2011 and as chief justice from 2001 to 2004.

== Biography ==
She graduated from Marygrove College in Detroit, Michigan in 1969 and earned her Juris Doctor degree from the University of Detroit Law School in 1973. While in law school, she worked as a probation officer at a Detroit court.

Her first job after law school was with the Michigan Court of Appeals, where she served as a law clerk to Judge John Gillis. She next worked as a Wayne County assistant prosecutor. In 1979, she became an assistant U.S. Attorney, serving as chief of appeals; she later became the first woman to serve as chief assistant U.S. Attorney. In 1989, she became a partner at the Detroit law firm of Plunkett & Cooney. In 1992, Governor John Engler appointed her to the Michigan Court of Appeals. She was twice elected to that court and served as its chief judge from 1997 to 1998.

Corrigan is a long-time member of the Federalist Society, Michigan Lawyers Chapter. She was also president of The Incorporated Society of Irish-American Lawyers and of the Federal Bar Association, Detroit Chapter.

A member of the Pew Commission on Children in Foster Care, Corrigan has been recognized for her work on foster care and adoption issues, including The Detroit News' "Michiganian of the Year" award.

== Philosophy ==
She has supported several of George W. Bush's nominees to the United States Court of Appeals for the Sixth Circuit which includes the state of Michigan. She had this to say about nominee Richard A. Griffin:

I have known Judge Griffin since 1992, when I first joined the Michigan Court of Appeals. I was fortunate to hear cases on panels with Judge Griffin on many occasions during my seven years as a Court of Appeals judge. Judge Griffin is intellectually gifted. He is a spirited questioner who 'cuts to the chase'. He is consistently well-prepared for oral argument and offers incisive views on the assigned cases to his colleagues.

Corrigan had been mentioned as a potential nominee to the Supreme Court following the announced retirement of Sandra Day O'Connor and the withdrawal of Harriet Miers, and before President Bush's nomination of Samuel Alito. Jan Crawford Greenburg recounted in her history of contemporary Supreme Court nominations that Corrigan declined to be considered for a vacancy because she did not desire to go through the ordeal of the nomination and confirmation process.

Corrigan advocates the judicial philosophy of textualism, which "promotes adherence to the actual text of statutes". In an article in the New York University Annual Survey of American Law, Corrigan argued that resort to history in interpreting a statute is a form of "dice loading".

== Personal life ==
Corrigan has two children, and five grand children. She was the wife of the late lawyer, Joe Grano.

== Michigan Department of Human Services ==
The Michigan Department of Human Services (DHS) is the state's second-largest agency. The DHS oversees almost 12,000 employees and has an annual budget of more than $6 billion to administer federal programs.

The DHS staff handles more than 1.5 million medical assistance cases and approximately 1.7 million cash and food-assistance cases all across Michigan. It oversees Michigan's child and adult protective services, foster care, adoptions, juvenile justice, domestic violence, and child-support programs. The DHS also licenses adult foster care, child day care and child welfare facilities.

In 2011 she caused major controversy in cutting students' access to food benefits. She also made headlines with statements about students' work ethic and their access to jobs.

As DHS Director she oversaw the state's Childhood Lead Poisoning Prevention Program during the Flint water crisis.

== Board positions ==
Corrigan sits on the board of research organization Child Trends.

== See also ==
- George W. Bush Supreme Court candidates
