= Dickinson Wright =

National law firm based in Detroit, United States

- Headquarters: Detroit, Michigan
- No. of offices: 23
- No. of attorneys: over 550+
- Major practice areas: Corporate, Intellectual Property, Finance, Immigration
- Key people: Michael C. Hammer, CEO; William T. Burgess, Chairman
- Date founded: 1878
- Founder: Henry Munroe Campbell and Henry Russel
- Company type: Professional Limited Liability Company
- Website: www.dickinsonwright.com

Founded in Detroit, Michigan, in 1878, Dickinson Wright has grown to over 500+ attorneys across more than 40 practice areas and industries. The firm maintains 23 offices throughout the United States and Canada, including six in Michigan In the National Law Journal’s 2025 NLJ 500 ranking of the largest U.S. law firms by headcount, Dickinson Wright ranks 106nd.

== History ==
Early Years (1878–1930s)

Dickinson Wright traces its origins to 1878, when Henry Munroe Campbell and Henry Russel established the firm in Detroit to serve the city’s growing banking and railroad industries.

Members of the firm contributed to the drafting of Michigan’s 1908 and 1963 state constitutions. During the 1933 national banking crisis, the firm helped organize the federally funded National Bank of Detroit (now part of JPMorgan Chase & Co.), which played a central role in restoring stability to Michigan’s financial system.

Mid-Century Contributions

Throughout the 20th century, Dickinson Wright attorneys were active in legislative drafting. They were involved in shaping the Michigan Financial Institutions Act of 1937, the Intangibles Tax Act, the Community Property Tax Act of 1948, and the Industrial Facilities Tax Act of 1974. Firm lawyers also regularly held judicial and governmental appointments, including multiple justices on the Michigan Supreme Court.

Expansion Beyond Michigan (1970s–2000s)

The firm’s first office outside Detroit opened in Lansing in 1970, followed by Washington, D.C. in 1978, and Grand Rapids in 1989. Ann Arbor was added in 2000, and by the end of the decade, Dickinson Wright had entered Nashville, Phoenix, and Toronto. In the late 1980s and early 1990s, the firm adapted to the influx of Japanese investment in the Detroit area by hiring Japanese-speaking attorneys and staff, launching a Japanese-language newsletter, and hosting seminars for Japanese companies operating in Michigan.

International and U.S. Growth (2010s–Present)

The firm’s cross-border presence expanded in 2011 when its Ontario affiliate combined with Toronto-based Aylesworth LLP, a firm with roots dating back to 1861. Two years later, the Phoenix office combined with Mariscal, Weeks, McIntyre & Friedlander, P.A., adding more than 60 attorneys and becoming Dickinson Wright’s largest office outside Detroit.

Further U.S. expansion included new offices in Columbus and Saginaw (2012), Las Vegas, Lexington, and Reno (2015), Fort Lauderdale and Austin (2016), El Paso (2017), and Silicon Valley (2018). In 2021, the firm opened in Chicago through its combination with Stahl Cowen Crowley Addis LLC.

Most recently, the firm opened in Denver (2023), San Diego and Windsor (2024), and Seattle (2025). In addition to its North American offices, Dickinson Wright maintains affiliations with firms in China, Japan, South Korea, India, and Europe.

Long-Term Client Relationships and Recognition

Dickinson Wright has represented many of its major clients for decades. The firm has served Metropolitan Life Insurance Company since the late 1800s, Chrysler Corporation since its founding in the 1920s, and both Ford Motor Company and the National Bank of Detroit for more than 80 years.

== Practice areas ==
Key Practice Areas Include:

Corporate & Finance: Corporate law, Mergers & Acquisitions, Private Equity, Corporate Finance, Securities, Emerging Businesses

Intellectual Property & Technology: Intellectual Property, Patent Litigation, AI & Emerging Technologies, Cybersecurity & Data Privacy, Business Technology

Healthcare & Life Sciences: Healthcare, Life Sciences, Regulatory Compliance

Litigation & Dispute Resolution: Appellate, Products Liability, Automotive Litigation, Cross-Border (U.S.-Canada) Litigation, General Commercial Litigation

Labor & Employment: Employee Benefits, Labor & Employment

Real Estate & Construction: Real Estate, Construction, Energy, Sustainability & Environmental

Other Practice Areas: Administrative, Regulatory & Government Relations, Immigration, Native American Law, Taxation, Gaming, Media, Sports & Entertainment, Estate Planning.

== Offices ==
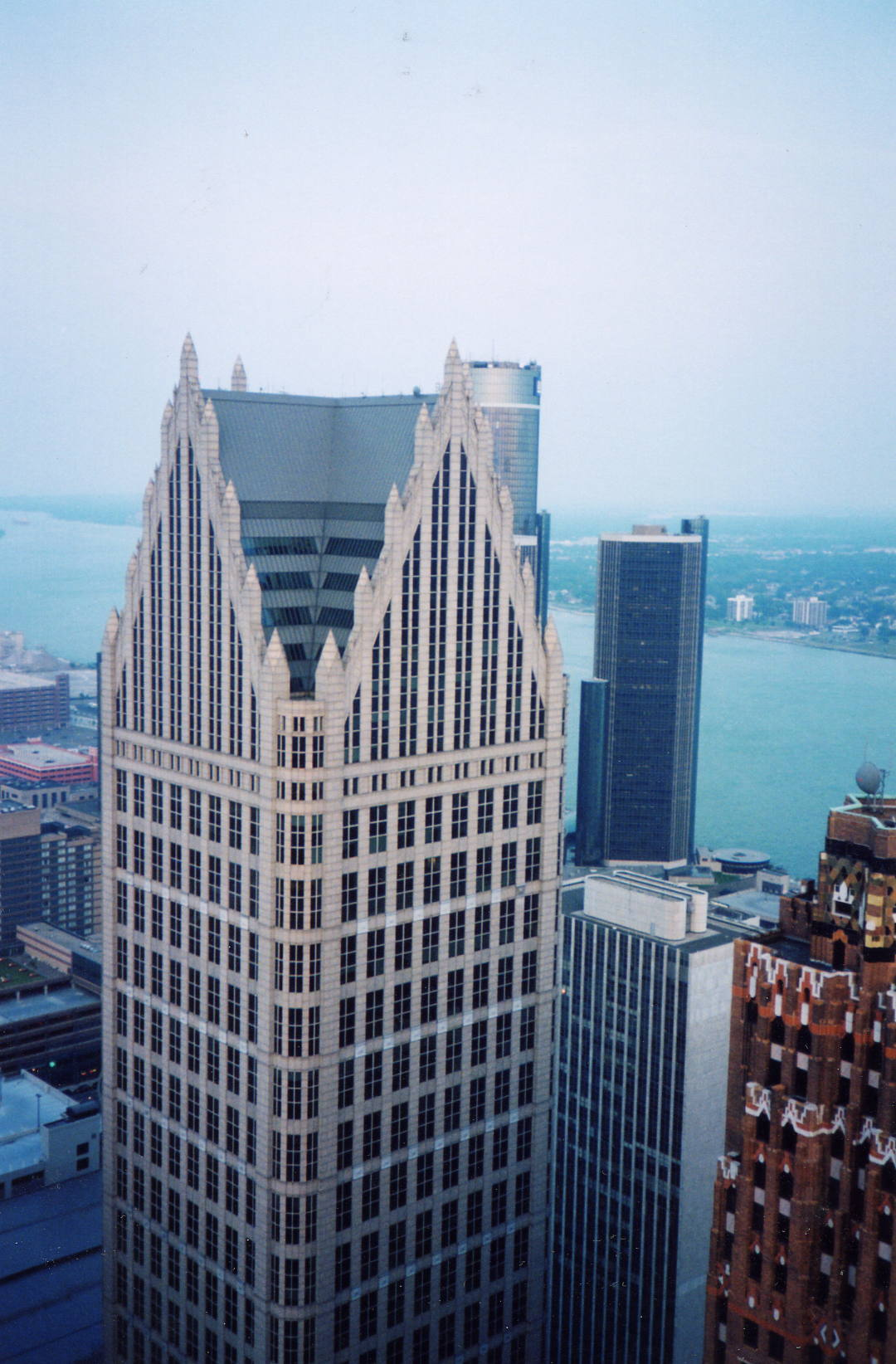
One Detroit Center, the location of Dickinson Wright's headquarters.

=== Current ===
- Detroit, Michigan (1878)
  - The firm's headquarters are in One Detroit Center in Downtown Detroit. The company moved into the building when it opened in 1992.
- Troy, Michigan (1966)
- Lansing, Michigan (1970)
- Washington, D.C. (1978)
- Grand Rapids, Michigan (1989)
- Ann Arbor, Michigan (2000)
- Toronto, Ontario (2008)
  - Expanded through a combination with Aylesworth LLP in 2011.
- Nashville, Tennessee (2009)
  - Opened through a combination with Stewart Estes & Donnell PLC.
- Phoenix, Arizona (2009)
  - Expanded through a combination with Mariscal, Weeks, McIntyre & Friedlander, P.A. in 2013.
- Las Vegas, Nevada (2010)
- Columbus, Ohio (2012)
- Saginaw, Michigan (2012)
- Lexington, Kentucky (2015)
- Reno, Nevada (2015)
- Ft. Lauderdale, Florida (2016)
- Austin, Texas (2016)
- El Paso, Texas (2017)
- Sunnyvale, California (2018)
- Chicago, Illinois (2021)
- Denver, Colorado (2023)
- Windsor, Ontario (2024
- San Diego, California (2024)
- Seattle, Washington (2025)

== Notable lawyers and alumni ==
- Kerry B. Harvey, former U. S. Attorney for the Eastern District of Kentucky, is a Member, Lexington office.
- Dennis Archer, former mayor of Detroit, current Chairman Emeritus, Detroit office.
- Vivian Bercovici, former Canadian ambassador to Israel.
- Mary Beth Kelly, former Justice on the Michigan Supreme Court.
- Susan Bieke Neilson, former judge on the United States Court of Appeals for the Sixth Circuit, former partner.
- John Corbett O'Meara, current federal judge of the United States District Court for the Eastern District of Michigan.
- Spencer Overton, professor at George Washington University Law School, scholar of election law.
- Henry Saad, current judge of the Michigan Court of Appeals, former partner.
- David Viviano, current Justice on the Michigan Supreme Court.
- Gretchen Whitmer, former Michigan State Senator (D-East Lansing), current Governor of Michigan.
- Brian K. Zahra, current Justice on the Michigan Supreme Court.

== Accolades ==
- Chambers: Dickinson Wright is recognized in Arizona, Kentucky, Michigan, Nevada, Ohio, Texas, and nationwide in the U.S., with 64 attorneys individually acknowledged. In Canada, the firm is noted for its Corporate/Commercial practice in Ontario, with four lawyers recognized for Corporate/Commercial, Franchising, and Real Estate. The Kentucky and Michigan Private Wealth practices are ranked in the Chambers High Net Worth Guide, with four lawyers individually listed.
- Best Lawyers – Best Law Firms®: In the annual Best Lawyers – Best Law Firms survey, Dickinson Wright received 205 First Tier rankings and 24 national rankings. The firm’s attorneys are also listed in Best Lawyers in America and Best Lawyers in Canada, with 17 named “Lawyers of the Year” for 2026 and 45 recognized as “Ones to Watch.”
- Legal 500: The firm’s Cannabis, Construction, Corporate/M&A, Dispute Resolution, Intellectual Property, Labor & Employment, and Real Estate practices are ranked, with one attorney listed as a Leading Lawyer and 73 recognized as Recommended Lawyers.
- Benchmark Litigation: Michigan and Arizona Litigation practices are consistently ranked, with eight attorneys individually listed.
- Super Lawyers: Over 100 attorneys are recognized across multiple U.S. regions, including Florida, Illinois, Michigan, Mid-South, Mountain State, Northern California, Ohio, Southwest, Texas, and Washington State.
- Midwest Real Estate News: The Real Estate practice is ranked #2 in the Best of the Best guide.
- IP Rankings: Michigan and Nevada Intellectual Property practices are ranked among the best in the U.S., with 16 attorneys listed as “IP Stars.” The Trademark practice is ranked in Arizona, Michigan, Nevada, Washington, D.C., and Canada, with 12 attorneys listed in WTR1000. Fourteen IP professionals are recognized by IAM Patent 1000 for patent work and leadership as expert witnesses.
- Corporate Equality Index (CEI): Dickinson Wright earned a perfect score of 100 on the Human Rights Campaign Foundation’s Corporate Equality Index for the seventh consecutive year.
