= Steven P. Croley =

American lawyer and executive

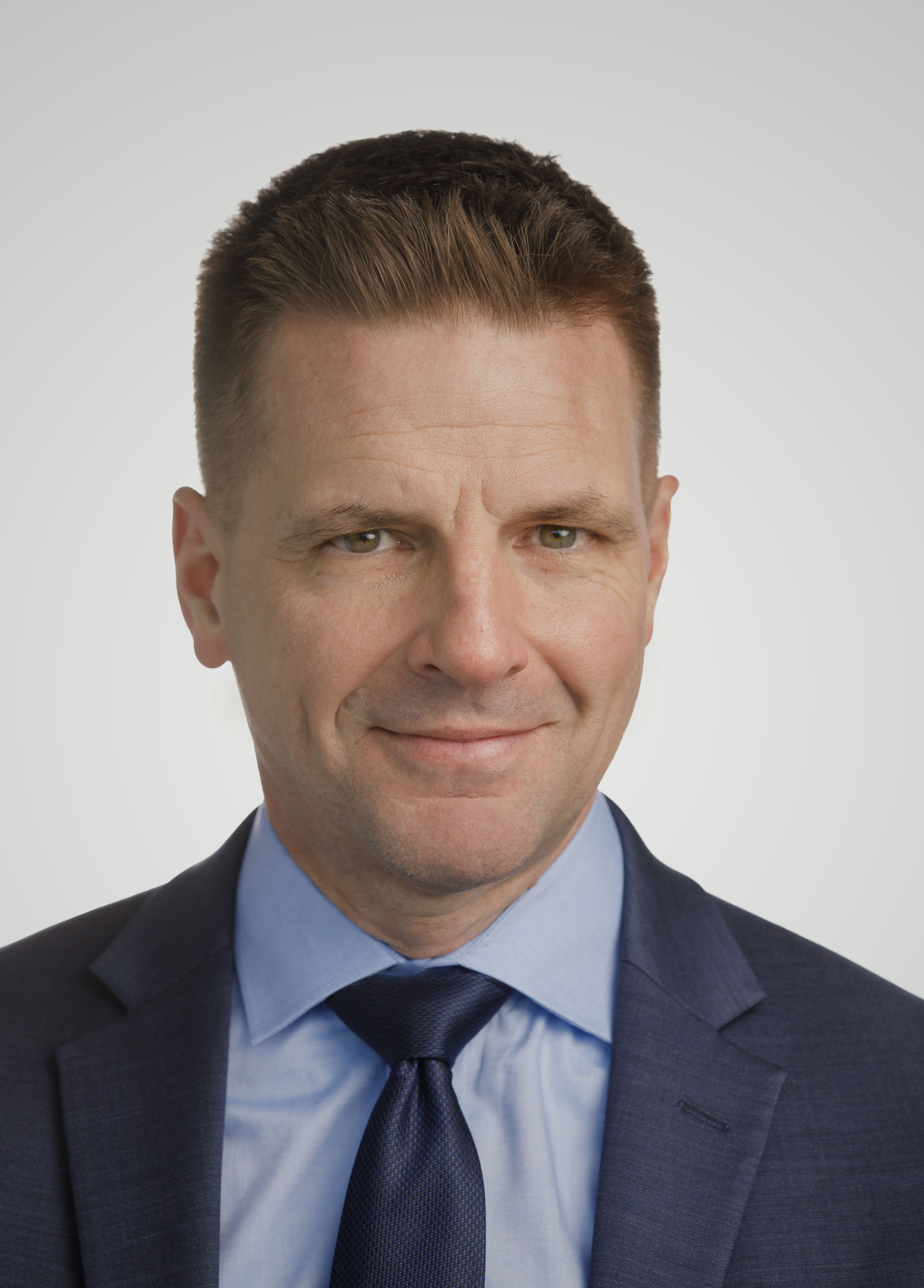

Steven Paul Croley, Chief Policy Officer and General Counsel of Ford Motor Company, is an American lawyer and executive.

He was sworn in following his Senate confirmation to become general counsel of the United States Department of Energy on May 21, 2014, and served in that role till January 19, 2017. At the Energy department, his responsibilities included all litigation, regulation, intellectual property, government contracts, crisis response, and legal policy.

Prior to joining the Department of Energy, he served in the Office of White House Counsel. From 2012 to 2014, he served as deputy assistant and deputy counsel to the president for legal policy, and from 2011 to 2012 as senior counsel to the president. In those capacities he provided advice and counseling to the President and senior White House staff. He oversaw a legal team handling a range of domestic legal issues. From 2010 to 2011, he served as special assistant to the president for justice & regulatory policy on the White House Domestic Policy Council. On the Domestic Policy Council, Croley had a "broad portfolio including good government and transparency issues, civil rights, food safety, and criminal justice policy."

Croley was also appointed by President Obama to serve as a council member of the Administrative Conference of the United States.

== Early life and education ==
Croley was born and raised in Central Michigan, where he attended public schools. He earned his A.B. summa cum laude and Phi Beta Kappa from the University of Michigan, where he was a James B. Angell Scholar and won the William Jennings Bryan Prize, in 1988. Croley then earned his J.D. from Yale Law School in 1991, where he was an articles editor of the Yale Law Journal, was a John M. Olin student fellow, and won the John M. Olin Prize and Benjamin Scharps Prize. Croley served as a law clerk for Judge Stephen F. Williams of the U.S. Court of Appeals for the District of Columbia Circuit from 1991 to 1992. Croley attended graduate school at Princeton University, where he was a University Fellow and earned an M.A. in 1994 and a Ph.D. in American politics in 1998.

== Professional history ==
Croley began his professional career as a professor of law at the University of Michigan. He joined the Michigan Law faculty in 1993, and was granted tenure in 1998. From 2003 to 2006, he served as the associate dean for academic affairs.

Croley was ranked by Brian Leiter in 2002 as being the ninth most widely cited law faculty who entered teaching since 1993. He is the author of Civil Justice Reconsidered: Towards a Less Costly, More Accessible Civil Litigation System (New York University Press, 2017), and of Regulation and Public Interests: The Possibility of Good Regulatory Government (Princeton University Press 2008), His work has appeared in numerous publications, including the Michigan Law Review, Harvard Law Review, Columbia Law Review, Administrative Law Journal, and the University of Chicago Law Review. At Michigan Law, Croley taught administrative law, torts, civil procedure, banking, energy law, and law and economics of regulated industries.

From 2006 to 2010, he served as a Special Assistant U.S. Attorney for the Eastern District of Michigan. He represented the United States in affirmative and defensive civil litigation in the federal trial and appellate courts.

Croley is admitted to the State Bar of Michigan the Illinois Bar, and the Washington DC Bar.

He has been a member of the American Bar Association, Federal Bar Association, American Constitution Society, and American Law and Economics Association. He has served on the board of the Institute for Policy Integrity and as a member of the Tobin Project on economic regulation. He has also served on the Executive Committee of the Michigan Institute of Continuing Legal Education and was its chair from 2004 to 2005. Croley has served as a peer reviewer for Regulation & Governance, the Journal of Politics; the Journal of Public Administration Research and Theory; and the Journal of Legal Studies. Croley also served as a research consultant to the U.S. Department of Labor from 1994 to 1995, to the Administrative Conference of the United States from 1994 to 1995, and the Michigan Law Revision Commission from 1996 to 1999.

== Personal life ==
Croley is married to American Arbitration Association President and CEO Bridget Mary McCormack, a former professor of law and associate dean of clinical affairs at the University of Michigan Law School and former Michigan Supreme Court Chief Justice. The couple has four children.
