= Judge Gilmore =

Judge Gilmore may refer to:

- Horace Weldon Gilmore (1918–2010), judge of the United States District Court for the Eastern District of Michigan
- Vanessa Gilmore (born 1956), judge of the United States District Court for the Southern District of Texas

== See also ==
- William J. Gilmore (1821–1896), justice of the Supreme Court of Ohio
- Helen W. Gillmor (born 1942), judge of the United States District Court for the District of Hawaii
