= Marilyn Jean Kelly =

American judge (born 1938)

Marilyn Kelly
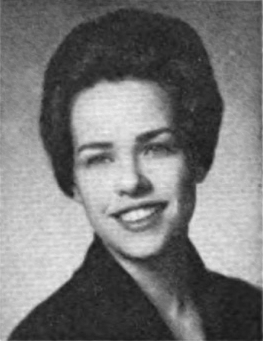

Chief Justice of the Michigan Supreme Court
- In office January 8, 2009 – January 1, 2011
- Preceded by: Clifford Taylor
- Succeeded by: Robert P. Young Jr.

Justice of the Michigan Supreme Court
- In office January 1, 1997 – January 1, 2013
- Preceded by: Charles Levin
- Succeeded by: Bridget Mary McCormack

Personal details
- Born: April 15, 1938 (age 88)
- Party: Democratic
- Education: Eastern Michigan University (BA); Middlebury College (MA); Wayne State University (JD)

Marilyn Jean Kelly (born April 15, 1938) is an American jurist. She was elected to two terms both on the Michigan Court of Appeals and as a justice of the Michigan Supreme Court. Due to her being over 70 years old, Kelly was prohibited by the Michigan Constitution to seek re-election in 2012.

Following Clifford Taylor's defeat in the 2008 elections, Justice Kelly was elected 4–3 to succeed him as Chief Justice of Michigan. She held that position until 2011 when Robert P. Young, Jr. was elected by the justices of the court.

== Biography ==
Kelly is a Detroit native and 1956 graduate of Mackenzie High School. In late 1956, Marilyn Jean Kelly moved to Ypsilanti to begin undergraduate coursework at Eastern Michigan University; she received her B.A. degree from E.M.U. in 1960. One year later, Kelly was awarded an M.A. degree in French Language and Literature from Middlebury College in Vermont. Following a brief stay in France, wrapping up her graduate studies at La Sorbonne - the University of Paris, Kelly spent five years teaching French in the Grosse Pointe public school system, Albion College and Eastern Michigan University.

== Career ==
Marilyn Jean Kelly also served on the Michigan State Board of Education during the 1960s; later elected as President of the statewide organization. In 1971, Marilyn Jean Kelly graduated with honors from the Wayne State University Law School. For the next seventeen years, Kelly clerked and practiced law as an associate attorney; eventually opening her own practice - Marilyn Kelly and Associates, of Bloomfield Hills.

In 1988, Kelly was elected to the first of two consecutive terms on the Michigan Court of Appeals. In 1996, during her second term on the appellate court, Marilyn Jean Kelly won election to the Michigan Supreme Court. Justice Kelly won a landslide re-election to the high court in 2004; receiving over 2 million votes - nearly half a million more than the runner-up.

Kelly has served as a member of the board of governors of Wayne State University since 2015.

Legal offices
Preceded by Charles Levin	Justice of the Michigan Supreme Court; 1997–2013	Succeeded by Bridget Mary McCormack
Preceded by Clifford Taylor	Chief Justice of the Michigan Supreme Court; 2009–2011	Succeeded by Robert P. Young Jr.
