= Stephen Markman =

American judge from Michigan (born 1949)

69th Chief Justice of the Michigan Supreme Court
- In office January 6, 2017 – January 9, 2019
- Preceded by: Robert P. Young Jr.
- Succeeded by: Bridget Mary McCormack

Associate Justice of the Michigan Supreme Court
- In office October 1, 1999 – January 1, 2021
- Appointed by: John Engler
- Preceded by: James H. Brickley
- Succeeded by: Elizabeth M. Welch

Personal details
- Born: June 4, 1949 (age 77) Detroit, Michigan, U.S.
- Party: Republican
- Spouse: Mary Kathleen
- Children: 2
- Education: Duke University (BA); University of Cincinnati (JD)

Stephen J. Markman (born June 4, 1949) is a former justice of the Michigan Supreme Court. He was appointed by Republican governor John Engler on October 1, 1999, to fill the vacancy created by the resignation of Justice James H. Brickley.

== Education ==
Markman received his Bachelor of Arts from Duke University in 1971, and he graduated from University of Cincinnati Law School in 1974.

== Career ==
Markman served as Chief Counsel of the United States Senate Subcommittee on the Constitution and as deputy chief counsel of the United States Senate Committee on the Judiciary from 1978 to 1985. He was then nominated to be a United States Assistant Attorney General, heading the Justice Department's Office of Legal Policy, by President Ronald Reagan and confirmed by the Senate. While serving as assistant attorney general, his office wrote a recommendation regarding the issue of possible reconsideration of the Miranda v. Arizona decision by the U.S. Supreme Court. When the Chicago Tribune criticized the recommendation, Markman responded with an opinion piece which the paper published entitled In Defense of Reconsidering Miranda; in this op-ed column, Markman argued for a more flexible interpretation of Miranda to bolster fair treatment of suspects in custody. He wrote:

The detailed report setting out my office's recommendations emphasized that changes in Miranda should be approached in the context of a general rethinking of policies concerning the questioning of suspects, which could include such reforms as videotaping or recording interrogations, imposing definite time limits on questioning, and prescribing specific rules concerning behavior and demeanor in questioning suspects. Measures like these would go far beyond the Miranda rules in ensuring fair treatment of suspects, but would predictably carry lesser costs to the public`s interest in effective police investigation. Conversely, no real progress can be expected in promoting either of these objectives in the context of custodial questioning so long as the myth persists that the specific procedures suggested in the Miranda decision must be regarded, for unexplained reasons, as sacrosanct and immutable.

After being nominated by George H. W. Bush and approved by the United States Senate, Markman served as a United States Attorney in Michigan from 1989 to 1993. He joined the private sector firm of Miller, Canfield, Paddock & Stone in Detroit, where he practiced until he was appointed to the 4th District Michigan Court of Appeals by Governor John Engler in 1995. He held that position until 1999, when Governor Engler appointed him to the Michigan Supreme Court. Michigan voters elected him to the position in 2000.

Since 1993, Markman has taught constitutional law at Hillsdale College, where he holds the title of distinguished visiting professor of Politics.

Markman has contributed to numerous legal publications and was a contributing editor at National Review. He is a Fellow of the Michigan Bar Foundation, a Master of the Bench of the Inns of Court. Markman was sent to Ukraine by the State Department to assist in developing the country's post-Soviet constitution.

Markman was re-elected as Supreme Court judge in 2004 and 2012.

Markman served as chief justice in 2017 and 2018. He did not seek another two years in 2019, and was replaced by Bridget Mary McCormack. Markman's term on the Supreme Court was up for re-election in 2020. However, Markman was ineligible to run due to Michigan's Constitution prohibiting judges that are 70 or older running for office. Markman was 71 in November 2020.

== Judicial philosophy ==
Markman has argued against an increased role by the judiciary in matters of public policy and suggested that unless citizens engage in a constitutional debate, public matters will be increasingly decided by judges. In 2008, Markman wrote a piece for the Harvard Journal of Law and Public Policy saying, "[T]he Michigan Supreme Court has set as its priority the proper exercise of the 'judicial power,' to read the law evenhandedly and give it meaning by assessing its words, its grammar and syntax, its context, and its legislative purpose. The court's dominant premise has been on 'getting the law right'—moving toward the best and most faithful interpretation of the law—rather than reflexively acquiescing in prior case law that essentially reflected little more than the personal preferences of predecessor justices."

In April 2010, Markman published an essay in Hillsdale College's monthly publication, Imprimis, in which he argued against a living constitution with expanded input from judicial governance. Markman prefers an interpretation closer to the 1787 Constitution, and predicts that unless citizens act, justices making under-the-radar decisions on "forgettable and mundane disputes" (as opposed to high–profile decisions such as Roe v. Wade) will steer public policy in directions of their choosing in such areas as "racial quotas, social services funding, and immigration policy." Markman prefers that public policy decisions be made by legislators instead of judges.

== Notable Supreme Court decisions ==
=== Domestic partner benefits ===
In Pride at Work v. Governor of Michigan, the Michigan Supreme Court, in a 5–2 ruling, ruled that Michigan's 2004 gay marriage ban also bars same-sex domestic partners of public employees from receiving health insurance benefits. Markman wrote the majority opinion for the court where he said that while "marriages and domestic partnerships aren't identical, they are similar."

=== Ballot petition signatures ===
In Michigan Civil Rights Initiative v. Board of State Canvassers, the Michigan Supreme Court ruled that the Michigan Civil Rights Initiative should be placed on the November 2008 ballot, even if some petition signers signed the petition under the belief that it was in support of affirmative action. In his opinion, Markman wrote, "The signers of these petitions did not sign the oral representations made to them by circulators; rather they signed written petitions that contained the actual language of the MCRI. ... In carrying out the responsibilities of self-government, 'we the people' of Michigan are responsible for our own actions. In particular, when the citizen acts in what is essentially a legislative capacity by facilitating the enactment of a constitutional amendment, he cannot blame others when he signs a petition without knowing what it says. It is not to excuse misrepresentations, when they occur, to recognize nonetheless that it is the citizen's duty to inform himself about the substance of a petition before signing it, precisely in order to combat potential misrepresentations."

=== Emergency powers of the Michigan executive ===
In re Certified Questions (Midwest Institute Of Health, PLLC v Governor), contrary to his prior advocacy of judicial restraint, Markman ruled for a fragmented court that Michigan's Emergency Management Act of 1976 (EMA) and the Emergency Powers of the Governor Act of 1945 (EPGA) were an "unlawful delegation of legislative power to the executive branch in violation of the Michigan Constitution." The decision was "handed down by a narrow majority of Republican justices." Michigan became an outlier. At this time, every state and the Federal government had declared an emergency due to the CoViD-19 pandemic.

Michigan's lower courts had previously ruled against the Republican-controlled legislature. This decision was an advisory opinion via a Federal lawsuit by outpatient medical providers over an order by Democratic governor Gretchen Whitmer that barred nonessential medical procedures during the pandemic.

== Ukraine ==
Following the fall of the Soviet Union in 1991, Markman was invited to the newly-independent nation of Ukraine on behalf of the U.S. State Department as a member of an American delegation consulting with Ukrainian lawmakers in the establishment of the nation’s new post-Soviet constitution, a Constitution of Ukraine that was eventually completed and ratified in 1996. Later in 2021, he was chosen by Ukraine, the European Union and USAid to serve as one of three “international judicial experts” on the newly-established Selection Commission of Ukraine whose responsibility it was, along with three Ukrainian appellate judges, including a member of its Supreme Court, to select 16 members of the country’s then-dormant High Qualification Commission of Judges who would evaluate, select and retain Ukrainian judges. The European Union had made clear that while it was willing to admit Ukraine to its membership, it was contingent upon a Ukrainian judiciary of the highest European standards. Markman served in this position for a designated four-year term until 2025. During this time, the Selection Commission evaluated the applications of more than 400 Ukrainian jurists, attorneys, and legal academicians for elevation to the HQCJ. The work of the Commission was subject to considerable delays on account of the Russian invasion of Ukraine in February of 2022.

== Miscellaneous ==
Markman taught constitutional law from 1983-2022 at Hillsdale College, where he held the title of distinguished visiting professor of Politics contributing twice to the College’s ‘Imprimis’ publication. Markman became the first President of the District of Columbia Lawyer’s Division of the Federalist Society, presiding over monthly presentations of such Reagan-era speakers as Attorney General Edwin Meese, U.S. Court of Appeals Judges and Supreme Court nominees Robert Bork and Douglas Ginsburg, U.S. Solicitor General Rex Lee, U.S. Representatives Henry Hyde and Jack Kemp, U.S. Secretary of Education William Bennett, and U.S. Senator Orrin Hatch. He has also contributed to numerous legal publications and was a contributing editor at the National Review magazine, authoring articles on such issues as Supreme Court nominee Ruth Ginsburg, the constitutional legacy of Justice William Brennan, the roots of affirmative action, and capital punishment. In 1992, he represented National Review, alongside Professor Hadley Arkes of Amherst College, in a debate on capital punishment, aligned against the Reverend Jesse Jackson and journalist Christopher Hitchens, who represented The Nation magazine, in an event moderated by New York City Mayor Ed Koch. He has joined Michigan probate judges in presiding with them over more than one hundred adoptions.

== Personal life ==
Markman lives in Mason, Michigan with his wife, Mary Kathleen. He has two sons, James and Charles, and eight grandchildren.

== See also ==
List of justices of the Michigan Supreme Court

Legal offices
Preceded by James H. Brickley	Justice of the Michigan Supreme Court; 1999–2020	Succeeded by Elizabeth M. Welch
Preceded by Robert P. Young Jr.	Chief Justice of the Michigan Supreme Court; 2017–2019	Succeeded by Bridget Mary McCormack
