= Andrew Fink =

American politician

Member of the Michigan House of Representatives
- In office January 1, 2021 – December 31, 2024
- Preceded by: Eric Leutheuser
- Succeeded by: Jennifer Wortz
- Constituency: 58th district (2021–2022); 35th district (2023–2024)

Personal details
- Born: Andrew Frederick Fink; July 30, 1985 (age 40) Ypsilanti, Michigan, U.S.
- Education: Hillsdale College (BA); University of Michigan (JD)

Andrew Frederick Fink (born July 30, 1985) is an American politician previously serving as a member of the Michigan House of Representatives from 2021 to 2025, representing the 35th district. A member of the Republican Party, Fink was a candidate in the 2024 Michigan Supreme Court election.

== Early life, education, and legal career ==
Fink was born on July 30, 1985, in Superior Township, Washtenaw County, Michigan. He received a bachelor's degree in politics from Hillsdale College and a J.D. from the University of Michigan Law School. He was a member of the United States Marine Corps Judge Advocate Division from 2011 to 2014.

In 2017, he moved from Ypsilanti to Hillsdale, where he ran a satellite office of his family's law firm, Fink and Fink, PLLC. He was district director for Mike Shirkey, a Republican member of the Michigan State Senate and the Senate Majority Leader, from January 2019 to January 2020. Fink is a member of the Federalist Society, the American Legion, and was a commissioner-at-large for the State Bar of Michigan.

== Political career ==
In the 2020 Republican primary for the Michigan House of Representatives, District 58, Fink ran against farmer Andy Welden, attorney Daren Wiseley, and Hillsdale Mayor Adam Stockford. The district covers Hillsdale County and Branch; incumbent Eric Leutheuser could not run for reelection due to term limits. Of the 16,881 total votes in the August 2020 Republican primary, Fink received 6,520 votes (38.62%), Welden 4,310 votes (25.53%); Wiseley 3,126 votes (18.52%), and Stockford 2,925 votes (17.33%).

During his 2020 campaign, Fink took the position that Michigan Governor Gretchen Whitmer's actions in response to the COVID-19 pandemic in Michigan were unconstitutional. His primary campaign was supported by Citizens for Energizing Michigan's Economy (CEME), a 501(c)(4) "dark money" group related to Consumers Energy, which ran several mailers and ads in favor of Fink.

In the general election, Fink faced Democratic nominee Tamara Barnes of Coldwater, a director of the Kalamazoo Valley Museum. Fink won 71.22% of the vote (30,208 votes) and Barnes 28.78% of the vote (12,208 votes).

Upon taking office, Fink was assigned to the House Appropriations, Military and Veterans Affairs and State Police; and Health Policy committees.

After redistricting, in 2022, Fink was elected to the 35th district.

Fink retired from the state House in 2024, choosing instead to run for the Michigan Supreme Court. He was succeeded in the state House by Jennifer Wortz. He lost the Supreme Court election to Kimberly Thomas.

== Personal life ==
Fink lives in Adams Township. He is married to Lauren Grover and has five children.
