= 1990 Michigan Attorney General election =

- November 6, 1990
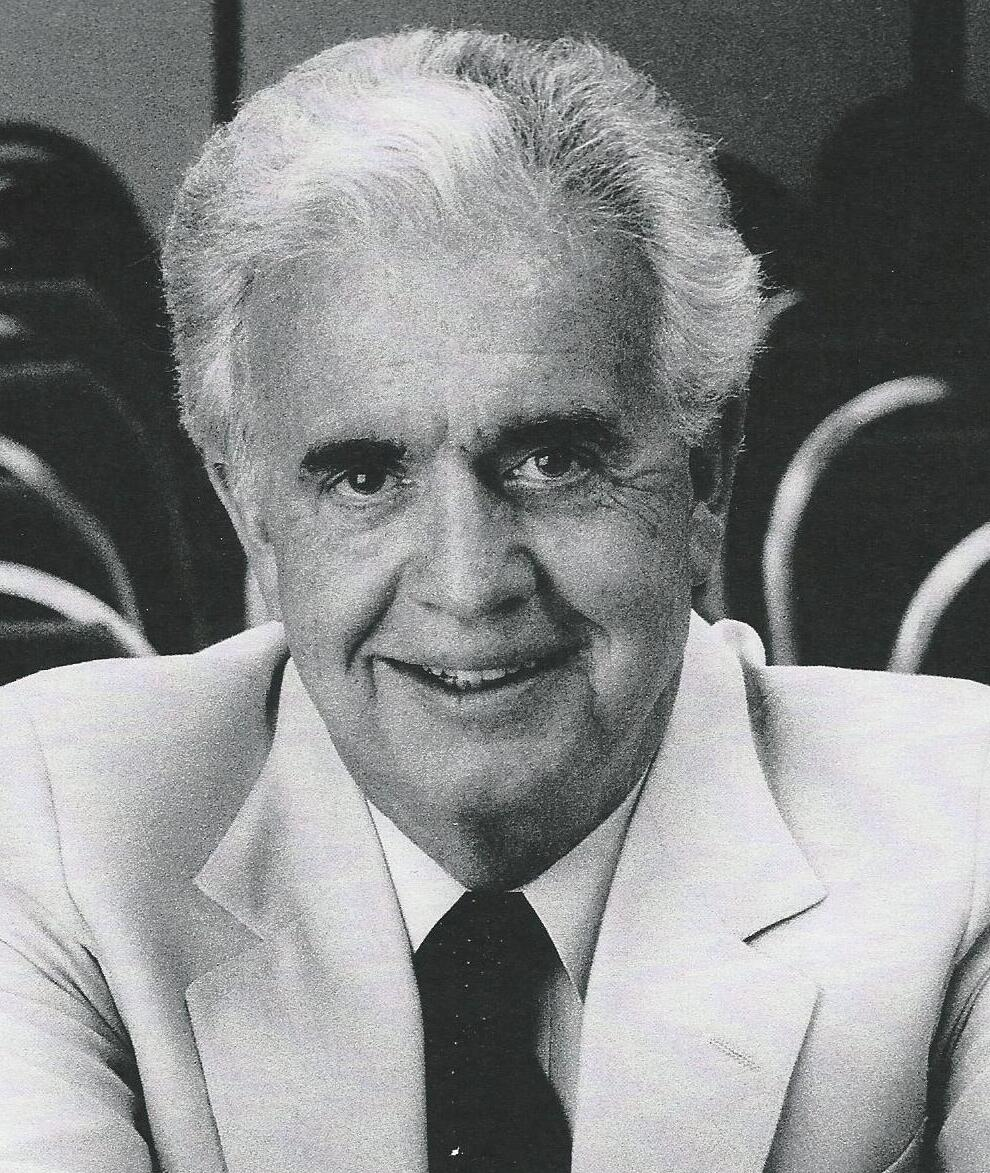

Nominee	Frank J. Kelley	Clifford W. Taylor
Party	Democratic	Republican
Popular vote	1,565,686	890,925
Percentage	63.73%	36.27%
- County results Kelley: 50–60% 60–70% 70–80% Taylor: 50–60% 60–70%
Attorney General before election
Frank J. Kelley
Democratic
Elected Attorney General
Frank J. Kelley
Democratic

The 1990 Michigan Attorney General election was held on November 6, 1990. Incumbent Democrat Frank J. Kelley defeated Republican nominee Clifford W. Taylor with 63.73% of the vote.

== General election ==
=== Candidates ===
Major party candidates

- Frank J. Kelley, Democratic
- Clifford W. Taylor, Republican

=== Results ===
Michigan Attorney General election, 1990
Party	Candidate	Votes	%
Democratic	Frank J. Kelley (incumbent)	1,565,686	63.73
Republican	Clifford W. Taylor	890,925	36.27
Write-ins		94	0.00
Total votes		2,456,705	100
Democratic hold			
