= Mark A. Goldsmith =

American judge (born 1952)

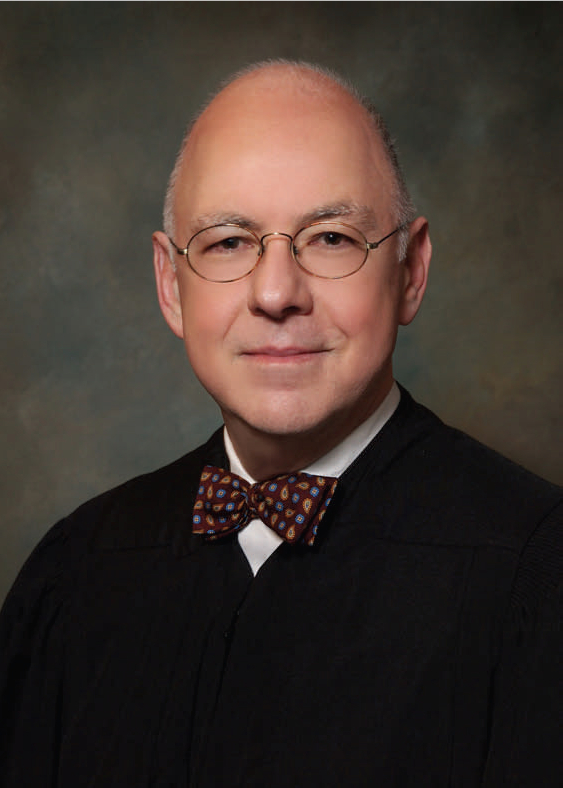

Judge of the United States District Court for the Eastern District of Michigan
- Incumbent
- Assumed office June 22, 2010
- Appointed by: Barack Obama
- Preceded by: John Corbett O'Meara

Personal details
- Born: August 1952 (age 73) Detroit, Michigan, U.S.
- Education: University of Michigan (BA); Harvard University (JD)

Mark Allan Goldsmith (born August 1952) is a United States district judge of the United States District Court for the Eastern District of Michigan.

== Early life and education ==
Born in Detroit to a Jewish family, Goldsmith was a member of the first graduating class of Hillel Day School. He earned a Bachelor of Arts degree in 1974 from the University of Michigan and a Juris Doctor in 1977 from Harvard Law School.

== Career ==
From 1979 until 1980, Goldsmith served as a litigation associate for the law firm Paul, Weiss, Rifkind, Wharton & Garrison in New York City. From 1980 until 1987, Goldsmith served as a sole legal practitioner in Birmingham, Michigan. From 1987 until 1988, he served as an associate for the Detroit law firm Honigman Miller Schwartz and Cohn, and then from 1988 until 2004, Goldsmith served as a partner for the same firm. In 2004, Goldsmith became a circuit court judge in Oakland County, Michigan.

=== Federal judicial service ===
In March 2009, Goldsmith submitted an application to Michigan's judicial advisory committee, which was established by Michigan Senators Carl Levin and Debbie Stabenow. He was interviewed by the committee in May 2009. In June 2009, the committee informed Goldsmith that it intended to recommend his nomination to President Obama for nomination to the federal district court. On February 4, 2010, Obama officially nominated Goldsmith for the seat, which would fill the vacancy created by the decision by Judge John Corbett O'Meara to assume senior status. On March 18, 2010, the United States Senate Committee on the Judiciary reported Goldsmith's nomination to the full Senate. The Senate confirmed Goldsmith on June 21, 2010 by an 89–0 vote. He received his commission on June 22, 2010.

== See also ==
- List of Jewish American jurists

Legal offices
Preceded by John Corbett O'Meara	Judge of the United States District Court for the Eastern District of Michigan; 2010–present	Incumbent
