= John Corbett O'Meara =

American judge (1933–2024)

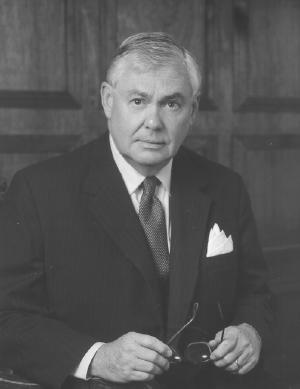

Senior Judge of the United States District Court for the Eastern District of Michigan
- In office January 1, 2007 – October 5, 2024

Judge of the United States District Court for the Eastern District of Michigan
- In office September 15, 1994 – January 1, 2007
- Appointed by: Bill Clinton
- Preceded by: Horace Weldon Gilmore
- Succeeded by: Mark A. Goldsmith

Personal details
- Born: November 4, 1933 Hillsdale, Michigan, U.S.
- Died: October 5, 2024 (aged 90) Ann Arbor, Michigan, U.S.
- Party: Democratic
- Parent(s): Karolyn Corbett O'Meara and John Richard O'Meara
- Education: University of Notre Dame (AB); Harvard University (LLB)

John Corbett O'Meara (November 4, 1933 – October 5, 2024) was a United States district judge of the United States District Court for the Eastern District of Michigan.

== Early life and career ==
O'Meara was born in Hillsdale, Michigan, on November 4, 1933. He received his secondary education in the Hillsdale Public Schools and received an Artium Baccalaureus degree from the University of Notre Dame in 1955. Between college and law school, he served on active duty with the United States Navy as a line officer in submarines and was engineer officer of the navy's first guided missile submarine, from 1955 to 1959. After leaving the navy, he served in Washington, D.C. as staff assistant to United States Senator Philip A. Hart.

O'Meara received a Bachelor of Laws from Harvard Law School in 1962. O'Meara joined the Harvard College faculty while pursuing a law degree and worked as a member of the Freshman Dean's staff as well as the coach of the Harvard Freshman Debate Team. He was in private practice in Detroit, Michigan from 1962 to 1994, specializing in employment law litigation, representing management clients. He became a partner in the firm of Dickinson, Wright, Moon, VanDusen and Freeman of Detroit, Michigan. He was the first Group Head of the Employment Law Group at Dickinson, Wright.

O'Meara also taught employment law as an adjunct professor at the University of Detroit Law School from 1965 through 1970. He attained the rank of Commander in the Naval Reserve and was the Commanding Officer of Submarine Reserve Division 9-228 located at the Brodhead Naval Armory in Detroit.

Before his appointment to the bench, O'Meara was politically active in connection with a variety of candidates and causes and held various positions in the Democratic Party and for its candidates, as well as for Judicial candidates. He also served as an officer or member of various sections and committees of the American Bar Association, the State Bar of Michigan, and the Detroit Bar Association.

=== Federal judicial service ===
On April 26, 1994, O'Meara was nominated by President Bill Clinton to a seat on the United States District Court for the Eastern District of Michigan vacated by Horace Weldon Gilmore. O'Meara was confirmed by the United States Senate on September 14, 1994, and received his commission on September 15, 1994. He assumed senior status on January 1, 2007.

== Personal life and death ==
In 2013, his son, Corbett O'Meara, died in a car crash.

John Corbett O'Meara died in Ann Arbor, Michigan, on October 5, 2024, at the age of 90.

Legal offices
Preceded by Horace Weldon Gilmore	Judge of the United States District Court for the Eastern District of Michigan; 1994–2007	Succeeded by Mark A. Goldsmith
