= Michigan Hall of Justice =

Supreme court building in Michigan, United States

Coordinates: 42.73377°N 84.56576°W

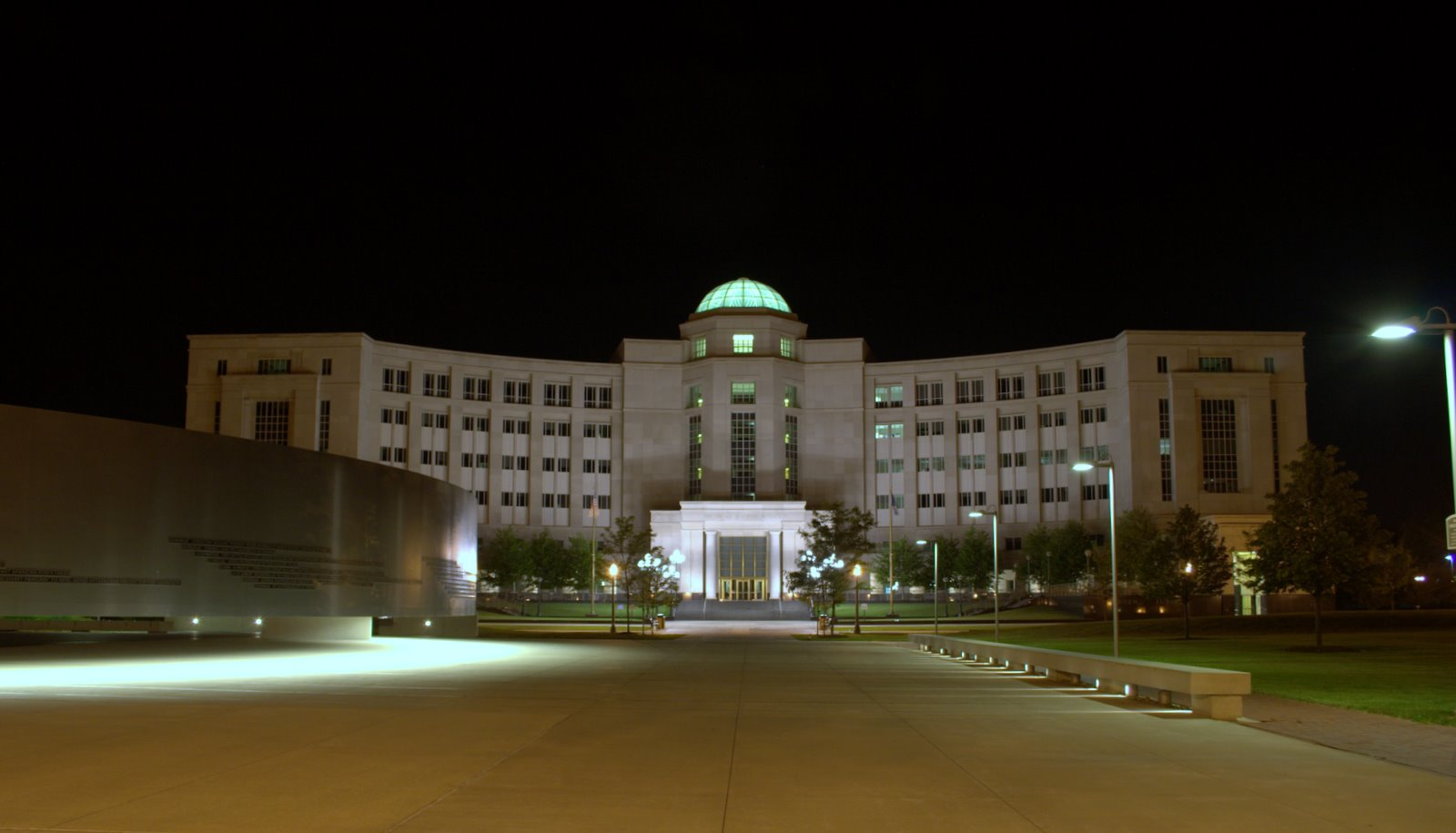
Frontal view of the Michigan Hall of Justice.

The Michigan Hall of Justice, also known as the Michigan Supreme Court Building, is a six-story structure at 925 Ottawa Street in Lansing, Michigan. An example of monumental neoclassicism, the Hall of Justice was designed by Spillis Candella DMJM and Albert Kahn Associates, Inc.

The building contains a total of 280,000 sq ft (26,000 m^{2}) houses the Michigan Supreme Court, state court administrative offices and a 3,800 sq ft (350 m^{2}) learning center. The Michigan Hall of Justice is situated at the west end of the mall facing the Michigan State Capitol and consists of a limestone-clad central entry, framed by Doric columns, and two curved wings. Above the entry is a three-sided bay that is capped by a glass dome. One-story colonnades extend from the two curved wings providing a covered area for pedestrians and helping to link the building visually to the Capitol.

== History ==
When the Michigan State Capitol opened in 1879, it included an elaborately decorated chamber for The Supreme Court on the third floor. Court members and their staff originally occupied the rooms adjacent to the chamber in the east corridor. These facilities were quickly taxed beyond their capacity as the court had only four justices when it moved into these quarters and a fifth justice was added in 1887, increasing to eight in 1903.

In 1922, several state offices moved from the Capitol Building into the newly constructed Lewis Cass Building and the Supreme Court expanded into space previously occupied by the State Library. The number of justices was reduced to seven by the Michigan Constitution of 1963. The court continued to use these cramped facilities until 1970.

When the Lewis Cass Building opened, many in the Michigan Government recognized the need for expanded facilities to house the Supreme Court. In his master plan for Lansing created 1920-1921, urban planner Harland Bartholomew included a stately court building at the west end of the capitol but the Legislature took no steps to fulfill this portion of the plan.

The Supreme Court left the Capitol Building for temporary quarters in the Law Building, later renamed for Governor and Supreme Court member G. Mennen Williams, on the capitol mall in 1970. It remained there for 32 years until moving to the Hall of Justice.

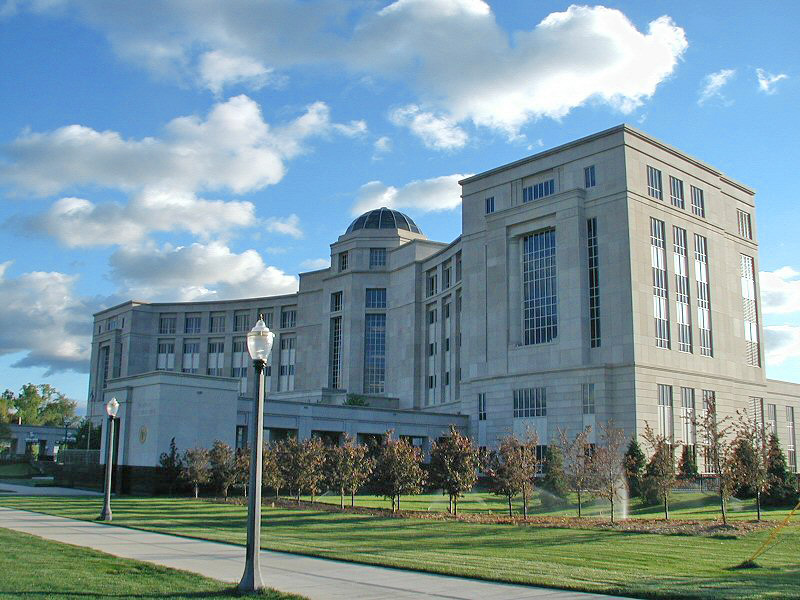
Michigan Hall of Justice from the north

The groundbreaking for the Hall of Justice was October 12, 1999 and it was dedicated October 8, 2002. The lobby of the court chamber is on the sixth floor under the 16 ft (4.9 m) diameter glass dome. The chamber is to the rear of the building. The furnishings and design of the chamber are based on those in the 1871 chamber in the Capitol Building. The carpet design and colors are also based on those used in the original chamber. The ceiling is a low, coffered dome with clerestory windows around its perimeter. The judicial bench and spectator seating are a dark mahogany.
