= Elizabeth M. Welch =

American judge (born 1970)

Elizabeth Welch

Associate Justice of the Michigan Supreme Court
- Incumbent
- Assumed office January 1, 2021
- Preceded by: Stephen Markman

Personal details
- Born: September 20, 1970 (age 55) Grand Rapids, Michigan, U.S.
- Party: Democratic
- Spouse: Brian
- Children: 4
- Education: Pennsylvania State University (BA); Ohio State University (JD)

Elizabeth Merrill Welch (born September 20, 1970) is an American lawyer from Michigan who has served as an associate justice of the Michigan Supreme Court since 2021.

== Education ==
Welch received her Bachelor of Arts from Pennsylvania State University and her Juris Doctor from the Ohio State University Moritz College of Law.

== Career ==
Welch has been practicing law in Michigan and Ohio since 1995, she later opened up her own practice in Grand Rapids in 2004.

=== Michigan Supreme Court ===
Welch was nominated as a candidate for the Michigan Supreme Court by the Michigan Democratic Party. Welch ran for the seat being vacated by Justice Stephen Markman whose term was expiring. On November 3, 2020, Welch went on to win the general election, giving the Michigan Supreme Court a Democratic majority.

== Personal life ==
Welch lives in Grand Rapids with her husband, Brian; they have 4 children.

Legal offices
| Preceded by Stephen Markman | Associate Justice of the Michigan Supreme Court; 2021–present | Incumbent |
