= Kimberly Thomas =

American judge (born 1971 or 1972)

Associate Justice of the Michigan Supreme Court
- Incumbent
- Assumed office January 1, 2025
- Preceded by: David Viviano

Personal details
- Born: 1971 or 1972 (age 53–54)
- Party: Democratic
- Education: University of Maryland, College Park (BS); Harvard University (JD)

Kimberly Ann Thomas (born 1971 or 1972) is an American academic and judge. She has served as a justice of the Michigan Supreme Court since 2025.

== Education ==
Thomas received a Bachelor of Science degree, magna cum laude from the University of Maryland and a Juris Doctor magna cum laude from Harvard Law School.

== Career ==
Before joining law school, Thomas was a reporter for The Detroit News. After law school, Thomas clerked for Judge R. Guy Cole of the United States Court of Appeals for the Sixth Circuit. Thomas joined the University of Michigan School of Law in 2003, prior to that she was a trial attorney with Defender Association of Philadelphia. She was awarded a Fulbright scholarship which lead her to teach at the University College Cork School of Law in Cork, Ireland.

=== Michigan Supreme Court ===
In April 2024, Thomas announced her candidacy for a seat on the Michigan Supreme Court. Thomas received the endorsement of Chief Justice Elizabeth T. Clement. Thomas won election the Supreme Court, defeating challenger Andrew Fink.

== Personal life ==
She lives in Washtenaw County with her husband and two children.

== Electoral history ==
2024 Michigan Supreme Court election (Full term)
Party	Candidate	Votes	%
Nonpartisan	Kimberly Thomas	2,568,043	61.11%
Nonpartisan	Andrew Fink	1,634,510	38.89%
Total votes		4,202,553	100.0%
Democratic gain from Republican			

Legal offices
Preceded by David Viviano	Associate Justice of the Michigan Supreme Court; 2025–present	Incumbent
