= Bridget Mary McCormack =

American judge (born 1966)

Bridget McCormack
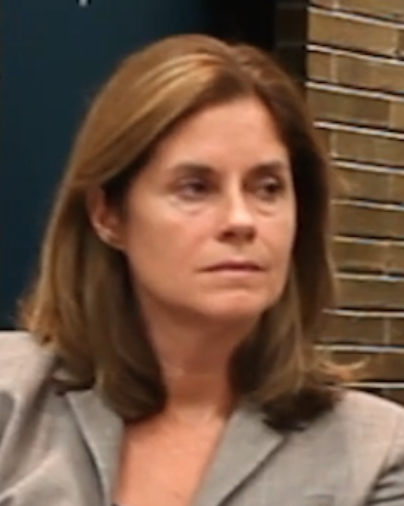
- McCormack in 2012

70th Chief Justice of the Michigan Supreme Court
- In office January 9, 2019 – November 22, 2022
- Preceded by: Stephen Markman
- Succeeded by: Elizabeth T. Clement

Associate Justice of the Michigan Supreme Court
- In office January 1, 2013 – December 31, 2022
- Preceded by: Marilyn Jean Kelly
- Succeeded by: Kyra Harris Bolden

Personal details
- Born: July 23, 1966 (age 59) Plainfield, New Jersey, U.S.
- Party: Democratic
- Spouse: Steven P. Croley
- Children: 4
- Relatives: Mary McCormack (sister); Will McCormack (brother)
- Education: Trinity College, Connecticut (BA); New York University (JD)

Bridget Mary McCormack (born July 23, 1966) is an American lawyer, professor, and retired justice. She served on the Michigan Supreme Court from 2013 to 2022, first as an associate justice, and as chief justice from 2019 to 2022. Previously she was a professor at the University of Michigan Law School in Ann Arbor, where she taught criminal law and legal ethics and oversaw the law school's clinical programs as associate dean of clinical affairs. Her academic work focused on practical experience in legal education. McCormack launched and worked in a pediatric advocacy law clinic focusing on children with health problems, and a domestic violence clinic. She retired from the Supreme Court at the end of 2022 and became President and Chief Executive Officer of the American Arbitration Association in February 2023.

== Education ==
The older sister of actress Mary and filmmaker Will, McCormack grew up in Plainfield, New Jersey and graduated from Wardlaw-Hartridge School in 1984. She received her Bachelor of Arts with honors in political science and philosophy from Trinity College in Connecticut in 1988. She received her Juris Doctor from New York University School of Law, where she was a Root-Tilden Scholar, in 1991.

== Career ==
McCormack started her legal career in New York, first as trial counsel at the Legal Aid Society and then at the Office of the Appellate Defender. She taught at Yale Law School in New Haven, Connecticut as a Robert M. Cover Fellow from 1997 to 1998.

She joined the faculty of the University of Michigan Law School in 1998, and became associate dean of clinical affairs in 2003. As associate dean for clinical affairs at the law school, McCormack supervised students in complex federal litigation in the general clinical program. McCormack also worked to expand Michigan Law School's clinical offerings during her tenure.

In 2008, McCormack founded the Michigan Innocence Clinic, which is the nation's first innocence clinic to focus on non-DNA evidence.

McCormack has published articles on constitutional law, criminal law, criminal procedure, evidence, and legal ethics. McCormack served on the Association of American Law Schools Committee on Academic Freedom and Tenure. In 2008, she testified before the Detroit City Council about its investigation of the city attorney's role in the case involving former Detroit Mayor Kwame Kilpatrick.

== Michigan Supreme Court ==
=== 2012 election ===
In 2012, McCormack ran for a seat on the Michigan Supreme Court. She ran an independent outsider campaign, and was not a favorite of the Michigan Democratic Party establishment, though she ultimately received the party's endorsement.

Her campaign included an advertisement encouraging voters to complete the non-partisan section of the ballot where this seat was listed, and also promoting her qualifications. The ad featured a reunion of much of the principal cast of The West Wing in their former roles, including McCormack's sister Mary.

During the campaign, the Judicial Crisis Network released an ad claiming that McCormack had "volunteered to help free a terrorist" when she represented Abdumuqit Vohidov, who had been held without charge in Guantanamo. Andrew Rosenthal of The New York Times criticized the ad as exploitative, pointing out that Vohidov was released by a non-judicial board, and questioning whether he should be described as a "terrorist".

McCormack was elected, along with incumbents Stephen Markman and Brian Zahra.

=== Chief Justice ===
In 2019, Markman stepped down as chief justice, and the members of the court chose McCormack to succeed him. This was the first time in the state's history that the governor (Gretchen Whitmer), attorney general (Dana Nessel), secretary of state (Jocelyn Benson), and chief justice (McCormack) were all women.

In 2020, McCormack was reelected to a second eight-year term on the Supreme Court. In September 2022, she announced that she would retire by the end of the year to take over as president and CEO of the American Arbitration Association.

== Personal life ==
McCormack's father is a former United States Marine and retired small business owner, and her mother is a clinical social worker. McCormack's sister Mary is an actress. Her brother Will is an actor and screenwriter.

McCormack is married to University of Michigan Law School professor Steven P. Croley, who served as general counsel in the United States Department of Energy from 2014 to 2017, while on leave from the law school. The couple have four children.

Legal offices
Preceded by Marilyn Jean Kelly	Associate Justice of the Michigan Supreme Court; 2013–2022	Succeeded by Kyra Harris Bolden
Preceded by Stephen Markman	Chief Justice of the Michigan Supreme Court; 2019–2022	Succeeded by Elizabeth T. Clement
