= Horace Weldon Gilmore =

American judge (1918–2010)

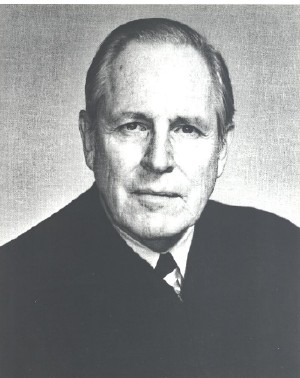

Senior Judge of the United States District Court for the Eastern District of Michigan
- In office May 1, 1991 – January 25, 2010

Judge of the United States District Court for the Eastern District of Michigan
- In office June 18, 1980 – May 1, 1991
- Appointed by: Jimmy Carter
- Preceded by: Cornelia Groefsema Kennedy
- Succeeded by: John Corbett O'Meara

Personal details
- Born: Horace Weldon Gilmore; April 4, 1918 Columbus, Ohio
- Died: January 25, 2010 (aged 91) Grosse Pointe, Michigan
- Education: University of Michigan (BA); University of Michigan Law School (JD)

Horace Weldon Gilmore (April 4, 1918 – January 25, 2010) was a United States district judge of the United States District Court for the Eastern District of Michigan.

== Education and career ==
Born in Columbus, Ohio, Gilmore received a Bachelor of Arts degree from the University of Michigan in 1939 and a Juris Doctor from the University of Michigan Law School in 1942. He was a lieutenant in the United States Naval Reserve during World War II, from 1942 to 1946. He was a law clerk to Judge Charles Casper Simons of the United States Court of Appeals for the Sixth Circuit from 1946 to 1947, and was then in private practice in Detroit, Michigan from 1947 to 1951. He was a special Assistant United States Attorney for the Eastern District of Michigan from 1951 to 1952, returning to private practice from 1953 to 1954. He was a member of the Michigan Board of Tax Appeals in 1954, and a deputy state attorney general of Michigan from 1954 to 1956. He was a judge on the 3rd Judicial Circuit in Detroit from 1956 to 1980.

== Federal judicial service ==
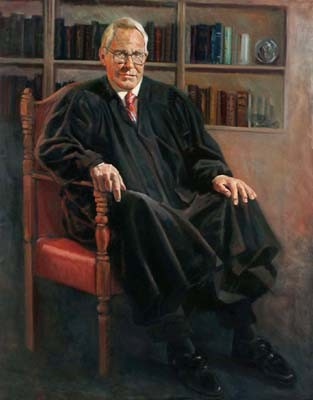
Judicial portrait of Gilmore, c. 1991, by Robert Maniscalco.

On May 22, 1980, Gilmore was nominated by President Jimmy Carter to a seat on the United States District Court for the Eastern District of Michigan vacated by Judge Cornelia Groefsema Kennedy. He was confirmed by the United States Senate on June 18, 1980, and received his commission the same day. He assumed senior status on May 1, 1991, serving in that status until his death on January 25, 2010, in Grosse Point, Michigan.

== Sources ==
Legal offices
Preceded by Cornelia Groefsema Kennedy	Judge of the United States District Court for the Eastern District of Michigan; 1980–1991	Succeeded by John Corbett O'Meara
