= David Viviano =

American judge (born 1971)

Associate Justice of the Michigan Supreme Court
- In office February 27, 2013 – January 1, 2025
- Appointed by: Rick Snyder
- Preceded by: Diane Hathaway
- Succeeded by: Kimberly Thomas

Personal details
- Born: David Francis Viviano; December 8, 1971 (age 54)
- Party: Republican
- Education: Hillsdale College (BA); University of Michigan (JD)

David Francis Viviano (born December 8, 1971) is a former justice of the Michigan Supreme Court, appointed by Governor Rick Snyder on February 27, 2013, to fill the vacancy created by the resignation of Justice Diane Hathaway. Prior to that, Viviano was the Chief Judge of the Macomb County Circuit Court.

To retain his seat on the Michigan Supreme Court, Viviano won the general election on November 4, 2014 with 62.1% of votes. Viviano won a full term in 2016 with more than 67% of votes and did not seek a second full term in 2024.

== Early life and education ==
Viviano earned a bachelor's degree from Hillsdale College and his Juris Doctor degree from the University of Michigan Law School.

== Notable decisions ==
In 2022, Viviano, joined by Justice Brian Zahra, dissented from a decision of the Michigan Supreme Court ordering the Board of State Canvassers to allow a ballot proposition that would amend the Michigan Constitution to provide for a right to abortion before viability with limitations afterward. Viviano claimed that the proposed amendment did not comply with Michigan's "full text" requirement for ballot propositions because, while the full text may have been present, the text used different "spaces" than those found in the Michigan Constitution. Although 753,759 Michigan voters had signed the initiative, Viviano wrote, "[t]he failure to include the spaces presents the amendment in a manner difficult to read and comprehend. Thus, it may have the right words in the right order—as the majority here suggests—but the lack of critical word spaces renders the remaining text much more difficult to read and comprehend, and therefore something less than the 'full text' required by the Constitution and statutes."

Legal offices
Preceded by Diane Hathaway	Associate Justice of the Michigan Supreme Court; 2013–2025	Succeeded by Kimberly Thomas
