= Richard H. Bernstein =

American judge (born 1974)

Richard Bernstein
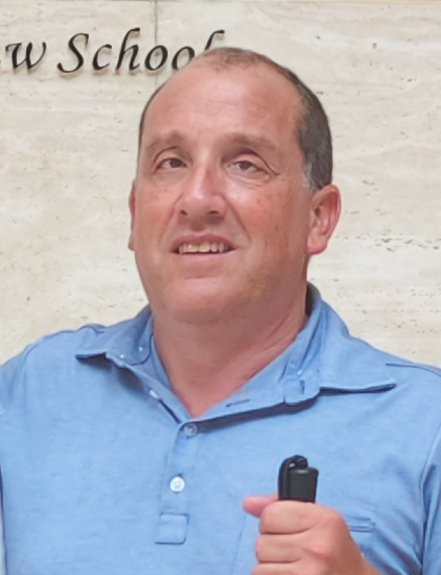
- Bernstein, photographed in 2024

Associate Justice of the Michigan Supreme Court
- Incumbent
- Assumed office January 1, 2015
- Preceded by: Michael Cavanagh

Personal details
- Born: Richard Howard Bernstein; November 9, 1974 (age 51) Detroit, Michigan, U.S.
- Party: Democratic
- Education: University of Michigan (BA); Northwestern University (JD)
- Website: Official website

Richard Howard Bernstein (born November 9, 1974) is an American lawyer who has served as an associate justice of the Michigan Supreme Court since 2015. He practiced at The Law Offices of Sam Bernstein, his father's law office, in Farmington Hills, Michigan, before being elected to the Michigan Supreme Court. He was an adjunct professor at the University of Michigan and served on the Wayne State University Board of Governors for one eight-year term, including two years as vice chair and two more as chair until deciding not to seek re-election in 2010 for a second term beginning in 2011. In November 2014, Bernstein was elected to serve an 8-year term on the Michigan Supreme Court. Bernstein has been classified as legally blind since birth as a result of retinitis pigmentosa.

== Education ==
Bernstein attended Andover High School in the Bloomfield Hills School District of Bloomfield Hills, Michigan. In 1996, he received his Bachelor of Arts summa cum laude from the University of Michigan, where he was Phi Beta Kappa, Phi Kappa Phi and student body president of the College of Literature, Science and Arts.

For the ability to enter Northwestern University School of Law, Bernstein fought the Law School Admissions Council against the "visual bias" of the Law School Admission Test (LSAT), claiming the test discriminates against the blind because of its requirements for interpreting visual material. He argued the test was no barometer of success in law school. Four universities agreed: Northwestern University, the University of Virginia, the University of Wisconsin and Vanderbilt University. At the time he was admitted, he was the only blind person in the law school.

To complete his studies, Bernstein would memorize lectures and have notes read to him to memorize. For tests, he memorized test questions and entire fact patterns (the basis for the questions), some of which would be as long as 5 pages. The fact patterns would be repeatedly read to him until he committed the entire question to memory and could then provide an answer. He reportedly worked seven days a week for 13 hours each day.

He received a Juris Doctor from the Northwestern University School of Law in 1999.

== Career ==
Bernstein joined the Law Offices of Sam Bernstein after graduating from Northwestern University School of Law. He is licensed to practice law in the states of Michigan and New York.

Much of Bernstein's legal work has focused on protecting the rights of people with disabilities, which is done pro bono. He successfully represented disabled Detroit residents in 2004 in an action against the City of Detroit to fix wheelchair lifts on buses as required by federal legislation. He also represented the Paralyzed Veterans of America in 2007 in an action against the University of Michigan for failing to include adequate accommodations for spectators with disabilities when planning renovations for the stadium. The suit resulted in increased seating for people with disabilities and their companions and enhanced accessible parking, restrooms and concessions. Also in 2007, Bernstein filed a lawsuit on behalf of people with disabilities, asserting that Oakland County, Michigan violated the Americans with Disabilities Act of 1990 because its road construction plans did not include mechanisms for people with visual impairments, people in wheelchairs and others with disabilities to safely cross the street at roundabouts. The County eventually agreed to install special safety equipment so that pedestrians, with or without disabilities, can activate traffic signals to stop traffic and get visual and audio confirmation that vehicles actually stopped, before crossing roundabout intersections.

=== International work ===
In June 2010, Bernstein visited Israel through OneFamily Fund in Jerusalem to meet with survivors of terrorist attacks in Sderot. OneFamily Fund is an organization working to raise awareness for the effects of terrorism on the people of Israel and provides direct financial, legal and emotional assistance to terror victims. Bernstein was invited to discuss his advocacy work, fighting for the rights of people with disabilities, and how victims of terror can cope with disabilities caused by the attacks they have experienced.

In the fall of 2010, Bernstein was asked by the government of Ecuador in South America to participate in a speaking tour demonstrating the abilities and possible achievements of disabled people to rally support for disabled rights. While in the country, he spoke to mainstream media and Ecuadorian universities, including Colegio Americano de Quito.

Following his work in Israel and Ecuador, Bernstein also has visited Sydney, Melbourne, the Gold Coast, London and São Paulo discussing special education and/or athletics programs promoting greater inclusion as part of his advocacy for disabled rights. In 2013, he did 20 speaking engagements in 10 days to the audiences throughout Australia and London.

Returning to Australia in March 2014, he did a series of events, one of which was at the annual Gawith Lecture put on by Inclusion Melbourne. The trip included a visit to Victoria for a bipartisan lunch at Parliament House in Victoria (Australia), where he gave an address focused on inclusiveness for individuals with disabilities. He also gave a keynote speech at the Maccabi Victoria All Abilities Project Launch in Armadale, Victoria and spoke at the Milk and Honey Café in Caulfield as part of the Access Inspiration Series, in which he was accompanied by Member for Caulfield David Southwick MP.

=== Campaign for Michigan Attorney General ===
In 2010, Richard Bernstein ran for the Democratic Nomination for Attorney General in the State of Michigan. He ran on a platform of public advocacy and active litigation, facing primary opponent David Leyton. The two faced off at the endorsing convention on April 17, 2010. Bernstein lost the Michigan Democratic Party endorsement to Leyton in one of the closest races for the Democratic nomination in the state, with a slim margin of just 153.6 proportional votes.

=== Michigan Supreme Court ===
In 2014, Richard Bernstein ran for Supreme Court, and won. He received 29 percent of the statewide vote, receiving 1.29 million votes. He began his term January 2015, working in Lansing, Michigan.

==== Controversies ====
In 2023, Bernstein drew controversy after Michigan Supreme Court Justice Kyra Harris Bolden hired Pete Martel, who spent fourteen years in prison for armed robbery before attending Wayne State University School of Law, as a law clerk. Bernstein publicly stated that he was "completely disgusted" by Bolden's decision to hire Martel as a law clerk and claimed that he and Justice Bolden "don't share the same values." He also claimed that Bolden's decision to hire Martel would reflect poorly on the entire court and that it was not "fair to the police and the prosecutors" to have a convicted felon working for the court. Bolden confirmed that Martel had resigned from his position as a law clerk due to Bernstein's comments and explained that Martel "did not want to be a distraction or in any way divert the court from its important work." On January 9, 2023, Bernstein issued a statement saying he apologized to Justice Kyra Harris Bolden in person at the Hall of Justice and that she accepted his apology.

In 2008 a spoof of the Bernstein Law Firm television ads began to appear on the internet in the Detroit Metro Area. The spoof was part of a series of ad spoofs entitled "Not So Pure Michigan". In the spoof Richard "Goldstein" of the "Goldstein Law Firm", Bernstein is mockingly shown as a severely disabled man. The ad drew quick criticism from many members of the public; Bernstein, however, took no offense, even thinking it funny.

== Public life ==
Bernstein was elected during a Michigan statewide election to the Wayne State University Board of Governors in November 2002 at the age of 28. In February 2009, the Board unanimously voted Bernstein as its chair; he previously served two years as Vice Chair. His term on the Board concluded at the end of 2010. He is reported as the first blind person to run for statewide office in Michigan.

Among Bernstein's initiatives as chair of the Board of Governors, he led the Board in unanimously passing a resolution in September 2009 regarding the Amazon Kindle reader. The action was prompted by a federal lawsuit filed by the National Federation of the Blind, based in Baltimore, in partnership with the American Council of the Blind against Arizona State University, to block the university from using the Kindle as a way to distribute electronic textbooks, stating the devices are not accessible by blind students. The Board passed a resolution asking Amazon to make the Kindle user-friendly for blind students and forbid the use of Kindle e-books at Wayne State University until they were made accessible to visually impaired students. After WSU's resolution, the University of Wisconsin-Madison and Syracuse University stopped the use of Kindles on campus. On December 7, 2009, Amazon announced it would add audible menus and extra large fonts to make its e-book more accessible to blind and vision impaired students.

Bernstein was the creator and host of the segment, "Making a Difference," which aired on CBS in Detroit. The show featured community volunteers in the Detroit metropolitan area. He also has contributed to The Detroit News and the Detroit Free Press. Announced on September 13, 2011, Bernstein and Pulitzer Prize winner Angelo Henderson co-host together a one-hour legal radio show called "Fighting for Justice" on WCHB (1200) in Metro Detroit.

Bernstein has taught a political science course on law and social change in the political science department at the University of Michigan.

== Personal life ==
In his spare time, Bernstein is a runner, completing 17 marathons, including marathons in New York, Detroit, Jerusalem, Miami and Los Angeles, before being severely injured by a speeding cyclist in Central Park in August 2012. On Sunday, November 3, 2013, he completed his 18th marathon in New York City. At the age of 34, he completed the Ironman Triathlon in Coeur d'Alene, Idaho on June 22, 2008. The Ironman includes a 112-mile (180 km) bike ride, 42.195-kilometre (26.219 mi) marathon and 2.4-mile (3.9 km) swim, without a break. Bernstein finished the Ironman in 14 hours and 36 minutes. In October 2009, Bernstein ran the Detroit Free Press/Flagstar Bank marathon with athletes from Wayne State University serving as his guides. At the age of 37, Bernstein completed the Half Israman triathlon, a competition like the Ironman, taking place in Eilat, Israel in January 2011. The Half Israman consists of a 1.9 km swim in the Red Sea, a 90 km cycle and a 21.1 km run. Bernstein completed the triathlon, as the competition's first blind competitor, with the assistance of a pilot of the Israeli Air Force, part of the Israel Defense Forces.

== Awards and honors ==
Bernstein has received recognition from various organizations for his work as a lawyer. He was named a 2009 Leader in the Law by Michigan Lawyers Weekly,

Bernstein received the "Michiganian of the Year" award from The Detroit News, identified as one of Crain's Detroit Business' "40 Under 40" and selected by The Young Lawyers Section of the State Bar of Michigan as the 2003–2004 Regeana Myrick Outstanding Young Lawyer Award recipient. In 2006, he won CNN's "Keeping Them Honest" award for his legal work on behalf of wheelchair users in Detroit. He also was awarded the John W. Cummiskey Pro Bono Award from the State Bar of Michigan in 2008. On February 8, 2012, Bernstein was announced as one of "Brooks' Elite 40 Under 40" by County Executive L. Brooks Patterson of Oakland County, Michigan.

He has earned various awards for his community involvement, including the Spirit of Detroit Award from the Detroit City Council for his work establishing the Sarcoidosis Center of Excellence, a Special Recognition Award from the Macomb Intermediate School District for advocacy on behalf students with disabilities and their parents, the Children's Advocate Award from the National Council of Jewish Women for his advocacy work that benefited disadvantaged children, and a Volunteer of the Year from the Jewish Home and Aging Services. On October 28, 2011, Bernstein received the University of Michigan 2011 James T. Neubacher Award, presented by U-M Regent Julia Donovan Darlow, for demonstrating exceptional leadership and advocacy in generating awareness and acceptance for disabled rights. On April 26, 2013, Bernstein was awarded the Toastmaster Communication and Leadership Award by Toastmasters International for using his leadership and communication experience to achieve his goals.

For his athletic efforts, Bernstein was honored by the Michigan Governor's Council on Physical Fitness for overcoming great challenges and continuing to pursue physical activity as a daily routine. In 2010, he was honored by the Michigan Sports Hall of Fame with the Tony Filippis Courage Award for his athleticism despite his disability. He was inducted into the National Jewish Sports Hall of Fame and Museum on April 21, 2013. The Dr. Martin Luther King Jr. Task Force Inc. selected Bernstein for the President Abraham Lincoln Equality Award because of his advocacy in the disabled community.

== See also ==
- List of Jewish American jurists

Legal offices
Preceded by Michael Cavanagh	Associate Justice of the Michigan Supreme Court; 2015–present	Incumbent
