= Brian K. Zahra =

American judge (born 1960)

Brian Zahra

Associate Justice of the Michigan Supreme Court
- Incumbent
- Assumed office January 14, 2011
- Appointed by: Rick Snyder
- Preceded by: Maura D. Corrigan

Personal details
- Born: January 9, 1960 (age 66)
- Party: Republican
- Spouses: Alyssa Jones (m. 1987; div. 1993) Suzanne Zahara (after 1993)
- Education: Wayne State University (BA); University of Detroit (JD)

Brian K. Zahra (born January 9, 1960) is a justice of the Michigan Supreme Court. He was appointed to fill a vacancy by Governor Rick Snyder in 2011. Zahra won his bid for reelection in 2022 to retain his seat for eight more years, per the Michigan Constitution.

== Education ==
Zahra attended Divine Child High School and Wayne State University where he was a member of the Pi Kappa Alpha fraternity (PIKE) and worked his way through college with the help of his family who helped him open a health and beauty-aid store in Detroit, which he expanded into a full grocery store. He subsequently graduated from the University of Detroit Mercy School of Law with honors in 1987. While in law school he was a member of the Law Review and served as Articles Editor of the State Bar of Michigan’s Corporation and Finance Business Law Journal.

== Career ==
Upon graduating law school, Zahra clerked for Judge Lawrence Zatkoff of the United States District Court for the Eastern District of Michigan until he joined the Detroit law firm of Dickinson, Wright, Moon, Van Dusen & Freeman in 1989. He also served as a Wayne County Circuit Court judge from 1994 to 1998 and was appointed to the Michigan Court of Appeals by Republican governor John Engler in 1999. In 2004, he was nominated and ran for the Michigan Supreme Court. While losing that bid for election, he remained on the Court of Appeals. Zahra then went on to serve as Chief Judge Pro Tem for the Court of Appeals from December 2005 to January 2007.

On January 11, 2011, Republican Governor Rick Snyder appointed Zahra to replace Maura Corrigan, who was in turn appointed to head the Michigan Department of Human Services. Governor Snyder's appointment of Zahra maintained the Republican nominees' 4-3 majority.

Zahra served as an adjunct professor at the University of Detroit Law School, teaching evidence, and he has served on various bar and legislative committees, including the advisory committee for the Michigan Judicial Institute Domestic Violence Benchbook and the Domestic Violence Legislation Implementation Task Force. Zahra is a member of the Federalist Society, which he has served as secretary and vice-president, and he served as a member of the board of directors of the Catholic Lawyers Society.

== Judicial philosophy ==
Zahra characterizes himself as a rule of law judge advocating judicial restraint. In a 2007 forum, he spoke of his respect for the separation of powers, noting the importance of "leaving to the legislature the significant policy questions of the day."

== Notable court decisions ==
While on the Michigan Court of Appeals, Zahra joined Judges Kurtis T. Wilder and Joel Hoekstra in upholding a state constitutional amendment barring public employers from recognizing same-sex unions. In Pride at Work v. Granholm, the three judge panel unanimously struck down a ruling by an Ingham County court judge and ruled that domestic partner benefit plans were unconstitutional.

In 2022, Zahra dissented from a Michigan Supreme Court decision ordering the Board of State Canvassers to allow voters to vote on a ballot proposition that would amend the Michigan Constitution to provide for a limited right to abortion. Zahra's dissent was strongly criticized by other members of the Michigan Supreme Court.

== Personal life ==
Zahra married Alyssa Jones (née Watson, born c. 1963) in 1987 and divorced her in 1993. Zahra resides in Northville Township with his second wife Suzanne and their two children.

=== Abortion allegation ===
In November 2022, Zahra's ex-wife Alyssa Jones alleged that she underwent an abortion in 1983 after becoming pregnant by Zahra, when he was 23-years old and unwed. According to Jones, she and Zahra were in agreement to pursue the abortion and did not consider other options. She noted that Zahra identified the abortion clinic, made the appointment, and drove Jones to the clinic but did not enter it with her. Jones noted that she decided to share the details of her abortion with the public after Zahra worked to prevent an abortion amendment from appearing on the 2022 state ballot, which she viewed as hypocritical. She noted, “I'm grateful I had a choice, and I think he's grateful he had a choice.” Zahra has not responded to the allegations.

Legal offices
Preceded by Maura D. Corrigan	Associate Justice of the Michigan Supreme Court; 2011–present	Incumbent
