= Michigan Supreme Court =

Highest court in the U.S. state of Michigan

Coordinates: 42.733664°N 84.565431°W

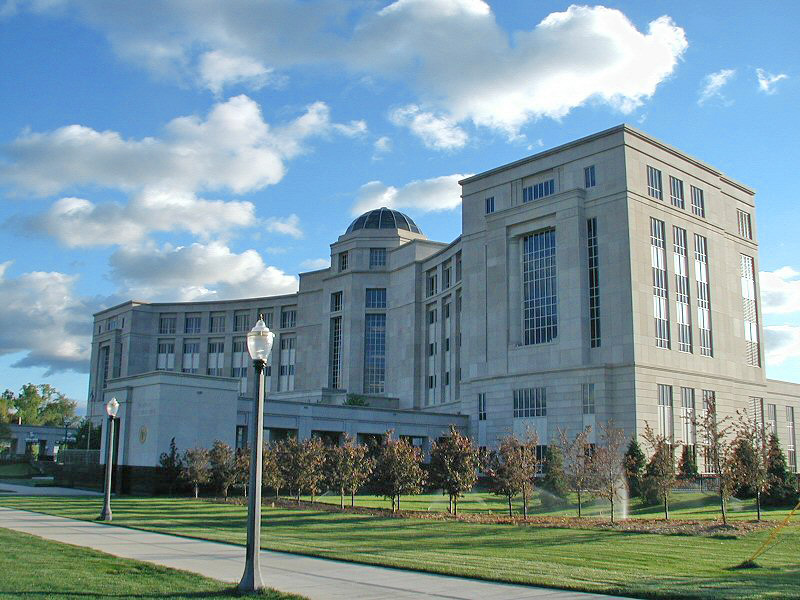
- The Michigan Hall of Justice in 2011
- Interactive map of Michigan Supreme Court
- Established: 1836
- Location: Lansing, Michigan, United States
- Composition method: Semipartisan election
- Authorised by: Michigan Constitution
- Appeals to: Supreme Court of the United States
- Judge term length: 8 years
- Number of positions: 7 (including chief justice)
- Website: courts.michigan.gov

Chief Justice
- Currently: Megan Cavanagh
- Since: April 15, 2025

The Michigan Supreme Court is the highest court in the U.S. state of Michigan. It is Michigan's court of last resort and consists of seven justices. The court is in the Michigan Hall of Justice at 925 Ottawa Street in Lansing, the state capital.

== Operations ==
Each year, the Michigan Supreme Court receives approximately 2,000 new case filings. In most cases, the litigants seek review of Michigan Court of Appeals decisions, but the court also hears cases of attorney misconduct (through a bifurcated disciplinary system comprising an investigation and prosecution agency – the Attorney Grievance Commission – and a separate adjudicative agency – the Attorney Discipline Board), judicial misconduct (through the Judicial Tenure Commission), as well as a small number of matters over which the court has original jurisdiction.

In all cases filed with it, the court issues a decision by order or opinion. The court's opinions and orders are reported in an official publication, Michigan Reports, and in Thomson West's privately published North Western Reporter.

=== Administration of the courts ===
The Michigan Supreme Court's other duties include overseeing the operations of all state trial courts. It is assisted in this endeavor by the State Court Administrative Office, one of its agencies. The court's responsibilities also include a public comment process for changes to court rules, rules of evidence, and other administrative matters. The court has broad superintending control power over all the state courts in Michigan.

Article 6, Section 30 of the Michigan Constitution creates the Michigan Judicial Tenure Commission. This agency within the judiciary has jurisdiction over allegations of judicial misconduct, misbehavior, and infirmity. The Supreme Court is given original, superintending control power and appellate jurisdiction over the issue of penalty (up to and including removal of judges from office).

== History ==
The Michigan Supreme Court can be dated back to the Supreme Court of Michigan Territory, established in 1805 with three justices. These justices served for indefinite terms. In 1823, the terms of justices were limited to four years.

The Michigan Supreme Court was the only court created by the first Michigan constitution in 1835. It had three members and each oversaw one of the three judicial circuits in Detroit, Ann Arbor, and Kalamazoo. The court needed a quorum of two to operate, and members were appointed to seven-year terms by the governor with the consent of the senate. In 1838, Justice William A. Fletcher proposed a new plan for the court that the legislature approved. This increased the number of circuits to four and thus expanded the bench to four justices, but left the quorum at two.

In 1848, the court was expanded to five justices, and the 1850 Michigan constitution provided that they be elected for six-year terms. In 1858, the circuit courts were split from the Supreme Court to allow justices to serve exclusively on the Michigan Supreme Court. The number of seats was reduced to four, with one member to serve as chief justice.

In 1887, the court was expanded to five justices, each serving for ten years. It was again expanded in 1903 to eight justices serving terms of eight years. In 1964, the new state constitution provided that the next justice to leave the court would not be replaced, reducing the court to seven members. This was achieved when Justice Theodore Souris declined to run for re-election in 1968, leaving the court with seven members since January 1, 1969.

== Composition ==
The Michigan Supreme Court consists of seven justices who are elected to eight-year terms. State supreme court candidates are nominated by political parties but elected on a nonpartisan ballot. Candidates must be qualified electors, licensed to practice law in Michigan for at least five years, and under 70 years of age at the time of election. The Michigan Constitution allows vacancies on the state supreme court to be initially filled by the governor, with that appointee serving until the next general election, when the elected winner is seated to fill the remaining portion of the vacated term. Every two years, the justices elect a member of the court to serve as chief justice.

=== Current justices ===
Following the 2012 election, the court had a 4–3 Republican majority, with Robert P. Young Jr. serving as chief justice. After Justice Diane Hathaway's resignation and David Viviano's appointment in 2013, there was a 5–2 Republican majority. After the 2018 election, the court reverted to a 4–3 Republican majority with the election of Megan Cavanagh.

In 2020, Bridget Mary McCormack was re-elected, and Elizabeth M. Welch was elected for her first term, giving the Democrats a 4–3 majority on the court starting January 1, 2021. This also made the court majority female for the fourth time in state history. With the election of Kimberly Thomas to succeed retiring Justice David Viviano in 2024, Democrats increased their advantage to a 5–2 majority on the court, starting January 1, 2025. Months later, Democrats increased their majority on the court to 6–1 following the resignation of Chief Justice Elizabeth Clement and the appointment of Noah Hood.

The current justices of the Michigan Supreme Court are:

Name	Born	Start	Chief term	Term ends	Mandatory retirement (Note: Justices are barred from running for additional terms after the age of 70.)	Party	Appointer	Law school
Megan Cavanagh, Chief Justice	July 17, 1971 (age 55)	January 1, 2019	2025–present	2034	2042	Democratic	—N/a (Note: Took office after being elected in a nonpartisan election.)	Wayne
Brian K. Zahra	January 9, 1960 (age 66)	January 14, 2011	–	2030	2030	Republican	Rick Snyder (R) (Note: Justice was subsequently elected in their own right in a nonpartisan election.)	Detroit Mercy
Richard H. Bernstein	November 9, 1974 (age 51)	January 1, 2015	–	2030	2046	Democratic	—N/a	Northwestern
Elizabeth M. Welch	September 20, 1970 (age 56)	January 1, 2021	–	2028	2044	Democratic	—N/a	Ohio State
Kyra Harris Bolden	July 31, 1988 (age 38)	January 1, 2023	–	2028	2060	Democratic	Gretchen Whitmer (D)	Detroit Mercy
Kimberly Thomas	1971 or 1972 (age 54–55)	January 1, 2025	–	2032	2048	Democratic	—N/a	Harvard
Noah Hood	1986 (age 39–40)	May 27, 2025	–	2034	2060	Democratic	Gretchen Whitmer (D)	Harvard

== See also ==
- Judiciary of Michigan
