= George W. Bush Supreme Court candidates =

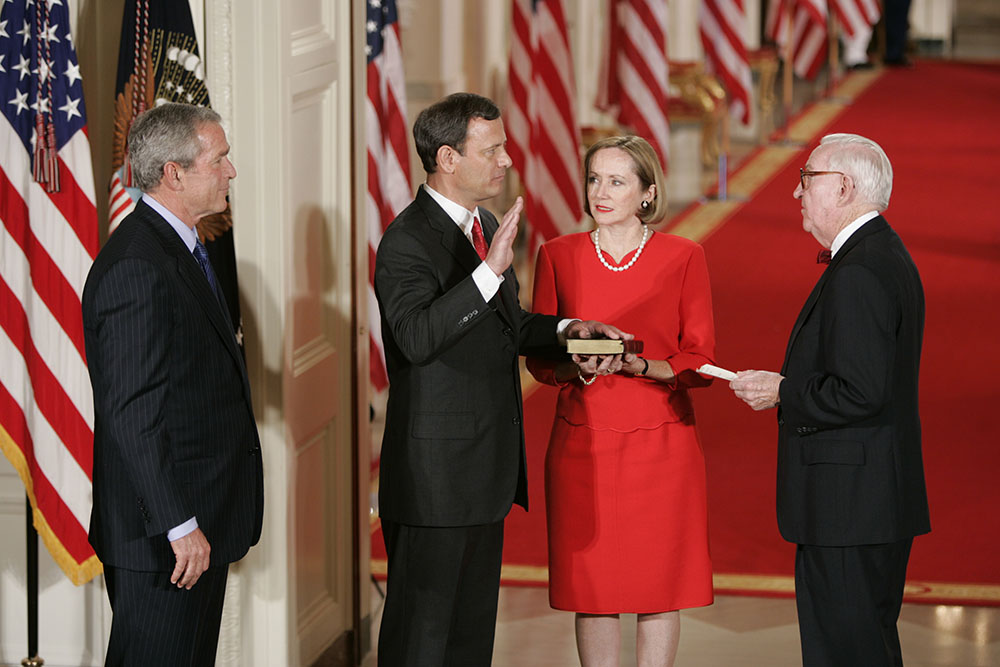
John Roberts is sworn in as chief justice by senior Associate Justice John Paul Stevens in the East Room of the White House on the same day as his confirmation, September 29, 2005.

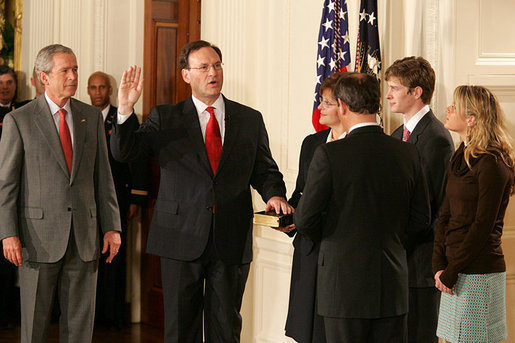
Samuel Alito is sworn in as an associate justice by Chief Justice John Roberts in the East Room of the White House on the day after his confirmation, February 1, 2006.

Speculation abounded over potential nominations to the Supreme Court of the United States by President George W. Bush since before his presidency.

In the summer of 2005, this speculation became newsworthy due to the announcement of the retirement of Associate Justice Sandra Day O'Connor on July 1. President Bush announced federal appellate judge John Roberts as O'Connor's replacement on July 19.

On September 5, two days after the death of Chief Justice William Rehnquist, Bush renominated Roberts as the 17th chief justice of the United States. He was confirmed by the United States Senate on September 29, 2005.

On October 3, Bush nominated White House Counsel Harriet Miers to succeed O'Connor. However, Miers withdrew her nomination on October 27 after facing significant opposition.

On October 31, Bush nominated another federal appellate judge, Samuel Alito, as his new choice to replace O'Connor. Alito was confirmed as the 110th justice of the Supreme Court on January 31, 2006.

== Overview ==
Throughout much of the history of the United States, the Supreme Court of the United States was clearly the least powerful branch of the government, and nominations to that body, although important, were not the source of great political controversy as they are today. Until the death of Chief Justice Rehnquist in 2005, the composition of the Supreme Court had remained unchanged since 1994, the second longest time period without a membership change in U.S. history (the longest having been from 1812 to 1823).

Furthermore, the court at the time had been sharply divided on a number of high-profile issues, including abortion rights, affirmative action, the extent of Congressional power under the Commerce Clause, eminent domain, gay rights, the separation of church and state under the Establishment Clause, sovereign immunity, and states' rights. The number of close votes in cases involving these areas suggested that a change of one or two key justices could completely shift the thinking of the Court on such issues.

== Politics ==
When asked about the kind of justices he would appoint to the Supreme Court, President George W. Bush responded: "I would pick people that would be strict constructionists. We've got plenty of lawmakers in Washington, D.C. Legislators make law. Judges interpret the Constitution. ... And that's the kind of judge I'm going to put on there." In more detail, Bush in 1999 told reporter Fred Barnes of the conservative magazine The Weekly Standard that he would nominate judges to the court in the mold of originalist Justice Antonin Scalia.

=== The filibuster ===
Soon after President Bush's first inauguration in January 2001, many liberal academics became worried that he would begin packing the federal judiciary with conservative jurists. Yale law professor Bruce Ackerman, writing in the February 2001 edition of The American Prospect, encouraged the use of the filibuster to stop Bush from placing any nominee on the Supreme Court during his first term. In addition, law professors Cass Sunstein (University of Chicago) and Laurence Tribe (Harvard), along with Marcia Greenberger of the National Women's Law Center, counseled Senate Democrats in April 2001 "to scrutinize judicial nominees more closely than ever." Specifically, they said, "there was no obligation to confirm someone just because they are scholarly or erudite."

On May 9, 2001, President Bush announced his first eleven court of appeals nominees in a special White House ceremony. There was immediate concern expressed by Senate Democrats and liberal groups like the Alliance for Justice. Democratic Senator Chuck Schumer said that the White House was "trying to create the most ideological bench in the history of the nation."

From June 2001 to January 2003, when the Senate was controlled by the Democrats, the most conservative appellate nominees were stalled in the Senate Judiciary Committee and never given hearings or committee votes. However, after the 2002 mid-term elections in which the Republicans regained control of the Senate by a 51–49 margin, these same nominees began to be moved through the now Republican-controlled Judiciary Committee.

With no other way to block confirmation, the Senate Democrats started to filibuster judicial nominees when they came before the full Senate for final consideration. This forced supporters of the nomination to move to invoke cloture, which, if agreed to by a three-fifths supermajority vote, would allow debate to end and force a final vote on confirmation. On February 12, 2003, Miguel Estrada, a nominee for the D.C. Circuit, became the first court of appeals nominee ever to be filibustered. Later, nine other conservative circuit court nominees were also filibustered. These nine were Priscilla Owen, Charles W. Pickering, Carolyn Kuhl, David McKeague, Henry Saad, Richard Allen Griffin, William H. Pryor Jr., William Myers III and Janice Rogers Brown. Three of the nominees (Estrada, Pickering and Kuhl) withdrew their nominations before the end of the 108th Congress.

=== The “nuclear option” ===
As a result of these ten filibusters, Senate Republicans began to threaten to change the existing Senate rules by using what Senator Trent Lott termed the "nuclear option". This change in rules would eliminate the use of the filibuster to prevent judicial confirmation votes. However, with only a two-vote majority, the Republicans were in a weak position to implement this procedural maneuver.

Circumstances changed in 2005, due to the 2004 elections. With President Bush winning re-election and the Republicans increasing their Senate majority to 55–45 for the 109th Congress, the "nuclear option" became a more viable strategy to ensure confirmation. On May 24, 2005, seven moderate senators of each party, called the Gang of 14, in a deal to avoid the use of the "nuclear option", agreed to drop the filibuster against three of the seven remaining affected court of appeals nominees (Owen, Brown, and Pryor) but not two others (Saad and Myers). In addition, the senators in the group agreed to block future judicial filibusters except in cases involving "extraordinary circumstances".

As a direct result of the deal, the two filibustered nominees not mentioned in it (McKeague and Griffin) were confirmed. Despite these agreements, however, some observers noted that the chances were still high that the Democrats would filibuster any of the ten originally filibustered nominees if subsequently nominated to the Supreme Court, especially Owen, Pryor or Brown. There was also speculation that the Democrats would filibuster any Supreme Court nominee who would change the ideological composition of the court.

Historically, although there have been several unsuccessful Supreme Court nominations, only one has been defeated because its opponents were able to successfully maintain a filibuster. This occurred in 1968, when Senate supporters of incumbent Associate Justice Abe Fortas’ nomination to succeed Earl Warren as chief justice lost a vote to invoke cloture by a 45–43 vote, prompting President Lyndon Johnson to withdraw the nomination.

When conservative judge John Roberts was nominated to succeed conservative Chief Justice William Rehnquist in September 2005, the confirmation process went relatively smoothly with no threat of a filibuster. Four months later, the filibuster conjecture was disproved. When Bush chose another conservative judge, Samuel Alito, to replace moderate Associate Justice Sandra Day O'Connor, opponents of Alito could not generate enough votes to prevent cloture from being invoked (72–25) on his nomination. The next day, January 31, 2006, the Senate confirmed the Alito nomination 58–42.

=== Consultations with the U.S. Senate ===
As the 2004–2005 term of the Supreme Court ended, there was a flurry of rumors that Rehnquist, who was undergoing treatment for thyroid cancer, would soon retire. On June 27, 2005, Senate Minority Leader Harry Reid suggested that the next appointment to the Court should come from outside the judiciary. Reid suggested the appointment of one of four Republican Senators, none of whom possessed previous judicial experience: Mel Martinez, Mike DeWine, Mike Crapo and Lindsey Graham. The list did not include the name of Republican Senator John Cornyn of Texas, a former justice on the Texas Supreme Court. Reid declined to address the omission.

Unexpectedly, on July 1, 2005, it was not Rehnquist who announced his retirement, but O'Connor. On July 12, Bush met at the White House with the party leaders and ranking Judiciary Committee members from the two major parties – Republicans Bill Frist and Arlen Specter, and Democrats Reid and Patrick Leahy – to discuss the nomination process. During the meeting, the Democrats offered the President the names of three "moderate" Hispanic federal judges that they could accept: Sonia Sotomayor of the Second Circuit, Edward Prado of the Fifth Circuit, and Ricardo Hinojosa, a district court judge from Texas. Reid later told the press he was disappointed that the President had not chosen to discuss his own choice of possible candidates with the Democrats. In the conservative magazine National Review, the three candidates suggested by the Democrats were quickly dismissed as being offered in bad faith because they were too liberal for a conservative president to seriously consider. Sotomayor was later nominated to the Supreme Court by President Barack Obama (a Democrat) and confirmed as an associate justice in 2009.

On the same day as the president's bi-partisan leadership meeting, First Lady Laura Bush stated in a Today show interview during an official visit to South Africa a preference for her husband to nominate a woman to O'Connor's seat. Bush was surprised at his wife's public comments about selecting a replacement for O'Connor, but said he would be open to hearing her advice when she returned from her trip.

=== John Roberts nomination ===
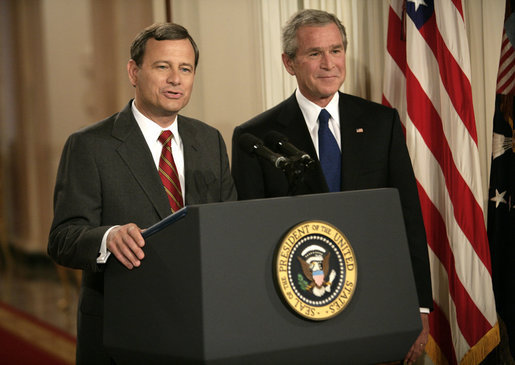
John Roberts, now chief justice, is pictured here with President Bush at the announcement of his first nomination on July 19, 2005.

On the evening of July 19, 2005, Bush announced his first Supreme Court nominee, choosing John Roberts, a highly regarded former Supreme Court litigator and conservative judge on the D.C. Circuit Court of Appeals to succeed retiring Associate Justice O'Connor. During the day leading up to the announcement, there had been much media speculation that one of either two female judges on the Fifth Circuit would be selected: moderate Edith Brown Clement or conservative Edith Jones. Clement was considered the frontrunner. About an hour before the televised announcement, however, information was leaked to the press concerning the choice of Roberts.

On September 3, 2005, Chief Justice Rehnquist died. Three days later, on September 6, Bush officially nominated Roberts to be the next chief justice, and simultaneously withdrew Roberts's then-pending nomination to be an associate justice, once again leaving no nominee to replace O'Connor. Hearings on the Roberts associate justice nomination, set to begin on September 6, were cancelled, and rescheduled hearings, on the chief justice nomination, began on September 12.

=== Possible O'Connor replacements ===
On September 6, Specter encouraged the President to fill O'Connor's position with a woman, saying that the Supreme Court should have a minimum of two female justices. On September 9, Laura Bush reiterated her previous wish to also see a female nominee.

On the Thursday before Roberts' confirmation hearing commenced, one of Reid's aides said that the nomination of several candidates said to be on the president's short list to replace O'Connor—conservative appellate Judges J. Michael Luttig, Emilio Garza and Edith Jones—would be unacceptable to the Democrats, implying that any of them would be filibustered. Several days later, Specter made it known that he felt that it was too early for Bush to elevate Attorney General Alberto Gonzales to the Supreme Court.

Roberts' confirmation hearing for chief justice was held from Monday, September 12, to Friday, September 16. During the week of the hearing, there was much talk that Priscilla Owen would be the next nominee, but columnist Robert Novak reported that by Friday, Reid had told Frist that Judge Owen would also be filibustered if chosen.

On Wednesday, September 21, Bush had another meeting with Senators Frist, Specter, Reid and Leahy to discuss possible Supreme Court nominations. On the day before, Laura Bush mentioned publicly for the third time that she would like to see a female nominee. At the same time, Reid stated that the nomination of any of the previously filibustered appellate nominees would be viewed by the Democrats as "a poke in the eye with a sharp stick". He restated this position during the meeting with the President when he warned against nominating either Brown or Owen. Again, Reid and Leahy offered the names of appeals court Judges Sotomayor and Prado along with district court Judge Hinojosa. Again, Bush did not offer any names of his own to discuss. On Thursday, September 22, Roberts' nomination was voted out of the Senate Judiciary Committee by a bipartisan vote of 13–5.

During a press conference on Monday, September 26, Bush implied that his next nominee would be either a woman or a minority. In making his decision concerning O'Connor's replacement, he said he would keep in mind that, "diversity is one of the strengths of the country". John Roberts was confirmed by the United States Senate on Thursday, September 29, by a vote of 78—22 and was sworn in both privately and publicly later the same day.

During the evening of Sunday, October 2, John Fund, a columnist for the Wall Street Journal, announced on the radio show of blogger Matt Drudge that his sources had told him that the nominee would be moderate Hispanic Judge Consuelo M. Callahan of the Ninth Circuit. The website ConfirmThem.com, however, reported on the same evening that the selection had been made in favor of conservative Fourth Circuit Judge Karen J. Williams. On Monday, October 3, President Bush unexpectedly chose little-known White House Counsel Harriet Miers as O'Connor's replacement.

=== Harriet Miers nomination ===
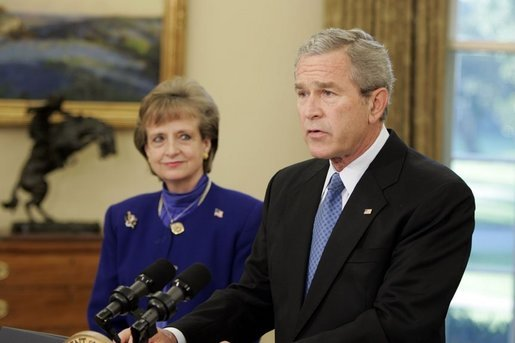
President Bush introducing withdrawn nominee Harriet Miers

There was immediate and intense opposition to Miers’ nomination, primarily from conservative Republicans. Principal complaints included:

- That her credentials under objective standards were not sufficient to qualify her for the position.
- That her nomination was the result of political cronyism. Because her legal career did not compare to those of other possible conservative female candidates (like federal appellate judges Edith Jones, Karen J. Williams, Priscilla Owen, and Janice Rogers Brown), many thought that President Bush probably nominated Miers for her personal loyalty to him rather than for her qualifications.
- That there was no written record to demonstrate that she was either a strict constructionist or originalist in her approach to constitutional interpretation. Some conservatives feared that she would support abortion, affirmative action and gay rights if ever confirmed to a seat on the Supreme Court.

On the morning of Thursday, October 27, 2005, President Bush "reluctantly" accepted Miers’ request to withdraw her nomination.

=== Samuel Alito nomination ===
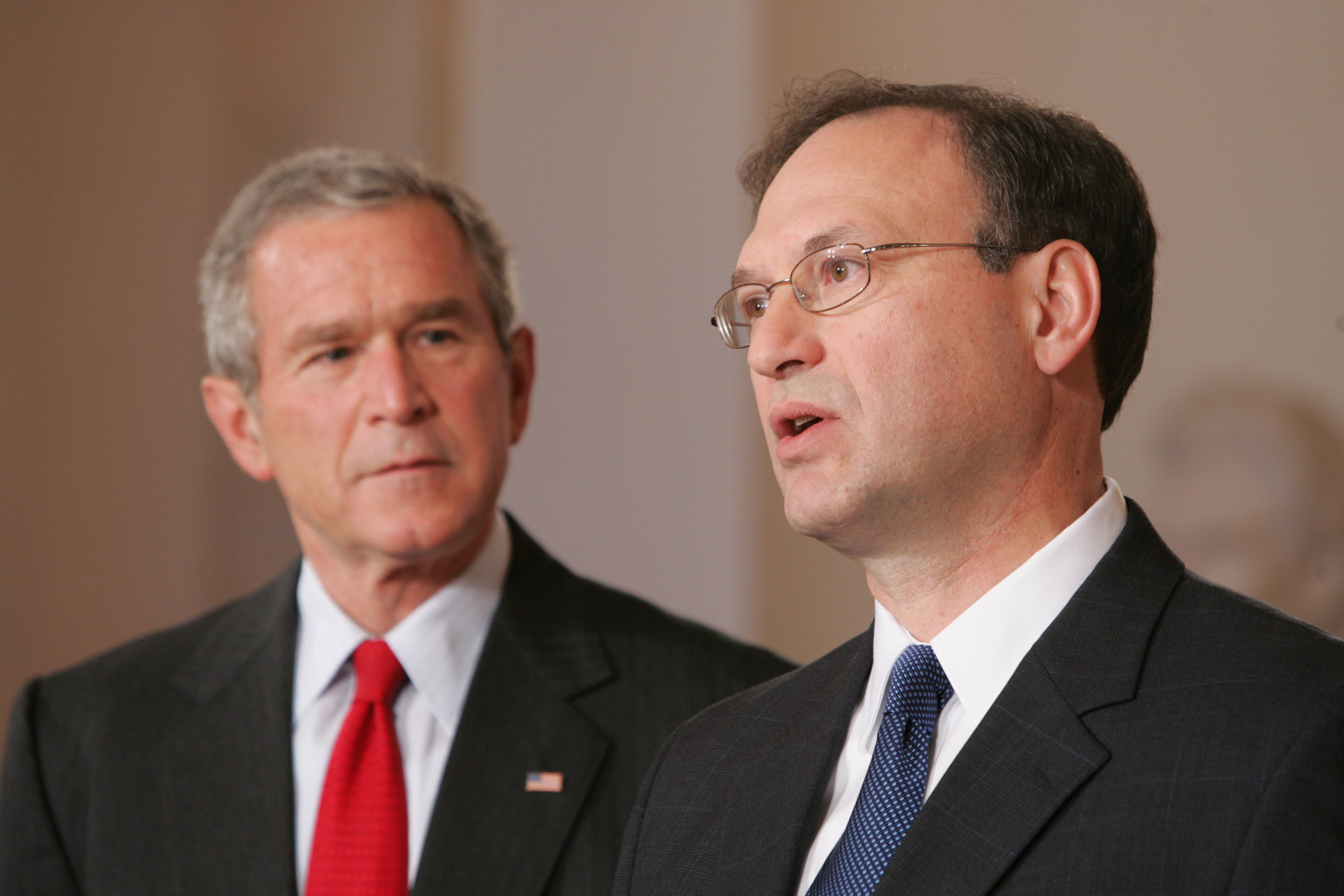
Associate Justice Samuel Alito acknowledges his nomination on October 31, 2005, with President Bush looking on.

Bush moved quickly to find an alternative nominee to Miers, a nominee who would have both the credentials that Miers lacked and a conservative judicial philosophy that could be well documented. On the morning of Monday, October 31, Bush announced the nomination of well-known conservative Judge Samuel A. Alito Jr., a fifteen-year veteran of the Third Circuit Court of Appeals.

Alito's confirmation hearing was held from Monday, January 9, 2006, to Friday, January 13. On Tuesday, January 24, his nomination was voted out of the Senate Judiciary Committee on a 10—8 party line vote. Debate on the nomination began in the full Senate on Wednesday, January 25. Despite a last minute effort by Democratic Senator John Kerry to filibuster, which was joined by, among others, Sens. Barack Obama, Joseph Biden, Hillary Clinton, Charles Schumer, and Harry Reid, a cloture vote to end debate passed 72–25 on Monday, January 30. On the morning of Tuesday, January 31, Alito was confirmed to the Supreme Court by a vote of 58–42. Justice Alito was sworn in privately later that same day, and publicly sworn in the following day.

=== Epilogue ===
At the end of the 109th Congress, the Gang of 14 deal expired. On November 7, 2006, the Democrats retook control in the 110th Congress. Starting in January 2007, they possessed a 51–49 majority in the Senate. As the new Senate majority, the Democrats easily blocked several conservative appellate judicial nominees without resorting to the filibuster. Conservative appellate nominees like Peter Keisler, Robert J. Conrad and Steve A. Matthews were blocked in committee and never given a hearing. If a Supreme Court justice had died or chosen to retire during the 110th Congress, it would have been easy for the Democrats to have blocked his proposed replacement in committee, or even by a party-line vote on the Senate floor, if it somehow came to that. As it happened, no Supreme Court justice died or retired during the 110th Congress.

== Names frequently mentioned ==
Following is a list of individuals who were mentioned in various news accounts as the most likely potential nominees for a Supreme Court appointment under Bush:

=== United States courts of appeals ===

- Court of Appeals for the 3rd Circuit
  - Samuel Alito (born 1950) (nominated and confirmed)
- Court of Appeals for the 4th Circuit
  - J. Harvie Wilkinson III (born 1944) – former chief judge
  - Karen J. Williams (1951–2013) – former chief judge
  - J. Michael Luttig (born 1954) – general counsel for The Boeing Company, former Fourth Circuit judge
- Court of Appeals for the 5th Circuit
  - Edith Brown Clement (born 1948)
  - Emilio M. Garza (born 1947)
  - Edith Jones (born 1949) – former chief judge
  - Priscilla R. Owen (born 1954)
  - Edward C. Prado (born 1947)
  - Jerry Edwin Smith (born 1946)
- Court of Appeals for the 6th Circuit
  - Alice M. Batchelder (born 1944) – former chief judge
  - Danny Julian Boggs (born 1944) – former chief judge
- Court of Appeals for the 7th Circuit
  - Frank Easterbrook (born 1948) – former chief judge
  - Diane S. Sykes (born 1957)
  - Ann Claire Williams (born 1949)
- Court of Appeals for the 9th Circuit
  - Consuelo Callahan (born 1950)
- Court of Appeals for the 10th Circuit
  - Michael W. McConnell (born 1955)
  - Deanell Reece Tacha (born 1946) – former chief judge
- Court of Appeals for the 11th Circuit
  - William H. Pryor Jr. (born 1962)
- Court of Appeals for the D.C. Circuit
  - Janice Rogers Brown (born 1949)
  - Brett Kavanaugh (born 1965) (subsequently nominated by Donald Trump and confirmed in 2018)
  - John Roberts (born 1955) (nominated and confirmed)

=== United States district courts ===
- Cecilia Altonaga (born 1962) – judge, U.S. District Court for the Southern District of Florida
- Ricardo Hinojosa (born 1950) – judge, U.S. District Court for the Southern District of Texas
- Loretta Preska (born 1949) – judge, U.S. District Court for the Southern District of New York

=== State supreme courts (current and former) ===
- Raoul G. Cantero III (born 1960) – former Florida Supreme Court justice
- Maura D. Corrigan (born 1948) – former Michigan Supreme Court justice
- Rebecca Love Kourlis (born 1952) – former Colorado Supreme Court justice

=== United States senators ===
- John Cornyn (born 1952) – Republican senator from Texas, former Texas Supreme Court justice
- Mike Crapo (born 1951) – Republican senator from Idaho
- Mike DeWine (born 1947) – Republican senator from Ohio
- Orrin Hatch (1934–2022) – Republican senator from Utah
- Jon Kyl (1942–2026) – Republican senator from Arizona
- Mel Martinez (born 1946) – Republican senator from Florida

=== Executive branch officials ===
- Christopher Cox (born 1952) – former SEC chairman, former U.S. representative from California

=== Supreme Court litigators ===
- Paul Clement (born 1966) – 43rd solicitor general
- Miguel A. Estrada (born 1961) – withdrawn nominee for the D.C. Circuit, former assistant solicitor general
- Peter D. Keisler (born 1960) – former nominee for the D.C. Circuit, former assistant attorney general
- Maureen E. Mahoney (born 1955) – former deputy solicitor general
- Theodore Olson (1940-2024) – former solicitor general

=== Other backgrounds ===
- Viet Dinh (born 1968) – Georgetown University Law Center professor, former assistant attorney general
- Mary Ann Glendon (born 1938) – former U.S. ambassador to the Holy See, Harvard Law School professor, former member of President's Council on Bioethics
- Alberto R. Gonzales (born 1955) – former attorney general, former White House counsel, former Texas Supreme Court justice
- Harriet Miers (born 1945) – former White House counsel (nomination withdrawn)
- Larry D. Thompson (born 1945) – general counsel for PepsiCo, former deputy attorney general

== See also ==
- United States federal judge
- Judicial appointment history for United States federal courts
