= Gang of 14 =

Bipartisan group of US Senators

The Gang of 14 was a bipartisan group of Senators in the 109th United States Congress who successfully, at the time, negotiated a compromise in the spring of 2005 to avoid the deployment of the so-called "nuclear option" by Senate Republican Majority over an organized use of the filibuster by Senate Democrats.

== Background ==
Senate Democrats used the filibuster to prevent the confirmation of ten conservative court candidates nominated by Republican President George W. Bush.

As a result of these ten filibusters, Senate Republican leaders began to threaten to change the existing Senate rules by using the "nuclear option" (sometimes referred to as the "constitutional option"). This change in rules would eliminate filibusters of judicial confirmation votes.

The theory behind the "nuclear option" was that the Senate had the right to determine its own rules and that those rules could be determined on the basis of a simple majority vote. Democrats objected that the Senate Rules themselves said that a two-thirds majority was required to change Senate rules. Republicans countered that the Senate's power to govern itself was founded in the Constitution itself and that internal Senate rules could not constrain that power.

Because of the political split in the Senate at the time (55 Republicans, 44 Democrats and one liberal Independent), if six Senators from each party could reach an agreement, these twelve could both forestall the "nuclear option" and enable cloture on nominees. A cloture vote on the nomination of Priscilla Owen was scheduled for Tuesday, May 24, 2005. Its predicted failure was expected to start the Republicans moving to "nuclear option".

Some Senators in both parties wanted to find an alternative way out and began negotiations with the tacit support of both parties' leadership. In the end, seven Senators from each party agreed to a compromise which stated, in essence, that Democratic filibusters would come to an end in "all but extraordinary circumstances," and the GOP would not use the "nuclear option".

These Senators, dubbed the "Gang of 14", signed an agreement, pertaining to the 109th Congress only. The seven Democrats agreed that they would vote for cloture on some of the current filibustered judicial nominees and any future filibustered nominees (except in "extraordinary circumstances," as defined by each individual Senator). In return, the seven Republicans agreed they would not vote to carry out the "nuclear option". As the Republicans held a five-vote Senate majority (55–45) in the 109th Congress, this agreement meant that there would be 62 votes for cloture in the specified cases, ending those filibusters, and only 48 votes for the "nuclear option", which would be defeated.

Three of the filibustered nominees (Miguel Estrada, Charles W. Pickering, and Carolyn Kuhl) had already withdrawn. In the 109th Congress, five of the remaining seven filibustered nominees (Priscilla Owen, David McKeague, Richard Griffin, William Pryor, and Janice Rogers Brown) were confirmed as a result of the deal brokered by the Gang. In addition, the gang opposed the confirmation of two remaining nominees, Henry Saad and William Myers, leading them to withdraw their nominations.

While thwarting the goals of their respective party leaderships, the group members were hailed as moderates and institutionalists who put aside partisanship to do what was best for the Senate. At the same time, some of the Republican members of the Gang of 14 were denounced by conservatives for their participation in this agreement.

The Gang became active again in July 2005, attempting to advise Bush on the choice of a nominee to replace retiring Supreme Court Justice Sandra Day O'Connor. On November 3, 2005, the group met to discuss the nomination of Samuel Alito to the Court, but came to no conclusions, noting that the hearing process had only just begun in his case. On January 30, 2006, the members of the group unanimously supported a cloture vote on the Alito nomination, providing more than enough votes to prevent a filibuster.

=== Members ===
The Senators listed below served in the 109th Congress. Susan Collins was the last remaining group member in the Senate, but was defeated in the 2026 election.

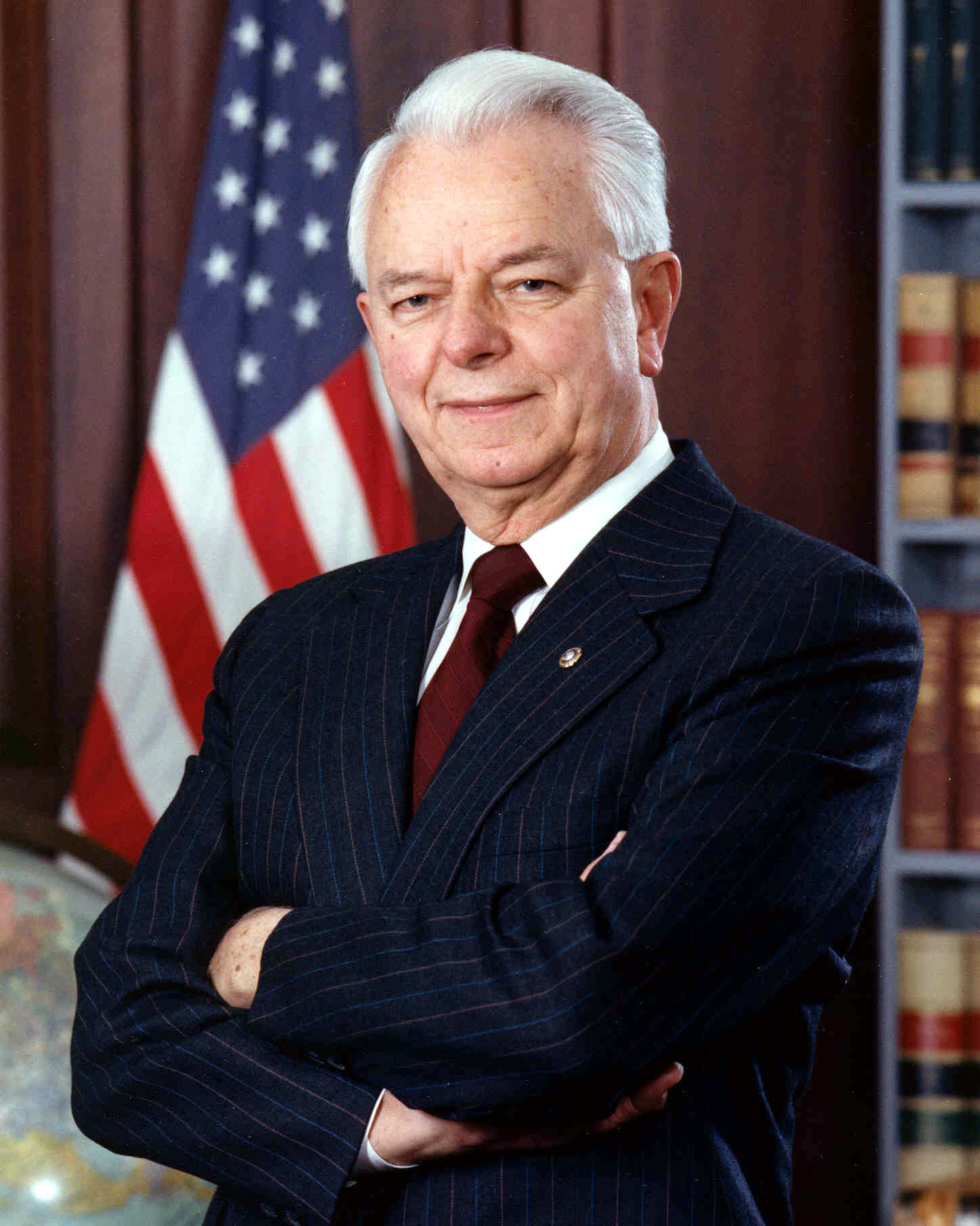
Robert Byrd (D-WV)

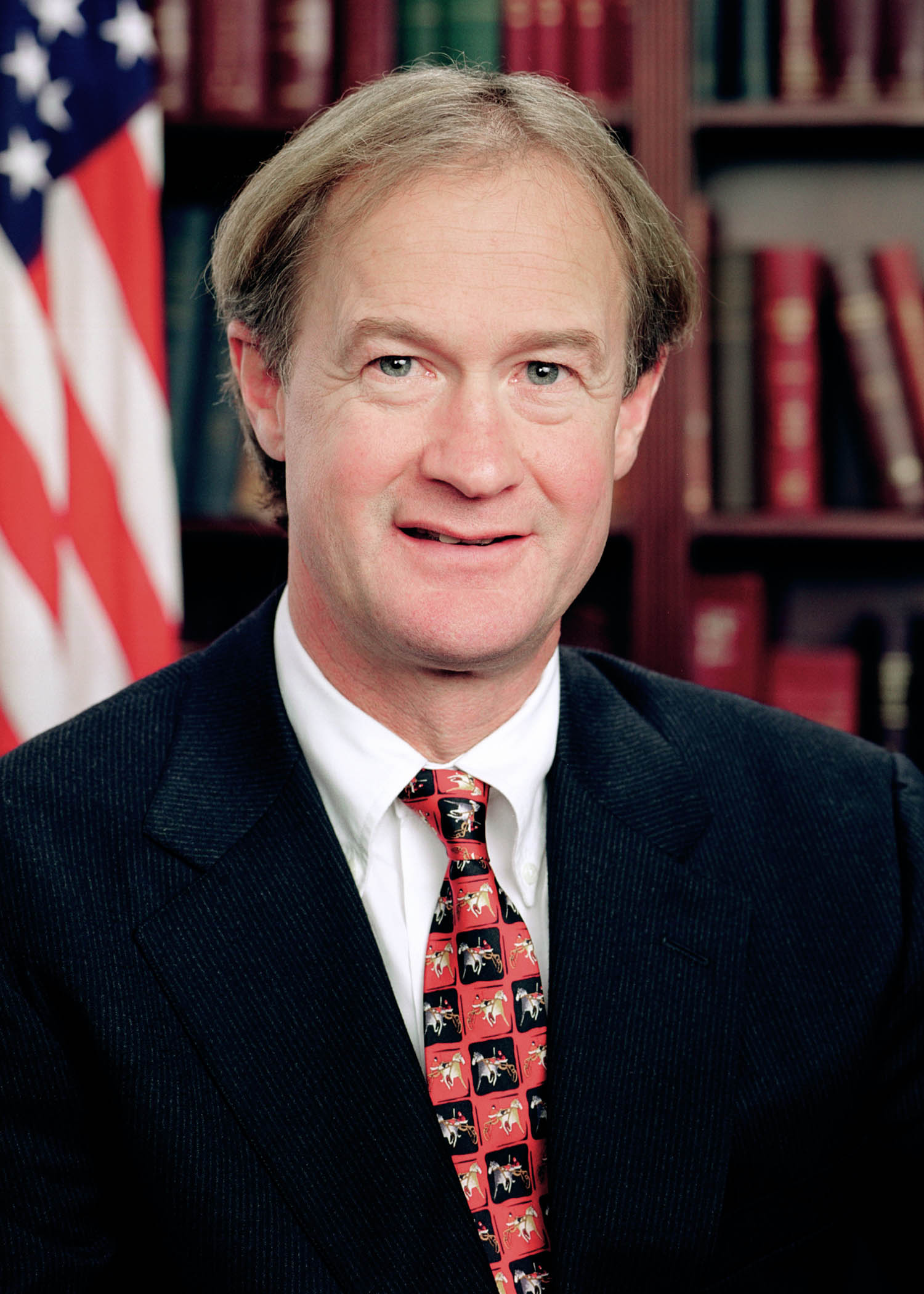
Lincoln Chafee (R-RI)

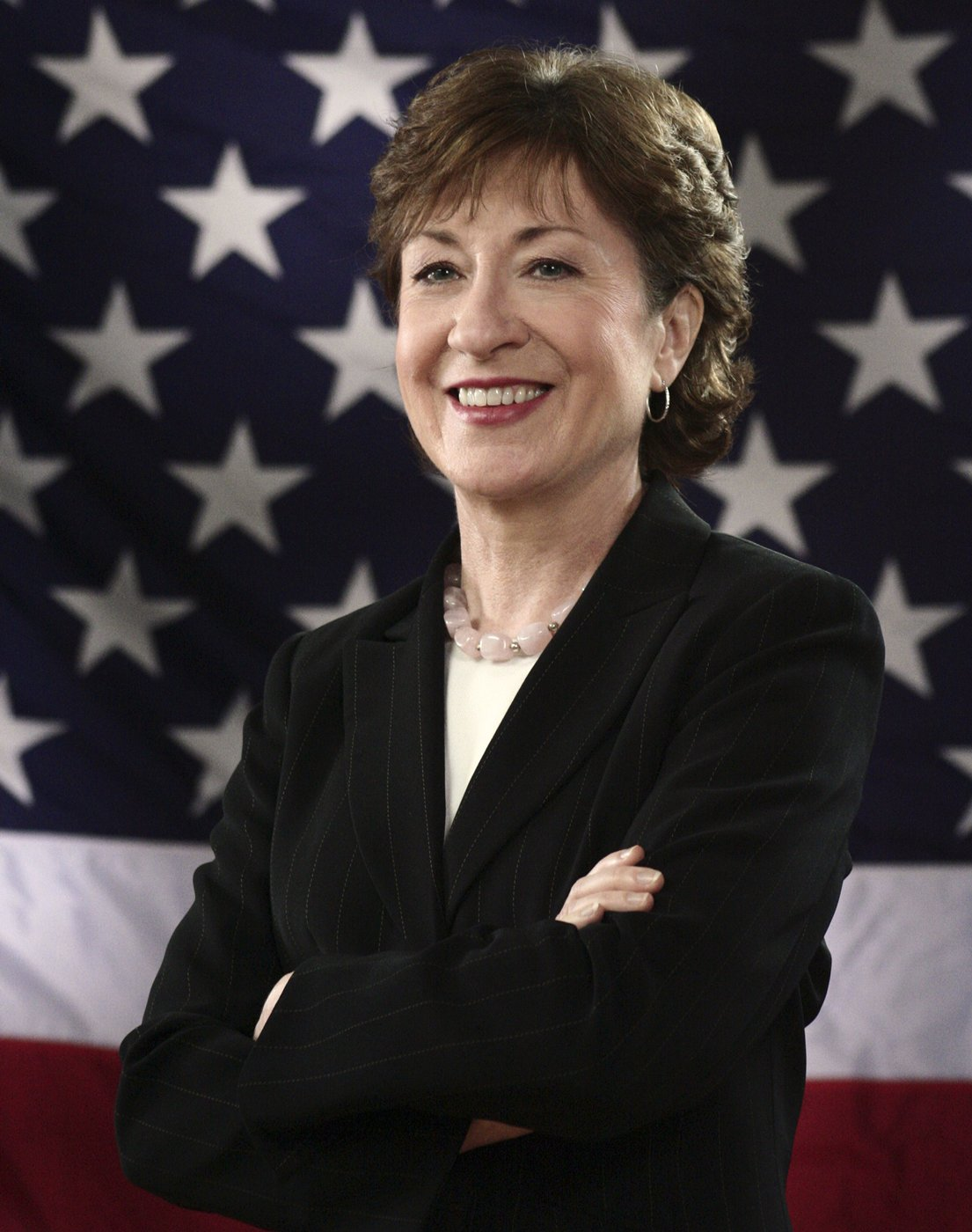
Susan Collins (R-ME)

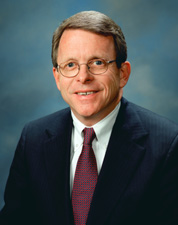
Mike DeWine (R-OH)

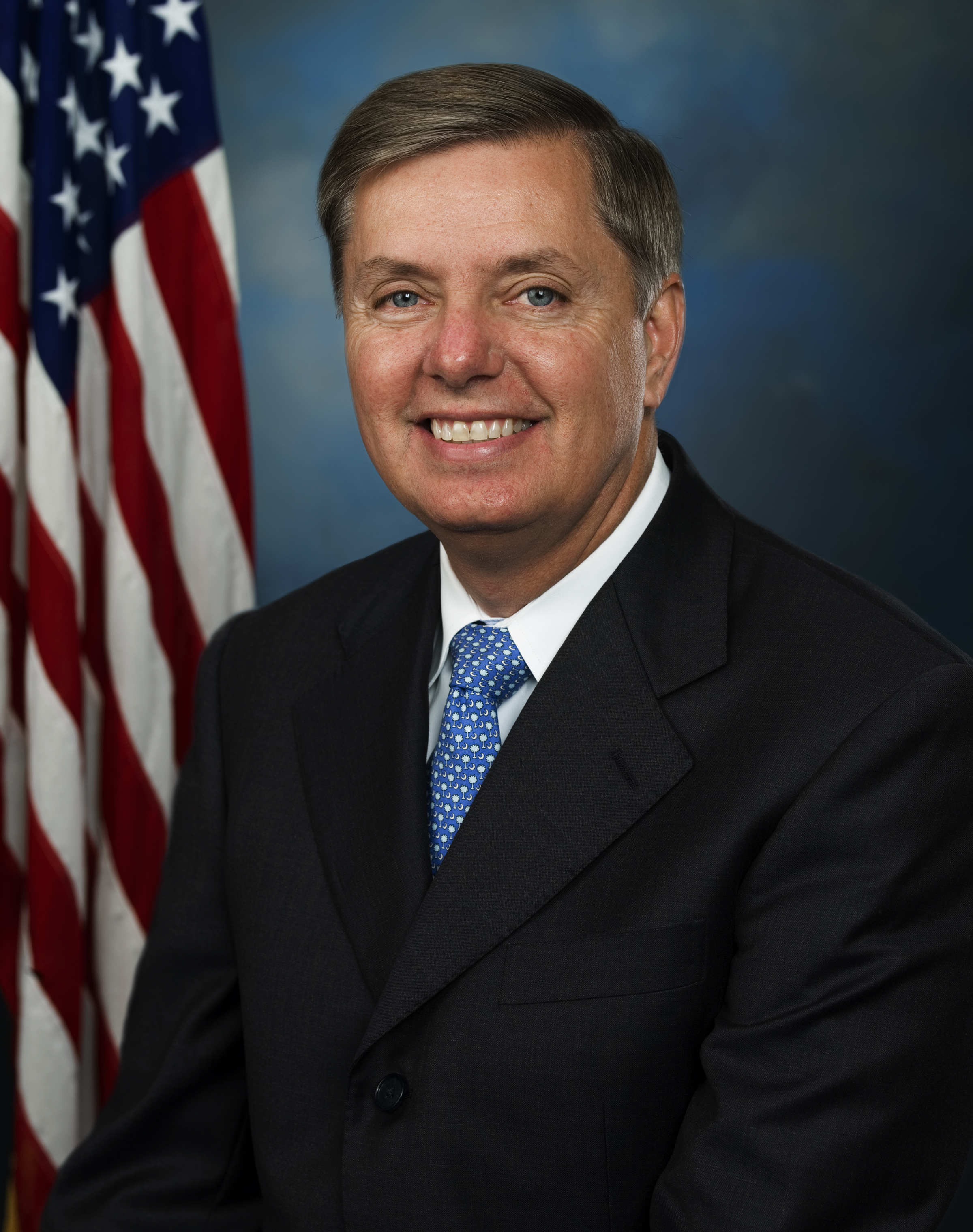
Lindsey Graham (R-SC)

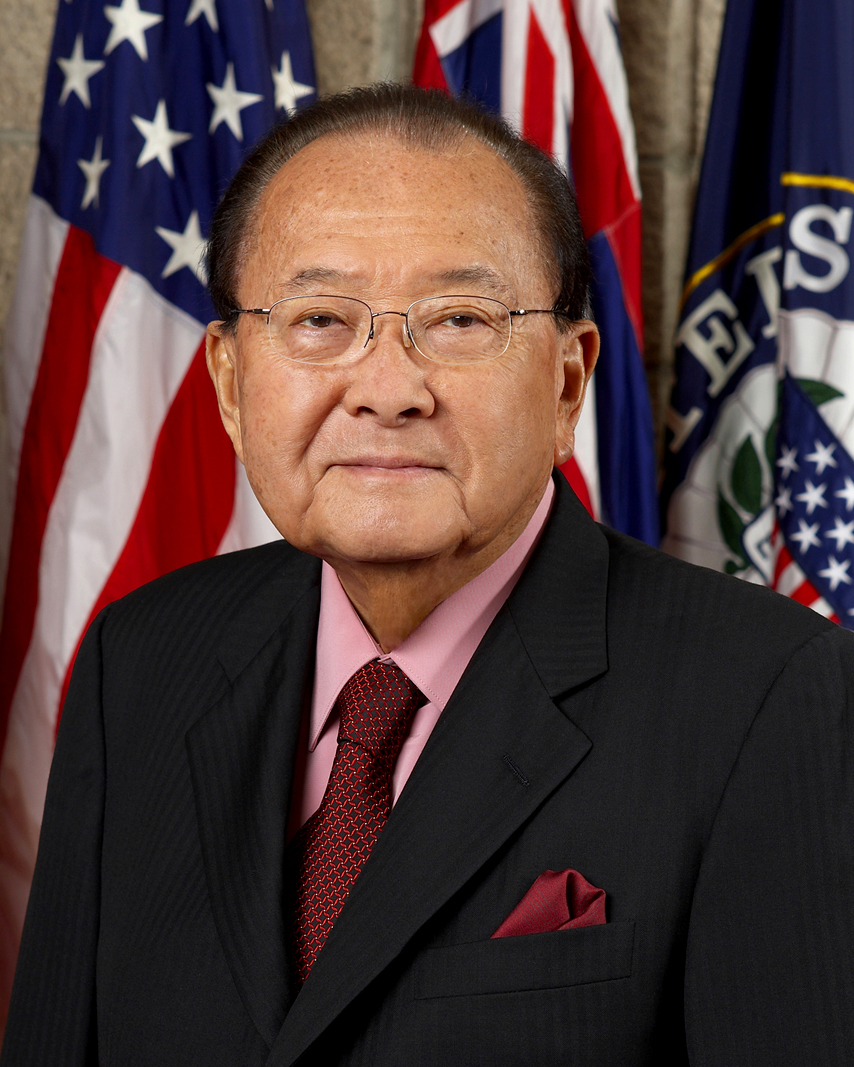
Daniel Inouye (D-HI)

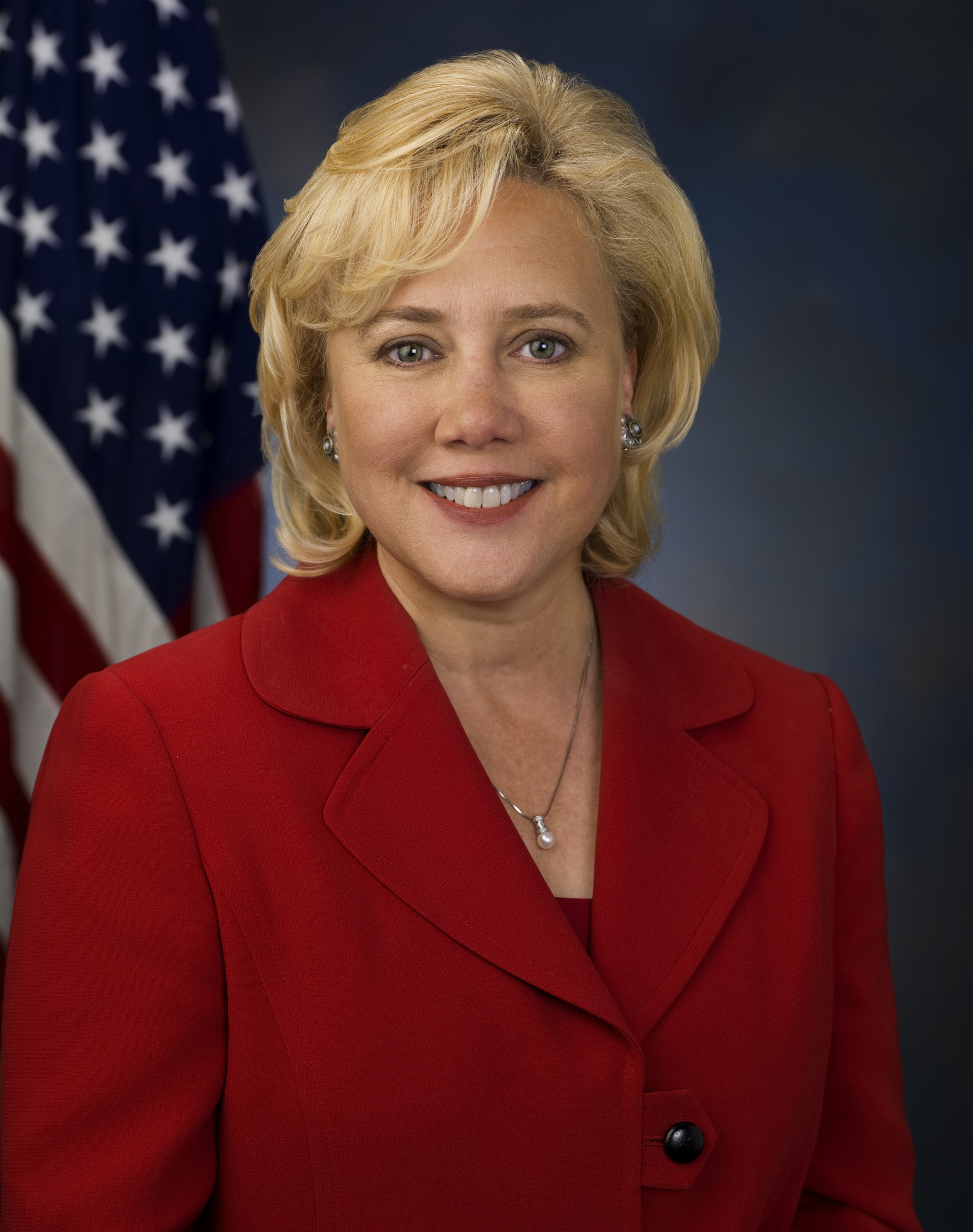
Mary Landrieu (D-LA)

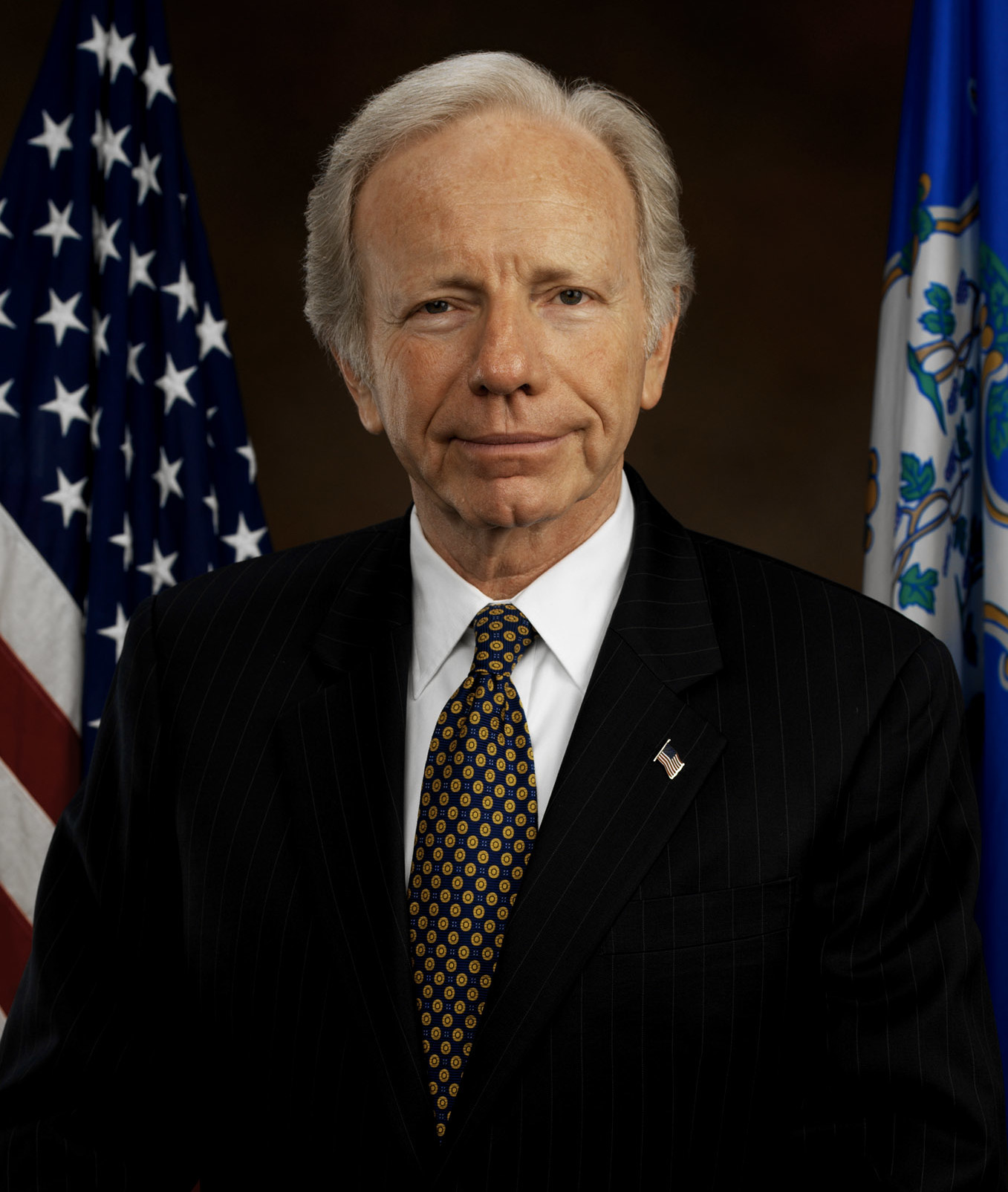
Joe Lieberman (D-CT)

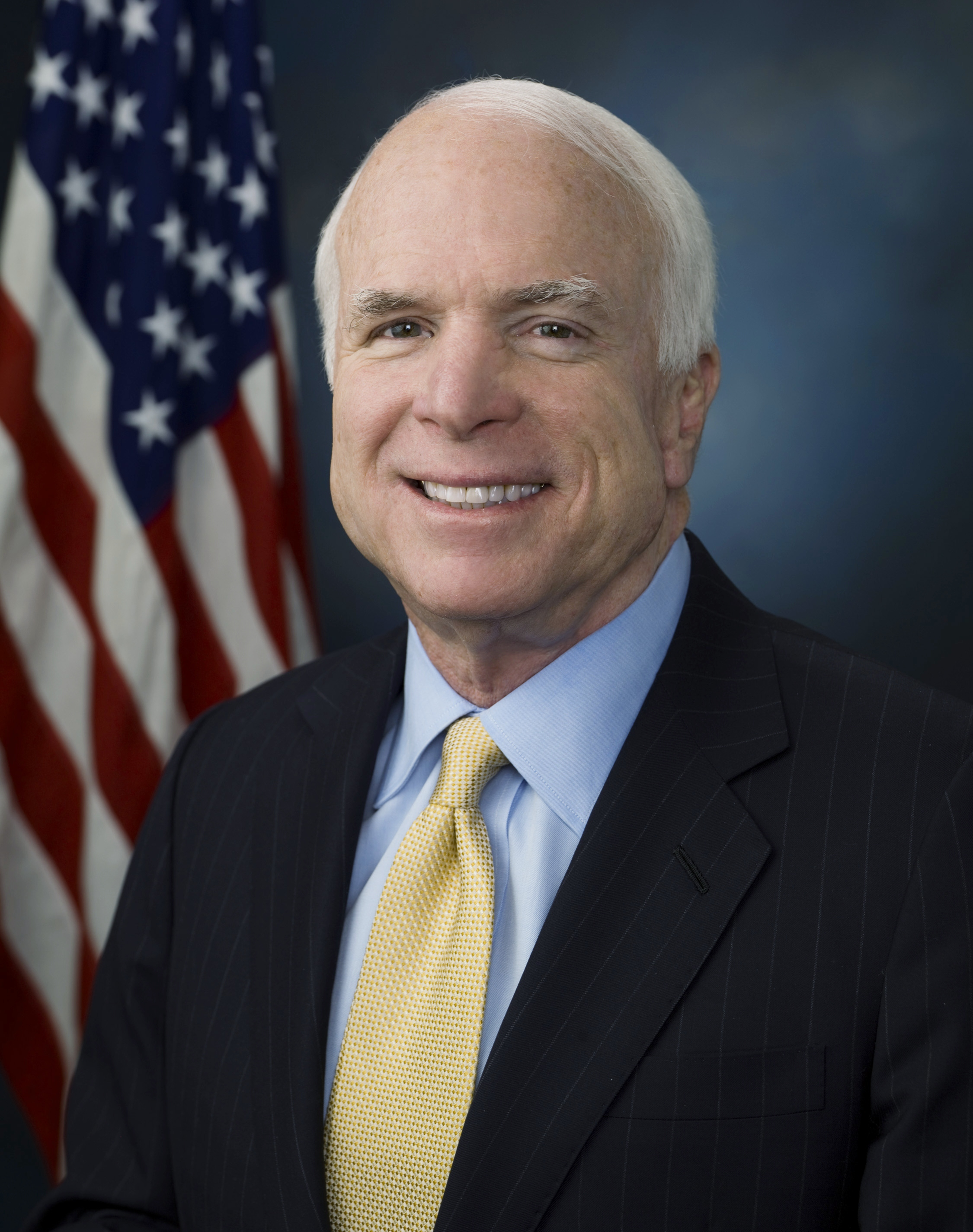
John McCain (R-AZ)

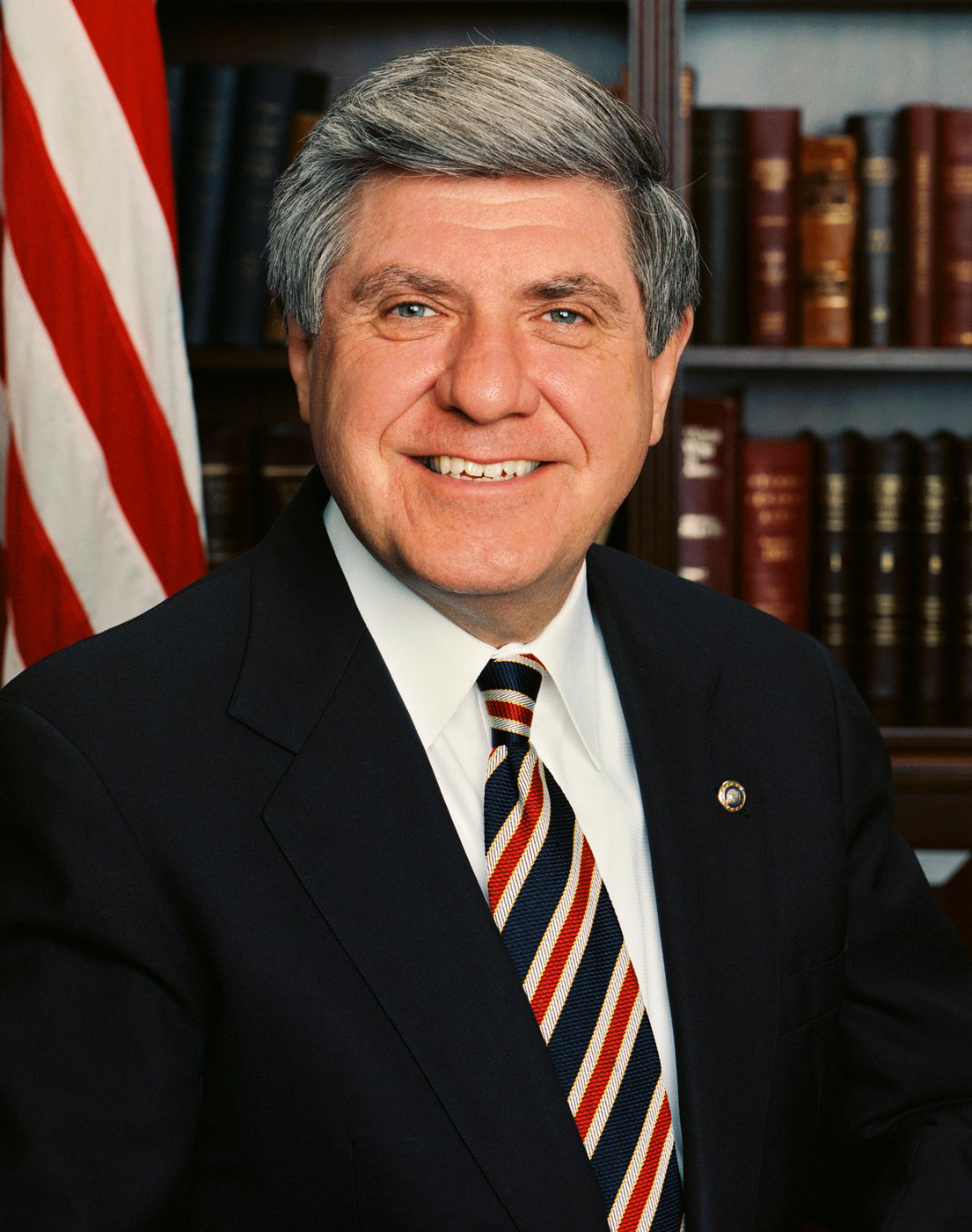
Ben Nelson (D-NE)

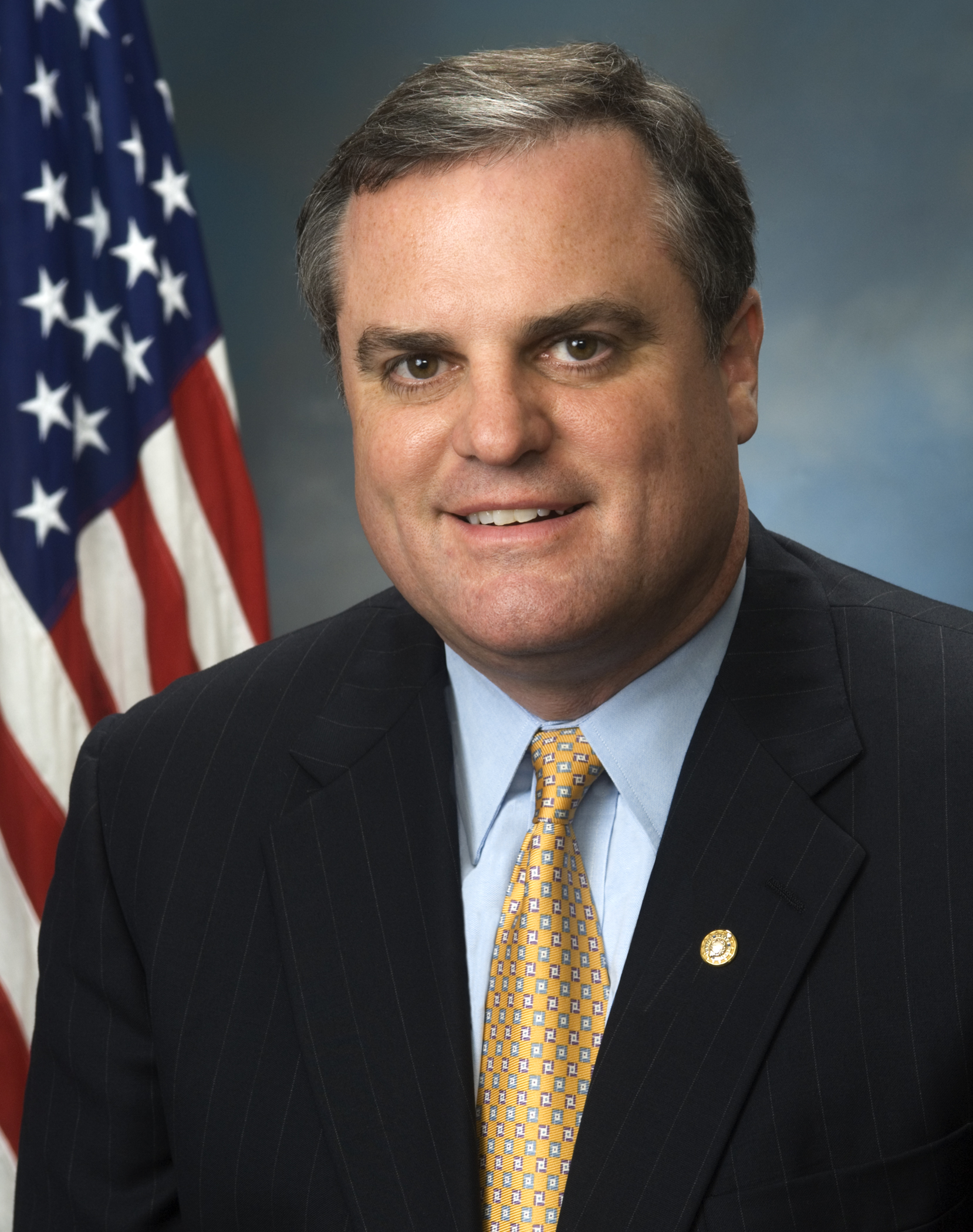
Mark Pryor (D-AR)

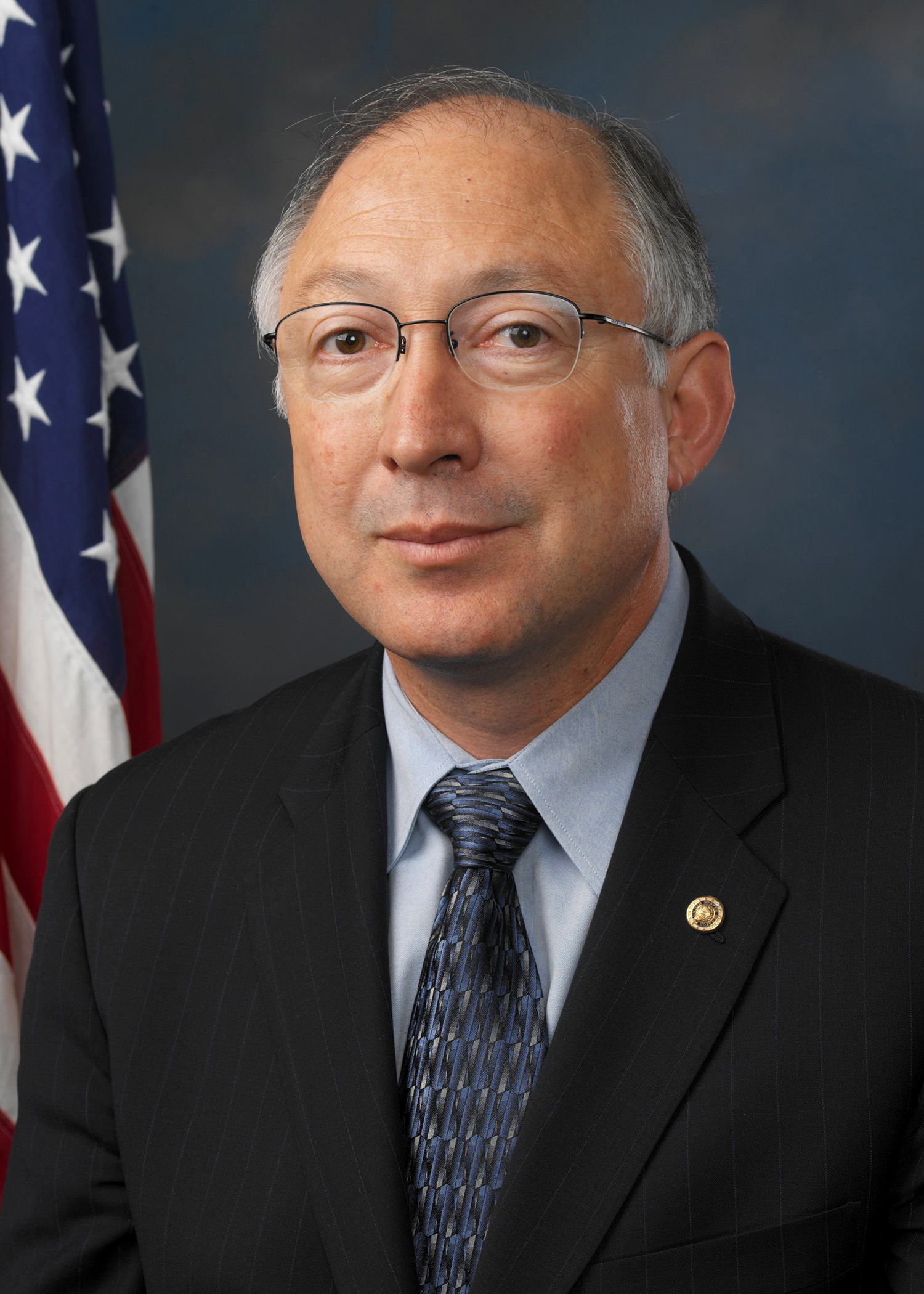
Ken Salazar (D-CO)

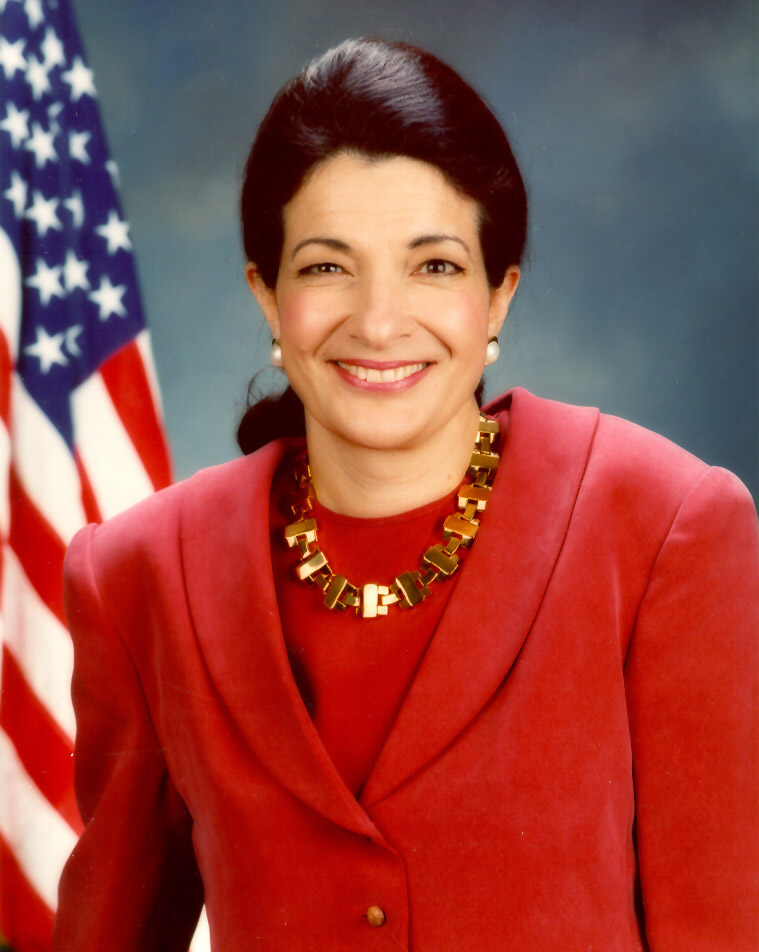
Olympia Snowe (R-ME)

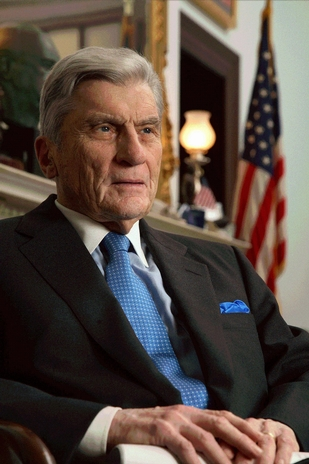
John Warner (R-VA)

=== Text of the agreement ===
MEMORANDUM OF UNDERSTANDING ON JUDICIAL NOMINATIONS

We respect the diligent, conscientious efforts, to date, rendered to the Senate by Majority Leader Frist and Democratic Leader Reid. This memorandum confirms an understanding among the signatories, based upon mutual trust and confidence, related to pending and future judicial nominations in the 109th Congress.

This memorandum is in two parts. Part I relates to the currently pending judicial nominees; Part II relates to subsequent individual nominations to be made by the President and to be acted upon by the Senate's Judiciary Committee.

We have agreed to the following:

Part I: Commitments on Pending Judicial Nominations

A. Votes for Certain Nominees. We will vote to invoke cloture on the following judicial nominees: Janice Rogers Brown (D.C. Circuit), William Pryor (11th Circuit), and Priscilla Owen (5th Circuit).

B. Status of Other Nominees. Signatories make no commitment to vote for or against cloture on the following judicial nominees: William Myers (9th Circuit) and Henry Saad (6th Circuit).

Part II: Commitments for Future Nominations

A. Future Nominations. Signatories will exercise their responsibilities under the Advice and Consent Clause of the United States Constitution in good faith. Nominees should be filibustered only under extraordinary circumstances, and each signatory must use his or her own discretion and judgment in determining whether such circumstances exist.

B. Rules Changes. In light of the spirit and continuing commitments made in this agreement, we commit to oppose the rules changes in the 109th Congress, which we understand to be any amendment to or interpretation of the Rules of the Senate that would force a vote on a judicial nomination by means other than unanimous consent or Rule XXII.

We believe that, under Article II, Section 2, of the United States Constitution, the word "Advice" speaks to consultation between the Senate and the President with regard to the use of the President's power to make nominations. We encourage the Executive branch of government to consult with members of the Senate, both Democratic and Republican, prior to submitting a judicial nomination to the Senate for consideration.

Such a return to the early practices of our government may well serve to reduce the rancor that unfortunately accompanies the advice and consent process in the Senate.

We firmly believe this agreement is consistent with the traditions of the United States Senate that we as Senators seek to uphold.

== Initial results ==
As a result of the agreement, Priscilla Owen was confirmed 55-43, Janice Rogers Brown was confirmed 56-43, and William Pryor was confirmed 53-45. The two nominees who were not specifically guaranteed cloture in the agreement, William Myers and Henry Saad, both later withdrew. Myers of Idaho was opposed by the Democratic leadership because of the perceived anti-environmental bias of his work as solicitor general of the Department of the Interior and deputy general counsel of the Department of Energy. Saad of Michigan, on the other hand, was opposed by his two Democratic home state Senators, Carl Levin and Debbie Stabenow, because he had angered Stabenow in September 2003 by sending out an e-mail critical of her participation in his original filibuster. In the e-mail, Saad wrote to a supporter about Stabenow, "This is the game they play. Pretend to do the right thing while abusing the system and undermining the constitutional process. Perhaps some day she will pay the price for her misconduct." Stabenow became aware of the e-mail when Saad accidentally sent it not only to the supporter but also to Stabenow's office.

The immediate and proximate political result of the agreement was the curtailing of Democratic filibusters and the short-term end to the "nuclear option" debate. Three judicial nominees not explicitly mentioned in the original Gang deal were confirmed under its provisions: David McKeague, Richard Allen Griffin and Thomas B. Griffith.

Sen. Orrin Hatch at the time characterized the deal as "a truce, not a ceasefire", and the potential for a resumption of hostilities was obvious to everyone. The compromise purported to rule out Democratic filibusters in "all but extraordinary circumstances", yet the day after the compromise was announced, Harry Reid provocatively announced in a speech on the Senate floor that in his view, the Democrats were already using the filibuster in only "extraordinary circumstances". Sen. Carl Levin made a provocative attempt to shut the door on the "nuclear option" by obtaining a ruling from the Senate chair (at that moment, Senator John E. Sununu (R-NH)) that the filibuster had been yielded as constitutional by the compromise, which failed.

The compromise was further tested by the confirmation battle over the nomination of Samuel Alito to the Supreme Court to fill the vacancy left by Sandra Day O'Connor's retirement. Some Democratic Senators attempted a filibuster; however, the entire Gang of 14 voted for cloture, which passed by 72 to 24 (with 60 "aye" votes needed). Several members of the Gang of 14 then voted against confirming Alito, including Republican Lincoln Chafee.

== Filibuster revisited in the 109th Congress ==
In April 2006, Senate Republicans began pushing for the confirmation of two controversial conservative Court of Appeals nominees who had not been included in the Gang of 14 deal of 2005: district court judge Terrence Boyle and White House aide Brett Kavanaugh. Boyle had been first nominated to the Fourth Circuit in 2001 and Kavanaugh to the D.C. Circuit in 2003. Reid had then expressed concern over both nominees, threatening a possible filibuster of each one. On May 3, 2006, the seven Democratic members of the Gang of 14 wrote a letter to the Senate Judiciary Committee, requesting a second hearing for Kavanaugh. That request was granted the next day. On May 9, Kavanaugh appeared before the Senate Judiciary Committee for his second hearing. Later that same day, the Gang of 14 met to discuss his nomination as well as the nomination of Boyle which had become embroiled in a debate concerning Boyle's failure to recuse himself in several cases. After the meeting, South Carolina Senator Lindsey Graham declared that he saw no "extraordinary circumstances" concerning Kavanaugh's nomination. However, several Republican members of the "Gang" refused to address the status of Boyle. The Democratic members said they would request a second hearing for Boyle as they had done earlier for Kavanaugh. On Thursday, May 11, Kavanaugh was voted out of committee on a party line vote of 10–8 Two weeks later, on May 25, cloture was invoked on Kavanaugh by a vote of 67–30 with all but two members of the Gang of 14 voting to end debate. Senator Inouye voted against invoking cloture, and Senator Salazar did not vote. The next day, Kavanaugh was confirmed to the D.C. Circuit by a vote of 57–36. All of the Republicans and three of the Democrats (Byrd, Landrieu, and Nelson) in the Gang voted for confirmation.

Before the Boyle nomination could be addressed, a controversy arose about the nomination of William Haynes, the general counsel of the Department of Defense, to be an appellate judge on the Fourth Circuit. When it was revealed that Republican senator Graham might be holding up Haynes's nomination in committee due to concerns about Haynes' participation in the formulation and implementation of certain torture guidelines suggested by the Bybee memo, conservative leaders pressured Graham to get Haynes confirmed. Graham responded to his critics with a letter explaining his position on the nomination. Eventually, Haynes was granted a second hearing as Kavanaugh had been before him. Two days after the July 11 hearing, the Gang met to discuss Haynes' nomination. Their initial response did not seem positive.

Before any further action could be taken on Haynes, however, his nomination (as well as those of four other controversial appellate nominees including Boyle and previously filibustered nominee William Myers) was returned to the White House according to Senate rules on August 3, 2006, in advance of the annual August recess of Congress. When the Senate returned in September, it was only for a short period before a break for the 2006 midterm election. Although Boyle, Myers and Haynes were renominated, again no action was taken on them in the Senate Judiciary Committee before the break, and their nominations were sent back a second time to the White House on September 29.

== Impact on the 2006 elections ==
The compromise was successful in precluding further judicial filibusters or the use of the nuclear option during the rest of the 109th Congress. As noted before, the Gang of 14 deal was instrumental in getting Supreme Court nominee Samuel Alito an up-or-down vote, as the votes for confirmation (58 for to 42 against) would not have been enough for cloture.

In the 2006 elections, however, Democratic challengers attacked incumbent Republicans for support of Bush's judicial nominees. In the November 7, 2006, elections, the Democrats gained six additional Senate seats, giving them control in the incoming 110th Congress. Republican "Gang" members Lincoln Chafee of Rhode Island and Mike DeWine of Ohio were replaced by Democrats Sheldon Whitehouse and Sherrod Brown, respectively.

After the elections, President Bush resubmitted the six nominations sent back to him in September. However, Judiciary Committee chairman Senator Arlen Specter said that the Committee would not act on these nominees during the lame duck session of the 109th Congress.

== Epilogue ==
In the 110th Congress, the Democrats had a 51–49 majority in the Senate, and no longer needed to filibuster nominees. Thus the purpose of the Gang of 14 disappeared. President Bush attempted to reconcile with the Senate Democrats by not renominating Boyle, Myers, and Haynes in January 2007. As the new majority party, the Senate Democrats easily blocked several conservative appellate judicial nominees during the 110th Congress by ordinary methods. Conservative appellate nominees like Peter Keisler, Robert J. Conrad and Steve A. Matthews were blocked in committee and never given a hearing, while 10 other nominees were confirmed, usually with unanimous support.

On November 17, 2009, two members of the Gang of 14 – Senators McCain (R-AZ) and Graham (R-SC) – voted against the motion to invoke cloture on the nomination of U.S. District Judge David Hamilton, President Obama's pick for a vacant seat on the Seventh Circuit. At the time, neither Senator linked his vote to the "extraordinary circumstances" standard announced in the Gang's original agreement. Senator Graham indicated that he thought that Judge Hamilton's views were "so far removed from the mainstream" that a vote against cloture was warranted.

== End of judicial filibusters ==
Though Democrats were a majority in the Senate after 2006, Republicans blocked several Appellate Court nominees of President Barack Obama by use of the filibuster. On November 21, 2013, at the direction of leader Harry Reid, Senate Democrats used the "nuclear option" to revise Senate rules and eliminate filibusters of Presidential nominees, leaving the possibility of filibusters of nominees for the Supreme Court intact. The vote was 52 to 48 – all Republicans and three Democrats Carl Levin (D-MI), Joe Manchin (D-WV), and Mark Pryor (D-AR) voting against.

After Republicans regained control of the Senate, McCain voted in favor of the nuclear option in order to get Neil Gorsuch confirmed to the Supreme Court. Today, judicial nominations can no longer be filibustered, although the legislative filibuster still exists.

== See also ==
- United States federal judge
- Judicial appointment history for United States federal courts
- Standing Rules of the United States Senate, Rule XXII
- George W. Bush judicial appointment controversies
- George W. Bush Supreme Court candidates
