= George W. Bush judicial appointment controversies =

During President George W. Bush's two term tenure in office, a few of his nominations for federal judgeships were blocked by the Senate Democrats either directly in the Senate Judiciary Committee or on the full Senate floor in various procedural moves, including the first use of a filibuster to block a Federal Appeals Court nominee. Republicans labeled it an unwarranted obstruction of professionally qualified judicial nominees.

== List of unsuccessful federal judicial nominations ==
Bush made 53 nominations for federal judgeships that were not confirmed by the Senate. Of these, 14 were withdrawn by Bush, while the other 39 expired at an adjournment of the Senate, including 30 that expired at the close of the 110th Congress. As of October 16, 2019, 12 of his unsuccessful nominees had been nominated to federal judgeships by subsequent presidents, with 10 of them having been confirmed.

Nominee	Court	Nomination date	Date of final action	Final action	Subsequent federal judicial nominations	Seat filled by	Ref.
Supreme Court
John Roberts	SCOTUS	July 29, 2005	September 6, 2005	withdrawn by Pres. Bush	Chief Justice (nominated September 6, 2005, confirmed September 29, 2005)	Samuel Alito	
Harriet Miers	SCOTUS	October 7, 2005	October 28, 2005	withdrawn by Pres. Bush		Samuel Alito	
Courts of appeals
Terrence Boyle	4th Cir.	May 9, 2001	December 9, 2006	returned to the president		James A. Wynn Jr.	
Miguel Estrada	D.C. Cir.	May 9, 2001	September 4, 2003	withdrawn by Pres. Bush		Thomas B. Griffith	
Charles W. Pickering (Note: Received a recess appointment on January 16, 2004.)	5th Cir.	May 25, 2001	December 8, 2004	returned to the president		Leslie H. Southwick	
Carolyn Kuhl	9th Cir.	June 22, 2001	December 8, 2004	returned to the president		Sandra Segal Ikuta	
William H. Steele	11th Cir.	October 9, 2001	November 20, 2002	returned to the president	N.D. Ala. (nominated January 7, 2003, confirmed March 13, 2003)	William H. Pryor Jr.	
Henry Saad	6th Cir.	November 8, 2001	March 27, 2006	withdrawn by Pres. Bush		Raymond Kethledge	
Claude Allen	4th Cir.	April 28, 2003	December 8, 2004	returned to the president		Andre M. Davis	
William Myers	9th Cir.	May 15, 2003	December 9, 2006	returned to the president		N. Randy Smith	
James H. Payne	10th Cir.	September 29, 2005	March 7, 2006	withdrawn by Pres. Bush		Jerome Holmes	
William J. Haynes II	4th Cir.	September 29, 2003	December 9, 2006	returned to the president		Barbara Milano Keenan	
Michael Wallace	5th Cir.	February 8, 2006	December 9, 2006	returned to the president		Leslie H. Southwick	
Stephen Murphy III	6th Cir.	June 28, 2006	April 15, 2008	withdrawn by Pres. Bush	E.D. Mich. (nominated April 15, 2008, confirmed June 24, 2008)	Helene White	
Peter Keisler	D.C. Cir.	June 29, 2006	January 2, 2009	returned to the president		Patricia Millett	
Robert J. Conrad	4th Cir.	July 17, 2007	January 2, 2009	returned to the president		James A. Wynn Jr.	
Shalom D. Stone	3rd Cir.	July 17, 2007	January 2, 2009	returned to the president		Joseph A. Greenaway Jr.	
E. Duncan Getchell	4th Cir.	September 6, 2007	January 23, 2008	withdrawn by Pres. Bush		Barbara Milano Keenan	
Steve A. Matthews	4th Cir.	September 6, 2007	January 2, 2009	returned to the president		Albert Diaz	
Rod Rosenstein	4th Cir.	November 15, 2007	January 2, 2009	returned to the president		Andre M. Davis	
Gene E. K. Pratter	3rd Cir.	November 15, 2007	July 24, 2008	withdrawn by Pres. Bush		Thomas I. Vanaskie	
William E. Smith	1st Cir.	December 6, 2007	January 2, 2009	returned to the president		O. Rogeriee Thompson	
Glen E. Conrad	4th Cir.	May 8, 2008	January 2, 2009	returned to the president		Barbara Milano Keenan	
Paul S. Diamond	3rd Cir.	July 24, 2008	January 2, 2009	returned to the president		Thomas I. Vanaskie	
Loretta Preska	2nd Cir.	September 9, 2008	January 2, 2009	returned to the president		Gerard E. Lynch	
Philip P. Simon	7th Cir.	September 26, 2008	January 2, 2009	returned to the president		David Hamilton	
District courts
Frederick W. Rohlfing III	D. Haw.	January 23, 2002	May 6, 2004	withdrawn by Pres. Bush		John Michael Seabright	
Daniel P. Ryan	E.D. Mich.	April 28, 2003	March 30, 2006	withdrawn by Pres. Bush		Stephen Murphy III	
Jerome Holmes	N.D. Okla.	February 14, 2006	May 4, 2006	withdrawn by Pres. Bush	10th Cir. (nominated May 4, 2006, confirmed July 25, 2006)	Gregory Kent Frizzell	
Leslie H. Southwick	S.D. Miss.	June 6, 2006	December 9, 2006	returned to the president	5th Cir. (nominated January 9, 2007, confirmed October 24, 2007)	Carlton W. Reeves	
Mary Donohue	N.D.N.Y.	June 28, 2006	September 6, 2007	withdrawn by Pres. Bush		Mae D'Agostino	
James E. Rogan	C.D. Cal.	November 15, 2006	January 2, 2009	returned to the president		Jacqueline Nguyen	
Thomas Farr	E.D.N.C.	December 7, 2006	January 2, 2009	returned to the president	E.D.N.C. (nominated July 13, 2017, returned January 3, 2019)	Richard E. Myers II	
David R. Dugas	M.D. La.	March 19, 2007	January 2, 2009	returned to the president		Brian A. Jackson	
Richard H. Honaker	D. Wyo.	March 19, 2007	January 2, 2009	returned to the president		Nancy D. Freudenthal	
William J. Powell	N.D. W. Va.	May 24, 2007	January 2, 2009	returned to the president		Gina M. Groh	
Gus A. Puryear IV	M.D. Tenn.	June 13, 2007	January 2, 2009	returned to the president		Kevin H. Sharp	
Lincoln D. Almond	D.R.I.	November 15, 2007	January 2, 2009	returned to the president		John J. McConnell Jr.	
David J. Novak	E.D. Va.	November 15, 2007	January 2, 2009	returned to the president	E.D. Va. (nominated March 26, 2019, confirmed October 16, 2019)	John A. Gibney Jr.	
Carolyn P. Short	E.D. Pa.	November 15, 2007	January 2, 2009	returned to the president		vacancy nullified	
Colm Connolly	D. Del.	February 26, 2008	January 2, 2009	returned to the president	D. Del. (nominated December 20, 2017, confirmed August 1, 2018)	Leonard P. Stark	
Michael O'Neill	D.D.C.	June 19, 2008	January 2, 2009	returned to the president		Amy Berman Jackson	
Jeffrey A. Rosen	D.D.C.	June 19, 2008	January 2, 2009	returned to the president		James E. Boasberg	
Gregory E. Goldberg	D. Colo.	July 10, 2008	January 2, 2009	returned to the president		R. Brooke Jackson	
William F. Jung	M.D. Fla.	July 10, 2008	January 2, 2009	returned to the president	M.D. Fla. (nominated April 28, 2017, returned January 3, 2017); M.D. Fla. (nominated December 21, 2017, confirmed September 6, 2018)	Charlene Edwards Honeywell	
Timothy Dugan	E.D. Wis.	July 15, 2008	January 2, 2009	returned to the president		vacancy rescinded	
Marco A. Hernandez	D. Ore.	July 23, 2008	January 2, 2009	returned to the president	D. Ore. (nominated July 14, 2010, confirmed February 7, 2011)	Himself	
John Tharp	N.D. Ill.	July 31, 2008	January 2, 2009	returned to the president	N.D. Ill. (nominated November 10, 2011, confirmed May 14, 2012)	Sharon Johnson Coleman	
J. Richard Barry	S.D. Miss.	July 31, 2008	January 2, 2009	returned to the president		Carlton W. Reeves	
Thomas Marcelle	N.D.N.Y.	July 31, 2008	January 2, 2009	returned to the president	N.D.N.Y. (nominated November 13, 2018, withdrawn September 19, 2019)	Mae D'Agostino	
J. Mac Davis	W.D. Wis.	September 9, 2008	January 2, 2009	returned to the president		James D. Peterson	
Article I courts
Francis L. Cramer III	T.C.	November 28, 2001	June 28, 2002	withdrawn by Pres. Bush		Mark V. Holmes	
Glen L. Bower	T.C.	September 12, 2002	March 22, 2004	withdrawn by Pres. Bush		Richard T. Morrison	

== 107th Congress ==
Yale law professor Bruce Ackerman argued in a February 2001 edition of the magazine The American Prospect that Bush should not be permitted to place nominees on the Supreme Court during his first term due to the Supreme Court's decision in Bush v. Gore. In addition, law professors Cass Sunstein (University of Chicago) and Laurence Tribe (Harvard), along with Marcia Greenberger of the National Women's Law Center, counseled Senate Democrats in April 2001 "to scrutinize judicial nominees more closely than ever." Specifically, they said, "there was no obligation to confirm someone just because they are scholarly or erudite."

In March 2001, the Bush administration stopped relying on the American Bar Association (ABA) for the screening process for qualified judicial candidates. The administration justified the move by saying the ABA was liberal.

On May 9, 2001, President Bush announced his first eleven court of appeals nominees in a special White House ceremony. This initial group of nominees included Roger Gregory, a Clinton recess-appointed judge to the Fourth Circuit, as a peace offering to Senate Democrats. There was, however, immediate concern expressed by Senate Democrats and liberal groups like the Alliance for Justice. Democratic Senator Charles E. Schumer of New York said that the White House was "trying to create the most ideological bench in the history of the nation."

== 108th Congress ==
During the 108th Congress in which the Republicans regained control of the Senate by a 51–49 margin, the nominees that the Senate Democrats had blocked in the 107th Congress began to be moved through the now Republican Senate Judiciary Committee. Subsequently, Senate Democrats started to filibuster judicial nominees. On February 12, 2003, Miguel Estrada, a nominee for the D.C. Circuit, became the first court of appeals nominee ever to be successfully filibustered. Later, nine other conservative court of appeals nominees were also filibustered. These nine were Priscilla Owen, Charles W. Pickering, Carolyn Kuhl, David McKeague, Henry Saad, Richard Allen Griffin, William H. Pryor, William Gerry Myers III and Janice Rogers Brown. Three of the nominees (Estrada, Pickering and Kuhl) withdrew their nominations before the end of the 108th Congress. Bush nominee Sandra Segal Ikuta would later be appointed to the seat Kuhl was nominated for.

As a result of these ten filibusters, Senate Republicans began to threaten to change the existing Senate rules by using what Senator Trent Lott termed the "nuclear option". This change in rules would eliminate the use of the filibuster to prevent judicial confirmation votes. However, in the 108th Congress, with only a two-vote majority, the Republicans were in a weak position to implement this procedural maneuver.

On October 7, 2004, just prior to the presidential election, Senate Democrats issued a statement complete with statistics arguing that they were not obstructing Bush nominees in any systemic way. District court candidates nominated by Bush were being confirmed at a higher rate than those similarly situated candidates nominated by Presidents Ronald Reagan and Bill Clinton in their first term. Bush's success rate at getting circuit court of appeals nominees confirmed during his first term (67%) was less than those of Reagan (85%) and Clinton (71%), although higher than Clinton's second term (55%).

== 109th Congress ==
Things changed in 2005 due to the 2004 elections. With President Bush's re-election and the Republicans picking up further Senate seats (55–45) in the 109th Congress, the "nuclear option" became a more viable strategy to ensure confirmation. On May 24, 2005, seven moderate senators of each party, called the Gang of 14, in a deal to avoid the use of the "nuclear option", agreed to drop the filibuster against three of the seven remaining affected court of appeals nominees (Priscilla Owen, Janice Rogers Brown, and William Pryor) but not two others (Henry Saad and William Myers). In addition, the senators in the group agreed not to block future judicial nominees with filibusters except in cases involving "extraordinary circumstances".

As a direct result of the deal, the two filibustered nominees not mentioned in it (David McKeague and Richard Allen Griffin) were confirmed, as was Thomas B. Griffith, the person nominated to replace Miguel Estrada after his withdrawal. Griffith too had become the subject of controversy. Since Saad had no hope of a successful cloture vote to overcome his filibuster due to the deal, he withdrew his nomination in the spring of 2006. Bush nominee Raymond Kethledge would later be appointed to the seat.

At the end of the 109th Congress, a new controversy arose over William Myers and three other Bush court of appeals nominees who had not been specifically mentioned in the Gang deal but were still subject to its provisions: Terrence Boyle, William J. Haynes, II and Michael B. Wallace. These nominations were returned to the White House according to Senate rules on August 3, 2006, in advance of the annual August recess of Congress. When the Senate returned in September, it was only for a short period before a break for the 2006 midterm election. Although Boyle, Myers, Haynes and Wallace were renominated, again no action was taken on them in the Senate Judiciary Committee before the break, and their nominations were sent back a second time to the White House on September 29.

After the November 7, 2006 election in which Democrats picked up six additional Senate seats, President Bush again renominated the candidates whose nominations had been sent back to him in September. The Republican Judiciary Committee chairman, Senator Arlen Specter, however, said that he would not process these nominees during the lame duck session of the 109th Congress. Bush would later nominate Leslie H. Southwick to the seat Wallace was nominated for and he would be confirmed, while N. Randy Smith, who had previously been nominated for another seat on the Ninth Circuit, would be appointed to the seat Myers was nominated for. Obama nominee John B. Owens would later fill the seat Smith was originally nominated to. Southwick had previously been nominated to a seat on the United States District Court for the Southern District of Mississippi, which would later be filled by Obama nominee Carlton W. Reeves.

== 110th Congress ==
At the beginning of the 110th Congress in January 2007, President Bush did not renominate Boyle, Myers, Haynes and Wallace in an attempt at reconciliation with the Democrats. However, that did not stop many Bush judicial nominees from being blocked in committee by the new Democratic chairman of the Senate Judiciary Committee, Senator Patrick Leahy. Among those stalled in committee until their nominations lapsed were appellate nominees Peter Keisler, Robert J. Conrad, Steve A. Matthews and Glen E. Conrad. The latter three seats would later be filled by Obama nominees James A. Wynn Jr., Albert Diaz, and Barbara Milano Keenan.

Senator Harry Reid, the Democratic Majority Leader, and Chairman Leahy cited the previous controversy over President Clinton's court of appeals nominees in justifying why only ten Bush appellate nominees were confirmed during the 110th Congress. A total of eleven appellate seats with Bush nominees were left open at the end of the 110th Congress. Of those seats, two (i.e. the North Carolina and Maryland seats of the Fourth Circuit) had originally become available to fill during the administration of President Bill Clinton.

== Others who were considered for nomination ==
In the spring of 2001, then-Representative Christopher Cox and lawyer Peter Keisler were both considered for federal appellate judgeships. Cox was considered for a California seat on the Ninth Circuit and Keisler for a Maryland seat on the Fourth Circuit. Both withdrew themselves from consideration before a nomination could be made because their home state Democratic senators objected to them due to their perceived conservatism. The California seat that Cox had been considered for was eventually filled by Bush nominee Carlos Bea. In 2005, Cox was nominated and confirmed as Chairman of the U.S. Securities and Exchange Commission, a position he held until the end of the Bush administration in January 2009. The Maryland seat that Keisler had been considered for was to remain open the entirety of Bush's presidency with the failed nominations of Claude Allen and Rod J. Rosenstein and would be filled by Obama nominee Andre M. Davis. in 2009. In 2006, Keisler was unsuccessfully nominated to a seat on the D.C. Circuit. The seat would be filled by Obama nominee Patricia Millett in 2013. In 2007, after the resignation of Alberto Gonzales, Keisler became the Acting Attorney General until the confirmation of Michael Mukasey. He left the Department of Justice in March 2008 to return to private practice.

== See also ==
- Judicial appointment history for United States federal courts
- Deaths of United States federal judges in active service
