= Henry Anthony Politz =

American judge (1932–2002)

Senior Judge of the United States Court of Appeals for the Fifth Circuit
- In office August 10, 1999 – May 25, 2002

Chief Judge of the United States Court of Appeals for the Fifth Circuit
- In office January 16, 1992 – January 16, 1999
- Preceded by: Charles Clark
- Succeeded by: Carolyn Dineen King

Judge of the United States Court of Appeals for the Fifth Circuit
- In office July 13, 1979 – August 10, 1999
- Appointed by: Jimmy Carter
- Preceded by: Seat established by 92 Stat. 1629
- Succeeded by: Charles W. Pickering

Personal details
- Born: Henry Anthony Politz; May 9, 1932 Napoleonville, Louisiana, U.S.
- Died: May 25, 2002 (aged 70) Shreveport, Louisiana, U.S.
- Education: Louisiana State University (BA); Paul M. Hebert Law Center (JD)

Henry Anthony Politz (May 9, 1932 – May 25, 2002) was a United States circuit judge of the United States Court of Appeals for the Fifth Circuit.

== Education and career ==
Born in Napoleonville, Louisiana, Politz served in the United States Air Force from 1951 to 1955. He received a Bachelor of Arts degree from Louisiana State University in 1958 and a Juris Doctor from Paul M. Hebert Law Center at Louisiana State University in 1959. He was in private practice in Shreveport, Louisiana from 1959 to 1979.

== Federal judicial service ==
On May 3, 1979, Politz was nominated by President Jimmy Carter to a new seat on the United States Court of Appeals for the Fifth Circuit created by 92 Stat. 1629. He was confirmed by the United States Senate on July 12, 1979, and received his commission on July 13, 1979. He served as Chief Judge from January 16, 1992 to January 16, 1999. Politz assumed senior status on August 10, 1999 and served in that capacity until his death, on May 25, 2002, in Shreveport.

== Sources ==
Legal offices
Preceded by Seat established by 92 Stat. 1629	Judge of the United States Court of Appeals for the Fifth Circuit; 1979–1999	Succeeded by Charles W. Pickering
Preceded by Charles Clark	Chief Judge of the United States Court of Appeals for the Fifth Circuit; 1992–1999	Succeeded by Carolyn Dineen King
