= Chip Pickering =

American politician and businessman (born 1963)

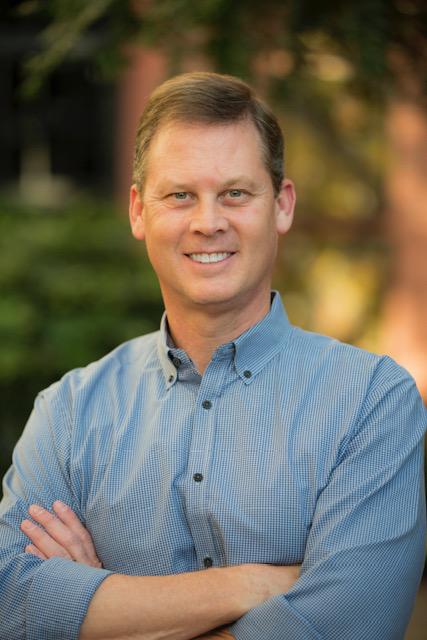
- Pickering in 2016

Member of the U.S. House of Representatives from Mississippi's 3rd district
- In office January 3, 1997 – January 3, 2009
- Preceded by: Sonny Montgomery
- Succeeded by: Gregg Harper

Personal details
- Born: Charles Willis Pickering Jr. August 10, 1963 (age 63) Laurel, Mississippi, U.S.
- Party: Republican
- Spouse(s): Leisha Pickering Beth Creekmore (m. 2015)
- Children: 5
- Relatives: Charles W. Pickering (father); Stacey Pickering (cousin)
- Education: University of Mississippi (BA); Baylor University (MBA)

Charles Willis "Chip" Pickering Jr. (born August 10, 1963) is an American businessman and former politician who has been the chief executive officer (CEO) of Incompas since 2014.

Pickering represented Mississippi's 3rd congressional district as a Republican in the United States House of Representatives from 1997 to 2009.

== Early life and education ==
Chip Pickering was born in Laurel, Mississippi, to attorney Charles W. Pickering. He is a cousin of Stacey Pickering, former State Auditor of Mississippi, Mississippi State Senator, and executive director of the Mississippi Veterans Affairs Board.

Pickering graduated with a bachelor's degree in business administration from the University of Mississippi where he was a legacy member of the Eta chapter of Sigma Chi. He went on to receive a Master of Business Administration from Baylor University in 1989.

== Career ==
=== Early years ===
Pickering was a Southern Baptist missionary in Hungary, after the Hungarian government ceased its persecution of religious believers.

In 1989, President George H. W. Bush appointed Pickering as a Department of Agriculture liaison to the former European Communist countries.

Pickering was a staff member of Senator Trent Lott between 1992 and 1996. He helped shape the Telecommunications Act of 1996, the first major overhaul of US telecoms law since 1934. After a year at the Senate Commerce Committee, Pickering ran for Congress. He defeated eight other Republicans in the primary and won the general election over Democrat John Arthur Eaves Jr. with 61 percent of the vote.

=== U.S. House of Representatives ===
==== Committee assignments ====
- Energy and Commerce Committee
  - Commerce, Trade and Consumer Protection Subcommittee
  - Energy and Air Quality Subcommittee
  - Telecommunications & the Internet Subcommittee

==== Tenure ====
In 1998, as chairman of the Basic Research Subcommittee of the U.S. House Science Committee, Pickering helped oversee the transition from a government research internet to a commercial internet, as well as the establishment of internet domain names, registries, and multi-stakeholder governance.

In 2002, Pickering contributed to legislation included in the 2002 Farm Bill, which doubled the funding for the conservation reserve, the wetland reserve programs, and other conservation initiatives administered by the U.S. Department of Agriculture.

Pickering served as George W. Bush's co-chairman for Mississippi in Bush's presidential campaigns in 2000 and 2004.

From 2003 to 2007, Pickering was vice-chairman of the Energy and Commerce Committee.

In 2008, Pickering, along with Bennie Thompson, received a Lewis-Houghton Leadership Award.

In January 2009, Pickering retired from the House of Representatives.

=== Post-political career ===
Pickering as an adjunct professor at the University of Mississippi's Department of Public Leadership Policy, where he teaches a bi-monthly seminar class, PPL 211: Political Campaigns.

In 2014, Pickering joined Incompas, where he is the CEO. Prior to this, he was a partner at Capitol Resources LLC, representing numerous companies and organizations.

Pickering also made a brief appearance in the 2006 film, Borat, as a speaker at a church that Borat attended.

In April 2023, the archives of Chip Pickering and Charles W. Pickering were donated to the Mississippi Political Collections, located at Mississippi State University's Mitchell Memorial Library, by them.

== Personal life ==
Pickering and his former wife, Leisha, have five sons. Chip Pickering filed for divorce in June 2008.

On July 16, 2009, Pickering's estranged wife filed a complaint in Hinds County (Mississippi) Circuit Court under Mississippi's alienation of affection law, alleging that Pickering and his college sweetheart Elizabeth Creekmore Byrd had a long-standing adulterous extramarital relationship during his congressional career in Washington, D.C. Creekmore Byrd is a member of Mississippi's Creekmore family that founded of the Cellular South telephone company. She further alleged in Pickering v. Pickering that Creekmore-Byrd insisted that Pickering turn down Mississippi Gov. Haley Barbour's 2007 offer of former Sen. Trent Lott's Senate seat so that Pickering could divorce his wife and the two of them be together. According to Max Blumenthal at The Daily Beast, "In the end, Pickering chose his mistress over his congressional career and his wife."

Pickering's family had a close relationship with Antonin Scalia.

U.S. House of Representatives
Preceded by Sonny Montgomery	Member of the U.S. House of Representatives from Mississippi's 3rd congressional district 1997–2009	Succeeded by Gregg Harper
U.S. order of precedence (ceremonial)
Preceded by John Hostettler as Former U.S. Representative	Order of precedence of the United States as Former U.S. Representative	Succeeded by Steven Palazzo as Former U.S. Representative
