= William Myers (lawyer) =

William Gerry Myers III (born July 13, 1955, Roanoke, Virginia) is an American lawyer and former nominee to the United States Court of Appeals for the Ninth Circuit.

== Background ==
Myers graduated from the College of William & Mary in 1977 and the University of Denver law school in 1981. He served as the Solicitor of the United States Department of the Interior, as Deputy General Counsel of the United States Department of Energy, as legislative counsel for Senator Alan K. Simpson of Wyoming, and was in private practice.

== Ninth Circuit nomination under Bush ==
In 2003, President George W. Bush nominated Myers to serve on the United States Court of Appeals for the Ninth Circuit. His nomination was filibustered by Democrats, who expressed opposition to Myers due to his perceived anti-environmental views. Opposition to his nomination was also opposed by Native American Tribes. Although the compromise reached by the "Gang of 14" guaranteed three previously blocked nominees (Priscilla Owen, Janice Rogers Brown and William Pryor) up-or-down votes in the full Senate, Myers and Michigan nominee Henry Saad were expressly denied the same assurance in the agreement. On January 9, 2007, Myers announced that he was withdrawing his nomination from any further consideration.

== See also ==
- George W. Bush judicial appointment controversies
- filibuster
- cloture
- nuclear option
- Gang of 14
