= Henry Saad =

American judge (born 1948)

Henry William Saad (born June 1948, in Detroit, Michigan) is a judge on the Michigan Court of Appeals and a former nominee to the United States Court of Appeals for the Sixth Circuit.

== Background ==
Judge Saad received his bachelor's degree from Wayne State University School of Business with honors and his Juris Doctor degree from Wayne State University, magna cum laude. He was a partner at Dickinson, Wright, Moon, Van Dusen & Freeman, where he practiced law for twenty years. He was also an arbitrator for the Michigan Employment Relations Commission and a hearing referee for the Michigan Department of Civil Rights.

On October 2, 1992, President George H. W. Bush nominated Saad to a seat on the United States District Court for the Eastern District of Michigan, but the Senate Judiciary Committee of the 102nd Congress failed to give him a hearing and let his nomination lapse.

Saad was appointed to the Michigan Court of Appeals in 1994, was elected for a six-year term in 1996, and was re-elected to a six-year term in 2002.

== Sixth Circuit nomination under Bush ==
On November 8, 2001, Saad was nominated by President George W. Bush to a seat on the United States Court of Appeals for the Sixth Circuit vacated by the Judge James L. Ryan who had taken senior status. On the same day, Bush also nominated David McKeague and Susan Bieke Neilson to Michigan seats on the Sixth Circuit. On June 26, 2002, Bush nominated Richard Allen Griffin to a fourth Michigan seat on the Sixth Circuit. During the Democratic-controlled 107th Congress, all four nominations were stalled in the Senate Judiciary Committee by then chairman, Senator Patrick Leahy, D-VT.

In the 2002 midterm congressional elections, the Republicans regained control of the Senate. During the new 108th Congress, Senator Orrin Hatch, R-UT, the new Republican chairman of the Senate Judiciary Committee began to process the previously blocked four nominees. In March 2003, Michigan's two Democratic senators, Carl Levin and Debbie Stabenow, announced that they would blue-slip all Bush judicial nominees from Michigan because Bush refused to renominate Helene White and Kathleen McCree Lewis, two liberal Michigan nominees, to the Sixth Circuit, whose nominations the Senate Republicans had refused to process during President Bill Clinton's second term. Helene White at the time was married to Levin's cousin.

Contrary to Levin's and Stabenow's wishes, Hatch gave Saad, McKeague and Griffin committee hearings, and passed the three nominees out of committee. Angered, Levin and Stabenow convinced their caucus to filibuster the three in order to prevent them from having confirmation votes.

The Senate Republicans increased their numbers in the 109th Congress. Tensions between the Republicans and Democrats rose dramatically as the Republicans contemplated breaking the filibusters of ten Bush court of appeals nominees (including Saad, McKeague and Griffin) by using the nuclear option. During a debate concerning filibusters and the nuclear option, Judge Saad was accused by Sen. Harry Reid (D-Nevada) of having a background that had some national security concerns, apparently in violation of various Senate rules (Senate Rule 29, Section 5). Various pundits condemned Sen. Reid for these remarks about a confidential security relationship, comparing it to the Valerie Plame affair within the Bush administration.

In order to defuse the increasingly hostile situation concerning the use of the nuclear option and Democrats' obstruction of President Bush's judicial nominations, fourteen moderate and institutionalist Republican and Democratic Senators known as the Gang of 14 joined together to forge an agreement that would defuse the situation. After negotiations, they agreed to guarantee certain filibustered nominations up or down votes in exchange for retaining the judicial filibuster. Henry Saad and William Myers, however, were expressly excluded from the guarantee. Saad was excluded due to further opposition from Levin and Stabenow because he had angered Stabenow in September 2003 by sending out an e-mail critical of her participation in his original obstruction. In the e-mail, Saad wrote to a supporter about Stabenow, "This is the game they play. Pretend to do the right thing while abusing the system and undermining the constitutional process. Perhaps some day she will pay the price for her misconduct." Stabenow became aware of the e-mail when Saad accidentally sent it not only to the supporter but also to Stabenow's office.

On March 23, 2006, with no hope of a confirmation vote, Saad withdrew his nomination. His 2001-2006 nomination is one of the longest nominations never acted upon by the Senate. His nomination was later replaced by that of Raymond Kethledge, who was only confirmed in 2008 after Bush reluctantly agreed to renominate Helene White, now divorced from Levin's cousin, to the Sixth Circuit.

== Current life ==
In November 2007, the Michigan Supreme Court appointed Judge Saad to a two-year term as chief judge of the Court of Appeals beginning January 1, 2008.

He is an adjunct professor at the University of Detroit/Mercy School of Law and Wayne State University Law School, where he teaches Evidence, Public Sector Labor and Professional Responsibility, respectively. Judge Saad serves on the boards of Detroit Public Television, the American Heart Association and Brother Rice High School.

Saad's wife, attorney Mara Letica Saad, was nominated by President George H. W. Bush in 1992 to be ambassador to Croatia. The nomination came late in Bush's presidency, however, and never was acted upon by the United States Senate before Bush's presidency ended. President Bill Clinton chose not to renominate her.

== See also ==
- Bill Clinton judicial appointment controversies
- George W. Bush judicial appointment controversies
- Filibuster
- Cloture
- Nuclear option
- Gang of 14
