= Leslie H. Southwick =

American judge (born 1950)

Leslie Southwick
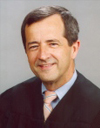

Judge of the United States Court of Appeals for the Fifth Circuit
- Incumbent
- Assumed office October 29, 2007
- Appointed by: George W. Bush
- Preceded by: Charles W. Pickering

Personal details
- Born: Leslie Harburd Southwick; 1950 (age 75–76) Edinburg, Texas, U.S.
- Education: Rice University (BA); University of Texas, Austin (JD)

Military service
- Allegiance: United States
- Branch/service: United States Army
- Years of service: 1993–1997 (reserve); 1997–2008 (guard)
- Rank: Lieutenant Colonel
- Unit: Army Judge Advocate General's Corps; United States Army Reserve; Mississippi National Guard
- Battles/wars: Iraq War

Leslie Harburd Southwick (born 1950) is a United States circuit judge of the United States Court of Appeals for the Fifth Circuit and a former judge of the Mississippi Court of Appeals.

== Early life and education ==
Born in Edinburg, Texas, Southwick graduated with a Bachelor of Arts degree cum laude from Rice University in 1972 and received his Juris Doctor from the University of Texas School of Law in 1975.

== Career ==
Following law school, Southwick clerked for the Presiding Judge, John F. Onion, Jr., of the Texas Court of Criminal Appeals from 1975 to 1976, and then, in Mississippi, for Judge Charles Clark of the United States Fifth Circuit Court of Appeals from 1976 to 1977.

Southwick was in private practice as an attorney in Jackson, Mississippi with the firm Brunini, Grantham, Grower & Hewes from 1977 to 1989, serving as a partner from 1983 to 1989. In 1989, Southwick entered government service as a Deputy Assistant Attorney General for the United States Department of Justice Civil Division. There he supervised the one hundred and twenty-five lawyers of the Federal Programs Branch, which defends suits brought against the United States. He also supervised the Office of Consumer Litigation, a twenty-five lawyer division charged with civil and criminal enforcement of federal consumer laws.

Southwick was elected one of the first ten judges of the Mississippi Court of Appeals in 1994. He was a candidate for a seat on the Supreme Court of Mississippi in 1996, coming in third out of five candidates in the general election. He thereafter remained on the court of appeals until the end of 2006 when, with a nomination to a lifetime position in the federal judiciary pending, he did not run for re-election. He attended The Judge Advocate General's Legal Center and School at the University of Virginia and entered the United States Army Judge Advocate General's Corps from 1992 to 1997. Southwick was on a leave of absence from the court from August 2004 to January 2006. In 2005, he served in Iraq in support of Operation Iraqi Freedom as a Judge Advocate General with the 155th Brigade Combat Team of Mississippi Army National Guard.

Southwick also taught law as an adjunct professor at the Mississippi College School of Law and was a member of the American Inns of Court, Charles Clark Chapter.

=== Federal judicial service ===
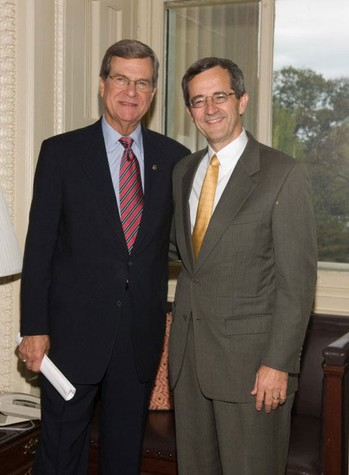
Southwick with Trent Lott in October 2007

On January 9, 2007, President George W. Bush nominated Southwick to fill a seat on the United States Court of Appeals for the Fifth Circuit vacated by Judge Charles W. Pickering, who retired in 2004. Bush had previously elevated Pickering to the Fifth Circuit with a recess appointment in January 2004, after Senate Democrats blocked two previous attempts to appoint Pickering in 2001 and 2003. In December 2004, Pickering announced that he would retire from the federal bench and would not seek a nomination for a permanent seat on the Fifth Circuit. Originally, Bush nominated Mississippi attorney Michael B. Wallace in the 109th Congress to replace Pickering, but his nomination also became stalled due to fierce opposition from Senate Democrats. Upon the Democratic takeover of Congress in the November 2006 elections, Wallace asked President Bush not to re-nominate him in the 110th Congress.

Finding itself without a nominee to a judgeship that had already sat vacant for two years, the White House turned to Southwick, then a nominee to a vacancy on the United States District Court for the Southern District of Mississippi. Bush had nominated him on June 9, 2006 to fill a vacancy on that court left by Judge William H. Barbour Jr., who retired on February 4, 2006. Southwick had a hearing before the Senate Judiciary Committee on September 19, 2006 and was reported favorably to the floor of the Senate by the Committee on September 29, 2006. However, Southwick, like many other judicial nominees, failed to receive a vote by the full Senate before the 109th Congress adjourned for good on December 9, 2006. Pursuant to Senate rules of procedure, his nomination, along with many others, was returned to the President.

Southwick's successive federal nominations within seven months of each other, though unusual, were not unprecedented. In May 2006, the Bush White House similarly nominated Jerome A. Holmes to a vacancy on the United States Court of Appeals for the Tenth Circuit after nominating him to a vacancy on the United States District Court for the Northern District of Oklahoma in February 2006.

The Senate Judiciary Committee of the 110th Congress held a hearing on Southwick's nomination to the Fifth Circuit on May 10, 2007. The hearing was chaired by Rhode Island Democrat Sheldon Whitehouse. Just prior to the hearing, controversy arose over the nomination.

Southwick's nomination was opposed by the People for the American Way, the Human Rights Campaign, and the Congressional Black Caucus, who alleged that Southwick was racially intolerant and homophobic. Two cases that Southwick participated in as a state judge formed the primary basis for the groups' charges.

In the first case, Richmond v. Mississippi Department of Human Services, Southwick joined the majority opinion upholding the decision of the Mississippi Employee Appeals Board to reinstate a white state employee (Richmond) who was fired for a single incident of referring to a black co-worker as a "good ole nigger" outside of the co-worker's presence. When the black co-worker was informed of Richmond's comment, Richmond immediately apologized, and her apology apparently was accepted. The Appeals Board's decision to reinstate Richmond was based, in part, on a hearing officer's opinion that the slur was only "somewhat derogatory" and "was in effect calling the individual a 'teacher's pet.'". Bound by law to affirm a decision of the Appeals Board supported by substantial factual evidence, the court held it had no authority to set aside the findings in this case, even though Richmond's remark was "undoubtedly ill-advised and indicative of a rather remarkable insensitivity.".

On writ of certiorari, the Mississippi Supreme Court agreed that "the unique circumstances of this case do not warrant imposition of the ultimate penalty of dismissal." However, the court found the record was insufficient to uphold the Employee Appeals Board's decision that Richmond effectively receive no penalty whatsoever. It decided to remand the case "in order for the board to impose an appropriate penalty less than dismissal, or to make detailed findings as to why no penalty should be imposed."

The second case often cited by Southwick's critics is S.B. v. L.W., an 8-2 decision upholding a chancellor's decision to grant sole custody of an eight-year-old girl to her father, in part because the mother was a lesbian who had lived with several different partners during the child's life. Southwick joined the majority opinion as well as a concurrence written by Judge Payne which states, in part:

¶ 33. I do recognize that any adult may choose any activity in which to engage; however, I also am aware that such person is not thereby relieved of the consequences of his or her choice. It is a basic tenet that an individual's exercise of freedom will not also provide an escape of the consequences flowing from the free exercise of such a choice. As with the present situation, the mother may view her decision to participate in a homosexual relationship as an exertion of her perceived right to do so. However, her choice is of significant consequence, as described before in the discussion of our State's policies, in that her rights to custody of her child may be significantly impacted.

After intense Democratic opposition, Southwick was reported out of Committee by a 10-9 vote on August 2, 2007 when Democratic California Senator Dianne Feinstein voted with the Committee's nine Republicans to send Southwick to the full Senate with a favorable report. Southwick was confirmed by a 59–38 vote on October 24, 2007. Southwick's confirmation came almost ten months after his nomination to the Fifth Circuit and over a year after he was first nominated to a federal judgeship. He received his commission on October 29, 2007. Southwick was sworn in as judge of the Fifth Circuit on October 30, 2007.

His first published opinion for the Fifth Circuit was Anthony v. United States, which was released on March 4, 2008. Southwick wrote for a unanimous three judge panel on an issue involving the valuation of private annuities for estate tax purposes. His first published dissent was in Louisiana ex rel. Caldwell v. Allstate Insurance Co., 536 F.3d 418 (5th Cir. 2008) in which Southwick dissented from the assumption of federal jurisdiction under the Class Action Fairness Act.

In August 2018, Southwick found that the Texas Medical Board was entitled to qualified immunity for its unconstitutional warrantless search of a doctor's patient records, drawing an unusual concurrence dubitante from Circuit Judge Don Willett.

== Personal ==
Southwick is married, and is Roman Catholic. He served in the Mississippi National Guard, where he has attained the rank of lieutenant colonel.

== Bibliography ==
- Presidential Also-Rans & Running Mates, 1788-1996. Published by McFarland & Co., Jefferson, NC, 1998 (second edition)
- The Nominee: A Political and Spiritual Journey. Published by University Press of Mississippi, Jackson, Miss, 2013

== See also ==
- George W. Bush judicial appointment controversies

Legal offices
Preceded by Charles W. Pickering	Judge of the United States Court of Appeals for the Fifth Circuit; 2007–present	Incumbent
