= Michael Wallace (lawyer) =

American lawyer (born 1951)

- Born: Michael Brunson Wallace; January 1, 1951 (age 75); Biloxi, Mississippi, U.S.
- Education: Harvard University (BA); University of Virginia (JD)
- Occupation: Lawyer

Michael Brunson Wallace (born January 1, 1951) is an American lawyer and a former nominee to the United States Court of Appeals for the Fifth Circuit.

== Early life ==
Michael Wallace was born January 1, 1951, in Biloxi, Mississippi. He received his bachelor's degree cum laude from Harvard University in 1973. In 1976, he graduated from the University of Virginia School of Law, where he served on the Virginia Law Review and was named to the Order of the Coif. Wallace then clerked for Mississippi Supreme Court Justice Harry G. Walker from 1976 until 1977 and then-Associate Supreme Court Justice William Rehnquist from 1977 until 1978.

== Career ==
From 1980 to 1981, Wallace worked as a research analyst for the United States House of Representatives House Republican Research Committee. From 1980 to 1983, he worked as the counsel for the Office of the Republican Whip in the U.S. House under future Mississippi senator Trent Lott. Wallace was a legislative consultant to the Administrative Conference of the United States from 1984 to 1994. The Conference's primary responsibility was to examine administrative processes in Congress and federal agencies for the purpose of recommending improvements.

From 1984 to 1990, Mr. Wallace served as a board member of the Legal Services Corporation, a private, non-profit corporation established by Congress to promote the availability of legal services to the indigent. He served as board chairman from 1988 to 1990. From 1983 to 1986, Mr. Wallace was an associate at the Jackson, Mississippi law firm of Jones, Mockbee, Bass & Hodge. For a substantial time he was a partner at Phelps Dunbar LLP, also in Jackson. In 1992, President George H. W. Bush considered Mr. Wallace for nomination to the federal bench. His name was submitted to the American Bar Association for review, and some civil rights organizations expressed their opposition. The nomination never came before Congress. He is currently a shareholder with the firm of Wise, Carter, Child & Caraway in Jackson, Mississippi.

== Fifth Circuit nomination under Bush ==
On February 8, 2006, President George W. Bush nominated Wallace to the United States Court of Appeals for the Fifth Circuit to fill the seat vacated when Charles W. Pickering, a recess appointment to the Court in January 2004, retired at the end of that year.

Wallace was opposed by the Senate Democrats and various advocacy groups, who asserted Wallace had tried to undermine meaningful enforcement of the U.S. civil rights laws. In addition, as chair of the Legal Services Corporation, Wallace had been criticized by Democrats and a few moderate Republicans for seeking to undermine the agency. He authorized the use of LSC funds to lobby Congress for cuts in LSC's budget and to pay lawyers to prepare a memo arguing for LSC's abolition. Republican Senator Warren Rudman characterized Wallace's appeal to Congress as "absolutely bad faith."

The American Bar Association's judicial-evaluations committee determined that Wallace "has the highest professional competence" and "possesses the integrity to serve on the bench," but gave him a unanimous "not qualified" rating, finding him lacking on the element of "judicial temperament." Senate Republicans blamed the "not qualified" rating on liberal bias within the American Bar Association's leadership and judicial-evaluations committee.

In December 2006, Wallace announced that he was withdrawing his name from consideration for the Fifth Circuit. In September 2007, Leslie H. Southwick was confirmed to the seat.

== See also ==
- George W. Bush judicial appointment controversies
