= Shalom D. Stone =

American lawyer (born 1963)

Shalom David Stone (born 1963 in Fort Dix, New Jersey) is an American lawyer at the firm of Stone Conroy LLC in Florham Park, New Jersey, and was formerly a nominee to the United States Court of Appeals for the Third Circuit.

== Background ==
Stone graduated from Yeshiva College with a B.A. in 1984. He earned his J.D. from New York University School of Law in 1987.

From 1987 to 1991, Stone worked as an associate at Sills, Cummis, Tichman, Epstein & Gross, another New Jersey law firm. In 1991, Stone joined Walder, Hayden & Brogan, a law firm in Roseland, New Jersey, where he became a partner. In February 2014, Stone joined Brown Moskowitz & Kallen in Summit, New Jersey. In February 2017, Stone co-founded the law firm of Stone Conroy LLC in Florham Park, New Jersey.

Stone's practice areas include criminal defense; litigation of business disputes, contracts, real estate, securities, insurance, and RICO; and legal ethics. He has also served as Chair of the Federal Practice and Procedure Section for the New Jersey State Bar Association, and as a member of the Lawyers' Advisory Committee for the United States District Court for the District of New Jersey

== Third Circuit nomination under Bush ==
Stone was nominated by President George W. Bush on July 17, 2007 to fill a New Jersey seat on the United States Court of Appeals for the Third Circuit caused by Judge Samuel Alito's elevation to the Supreme Court. The nomination was made without input from New Jersey's two Democratic senators, Frank Lautenberg and Robert Menendez.

Originally, Bush had indicated that he would nominate district court judge Noel Hillman of the United States District Court for the District of New Jersey, whom both senators had approved for elevation. Bush, however, had concerns about the confirmation process for Hillman, who was the lead prosecutor in the Jack Abramoff lobbying scandal and headed the Department of Justice's Public Integrity Section. The hearings could have become a forum for Democratic inquisition into why some corruption matters during Bush's administration had not been vigorously investigated.

Lautenberg and Menendez were unhappy about being shut out of the selection process and about President Bush abandoning the presumptive nominee. "The sudden manner in which the previous consensus nominee for this slot was withdrawn and the uncooperative unilateral manner in which this [new] nomination was made certainly raises serious concerns," said a Menendez spokesperson. Without the support of either of his state's senators, Stone was denied a Senate Judiciary Committee hearing in the 110th Congress by the committee's Democratic chairman, Senator Patrick Leahy D-VT.
