= Nuclear option =

Parliamentary procedure of the United States Senate

In the United States Senate, the nuclear option is a legislative procedure that allows the Senate to override a standing rule by a simple majority, avoiding the two-thirds supermajority, which is normally required to invoke cloture on a change to the standing rules. The term "nuclear option" is an analogy to nuclear weapons being the most extreme option in warfare. The use of the nuclear option to abolish the 60-vote threshold for cloture on legislation has been proposed but not successfully effected.

The nuclear option can be invoked by a senator raising a point of order that contravenes a standing rule. The presiding officer would then overrule the point of order based on Senate rules and precedents; this ruling would then be appealed and overturned by a simple majority vote (or a tie vote), establishing a new precedent. The nuclear option is made possible by the principle in Senate procedure that appeals from rulings of the chair on points of order relating to nondebatable questions are themselves nondebatable. The nuclear option is most often discussed in connection with the filibuster. Since cloture is a nondebatable question, an appeal in relation to cloture is decided without debate. This obviates the usual requirement for a two-thirds majority to invoke cloture on a resolution amending the Standing Rules of the United States Senate.

The nuclear option was invoked on November 21, 2013, when a Democratic majority led by Harry Reid used the procedure to reduce the cloture threshold for nominations, other than nominations to the U.S. Supreme Court, to a simple majority. On April 6, 2017, the nuclear option was used again, this time by a Republican majority led by Mitch McConnell, to extend that precedent to Supreme Court nominations, in order to enable cloture to be invoked on the nomination of Neil Gorsuch by a simple majority.

== Procedure to invoke the nuclear option ==
On November 21, 2013, following a failed cloture vote on a nomination, the nuclear option was used, as follows:

Mr. REID. I raise a point of order that the vote on cloture under Rule XXII for all nominations other than for the Supreme Court of the United States is by majority vote.
The PRESIDENT pro tempore. Under the rules, the point of order is not sustained.
Mr. REID. I appeal the ruling of the Chair and ask for the yeas and nays.
(48–52 vote on sustaining the decision of the chair)
The PRESIDENT pro tempore. The decision of the Chair is not sustained.
The PRESIDENT pro tempore. *** Under the precedent set by the Senate today, November 21, 2013, the threshold for cloture on nominations, not including those to the Supreme Court of the United States, is now a majority. That is the ruling of the Chair.

Once the presiding officer rules on the point of order, if the underlying question is nondebatable, any appeal is decided without debate. A simple majority is needed to sustain a decision of the chair. As the appeal is nondebatable, there is no supermajority requirement for cloture, as would be necessary for a proposition amending the rules. The presiding officer and the standing rule can therefore be overruled by a simple majority. This procedure establishes a new precedent that supersedes the plain text of the Standing Rules. These precedents will then be relied upon by future presiding officers in determining questions of procedure. For example, the procedure may override requirements of Rule XXII, the cloture rule, in order to allow a filibuster to be broken without the usual 60-vote requirement.

== Background ==
=== The 60-vote rule ===
Originally, the Senate's rules did not provide for a procedure for the Senate to vote to end debate on a question so that it could be voted on, which opened the door to filibusters. In 1917, the Senate introduced a procedure to allow for ending debate (invoking cloture) with a two-thirds majority, later reduced in 1975 to three-fifths of the senators duly chosen and sworn (60 if there is no more than one vacancy). Thus, although a measure might have majority support, opposition from or absence by at least 41 senators can effectively defeat a bill by preventing debate on it from ending, in a tactic known as a filibuster.

Since the 1970s, the Senate has also used a "two-track" procedure whereby Senate business may continue on other topics while one item is being filibustered. Since filibusters no longer require the minority to actually hold the floor and bring all other business to a halt, the mere threat of a filibuster has gradually become normalized. In the modern Senate, this means that most measures now typically requires 60 votes to advance, unless a specific exception limiting the time for debate applies. Changing Rule XXII to eliminate the 60-vote threshold is made difficult by the rules themselves. Rule XXII, paragraph 2, states that to end debate on any proposition "to amend the Senate rules ... the necessary affirmative vote shall be two-thirds of the Senators present and voting". If all senators vote, 67 votes are required to invoke cloture on a proposition to amend a rule.

=== Terminology ===
Republican senator Ted Stevens suggested using a ruling of the chair to defeat a filibuster of judicial nominees in February 2003. The code word for the plan was "Hulk". Weeks later, Senator Trent Lott coined the term nuclear option in March 2003 because the maneuver was seen as a last resort with possibly major consequences for both sides. The metaphor of a nuclear strike refers to the majority party unilaterally imposing a change to the filibuster rule, which might provoke retaliation by the minority party.

The alternative term "constitutional option" is often used with particular regard to confirmation of executive and judicial nominations, on the theory that the United States Constitution requires these nominations to receive the "advice and consent" of the Senate. Proponents of this term argue that the Constitution implies that the Senate can act by a majority vote unless the Constitution itself requires a supermajority, as it does for certain measures such as the ratification of treaties. By effectively requiring a supermajority of the Senate to fulfil this function, proponents believed that (before the changes—such as the change made in 2013—to require only a simple majority) the previous Senate practice prevented the Senate from exercising its constitutional mandate. The remedy was therefore called the "constitutional option".

=== 2005 debate on judicial nominations ===
The maneuver was brought to prominence in 2005 when Majority Leader Bill Frist threatened its use to end Democratic-led filibusters of judicial nominees submitted by President George W. Bush. In response to this threat, Democrats threatened to obstruct all routine Senate business. The ultimate confrontation was prevented by the Gang of 14, a group of seven Democratic and seven Republican Senators, all of whom agreed to oppose the nuclear option and oppose filibusters of judicial nominees, except in extraordinary circumstances. Several of the blocked nominees were brought to the floor, voted upon and approved as specified in the agreement, and others were dropped and did not come up for a vote, as implied by the agreement.

=== Rules reforms, 2011 and 2013 ===
In 2011, with a Democratic majority in the Senate (but not a 60-vote majority), Senators Jeff Merkley and Tom Udall proposed "a sweeping filibuster reform package" to be implemented by the nuclear option, but Majority Leader Harry Reid dissuaded them from pushing it forward. The nuclear option was raised again following the congressional elections of 2012, with Senate Democrats still in the majority (but short of a supermajority). The Democrats had been the majority party in the Senate since 2007, but only briefly did they have the 60 votes necessary to halt a filibuster. The Hill reported that Democrats would "likely" use the nuclear option in January 2013 to effect filibuster reform, but the two parties managed to negotiate two packages of amendments to Senate rules concerning filibusters that were agreed to on January 24, 2013, thus avoiding the need for the nuclear option.

In July 2013, the nuclear option was raised as nominations were being blocked by Senate Republicans as Senate Democrats prepared to push through a change to the chamber's filibuster rule. On July 16, the Senate Democratic majority came within hours of using the nuclear option to win confirmation of seven of President Obama's long-delayed executive branch appointments. The confrontation was avoided when the White House withdrew two of the nominations in exchange for the other five being brought to the floor for a vote, where they were confirmed.

== Recent usage ==
=== 1995: Hutchison precedent ===
Rule XVI of the Standing Rules of the Senate prohibits legislative material from being included in general appropriations bills. In 1995, during consideration of the Emergency Supplemental Appropriations and Rescissions for the Department of Defense to Preserve and Enhance Military Readiness Act of 1995, Senator Kay Bailey Hutchison offered an amendment that would have changed existing law regarding endangered species, therefore violating Rule XVI. Senator Harry Reid raised a point of order against the amendment, which the chair sustained. Hutchison appealed the ruling of the chair. The Senate voted against sustaining the decision of the chair by a vote of 42–57. The Senate thus set a precedent nullifying the provision of Rule XVI. In 1999, the Hutchison precedent was overturned (and the original effect of Rule XVI restored) when the Senate agreed to S.Res. 160, which states:

Resolved, That the presiding officer of the Senate should apply all precedents of the Senate under rule 16, in effect at the conclusion of the 103d Congress.

=== 1996: FedEx precedent ===
Rule XXVIII, paragraph 3, of the Standing Rules of the Senate prohibits any matter outside the scope of a conference from being included in a conference report. In 1996, during consideration of the conference report on the Federal Aviation Reauthorization Act of 1996, Majority Leader Trent Lott raised a point of order that the conference report exceeded the scope of the conference with respect to provisions relating to FedEx. After the point of order was sustained by the chair, Lott appealed the ruling of the chair. The Senate voted against sustaining the decision of the chair by a vote of 39–56. The Senate thus set a precedent nullifying the provision of Rule XXVIII. In 2000, the FedEx precedent was overturned (and the original effect of Rule XXVIII restored) when Congress passed the Legislative Branch Appropriations Act for fiscal year 2001, which states, in relevant part:

SEC. 903. Beginning on the first day of the 107th Congress, the Presiding Officer of the Senate shall apply all of the precedents of the Senate under Rule XXVIII in effect at the conclusion of the 103d Congress.

=== 2013: Cloture on nominations ===
On November 21, 2013, Majority Leader Harry Reid raised a point of order that "the vote on cloture under Rule XXII for all nominations other than for the Supreme Court of the United States is by majority vote." The presiding officer overruled the point of order, and the Senate voted 48–52 against sustaining the decision of the chair. The Senate therefore set a precedent that cloture can be invoked on nominations (except to the Supreme Court) by a simple majority, even though the plain text of the rule requires "three-fifths of the senators duly chosen and sworn" to invoke cloture. Three Democrats (Carl Levin, Joe Manchin and Mark Pryor) voted with all Republicans in favor of sustaining the decision of the chair. The text of Rule XXII was never changed. Although the 60-vote threshold was eliminated for most nominations, nominations are still susceptible to being delayed by filibusters, and 60 votes were still required to invoke cloture on other questions such as legislation and Supreme Court nominations.

==== Rationale for change ====
The Democrats' stated motivation for this change was the perceived expansion of filibustering by Republicans during the Obama administration, in particular blocking three nominations to the United States Court of Appeals for the District of Columbia Circuit. Republicans had asserted that the D.C. Circuit was underworked, and also cited the need for cost reduction by reducing the number of judges in that circuit. At the time of the vote, 59 executive branch nominees and 17 judicial nominees were awaiting confirmation.

Prior to November 21, 2013, there had been only 168 cloture motions filed (or reconsidered) with regard to nominations. Nearly half of them (82) had been during the Obama administration. However, those cloture motions were often filed merely to speed things along, rather than in response to any filibuster. In contrast, there were just 38 cloture motions on nominations during the preceding eight years under President George W. Bush. Most of those cloture votes were successful. Obama won Senate confirmation for 30 out of 42 (71%) federal appeals court nominations, compared with Bush's 35 out of 52 (67%).

Regarding Obama's federal district court nominations, the Senate approved 143 out of 173 (83%) as of November 2013, compared to George W. Bush's first term 170 of 179 (95%), Bill Clinton's first term 170 of 198 (86%), and George H.W. Bush's 150 of 195 (77%). Filibusters were used on 20 of Obama's nominations to district court positions, but Republicans had allowed confirmation of 19 out of the 20 before the nuclear option was invoked.

=== 2017: Cloture on Supreme Court nominations ===
On April 6, 2017, the Republican-majority Senate invoked the nuclear option and voted 48–52 along party lines against sustaining the decision of the chair on a point of order raised by Majority Leader Mitch McConnell, thus removing the Supreme Court exception created in 2013. This established a new precedent which allowed cloture to be invoked on Supreme Court nominations by a simple majority. The vote came after Senate Democrats filibustered the nomination of Neil Gorsuch to the Supreme Court of the United States.

=== 2019: Postcloture time on low-level nominations ===
On April 3, 2019, in response to a perceived increase in postcloture filibusters by Senate Democrats on President Trump's executive and judicial nominations, the Republican-majority Senate voted 51-49 to overturn a ruling of the chair and thus set a precedent that postcloture debate on nominations—other than those to the Supreme Court of the United States, to the United States courts of appeals and to positions at Level I of the Executive Schedule—is two hours. All Republicans except Senators Susan Collins and Mike Lee voted against sustaining the decision of the chair.

=== 2025 instances called "nuclear" ===
Senate Democrats accused the Republican majority under Majority Leader John Thune of exercising the nuclear option three times in 2025:

- to allow consideration of joint resolutions of disapproval under the Congressional Review Act,
- to allow the use of a current policy budget baseline for scoring of the One Big Beautiful Bill Act, and
- to allow the consideration in executive session of a resolution allowing the Majority Leader to move to proceed to the en bloc consideration of multiple nominations.

== Proposed use for legislation ==
Following elimination of the 60-vote rule for nominations in 2013, senators expressed concerns that the 60-vote rule will eventually be eliminated for legislation via the nuclear option. During his first term as President, Donald Trump spoke out against the 60-vote requirement for legislation on several occasions. Then-Senate Majority Leader Mitch McConnell opposed abolishing the filibuster despite Trump's demands, and in April 2017, 61 senators (32 Republicans, 28 Democrats, and one independent) signed a letter stating their opposition to abolishing the filibuster for legislation. On January 21, 2018, Trump said on Twitter that if the shutdown stalemate continued, Republicans should consider the "nuclear option" in the Senate. He repeated the call on December 21, 2018, with a fresh shutdown looming.

Concerns about abolishing the filibuster through the nuclear option were reiterated in 2021 with the Democratic-majority Senate. On January 3, 2022, Senate Majority Leader Chuck Schumer announced that the Senate would vote on using the nuclear option to reform the filibuster in order to pass his party's election reform legislation. On January 19, 2022, Schumer made a point of order that would have allowed a 'talking filibuster' on a voting rights bill without any other dilatory measures. The Senate voted 52–48 to sustain the decision of the chair overruling the point of order. Senators Joe Manchin and Kyrsten Sinema voted with all Republicans in favor of sustaining the decision of the chair. In September 2024, then Vice President and presidential candidate Kamala Harris called for ending the filibuster to enact abortion legislation.

== Other uses of "nuclear option" ==
After the appointment of Amy Coney Barrett to the Supreme Court of the United States, a proposed countermove to increase the size of the Supreme Court past nine seats (and thereby create new vacancies) was also described as a "nuclear option". Beyond the specific context of the U.S. Senate, the term "nuclear option" has come to be used generically for a procedural maneuver with potentially serious consequences, to be used as a last resort to overcome political opposition. The term has been used in connection with procedural maneuvers in various state senates.

In a 2005 legal ruling on the validity of the Hunting Act 2004, the UK House of Lords, sitting in its judicial capacity, used "nuclear option" to describe the events of 1832, when the then-government threatened to create hundreds of new Whig peers to force the Tory-dominated Lords to accept the Reform Act 1832. Nuclear weapons were not theorized until the 20th century, so the government's threat was not labeled as "nuclear" at the time.

== See also ==
- Cloture
- George W. Bush judicial appointment controversies
- George W. Bush Supreme Court candidates
- Judicial appointment history for United States federal courts
- Reconciliation (United States Congress)
- United States federal judge
- Up or down vote
