= Charles W. Pickering =

American judge (born 1937)

Charles Pickering
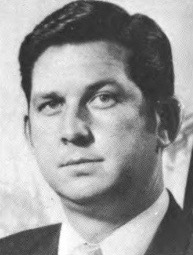

Judge of the United States Court of Appeals for the Fifth Circuit
- In office January 16, 2004 – December 8, 2004
- Appointed by: George W. Bush
- Preceded by: Henry Anthony Politz
- Succeeded by: Leslie H. Southwick

Judge of the United States District Court for the Southern District of Mississippi
- In office October 1, 1990 – January 16, 2004
- Appointed by: George H. W. Bush
- Preceded by: Walter Nixon
- Succeeded by: Keith Starrett

Chair of the Mississippi Republican Party
- In office 1976–1978
- Preceded by: Clarke Reed
- Succeeded by: Michael Retzer

Personal details
- Born: Charles Willis Pickering Sr. May 29, 1937 (age 89) Laurel, Mississippi, U.S.
- Party: Democratic (before 1964); Republican (1964–present)
- Children: Chip
- Relatives: Stacey Pickering (nephew)
- Education: Jones College; University of Mississippi (BA, LLB)

Charles Willis Pickering Sr. (born May 29, 1937) is an American attorney, politician, and jurist who served as a United States district judge of the United States District Court for the Southern District of Mississippi and, briefly, of the United States Court of Appeals for the Fifth Circuit, based in New Orleans, Louisiana.

== Early life and education ==
Pickering is the father of former U.S. Representative Charles "Chip" Pickering Jr., and the uncle of Stacey Pickering, former State Auditor of Mississippi, Mississippi State Senator, and executive director of the Mississippi Veterans Affairs Board.

A native of Laurel in southern Mississippi, Pickering attended Jones County Junior College and then received a Bachelor of Arts degree in 1959 from the University of Mississippi at Oxford. He earned his law degree in 1961 from the University of Mississippi School of Law.

== Career ==
In the early 1960s, Pickering was active in the Democratic Party, but he switched affiliation in 1964 to the Mississippi Republican Party. At the time, Pickering said that "the people of [my] state were heaped with humiliation and embarrassment at the Democratic Convention" in Atlantic City, New Jersey. At the convention, African Americans, who had been disenfranchised in the Deep South since Reconstruction, formed the Mississippi Freedom Democratic Party to challenge the predominantly white party establishment. A month before the convention, U.S. President Lyndon B. Johnson had signed the Civil Rights Act of 1964.

Along with other disaffected Democrats, Pickering played a key role in building his state's Republican Party.

As a young prosecutor in the 1960s, Pickering worked closely with the FBI to pursue the Ku Klux Klan in Mississippi. In 1966, he testified against Klan member Sam Bowers, who was being tried for the murder of civil rights activist Vernon Dahmer. After testifying, Pickering and his family needed FBI protection. The Klan later claimed victory when Pickering was defeated in his campaign for a seat in the Mississippi House of Representatives.

Pickering was appointed and served as city prosecuting attorney in Laurel. He was thereafter elected and served four years as the Jones County prosecutor. After serving briefly as Laurel Municipal Judge, he was elected to two terms in the Mississippi State Senate from 1972 to 1980.

In 1978, Pickering sought the Republican nomination for the United States Senate seat being vacated by veteran Democrat James O. Eastland, but he lost his party's nomination to U.S. Representative Thad Cochran of Mississippi's 4th congressional district. Cochran won in a three-way general election against Democrat Maurice Dantin and Independent Charles Evers, a well-known figure in the civil rights movement. In 1979 Pickering ran for state attorney general, but he narrowly lost to Democrat and later Governor, William Allain. He ran on the ticket headed for the second consecutive time by the GOP gubernatorial nominee, businessman Gil Carmichael. From 1976 to 1978, Pickering was the chairman of the Mississippi Republican Party, having succeeded Clarke Reed.

In 1976, Pickering chaired the subcommittee of the Republican Party's Platform Committee, which called for a constitutional amendment to overturn Roe v. Wade, which established a woman's right to abortion. In 1984, as president of the Mississippi Baptist Convention, Pickering was presiding when the Convention adopted a resolution calling for legislation to outlaw abortion unless the life of the woman was in danger.

On October 2, 1990, Pickering was appointed to the federal district court by President George H. W. Bush.

=== Fifth Circuit nomination ===
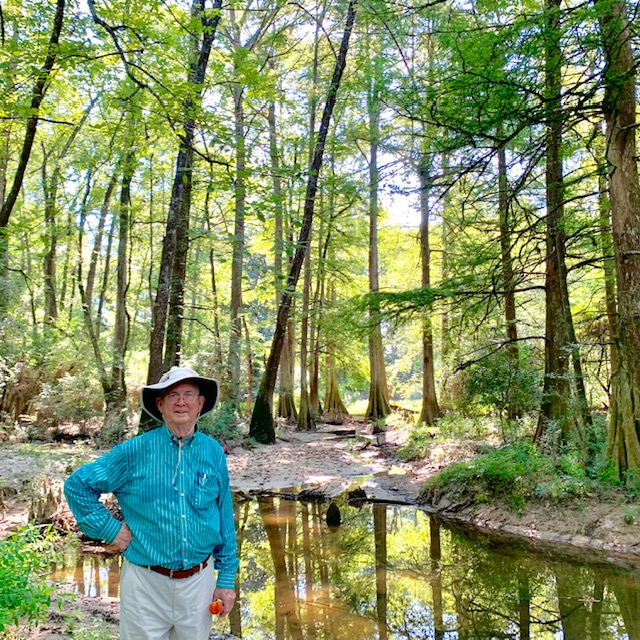
Charles Pickering in Jones County, MS

On May 25, 2001, during the 107th Congress, President George W. Bush nominated Pickering for a seat on the United States Court of Appeals for the Fifth Circuit vacated by Henry Anthony Politz who had taken senior status in 1999, but Pickering's nomination was not acted upon favorably by the Senate Judiciary Committee then under the control of Democratic senator, Patrick Leahy, a Vermont Democrat. Nevertheless, on January 7, 2003, President Bush renominated Pickering to the same position. With the Republicans now in charge of the committee during the 108th Congress, Pickering's nomination was voted out to the full Senate. With no way to stop his confirmation, the Senate Democrats chose to filibuster Pickering in order to prevent him from receiving a straight up-or-down confirmation vote.

Democratic opposition to Pickering was based mainly upon two factors. First, during two hearings before the Senate Judiciary Committee, he maintained a position opposing abortion. Second, he was accused of "glaring racial insensitivity" because of a 1994 hate-crime case in which he decided that 25-year-old Daniel Swan, who had participated with two others in a cross burning, should receive a reduced sentence. The other participants in the cross burning had escaped jail sentences for the crime because of plea bargaining. During the course of testimony, Pickering came to suspect that the Department of Justice Civil Rights Division had made a plea bargain with the wrong defendant. He felt that one of the other defendants, a 17-year-old, was more likely the ringleader of the group. When it came time to sentence Swan, Pickering questioned whether it made sense that the most guilty defendant got off with a misdemeanor and no jail time, while a less guilty defendant would be sentenced to seven and a half years in prison. "The recommendation of the government in this instance is clearly the most egregious instance of disproportionate sentencing recommended by the government in any case pending before this court," Pickering wrote. "The defendant [Swan] clearly had less racial animosity than the juvenile." Pickering sentenced Swan to two years in prison rather than to the seven and a half years originally requested by the Justice Department. The Clinton Justice Department later agreed with Pickering and requested a two-year sentence instead.

Groups that opposed Pickering's confirmation to the Fifth Circuit included the national (but not the Mississippi chapter) of the NAACP, the Southern Christian Leadership Conference, the Congressional Black Caucus, the Leadership Conference on Civil Rights, the Alliance for Justice, the Human Rights Campaign, the Mexican American Legal Defense and Education Fund, the Rainbow/PUSH Coalition, the National Bar Association, the American Association of University Women, the National Women's Law Center, the National Partnership for Women and Families, NARAL Pro-Choice America, the National Women's Political Caucus, the AFL–CIO, the American Federation of School Administrators, American Federation of State, County and Municipal Employees, Union of Needletrades, Industrial and Textile Employees, and the United Steelworkers of America.

However, Pickering's nomination was supported by several past leaders of the NAACP in Mississippi. One of his strongest supporters was former senatorial candidate Charles Evers, brother of slain civil rights leader Medgar Evers.

Senate Republicans failed to overcome a filibuster of Pickering's nomination on October 30, 2003, when he did not receive enough votes to invoke cloture and end debate on his nomination. Frustrated with the obstruction of the Senate Democrats, on January 16, 2004, President George W. Bush gave Pickering a recess appointment to the Fifth Circuit.

In December 2004, unable to overcome the filibuster and with his recess appointment about to end, Pickering announced that he was withdrawing his name from consideration as a nominee to the Fifth Circuit and retiring from the federal bench. He later was replaced as a nominee by Michael B. Wallace, but Wallace's nomination was also eventually withdrawn because of Democratic opposition. Only in 2007 was the seat allowed to be filled with Leslie H. Southwick, who was confirmed.

== Personal life ==
Pickering is married to Margaret Ann Pickering, with whom he has three daughters and one son, former U.S. Representative Charles "Chip" Pickering Jr. They have twenty-one grandchildren and two great-grandchildren.

== See also ==
- George W. Bush judicial appointment controversies

Party political offices
Preceded by Clarke Reed	Chair of the Mississippi Republican Party; 1976–1978	Succeeded by Michael Retzer
Legal offices
Preceded by Walter Nixon	Judge of the United States District Court for the Southern District of Mississippi; 1990–2004	Succeeded by Keith Starrett
Preceded by Henry Anthony Politz	Judge of the United States Court of Appeals for the Fifth Circuit; 2004	Succeeded by Leslie H. Southwick
