= Bill Clinton judicial appointment controversies =

During President Bill Clinton's first and second terms of office, he nominated 24 people for 20 federal appellate judgeships but the nominees were not processed by the Republican-controlled Senate Judiciary Committee. Three of the nominees who were not processed (Christine Arguello, Andre M. Davis and S. Elizabeth Gibson) were nominated after July 1, 2000, the traditional start date of the unofficial Thurmond Rule during a presidential election year. Democrats claim that Senate Republicans of the 106th Congress purposely tried to keep open particular judgeships as a political maneuver to allow a future Republican president to fill them. Of the 20 seats in question, four were eventually filled with different Clinton nominees, fourteen were later filled with Republican nominees by President George W. Bush and two continued to stay open during Bush's presidency. Senator Harry Reid, the Democratic leader of the United States Senate during the 110th Congress, and Senator Patrick Leahy, the Democratic leader of the Senate Judiciary Committee under Reid, repeatedly mentioned the controversy over President Clinton's court of appeals nominees during the controversy involving the confirmation of Republican court of appeals nominees during the last two years of Bush's second term. Republicans claimed that Democrats were refusing to confirm certain longstanding Bush nominees in order to allow a future Democratic president in 2009 to fill those judgeships.

During his presidency, Clinton also nominated 45 people for 42 federal district judgeships who were never confirmed by the United States Senate and successfully nominated 66 people for appellate judgeships.

== List of unsuccessful federal judicial nominations ==
Clinton made 72 nominations for federal judgeships that were not confirmed by the Senate. Of these, one, Ronnie L. White, was rejected by the Senate, 11 were withdrawn by President Clinton, 10 were withdrawn by President George W. Bush, while the other 50 expired at an adjournment of the Senate, including 32 that were pending at the close of the 106th Congress. Eleven of his unsuccessful nominees were subsequently nominated to federal judgeships by other presidents, and all 11 were confirmed.

Nominee	Court	Nomination date	Date of final action	Final action	Subsequent federal judicial nominations	Seat filled by	Ref.
Courts of appeals
Charles Stack	11th Cir.	October 27, 1995	May 13, 1996	withdrawn by Pres. Clinton		Stanley Marcus	
James A. Beaty Jr.	4th Cir.	December 22, 1995	October 21, 1998	returned to the president		James A. Wynn Jr.	
J. Rich Leonard	4th Cir.	December 22, 1995	October 4, 1996	returned to the president		Roger Gregory	
Helene White	6th Cir.	January 7, 1997	March 19, 2001	withdrawn by Pres. Bush	6th Cir. (nominated April 15, 2008, confirmed June 24, 2008)	Richard Allen Griffin	
James Ware	9th Cir.	June 27, 1997	November 7, 1997	withdrawn by Pres. Clinton		Kim McLane Wardlaw	
Jorge Rangel	5th Cir.	July 24, 1997	October 21, 1998	returned to the president		Priscilla Richman	
Robert S. Raymar	3rd Cir.	June 5, 1998	October 21, 1998	returned to the president		Maryanne Trump Barry	
Barry Goode	9th Cir.	June 24, 1998	March 19, 2001	withdrawn by Pres. Bush		Carlos Bea	
Barbara Durham	9th Cir.	January 26, 1999	August 5, 1999	returned to the president		Richard C. Tallman	
Alston Johnson	5th Cir.	April 22, 1999	March 19, 2001	withdrawn by Pres. Bush		Edith Brown Clement	
James E. Duffy Jr.	9th Cir.	June 17, 1999	March 19, 2001	withdrawn by Pres. Bush		Richard Clifton	
Elena Kagan	D.C. Cir.	June 17, 1999	December 15, 2000	returned to the president	SCOTUS (nominated May 10, 2010, confirmed August 5, 2010)	John Roberts	
James A. Wynn Jr.	4th Cir.	August 5, 1999	March 19, 2001	withdrawn by Pres. Bush	4th Cir. (nominated November 4, 2009, confirmed August 5, 2010)	Himself	
Kathleen McCree Lewis	6th Cir.	September 16, 1999	March 19, 2001	withdrawn by Pres. Bush		Susan Bieke Neilson	
Enrique Moreno	5th Cir.	September 16, 1999	March 19, 2001	withdrawn by Pres. Bush		Priscilla Richman	
James Lyons	10th Cir.	September 22, 1999	June 6, 2000	withdrawn by Pres. Clinton		Timothy Tymkovich	
Allen Snyder	D.C. Cir.	September 22, 1999	December 15, 2000	returned to the president		Thomas B. Griffith	
Kent Markus	6th Cir.	February 9, 2000	December 15, 2000	returned to the president		Jeffrey Sutton	
Robert J. Cindrich	3rd Cir.	February 9, 2000	December 15, 2000	returned to the president		D. Brooks Smith	
Bonnie Campbell	8th Cir.	March 2, 2000	March 19, 2001	withdrawn by Pres. Bush		Michael Joseph Melloy	
Stephen Orlofsky	3rd Cir.	May 25, 2000	December 15, 2000	returned to the president		Michael Chertoff	
Roger Gregory (Note: Received a recess appointment on December 27, 2000.)	4th Cir.	June 30, 2000	March 19, 2001	withdrawn by Pres. Bush	4th Cir. (nominated May 9, 2001, confirmed July 20, 2001)	Himself	
Christine Arguello	10th Cir.	July 27, 2000	December 15, 2000	returned to the president	D. Colo. (nominated July 10, 2008, confirmed September 26, 2008)	Timothy Tymkovich	
Andre M. Davis	4th Cir.	October 6, 2000	December 15, 2000	returned to the president	4th Cir. (nominated April 2, 2009, confirmed November 9, 2009)	Himself	
S. Elizabeth Gibson	4th Cir.	October 26, 2000	December 15, 2000	returned to the president		Allyson K. Duncan	
District courts
Theodore Klein	S.D. Fla.	November 1, 1993	November 14, 1994	returned to the president		Donald M. Middlebrooks	
R. Samuel Paz	C.D. Cal.	March 24, 1994	November 14, 1994	returned to the president		George H. King	
Judith D. McConnell	S.D. Cal.	August 5, 1994	November 14, 1994	returned to the president		Barry Ted Moskowitz	
John R. Tait	D. Idaho	August 25, 1994	November 14, 1994	returned to the president		B. Lynn Winmill	
John D. Snodgrass	N.D. Ala.	September 22, 1994	September 5, 1995	withdrawn by Pres. Clinton		Charles Lynwood Smith Jr.	
Patrick J. Toole Jr.	M.D. Pa.	September 26, 1994	November 14, 1994	returned to the president		A. Richard Caputo	
Wenona Y. Whitfield	S.D. Ill.	March 23, 1995	October 4, 1996	returned to the president		David R. Herndon	
Leland M. Shurin	W.D. Mo.	April 4, 1995	September 5, 1995	withdrawn by Pres. Clinton		Gary A. Fenner	
John H. Bingler Jr.	W.D. Pa.	July 21, 1995	February 12, 1998	withdrawn by Pres. Clinton		Arthur J. Schwab	
Bruce W. Greer	S.D. Fla.	August 1, 1995	May 13, 1996	withdrawn by Pres. Clinton		Donald M. Middlebrooks	
Clarence J. Sundram	N.D.N.Y.	September 29, 1995	October 21, 1998	returned to the president		David N. Hurd	
Sue E. Myerscough	C.D. Ill.	October 11, 1995	October 4, 1996	returned to the president	C.D. Ill. (nominated June 17, 2010, confirmed March 7, 2011)	Michael P. McCuskey	
Cheryl B. Wattley	N.D. Tex.	December 12, 1995	October 4, 1996	returned to the president		Sam A. Lindsay	
Michael D. Schattman	N.D. Tex.	December 19, 1995	July 31, 1998	withdrawn by Pres. Clinton		Barbara M. Lynn	
Anabelle Rodriguez	D.P.R.	January 26, 1996	October 21, 1998	returned to the president		Jay A. García-Gregory	
Lynne R. Lasry	S.D. Cal.	February 12, 1997	February 12, 1998	withdrawn by Pres. Clinton		Thomas J. Whelan	
Ronnie L. White	E.D. Mo.	June 26, 1997	October 5, 1999	rejected by the Senate	E.D. Mo. (nominated November 7, 2013, confirmed July 16, 2014)	Henry Autrey	
Frederica Massiah-Jackson	E.D. Pa.	July 31, 1997	March 16, 1998	withdrawn by Pres. Clinton		Petrese B. Tucker	
Jeffrey D. Colman	N.D. Ill.	July 31, 1997	October 21, 1998	returned to the president		Ronald A. Guzman	
James W. Klein	D.D.C.	January 27, 1998	December 15, 2000	returned to the president		John D. Bates	
Robert A. Freedberg	E.D. Pa.	April 23, 1998	October 21, 1998	returned to the president		Petrese B. Tucker	
Lynette Norton	W.D. Pa.	April 29, 1998	December 15, 2000	returned to the president		Arthur J. Schwab	
Legrome D. Davis	E.D. Pa.	July 30, 1998	December 15, 2000	returned to the president	E.D. Pa. (nominated January 23, 2002, confirmed April 18, 2022)	Himself	
J. Rich Leonard	E.D.N.C.	March 24, 1999	December 15, 2000	returned to the president		James C. Dever III	
Frank H. McCarthy	N.D. Okla.	April 30, 1999	December 15, 2000	returned to the president		Claire Eagan	
Patricia A. Coan	D. Colo.	May 27, 1999	December 15, 2000	returned to the president		Robert E. Blackburn	
Dolly Gee	C.D. Cal.	May 27, 1999	December 15, 2000	returned to the president	C.D. Cal. (nominated August 6, 2009, confirmed December 24, 2009)	John F. Walter	
Fredric D. Woocher	C.D. Cal.	May 27, 1999	December 15, 2000	returned to the president		Percy Anderson	
Gail S. Tusan	N.D. Ga.	August 3, 1999	March 27, 2000	withdrawn by Pres. Clinton		Beverly B. Martin	
Steven D. Bell	N.D. Ohio	August 5, 1999	December 15, 2000	returned to the president		John R. Adams	
Rhonda C. Fields	D.D.C.	November 17, 1999	December 15, 2000	returned to the president		Reggie Walton	
S. David Fineman	E.D. Pa.	March 9, 2000	December 15, 2000	returned to the president		Cynthia M. Rufe	
Linda B. Riegle	D. Nev.	April 25, 2000	December 15, 2000	returned to the president		Larry R. Hicks	
Ricardo Morado	S.D. Tex.	May 11, 2000	December 15, 2000	returned to the president		Andrew Hanen	
K. Gary Sebelius	D. Kan.	June 6, 2000	December 15, 2000	returned to the president		Julie A. Robinson	
Kenneth O. Simon	N.D. Ala.	June 6, 2000	December 15, 2000	returned to the president		Karon O. Bowdre	
John S. W. Lim	D. Haw.	June 8, 2000	December 15, 2000	returned to the president		John Michael Seabright	
David S. Cercone	W.D. Pa.	July 27, 2000	December 15, 2000	returned to the president	W.D. Pa. (nominated March 21, 2002, confirmed August 1, 2002)	vacancy nullified	
Harry Litman	W.D. Pa.	July 27, 2000	December 15, 2000	returned to the president		Joy Flowers Conti	
Valerie K. Couch	W.D. Okla.	September 7, 2000	December 15, 2000	returned to the president		Stephen P. Friot	
Marian McClure Johnston	E.D. Cal.	September 7, 2000	December 15, 2000	returned to the president		Morrison C. England Jr.	
Steven E. Achelpohl	D. Neb.	September 12, 2000	December 15, 2000	returned to the president		Laurie Smith Camp	
Richard W. Anderson	D. Mont.	September 13, 2000	December 15, 2000	returned to the president		Sam E. Haddon	
Stephen B. Lieberman	E.D. Pa.	September 14, 2000	December 15, 2000	returned to the president		Timothy J. Savage	
Melvin C. Hall	W.D. Okla.	October 3, 2000	December 15, 2000	returned to the president		Joe L. Heaton	
Court of International Trade
Jeffrey G. Stark	Intl. Trade	April 29, 1998	October 21, 1998	returned to the president		Richard K. Eaton	
Article I courts
Sarah L. Wilson (Note: Received a recess appointment on January 19, 2001.)	Fed. Cl.	January 3, 2001	March 19, 2001	withdrawn by Pres. Bush		Mary Ellen Coster Williams	

== Failed appellate nominees ==
- United States Court of Appeals for the Third Circuit
  - Robert Raymar (of New Jersey), to seat vacated by H. Lee Sarokin - Judgeship later filled by Clinton nominee Maryanne Trump Barry.
  - Stephen Orlofsky (of New Jersey), to seat vacated by Morton Ira Greenberg - Judgeship later filled by Bush nominee Michael Chertoff.
  - Robert J. Cindrich (of Pennsylvania), to seat vacated by Timothy K. Lewis - Judgeship later filled by Bush nominee D. Brooks Smith.
- United States Court of Appeals for the Fourth Circuit
  - Andre M. Davis (of Maryland), to seat vacated by Francis D. Murnaghan, Jr. - Davis was nominated on October 6, 2000, during the final months of the Clinton presidency. The Senate took no action on the nomination, which was returned to the President on December 15, 2000. After Clinton's unsuccessful nomination of Davis, President George W. Bush unsuccessfully nominated Claude Allen and Rod J. Rosenstein to succeed Judge Murnaghan. Davis was renominated to the same seat by President Barack Obama in April 2009 and confirmed that year in November.
  - James A. Beaty, Jr. (of North Carolina), to seat vacated by James Dickson Phillips, Jr. - Judgeship was eventually filled by Obama nominee Albert Diaz of North Carolina.
  - James Andrew Wynn (of North Carolina), to seat vacated by James Dickson Phillips, Jr. - Judgeship never filled by any Bush nominee; Wynn was renominated by President Barack Obama to the same seat in November 2009 and was confirmed by the Senate in August 2010.
  - S. Elizabeth Gibson (of North Carolina), to seat vacated by Samuel James Ervin III - Gibson was nominated on October 26, 2000, during the final months of the Clinton presidency. The Senate took no action on the nomination, which was returned to the President on December 15, 2000. The judgeship was later filled by Bush nominee Allyson Kay Duncan.
  - J. Rich Leonard (of North Carolina), to newly created seat - Judgeship later filled by Clinton nominee Roger Gregory (of Virginia) after being renominated by Bush in 2001.
- United States Court of Appeals for the Fifth Circuit
  - Alston Johnson (of Louisiana), to seat vacated by John Malcolm Duhé, Jr. - Judgeship later filled by Bush nominee Edith Brown Clement.
  - Jorge Rangel (of Texas), to seat vacated by William Lockhart Garwood - Judgeship later filled by Bush nominee Priscilla Owen.
  - Enrique Moreno (of Texas), to seat vacated by William Lockhart Garwood - Judgeship later filled by Bush nominee Priscilla Owen.
- United States Court of Appeals for the Sixth Circuit
  - Helene White (of Michigan), to seat vacated by Damon Keith - Judgeship later filled by Bush nominee Richard A. Griffin; White was eventually confirmed to the Sixth Circuit when renominated by Bush in 2008.
  - Kathleen McCree Lewis (of Michigan), to seat vacated by Cornelia Groefsema Kennedy - Judgeship later filled by Bush nominee Susan Bieke Neilson.
  - Kent Markus (of Ohio), to seat vacated by David Aldrich Nelson - Judgeship later filled by Bush nominee Jeffrey S. Sutton.
- United States Court of Appeals for the Eighth Circuit
  - Bonnie Campbell (of Iowa), to seat vacated by George Gardner Fagg - Judgeship later filled by Bush nominee Michael J. Melloy.
- United States Court of Appeals for the Ninth Circuit
  - James Ware (of California), to seat vacated by J. Clifford Wallace - Judgeship later filled by Clinton nominee Kim McLane Wardlaw.
  - Barry Goode (of California), to seat vacated by Charles E. Wiggins - Judgeship later filled by Bush nominee Carlos Bea.
  - James E. Duffy, Jr. (of Hawaii), to seat vacated by Cynthia Holcomb Hall (of California) - Judgeship later filled by Bush nominee Richard Clifton (of Hawaii).
- United States Court of Appeals for the Tenth Circuit
  - James Lyons (of Colorado), to seat vacated by John Carbone Porfilio - Lyons was nominated on September 22, 1999. Both senators from Colorado, Ben Nighthorse Campbell and Wayne Allard, were members of the Republican Party. Senator Campbell was supportive of the Lyons nomination, but Allard withheld his support and described Lyons as a "political operative" due to his representation of the Clintons during Whitewater. Lyons' nomination was withdrawn on June 6, 2000. Clinton subsequently nominated Christine Arguello, also unsuccessfully. The judgeship was later filled by Bush nominee Timothy M. Tymkovich.
  - Christine Arguello (of Colorado), to seat vacated by John Carbone Porfilio - Arguello was nominated on July 27, 2000, shortly after Clinton withdrew his earlier nomination of James Lyons. The Senate took no action on the nomination, which was returned to the President on December 15, 2000. The judgeship was later filled by Bush nominee Timothy M. Tymkovich. Arguello was eventually confirmed to a district court seat when nominated by Bush in 2008.
- United States Court of Appeals for the Eleventh Circuit
  - Charles "Bud" Stack (of Florida), to seat vacated by Peter T. Fay - Judgeship later filled by Clinton nominee Stanley Marcus.
- United States Court of Appeals for the District of Columbia
  - Elena Kagan (of the District of Columbia), to seat vacated by James L. Buckley - Judgeship later filled by Bush nominee John G. Roberts, Jr.
  - Allen Snyder (of Maryland), to seat vacated by Patricia Wald - Judgeship later filled by Bush nominee Thomas B. Griffith.

== Others who were nominated or considered for nomination to federal appellate courts ==
While not a controversy, one other Clinton appellate court nominee, Barbara Durham, withdrew before being confirmed, but not because of Republican opposition. Rather, Durham, a conservative jurist whom Clinton nominated to the United States Court of Appeals for the Ninth Circuit as part of a deal with then-Washington Sen. Slade Gorton, withdrew because of illness. Clinton instead nominated Republican lawyer Richard Tallman of Seattle to the seat to which he had nominated Durham, and Tallman was confirmed in 2000.

While he was never formally nominated to the United States Court of Appeals for the District of Columbia Circuit, Peter Edelman was strongly considered by Clinton for a seat on that appeals court in late 1994. After the influential Republican member of the U.S. Senate Judiciary Committee Sen. Orrin Hatch informed Clinton that he had intended to oppose Edelman's nomination, Clinton dropped plans to nominate Edelman to the D.C. Circuit, choosing Merrick Garland instead.

In its November 1997 issue, the American Spectator reported that President Clinton had intended to nominate Teresa Wynn Roseborough in 1997 to a vacant seat on the United States Court of Appeals for the Eleventh Circuit after Judge Phyllis A. Kravitch took senior status. The American Spectator noted, however, that Sen. Orrin Hatch, the then-chairman of the U.S. Senate Judiciary Committee, had "balked" at the idea of Roseborough, who was one of four finalists (the others were Leah Ward Sears, Clarence Cooper and Frank M. Hull) and had "suggested that a more moderate Clinton-appointed U.S. district judge, Frank Hull, would have clear sailing." Indeed, Frank M. Hull was confirmed by the Senate in a 96-0 vote in September 1997.

== Failed district court nominees ==
During his presidency, Clinton nominated 45 people for 42 different federal district judgeships to federal district courts who were never confirmed by the U.S. Senate. Like the appellate court nominations mentioned above, many of these nominees were blocked by Republicans either in the Senate Judiciary Committee, which was controlled by Republicans for six of the eight years of Clinton’s presidency, or on the Senate floor, where one nominee, Ronnie L. White, was defeated by senators.

Of the 42 federal district judgeship vacancies in question, 17 eventually were filled with different Clinton nominees, 24 were filled by nominees of President George W. Bush and one never ended up becoming vacant because the district judge holding it never received confirmation to be elevated to an appellate court. Of Clinton's 45 failed district court nominees, four, Legrome D. Davis, David S. Cercone, Dolly M. Gee and Sue E. Myerscough, subsequently were nominated by Presidents George W. Bush and Barack Obama to federal district judgeships and then confirmed by the Senate.

The failed Clinton district court nominees:

- United States District Court for the District of Puerto Rico
  - Anabelle Rodriguez (judgeship later filled by Clinton nominee Jay A. García-Gregory)
- United States District Court for the Northern District of New York
  - Clarence J. Sundram (judgeship later filled by Clinton nominee David N. Hurd)
- United States District Court for the Eastern District of Pennsylvania
  - Frederica Massiah-Jackson, followed by Robert A. Freedberg (judgeship later filled by Clinton nominee Petrese B. Tucker)
  - Legrome D. Davis (judgeship later filled by Davis himself, when he was renominated by George W. Bush in 2002 and then confirmed by the Senate)
  - S. David Fineman (judgeship later filled by Bush nominee Cynthia M. Rufe)
  - Stephen B. Lieberman (judgeship later filled by Bush nominee Timothy J. Savage)
- United States District Court for the Middle District of Pennsylvania
  - Patrick J. Toole (judgeship later filled by Clinton nominee A. Richard Caputo)
- United States District Court for the Western District of Pennsylvania
  - John H. Bingler, Jr., followed by Lynette Norton (judgeship later filled by Bush nominee Arthur J. Schwab)
  - David S. Cercone (judgeship was to become vacant when Judge Robert J. Cindrich was elevated to the United States Court of Appeals for the Third Circuit but Cindrich never was confirmed to that post before Clinton's presidency ended; Cercone later was nominated to a different seat in the Western District by Bush and then confirmed by the Senate)
  - Harry Litman (judgeship later filled by Bush nominee Joy Flowers Conti)
- United States District Court for the Eastern District of North Carolina
  - J. Rich Leonard (judgeship later filled by Bush nominee James C. Dever III)
- United States District Court for the Northern District of Texas
  - Cheryl B. Wattley (judgeship later filled by Clinton nominee Sam A. Lindsay)
  - Michael D. Schattman (judgeship later filled by Clinton nominee Barbara M. Lynn)
- United States District Court for the Southern District of Texas
  - Ricardo Morado (judgeship later filled by Bush nominee Andrew S. Hanen)
- United States District Court for the Northern District of Ohio
  - Steven D. Bell (judgeship later filled by Bush nominee John R. Adams)
- United States District Court for the Central District of Illinois
  - Sue E. Myerscough (judgeship later filled by Clinton nominee Michael P. McCuskey) (Myerscough later renominated by President Obama to a different seat on the same court and confirmed in 2011)
- United States District Court for the Northern District of Illinois
  - Jeffrey D. Colman (judgeship later filled by Clinton nominee Ronald A. Guzman)
- United States District Court for the Southern District of Illinois
  - Wenona Y. Whitfield (judgeship later filled by Clinton nominee David R. Herndon)
- United States District Court for the Eastern District of Missouri
  - Ronnie L. White (Nomination rejected by the Senate) (judgeship later filled by Bush nominee Henry Autrey; White later was nominated and confirmed to a different seat on the Eastern District by Obama)
- United States District Court for the Western District of Missouri
  - Leland M. Shurin (judgeship later filled by Clinton nominee Gary A. Fenner)
- United States District Court for the District of Nebraska
  - Steven E. Achelpohl (judgeship later filled by Bush nominee Laurie Smith Camp)
- United States District Court for the Central District of California
  - R. Samuel Paz (judgeship later filled by Clinton nominee George H. King)
  - Dolly M. Gee (judgeship later filled by Bush nominee John F. Walter; Gee later was nominated and confirmed to a different seat on the Central District by Obama)
  - Fredric D. Woocher (judgeship later filled by Bush nominee Percy Anderson)
- United States District Court for the Eastern District of California
  - Marian M. Johnston (judgeship later filled by Bush nominee Morrison C. England Jr.)
- United States District Court for the Southern District of California
  - Judith D. McConnell (judgeship later filled by Clinton nominee Barry Ted Moskowitz)
  - Lynne R. Lasry (judgeship later filled by Clinton nominee Thomas J. Whelan)
- United States District Court for the District of Hawaii
  - John S. W. Lim (judgeship later filled by Bush nominee John Michael Seabright)
- United States District Court for the District of Idaho
  - John R. Tait (judgeship later filled by Clinton nominee Lynn Winmill)
- United States District Court for the District of Montana
  - Richard W. Anderson (judgeship later filled by Bush nominee Sam E. Haddon)
- United States District Court for the District of Nevada
  - Linda B. Riegle (judgeship later filled by Bush nominee Larry R. Hicks)
- United States District Court for the District of Colorado
  - Patricia A. Coan (judgeship later filled by Bush nominee Robert E. Blackburn)
- United States District Court for the District of Kansas
  - K. Gary Sebelius (judgeship later filled by Bush nominee Julie A. Robinson)
- United States District Court for the Northern District of Oklahoma
  - Frank H. McCarthy (judgeship later filled by Bush nominee Claire Eagan)
- United States District Court for the Western District of Oklahoma
  - Valerie K. Couch (judgeship later filled by Bush nominee Stephen P. Friot)
  - Melvin C. Hall (judgeship later filled by Bush nominee Joe L. Heaton)
- United States District Court for the Northern District of Alabama
  - John D. Snodgrass (judgeship later filled by Clinton nominee Charles Lynwood Smith Jr.)
  - Kenneth O. Simon (judgeship later filled by Bush nominee Karon O. Bowdre)
- United States District Court for the Southern District of Florida
  - Theodore Klein, followed by Bruce W. Greer (judgeship later filled by Clinton nominee Donald M. Middlebrooks)
- United States District Court for the Northern District of Georgia
  - Gail S. Tusan (judgeship later filled by Clinton nominee Beverly B. Martin)
- United States District Court for the District of Columbia
  - James W. Klein (judgeship later filled by Bush nominee John D. Bates)
  - Rhonda C. Fields (judgeship later filled by Bush nominee Reggie Walton)

== See also ==
- United States federal judge
- Judicial appointment history for United States federal courts
- Deaths of United States federal judges in active service
