= David McKeague =

American judge (born 1946)

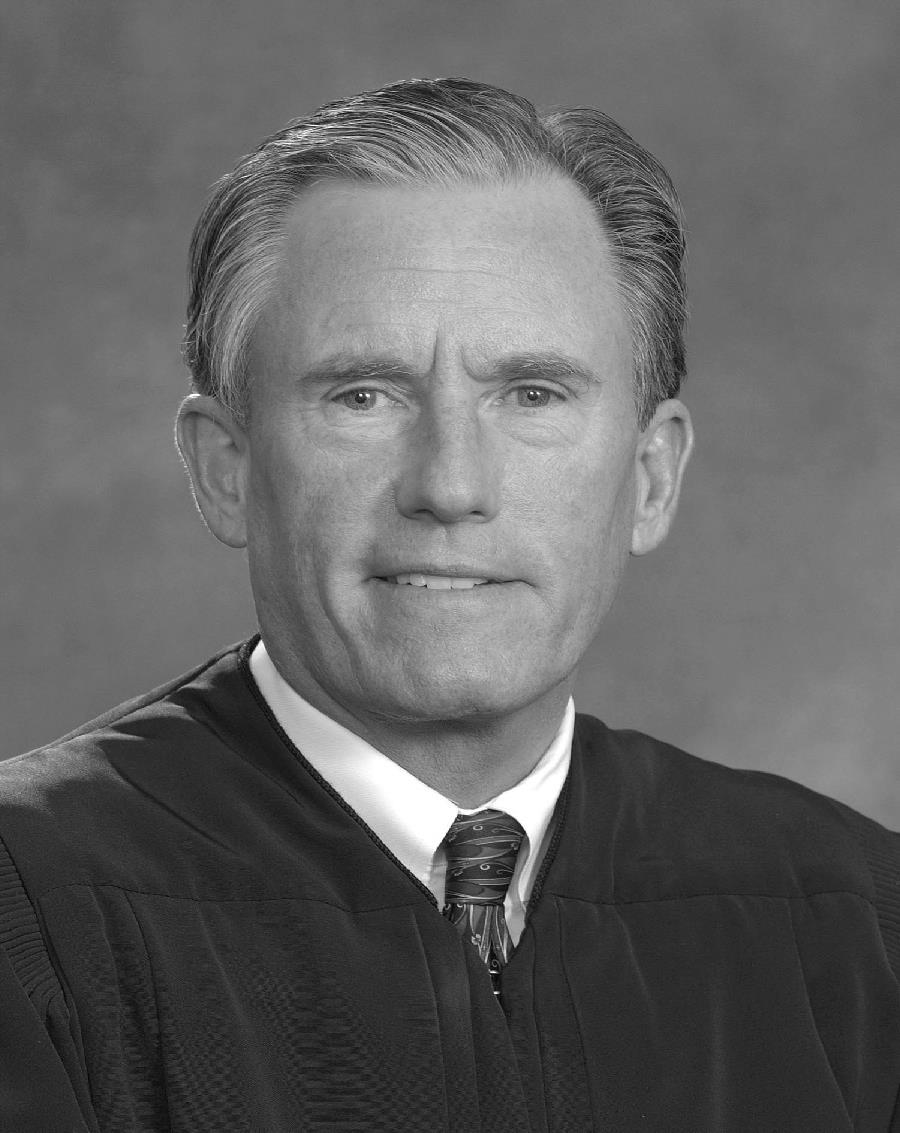

Senior Judge of the United States Court of Appeals for the Sixth Circuit
- Incumbent
- Assumed office November 1, 2017

Judge of the United States Court of Appeals for the Sixth Circuit
- In office June 10, 2005 – November 1, 2017
- Appointed by: George W. Bush
- Preceded by: Richard Fred Suhrheinrich
- Succeeded by: Joan Larsen

Judge of the United States District Court for the Western District of Michigan
- In office February 10, 1992 – June 13, 2005
- Appointed by: George H. W. Bush
- Preceded by: Douglas Woodruff Hillman
- Succeeded by: Janet T. Neff

Personal details
- Born: David William McKeague; 1946 (age 79–80) Pittsburgh, Pennsylvania, U.S.
- Education: University of Michigan (BA, JD)

David William McKeague (born 1946) is a senior United States circuit judge of the United States Court of Appeals for the Sixth Circuit.

== Education and career ==
McKeague received a Bachelor of Arts degree from the University of Michigan in 1968, and his Juris Doctor from the University of Michigan Law School in 1971. He served in private practice in Lansing, Michigan until 1992. He was also an adjunct professor at Michigan State University College of Law from 1998 to 2013.

== Federal judicial service ==
=== District Court service ===
McKeague was nominated by President George H. W. Bush on September 11, 1991, to a seat on the United States District Court for the Western District of Michigan vacated by Judge Douglas Woodruff Hillman. He was confirmed by the United States Senate on February 6, 1992, and received commission on February 10, 1992. His service terminated on June 13, 2005, due to elevation to the court of appeals.

=== Court of appeals service ===
On November 8, 2001, McKeague was nominated by President George W. Bush to a seat on the United States Court of Appeals for the Sixth Circuit vacated by the Judge Richard Fred Suhrheinrich, who assumed senior status on August 15, 2001. On the same day, Bush also nominated Henry Saad and Susan Bieke Neilson to Michigan seats on the Sixth Circuit. On June 26, 2002, Bush nominated Richard Allen Griffin to a fourth Michigan seat on the Sixth Circuit. During the Democrat-controlled 107th Congress, all four nominations were stalled in the Senate Judiciary Committee by then chairman, Senator Patrick Leahy, D-VT.

In the 2002 midterm congressional elections, the Republicans regained control of the Senate. During the new 108th Congress, Senator Orrin Hatch (R-UT), the new Republican chairman of the Senate Judiciary Committee began to process the previously blocked four nominees. In March 2003, Michigan's two Democratic senators, Carl Levin and Debbie Stabenow announced that they would blue-slip all Bush judicial nominees from Michigan because Bush refused to renominate Helene White and Kathleen McCree Lewis, two Michigan nominees to the Sixth Circuit whose nominations the Senate Republicans had refused to process during President Bill Clinton's second term. Helene White at the time was married to Levin's cousin.

Overriding Levin and Stabenow, Hatch gave Saad, McKeague and Griffin hearings, and advanced the three nominees out of committee. Furious, Levin and Stabenow convinced their caucus to filibuster the three to prevent them from having confirmation votes.

Senate Republicans increased their numbers in the 109th Congress. Tensions between the Republicans and Democrats rose dramatically as the Republicans sought to break the filibusters of ten Bush court of appeals nominees (including Saad, McKeague and Griffin) by using the nuclear option. In order to defuse the explosive situation concerning the use of the nuclear option and Democrats' obstruction of President Bush's judicial nominations, fourteen moderate Republican and Democratic senators called the Gang of 14 joined together to forge an agreement to guarantee certain filibustered nominations up or down votes. Henry Saad and William Myers, however, were expressly excluded from the deal.

Following the 2005 Gang of 14 compromise, McKeague was given a vote along with fellow Sixth Circuit nominee Richard Allen Griffin. He was confirmed by the United States Senate on June 9, 2005 by a 96–0 vote, with both Levin and Stabenow ultimately voted in favor of McKeague's nomination. He received his commission on June 10, 2005.

In April 2017, McKeague announced his plan to assume senior status upon confirmation of his successor.

On November 1, 2017, he assumed senior status after the confirmation of Joan Larsen as his successor.

== See also ==
- Bill Clinton judicial appointment controversies
- George W. Bush judicial appointment controversies
- filibuster
- cloture
- nuclear option
- Gang of 14

Legal offices
Preceded by Douglas Woodruff Hillman	Judge of the United States District Court for the Western District of Michigan; 1992–2005	Succeeded by Janet T. Neff
Preceded by Richard Fred Suhrheinrich	Judge of the United States Court of Appeals for the Sixth Circuit; 2005–2017	Succeeded by Joan Larsen
