= Elizabeth Gibson =

Elizabeth Gibson may refer to:

- Elizabeth Gibson (nurse) (fl. 1862), Union nurse during the American Civil War
- Elizabeth Chamberlain Gibson (1830–1916), Methodist missionary in China
- Bessie Gibson (1868–1961), Australian artist
- S. Elizabeth Gibson (1950— ), American law professor
