= Judge Leonard =

Judge Leonard may refer to:

- J. Rich Leonard (born 1949), judge of the United States Bankruptcy Court for the Eastern District of North Carolina
- Timothy D. Leonard (1940–2026), judge of the United States District Court for the Western District of Oklahoma

== See also ==
- Joan A. Lenard (born 1952), judge of the United States District Court for the Southern District of Florida
