= Barry Goode =

American lawyer

Barry P. Goode (born April 11, 1948) is a judge in Contra Costa County, California, and a former federal judicial nominee to the U.S. Court of Appeals for the Ninth Circuit.

== Early life and education ==
A New York native, Goode earned a bachelor's degree magna cum laude and Phi Beta Kappa from Kenyon College in 1969. He earned a Juris Doctor degree cum laude from Harvard Law School in 1972.

== Professional career ==
Goode's first job out of law school was as a special assistant to US Senator Adlai Stevenson III of Illinois, from 1972 to 1974, when Goode then joined the San Francisco law firm McCutchen, Doyle, Brown & Enersen (now Bingham McCutchen), where he rose to become a partner. Throughout his 27-year career at the firm, he specialized in representing large corporations in environmental litigation. He also worked as an adjunct instructor of environmental law at the University of San Francisco. Goode left the firm in 2001 to join California state government.

== Nomination to Ninth Circuit ==
US President Bill Clinton nominated Goode to the Ninth Circuit on June 24, 1998, to replace Charles Edward Wiggins, who had taken senior status. With the US Senate under Republican control until the end of the Clinton administration, Goode's nomination languished, with no hearing scheduled or US Senate Judiciary Committee vote for him. Despite support for him from both of California's senators, Dianne Feinstein and Barbara Boxer, Goode's nomination was held up by one anonymous senator, who had placed a hold on his nomination for unexplained reasons. Clinton renominated Goode on January 26, 1999 and again on January 3, 2001.

On March 19, 2001, however, US President George W. Bush withdrew 62 executive and judicial nominations, including Goode's made by Clinton in his final days as president. Goode's nearly three-year nomination remains the fourth-longest federal appeals-court judicial nominations that was never given a full Senate vote, behind those of Helene White, Henry Saad, and Terrence Boyle.

In April 2003, Bush nominated Carlos Bea to the Ninth Circuit seat to which Goode had been nominated. Bea was confirmed by the US Senate in September 2003.

== Work for California governor ==
On February 1, 2001, California Governor Gray Davis named Goode as his secretary of legal affairs. Goode called the post an "important job" in a newspaper interview with the Metropolitan News-Enterprise that was published on February 2, 2001. "I'm the kind of person who looks forward, not backward," he told the paper in reference to his expired federal judicial nomination.

During his time working for Davis, Goode was the point person during two controversies. One involved a $95 million software contract with Oracle Corporation and Northrop Grumman that state officials rescinded in 2002 after critics charged that it would cost the state millions of dollars, instead of generating the promised $100 million in savings. The other controversy involved power generator Duke Energy, which was accused of gouging California in 2001.

== Appointment to Contra County Superior Court ==
On November 11, 2003, just days before he left office after a recall vote, Davis appointed Goode to serve on the Contra Costa County Superior Court. Goode's courtroom is in Martinez, California, the seat of Contra Costa County.

== Personal life ==
Goode lives in California and has taught environmental law at the University of San Francisco School of Law.

== See also ==
- Bill Clinton judicial appointment controversies
