= Richard Allen Griffin =

American judge (born 1952)

Richard Griffin
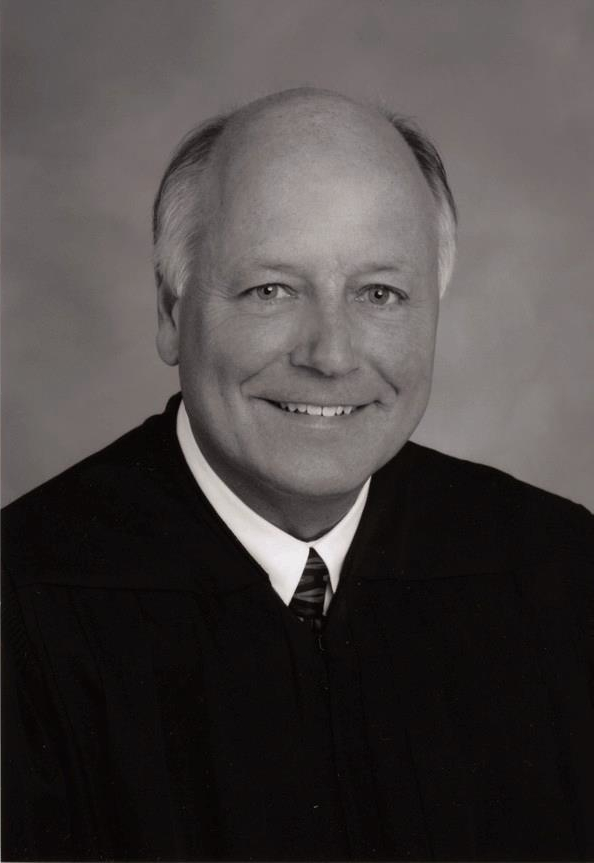

Judge of the United States Court of Appeals for the Sixth Circuit
- Incumbent
- Assumed office June 10, 2005
- Appointed by: George W. Bush
- Preceded by: Damon Keith

Personal details
- Born: Richard Allen Griffin; 1952 (age 72–73) Traverse City, Michigan, U.S.
- Political party: Republican
- Education: Western Michigan University (BA); University of Michigan (JD)

Richard Allen Griffin (born 1952) is a United States circuit judge of the United States Court of Appeals for the Sixth Circuit. Previously, he was a judge on the Michigan Court of Appeals.

Griffin was first nominated to the United States Court of Appeals for the 6th Circuit by President George W. Bush on June 26, 2002, to a seat vacated by Judge Damon Keith as Keith assumed senior status. He was confirmed by the United States Senate on June 9, 2005, and received commission on June 10, 2005.

== Background ==
Griffin, born in Traverse City, Michigan, is the son of former United States Senator Robert P. Griffin. He received a Bachelor of Arts degree magna cum laude from Western Michigan University in 1971 and a Juris Doctor from the University of Michigan Law School in 1977.

Beginning in 1989, he served as a judge on the Michigan Court of Appeals (Third District). During part of that time his father was a Justice of the Michigan Supreme Court.

=== Federal judicial service ===
On June 26, 2002, Bush nominated Griffin to a Michigan seat on the United States Court of Appeals for the Sixth Circuit vacated by Damon Keith, who assumed senior status in 1995. Previously, on November 8, 2001, President Bush had nominated Henry Saad, David McKeague and Susan Bieke Neilson to three other Michigan seats on the Sixth Circuit. During the Democratic-controlled 107th Congress, all four nominations were stalled in the Senate Judiciary Committee by then chairman, Senator Patrick Leahy, D-VT. In its assessment of his nomination, the Independent Judiciary project of the liberal group Alliance for Justice described Griffin as a "deeply conservative jurist".

In the 2002 midterm congressional elections, the Republicans regained control of the Senate. During the new 108th Congress, Senator Orrin Hatch, R-UT, the new Republican chairman of the Senate Judiciary Committee began to process the previously blocked four nominees. In March 2003, Michigan's two Democratic senators, Carl Levin (who defeated Griffin's father, Robert P. Griffin, in his bid for re-election in 1978) and Debbie Stabenow announced that they would blue-slip all Bush judicial nominees from Michigan because Bush refused to renominate Helene White and Kathleen McCree Lewis, two Michigan nominees to the Sixth Circuit whose nominations the Senate Republicans had refused to process during President Bill Clinton's second term. Helene White at the time was married to Levin's cousin.

Contrary to Levin's and Stabenow's wishes, Hatch gave Saad, McKeague and Griffin committee hearings, and passed the three nominees out of committee. Furious, Levin and Stabenow convinced their caucus to filibuster the three in order to prevent them from having confirmation votes.

Senate Republicans increased their numbers in the 109th Congress. Tensions between the Republicans and Democrats rose dramatically as the Republicans, unable to end debate through cloture, considered breaking the filibusters of ten Bush court of appeals nominees (including Saad, McKeague and Griffin) by using the nuclear option. In order to defuse the volatile situation, fourteen moderate Republican and Democratic senators called the Gang of 14 joined together to forge an agreement to guarantee certain filibustered nominations up or down votes. Henry Saad and William Myers, however, were expressly excluded from the deal.

As part of the Gang of 14 Deal, Griffin was eventually confirmed on June 9, 2005 by a 95–0 vote. In the end, both Levin and Stabenow voted in favor of his confirmation. McKeague was confirmed on the same day. He received his commission on June 10, 2005.

== See also ==
- Bill Clinton judicial appointment controversies
- George W. Bush judicial appointment controversies

Legal offices
Preceded by Damon Keith	Judge of the United States Court of Appeals for the Sixth Circuit; 2005–present	Incumbent
