= James Lyons (lawyer) =

American lawyer (born 1947)

James M. Lyons (born January 6, 1947) is an attorney at law in Denver, Colorado.

== Early life and education ==
James Lyons was born in Joliet, Illinois, on January 6, 1947, to Judge Michael Lyons and Helen Glass Lyons. He is the oldest of six children. He attended parochial elementary school and Joliet Catholic High School, graduating in 1964. He earned a bachelor's degree in political science from the College of the Holy Cross in Worcester, Massachusetts, in 1968. He earned a J.D. degree in 1971 from DePaul University College of Law in Chicago, where he served as associate editor of the DePaul Law Review.

== Professional career ==
Lyons joined the Denver law firm of Rothgerber Appel & Powers, now Womble Bond Dickinson US LLP (formerly Rothgerber Johnson and Lyons LLP and later Lewis Roca Rothgerber LLP), in September 1971. His initial practice involved financial institutions and civil litigation. He became a partner of the firm in 1974 and his name was added to the firm in 1999. His practice includes complex litigation, mediation and arbitration, and international business transactions. Recent clients include The Anschutz Corporation, the City and County of Denver, Colorado State University, and the Board of Directors of Qwest Communications International, Inc.

Lyons is admitted to state courts in Illinois and Colorado, and to various federal courts, including the Supreme Court of the United States. He served as President of the Faculty of Federal Advocates (FFA) of the United States District Court for the District of Colorado. He also served as Chairman of the United States Magistrate Judge Merit Selection Panel for the United States District Court for the District of Colorado.

Lyons is a Fellow in the American College of Trial Lawyers. Membership is by invitation and limited to fewer than one percent of active trial lawyers in the United States. He has served as ACTL Colorado State Chairman. He is a Fellow of the International Academy of Trial Lawyers. (Membership is by invitation only and is limited to 500 lawyers in the world.) He is also a member of the American Board of Trial Advocates (ABOTA). He has been listed in Best Lawyers in America since its inception (Commercial Litigation and Bet-the-Company Litigation). Lyons has been listed in the first band of commercial litigators in every edition of Chambers USA.

Lyons is listed in Colorado Super Lawyers. For four years (2006, 2007, 2008 and 2012) he was voted by his peers the number one Super Lawyer in Colorado. He is the subject of a feature article in the April 2007 Colorado Super Lawyer entitled "The Gold Standard – How Jim Lyons Helped Bring Peace to Northern Ireland".

He is a former adjunct faculty member at the University of Denver College of Law and Graduate School of International Studies. He has served on the board of trustees of the University of Northern Colorado and Regis University. He is a frequent panelist and lecturer to legal audiences on trial subjects, ethics and conflict resolution.

== Public service ==
Lyons served as general counsel for the Clinton Transition Foundation and as counsel in the Office of the President-Elect from November 1992 until February 1993.

In 1993, Lyons accepted a Presidential appointment to serve as U.S. Observer to the International Fund for Ireland. The International Fund for Ireland is a multi-nation foundation supported by the United States, the European Union, Canada, New Zealand and Australia. According to an independent assessment by the audit and accounting firm KPMG, the IFI is responsible for the creation of over 31,000 full-time permanent jobs in Northern Ireland and the border counties of the Republic of Ireland, and has been credited with supporting over 3,600 exceeding $1.5 billion of inward investment.

In 1997, Lyons was appointed by the President to replace Senator George J. Mitchell as Special Advisor to the President and U.S. Secretary of State for Economic Initiatives in Northern Ireland and the border counties of the Republic. In this capacity, Lyons coordinated programs of the U.S. State Department, United States Department of Commerce, United States Department of Education, United States Department of Agriculture, United States Department of Labor, and the Small Business Administration in support of the peace process in Northern Ireland. He was responsible for the establishment of Aspire, a micro loan fund in Belfast and the first of its kind in Western Europe. Lyons served as U.S. Observer and Special Advisor until January 2001.

In commenting on his service, President Bill Clinton stated:

"Jim was very important to the peace process in Northern Ireland because of his tireless efforts to keep Americans involved in promoting economic development in a way that benefited both countries, promoted reconciliation and effectively demonstrated the depth of our commitment to peace."

In 2002, the University of Ulster awarded Lyons an honorary Doctorate of Laws in recognition "of his service to the people of Northern Ireland and the cause of peace."

In 2006, Lyons served as executive director of the transition of Colorado Governor-elect Bill Ritter. In 2007, Governor Ritter appointed Lyons co-chair of the Jobs Cabinet, which developed strategies to develop a prepared work force for existing and new businesses and industries in Colorado. In 2010, he co-chaired the Higher Education Strategy Plan (HESP) which examined Colorado's higher education institutions with regard to revenues, mission and governance, access and affordability and K-12 pipeline issues. The report, "The Degree Dividend" was issued in November, 2010.

== Whitewater ==
In February 1992, Lyons was engaged by the Clintons to investigate their involvement in the real estate investment later known as Whitewater. Within a month, Lyons issued a report which concluded that the Clintons had not been involved in the management of the Whitewater real estate venture or the failure or Madison Guaranty Savings & Loan. He also concluded that the Clintons had invested and lost substantial funds in connection with the Whitewater venture.

Two subsequent investigations resulted in reports, including the Final Report of the Independent Counsel. These two reports confirmed the conclusions of the so-called Lyons report. The Final Report of the Independent Counsel stated "all three investigative entities [i.e., Lyons, Pillsbury Madison & Sutro, and Independent Counsel] reached substantially the same conclusions" regarding the Clintons' financial contributions and involvement in Whitewater.

== Nomination to the Tenth Circuit ==
On September 22, 1999, President Clinton nominated Lyons to a seat on the United States Court of Appeals for the Tenth Circuit that had opened up when Tenth Circuit Judge John Porfilio assumed senior status. Although Lyons was given the highest rating ("well qualified") by the nonpartisan American Bar Association and supported by Colorado's senior senator at the time, Republican Ben Nighthorse Campbell, Colorado's other senator, Wayne Allard, used his home-state senator prerogative to block Lyons' nomination because of his ties to President Clinton. At Lyons request, the White House withdrew his nomination in December, 1999. The seat remained vacant until after the election of George W Bush who nominated Timothy Tymkovich in 2003. He was confirmed later that year.

== See also ==
- Bill Clinton judicial appointment controversies

== Notes ==
- "A Fund of Goodwill, the Story of the International Fund for Ireland," Alf McCreary, 2008.
- Interview with President William Jefferson Clinton, Colorado Super Lawyers, 2007.
- Report for the Resolution Trust Corporation by Pillsbury Madison & Sutro, 1995, and Final Report of the Independent Counsel, In re: Madison Guaranty Savings & Loan Association, Vol. II, Arkansas Investigation, Robert W. Ray, Independent Counsel, released March 20, 2002.
- The Denver Post editorial, "Jim Lyons Well Qualified for Tenth Circuit," October 12, 1999.
- Wayne Allard was ranked by Time Magazine as one of the ten "worst senators" in the United States Senate. Time Magazine, April 24, 2006.
