= Allen Snyder (lawyer) =

American lawyer and former nominee to the D.C. Circuit

- Born: Allen Roger Snyder; January 26, 1946 (age 80)
- Education: George Washington University; Harvard Law School (JD)
- Occupation: Lawyer
- Political party: Democratic
- Spouse: Jean Port (m. 1969)
- Children: 1 (adopted)

Allen Roger Snyder (born January 26, 1946) is an American lawyer and a former nominee to the U.S. Court of Appeals for the District of Columbia Circuit.

== Education and legal training ==
Snyder earned a bachelor's degree with distinction from George Washington University in 1967 and a J.D. degree magna cum laude from Harvard Law School in 1971. He was a law clerk for United States Supreme Court justices John Marshall Harlan II, in 1971, and William Rehnquist, in 1972.

== Professional career ==
Snyder joined the Washington, D.C. law firm Hogan & Hartson in 1972 as an associate and later became a partner. During Bill Clinton's presidency, Snyder represented Deputy White House Counsel Bruce Lindsey during the Whitewater controversy. In addition, Snyder represented actress Elizabeth Taylor, successfully blocking an ABC-TV docudrama about her life, according to a September 2004 article about Hogan & Hartson in the Washingtonian magazine. And Snyder represented Netscape as its chief corporate attorney during its antitrust fight against Microsoft.

== Nomination to the U.S. Court of Appeals for the District of Columbia Circuit ==
On September 22, 1999, President Clinton nominated Snyder to the U.S. Court of Appeals for the District of Columbia Circuit to replace the seat held by the retiring Patricia Wald. Although he is a Democrat, Snyder's nomination initially was thought to be fairly uncontroversial, particularly given his long history as a Washington insider and his support from conservatives like Rehnquist, Sen. John Warner, and former appeals court judge Robert Bork. His nomination even received a hearing from the Senate Judiciary Committee in May 2000. However, with Republicans in control of the U.S. Senate and a presidential election looming, Snyder's nomination languished. Ultimately, the Senate chose not to vote on the D.C. Circuit nominations of both Snyder and Elena Kagan. Republican senators claimed that there was some question over whether those D.C. Circuit seats were even necessary, while Democratic senators charged that the Republican leadership in the Senate was trying to keep those two seats open until after the presidential election so that they could be filled with Republican appointees.

In 2001, President George W. Bush nominated Miguel Estrada to the seat to which Snyder had been nominated. Estrada's nomination ran into opposition from Democratic senators, and he withdrew his name from further consideration in early September 2003. Bush subsequently nominated Thomas B. Griffith to that D.C. Circuit seat in 2004, and he was confirmed by the U.S. Senate in 2005.

== Later ==
After Snyder's nomination died, he resigned his partnership at Hogan & Hartson and took early retirement, according to a New York Times article on August 11, 2002. "Senator Specter congratulated me on how well things had gone and told me he was confident I would be confirmed and told me I would be a great judge," Snyder told the Times. "And then the committee never took a vote." Snyder, who is known to be close friends with Chief Justice John G. Roberts, is a longtime resident of Bethesda, Maryland.

== Personal life ==
On August 10, 1969, Snyder married Susan Port. He and his wife served as emergency foster parents for several years and eventually adopted another daughter from the foster care system. In 2011, Snyder was approached by Children's Law Center, the largest legal services organization in the District of Columbia, which works to achieve permanency and stability for children. Snyder joined Children's Law Center to work on appellate cases and strategy. He encourages other lawyers near- or post-retirement to consider similar positions. "There is a great unmet need in the community for pro bono service," Snyder told The National Law Journal. "For a retiring lawyer, it is an opportunity to carve out a niche of the law that you care about."

== See also ==
- Bill Clinton judicial appointment controversies
- List of law clerks for the ninth seat of the Supreme Court of the United States
