= Cynthia Stephens =

American attorney and jurist

Judge of the Michigan Court of Appeals for the First District
- In office December 30, 2008 – March 31, 2022
- Appointed by: Jennifer Granholm
- Preceded by: Helene White
- Succeeded by: Kristina Robinson Garrett

Personal details
- Born: Cynthia Diane Stephens; August 27, 1951 (age 74)
- Education: University of Michigan (BA); Emory University (JD)

Cynthia Diane Stephens (born August 27, 1951) is an American attorney and jurist serving as a judge of the Michigan Court of Appeals for the First District.

== Education ==
Stephens earned a Bachelor of Arts degree from the University of Michigan in 1971 and a Juris Doctor from the Emory University School of Law in 1976.

== Career ==
Stephens was appointed to the court in 2008 by then-Governor Jennifer Granholm. She was previously a circuit court judge and a district court judge. She has been a law professor at Wayne State University, Loyola University Chicago, and the University of Detroit Mercy. Stephens also served as the general counsel to the Michigan Senate and as a commissioner of the State Bar of Michigan.

On May 21, 2020, Judge Stephens issued an opinion upholding Michigan Governor Gretchen Whitmer's executive orders during the COVID-19 pandemic in Michigan and thereby dismissed a lawsuit by the Michigan House of Representatives and Michigan Senate that challenged the Governor's emergency powers.

On November 5, 2020, Judge Stephens dismissed a lawsuit filed by the Donald Trump 2020 presidential campaign over the handling of absentee ballots in the 2020 Presidential election. The campaign alleged that the Michigan Secretary of State, Jocelyn Benson, had undermined "the constitutional right of all Michigan voters ... to participate in fair and lawful elections." Stephens ruled that the case was based on hearsay and should be dismissed, but also stated that Benson was the wrong person for the Trump campaign to sue, as she does not control local ballot counting.

== Sources ==
- Michigan court of appeals bio
