= Jorge Rangel =

American lawyer

Jorge C. Rangel (born February 4, 1948) is a Texas lawyer and a former federal judicial nominee to the U.S. Court of Appeals for the Fifth Circuit.

== Early life and education ==
Born in Alice, Texas, Rangel earned a bachelor's degree from the University of Houston in 1970 and a law degree from the Harvard Law School in 1973.

== Professional career ==
Rangel has worked in private law practice for much of his professional career. From 1975 until 1976, he worked as an assistant professor at the University of Houston Law Center. In 1983, Texas Gov. Mark White appointed Rangel to a state judgeship in Nueces County. He returned to private practice in 1985, and currently is based in Corpus Christi, Texas.

== Nomination to the Fifth Circuit ==
On July 24, 1997, President Clinton nominated Rangel to a vacancy on the Fifth Circuit that had been created by Judge William Lockhart Garwood taking senior status. Rangel's nomination ran into trouble, because as a member of an American Bar Association screening board in the 1980s and early 1990s, Rangel had been critical of some Republicans, including of President Reagan's 1986 ultimately unsuccessful nomination to the federal bench of Jeff Sessions, who later became a senator and member of the very U.S. Senate Judiciary Committee reviewing Rangel's nomination. In addition, the U.S. Senate was controlled by Republicans during the balance of Clinton's second term, causing Rangel's nomination to languish. Rangel waited more than a year for a hearing from the Republican-controlled U.S. Senate Judiciary Committee, but never received one.

After the Senate adjourned in the fall of 1998, Rangel asked Clinton not to resubmit his name to the next session of Congress. Clinton later nominated Enrique Moreno to the seat, but his nomination also languished. President George W. Bush nominated Priscilla Owen to the seat in 2001. She finally won confirmation in 2005.

== See also ==
- Bill Clinton judicial appointment controversies
