= Alston Johnson =

American legal scholar

Harry Alston Johnson III (born March 31, 1946) is an American lawyer, a law professor and a former federal judicial nominee to the U.S. Court of Appeals for the Fifth Circuit.

== Early life and education ==
Born in Baton Rouge and raised in Shreveport, Johnson was a Louisiana delegate to Boys Nation in Washington, D.C. in July 1963. It was there that Johnson would meet future President Bill Clinton, who also was a delegate to Boys Nation. Johnson graduated from Jesuit High School in Shreveport, which now is known as Loyola College Prep, in 1963.

Johnson earned a bachelor's degree in history cum laude in 1967 from Georgetown University, where he was a classmate of Clinton's. Johnson returned to Louisiana for law school, earning a J.D. degree from Louisiana State University Law Center in 1970, where he was a member of the Order of the Coif.

== Professional career ==
In 1972, Johnson joined the faculty of the Louisiana State University Law Center, eventually becoming a full professor in 1978. In June 1984, Johnson joined the Phelps Dunbar law firm in New Orleans as a partner. He has continued to work as an adjunct professor at LSU's law school.

== Political involvement ==
A longtime Democrat, Johnson was a frequent overnight guest at the White House during the Clinton presidency. He also represented future U.S. Sen. Mary Landrieu in a legal matter in 1996, back when she was serving as Louisiana's state treasurer.

== Nomination to the Fifth Circuit ==
On April 22, 1999, President Clinton nominated Johnson to a seat on the Fifth Circuit that had become vacant with the decision by Judge John M. Duhé Jr. to assume senior status. Johnson initially had been considered by the White House in early 1999 as a candidate for a vacancy on the U.S. District Court for the Middle District of Louisiana, the Baton Rouge Advocate reported on January 13, 1999. However, the White House chose instead to nominate Johnson to the appeals-court post. "I am very honored that the president has nominated me to a court with a rich legal history and a reputation for judicial excellence," Johnson told the Shreveport Times in an article that was published on April 24, 1999. "I look forward to being confirmed in due course and serving on this court."

Despite being found "well-qualified" by the American Bar Association and despite having the support of both of his home-state senators, John Breaux and Mary Landrieu, Johnson's nomination languished. Then-Sen. Trent Lott blocked Johnson's nomination because Lott had wanted Clinton to nominate one of Lott's friends, Robert Galloway, to the Mississippi seat on the Fifth Circuit. As a result, the U.S. Senate Judiciary Committee never held a hearing on Johnson's nomination, and the full Senate never took a vote on it.

With just days to go in his presidency, Clinton renominated Johnson on January 3, 2001. However, Johnson's nomination was returned by President Bush on March 20, 2001, along with 61 other executive and judicial nominations that Clinton had made.

In 2001, President George W. Bush nominated Edith Brown Clement to the Fifth Circuit seat to which Johnson had been nominated. She was confirmed by the United States Senate on November 13, 2001, by a 99–0 vote.

On April 5, 2011, The Times-Picayune reported that in a November letter to President Obama, Sen. Mary Landrieu had recommended the names of four individuals to the president for consideration to the vacancy on the Fifth Circuit that had been created by Judge Jacques L. Wiener Jr. assuming senior status in September 2010. The vacancy was ultimately filled by Stephen A. Higginson.

== See also ==
- Bill Clinton judicial appointment controversies
