= Susan Bieke Neilson =

American judge (1956–2006)

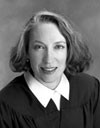

Judge of the United States Court of Appeals for the Sixth Circuit
- In office November 9, 2005 – January 25, 2006
- Appointed by: George W. Bush
- Preceded by: Cornelia Groefsema Kennedy
- Succeeded by: Helene White

Personal details
- Born: August 27, 1956 Ann Arbor, Michigan
- Died: January 25, 2006 (aged 49) Detroit, Michigan
- Education: University of Michigan (AB); Wayne State University (JD)

Susan Bieke Neilson (August 27, 1956 – January 25, 2006) was a United States circuit judge of the United States Court of Appeals for the Sixth Circuit, and before that, a state trial judge in Michigan.

Neilson was nominated by President George W. Bush on February 14, 2005, to a seat vacated by Cornelia G. Kennedy. She was confirmed by the United States Senate on October 27, 2005, and received commission on November 9, 2005. Neilson's service was terminated on January 25, 2006, due to death.

== Background ==
Neilson was born August 27, 1956, in Ann Arbor, Michigan, and was a lifelong Michigan resident. In 1977, she received an Artium Baccalaureus degree in political science from the University of Michigan Honors College. Neilson received her Juris Doctor in 1980 from Wayne State University Law School. Following graduation she practiced products liability, commercial litigation, medical malpractice, and general negligence law with the firm of Dickinson Wright in Detroit, making partner in 1986.

In 1991, Governor John Engler appointed Neilson to the 3rd Judicial Circuit of Michigan, part of the Wayne County Circuit Court, to which she was elected in 1992, and re-elected in 1996, and 2002. Neilson's chambers were in the Coleman A. Young Municipal Center (formerly the City-County Building) in downtown Detroit. While on the bench, Neilson co-wrote and co-edited Michigan Civil Procedure, a two-volume treatise on Michigan civil practice.

Neilson was married with two daughters (Elizabeth, Born in 1984 and Mary, Born in 1990). She was an active Roman Catholic and was a member of the Detroit Catholic Lawyers Society.

== Sixth Circuit nomination and confirmation ==
Neilson was nominated to a Michigan seat on the United States Court of Appeals for the Sixth Circuit by President George W. Bush on November 8, 2001, to replace Judge Cornelia Groefsema Kennedy, who assumed senior status in 1999. On the same day, Bush also nominated Henry Saad and David McKeague to Michigan seats on the Sixth Circuit. On June 26, 2002, Bush nominated Richard Allen Griffin to a fourth Michigan seat on the Sixth Circuit. During the Democrat-controlled 107th Congress, all four nominations were stalled in the Senate Judiciary Committee by then-chairman, Senator Patrick Leahy, D-VT.

In the 2002 midterm congressional elections, the Republicans regained control of the Senate. During the new 108th Congress, Senator Orrin Hatch, R-UT, the new Republican chairman of the Senate Judiciary Committee began to process the previously blocked four nominees. In March 2003, Michigan's two Democratic senators, Carl Levin and Debbie Stabenow announced that they would blue-slip all Bush judicial nominees from Michigan because Bush refused to renominate Helene White and Kathleen McCree Lewis, two Michigan nominees to the Sixth Circuit whose nominations the Senate Republicans had refused to process during President Bill Clinton's second term. Helene White was, at the time, married to Levin's cousin.

Contrary to Levin's and Stabenow's wishes, Hatch gave Saad, McKeague and Griffin hearings, and passed the three nominees out of committee. Furious, Levin and Stabenow convinced their caucus to filibuster the three in order to prevent them from having confirmation votes.

The Senate Republicans increased their numbers in the 109th Congress. Tensions between the Republicans and Democrats rose dramatically as the Republicans sought to break the filibusters of ten Bush court of appeals nominees (including Saad, McKeague and Griffin) by using the nuclear option. In order to defuse the explosive situation concerning the use of the nuclear option and Democrats' obstruction of President Bush's judicial nominations, fourteen moderate Republican and Democratic senators called the Gang of 14 joined together to forge an agreement to guarantee certain filibustered nominations up or down votes. Henry Saad and William Myers, however, were expressly excluded from the deal.

After the Gang of 14 agreement in the Senate in 2005, Neilson finally received a floor vote in the Senate on October 27, 2005. (Fellow Michigan Sixth Circuit nominees Richard Allen Griffin and David McKeague received were confirmed by the Senate in June.) She was confirmed by a 97–0 vote, with both Michigan senators ultimately voting in her favor. Her confirmation came almost exactly four years after her initial nomination. She received her commission on November 9, 2005.

== Illness and death ==
After being nominated by Bush, Neilson learned that she had myelodysplastic syndrome, a rare blood disorder that eventually required her to undergo a bone marrow transplant in 2003. Though greatly diminished physically, Neilson returned to work and, following confirmation, moved her chambers to the federal courthouse in Detroit. On January 25, 2006, Neilson succumbed to the lingering effects of her illness, and died of lung failure in Detroit at the age of 49. Due to her illness and death, Neilson served for only two months on the Sixth Circuit and never wrote any opinions. According to an order of the court published in January 2006, Neilson participated in a decision to rehear a case en banc. The order does not indicate whether Neilson voted for or against rehearing.

Neilson was survived by her husband and two daughters.

== Epilogue ==
After her death, in June 2006, President Bush nominated United States Attorney Stephen J. Murphy III for the United States District Court for the Eastern District of Michigan, as Neilson's replacement. When Levin and Stabenow again balked in the 110th Congress at confirming any more Bush judicial nominees for Michigan, his nomination was withdrawn and replaced with that of failed Clinton nominee Helene White, now divorced from Levin's cousin. White was confirmed to Neilson's old seat in 2008.

== See also ==
- Bill Clinton judicial appointment controversies
- George W. Bush judicial appointment controversies
- filibuster
- nuclear option
- Gang of 14

== Sources ==
- Sixth Circuit Bio

Legal offices
Preceded by Cornelia Groefsema Kennedy	Judge of the United States Court of Appeals for the Sixth Circuit; 2005–2006	Succeeded by Helene White
