= Kent Markus =

American lawyer

Personal details
- Born: Kent Richard Markus; February 1, 1959 (age 67) Cleveland, Ohio, U.S.
- Education: Northwestern University (BA); Harvard Law School (JD)

Kent Richard Markus (born February 1, 1959) is an American attorney. He is currently the Legal Advisor to the Acton-Pepper Transition. In July of 2026, he retired from his service as Bar Counsel and General Counsel at the Columbus Bar Association. Before working at the CBA, he served as a Senior Advisor in the Director's Office and Director of Enforcement at the Consumer Financial Protection Bureau. Markus served as Counselor and Chief Legal Counsel to Ohio Governor Ted Strickland and as a law professor Capital University Law School. During the administration of President Clinton, he was a senior official, working with the Deputy Attorney General and the Attorney General, at the United States Department of Justice. Markus was also a federal judicial nominee to the U.S. Court of Appeals for the Sixth Circuit, though his nomination was never voted upon by the Senate.

== Early life and education ==
Born in Cleveland, Ohio, Markus earned a bachelor's degree from Northwestern University in 1981 and a Juris Doctor (with honors) from Harvard Law School in 1984. As a high school student, he was selected to serve as a Page of the United States House of Representatives and delayed entering college to serve as the Personal Page for US House Speakers Carl Albert and Tip O'Neill.

== Career ==
After graduating from law school, Markus returned home to Cleveland and clerked for U.S. District Judge Alvin Krenzler from 1984 to 1986. He then worked at an Ohio law firm doing plaintiff's civil rights work and representing labor unions from 1986 to 1989, while also serving as an adjunct law professor at Cleveland–Marshall College of Law from 1986 to 1988 and managing various local political campaigns. He left law practice to manage then-State Senator Lee Fisher's campaign for Ohio Attorney General, and subsequently served as Fisher's Chief of Staff. Two years later, Markus became the Executive Director and Chief of Staff at the Democratic National Committee before joining the United States Department of Justice in 1994.

At the Department of Justice, Markus worked as Counsel to Deputy Attorney General Jamie Gorelick in 1994, and Principal Deputy Assistant Attorney General, and Acting Assistant Attorney General for Legislative Affairs from 1995 to 1996. He then served as Counselor to Attorney General Janet Reno and Deputy Chief of Staff from 1996 to 1998. Upon the birth of his son, he returned to Ohio where he founded the National Center for Adoption Law & Policy at Capital University Law School and taught what was at that time the nation's only regular law school class regarding the law of adoption. The Center is known, today, as the Family and Youth Law Center at Capital University Law School. He also taught courses in remedies, legislation and administrative law.

=== Nomination to the Sixth Circuit ===
On February 9, 2000, Bill Clinton nominated Markus to the U.S. Court of Appeals for the Sixth Circuit to take the place of David Aldrich Nelson, who had assumed senior status. With the U.S. Senate controlled by Republicans during Clinton's second term, Markus' nomination languished. Despite the fact that he had the support of both of his home-state Republican senators, no hearing was ever scheduled on his nomination by the U.S. Senate Judiciary Committee, and no confirmation vote ever was taken by the full Senate. When George W. Bush became president in 2001, he subsequently withdrew 62 executive and judicial nominations, including that of Markus. In 2001, Bush nominated Jeffrey Sutton to the seat to which Markus had been nominated. Sutton was confirmed on April 29, 2003.

=== Later career ===
On January 8, 2007, Ohio Gov. Ted Strickland announced that Markus would be taking a leave of absence from Capital University to serve as Ted Strickland's Chief Legal Counsel. He later also served as Counselor to the Governor. Markus' name came up as a possible interim replacement for former Ohio Attorney General Marc Dann, who resigned from office on May 14, 2008.

In the Spring of 2011, Markus became the Deputy Director for Enforcement at the newly-established Consumer Financial Protection Bureau. He became the Bureau's Enforcement Director in January 2012. In February 2015, Markus became a Senior Advisor at the Bureau in the Office of the Director. He was succeeded as Enforcement Director by Tony Alexis.

In 2018, Markus joined the Columbus Bar Association as Bar Counsel and General Counsel. He managed all disciplinary and admissions work of the Bar Association and provided general legal advice to the Bar's Executive Director and Board regarding the overall work of the organization.

After leaving the Bar Association in the summer of 2026, Markus assisted the Acton-Pepper gubernatorial campaign with myriad projects and became the Legal Advisor to their Transition following their victory in November 2026.

== Personal life ==
Markus is married to Capital University Law School professor Susan Gilles. They have one son.

== See also ==
- Bill Clinton judicial appointment controversies
