= William Hoeveler =

American judge

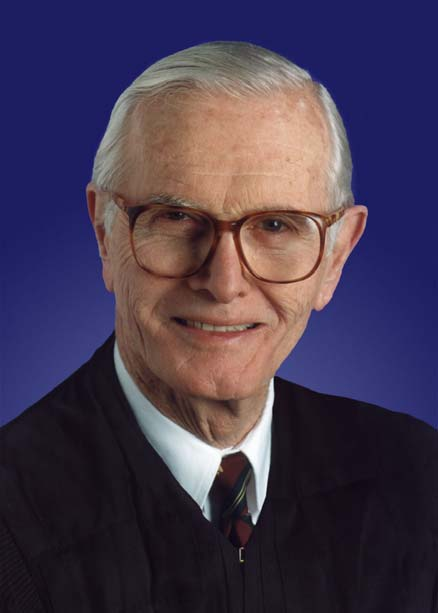

Senior Judge of the United States District Court for the Southern District of Florida
- In office January 31, 1991 – November 18, 2017

Judge of the United States District Court for the Southern District of Florida
- In office April 26, 1977 – January 31, 1991
- Appointed by: Jimmy Carter
- Preceded by: Peter T. Fay
- Succeeded by: Wilkie D. Ferguson

Personal details
- Born: William Marcellin Hoeveler; August 23, 1922 Paris, France
- Died: November 18, 2017 (aged 95) Coral Gables, Florida
- Education: Bucknell University (BA); Harvard Law School (LLB)

Military service
- Allegiance: United States
- Branch/service: United States Marine Corps
- Years of service: 1942–1946
- Rank: Lieutenant
- Battles/wars: World War II/Pacific War

William Marcellin Hoeveler (August 23, 1922 – November 18, 2017) was a United States district judge of the United States District Court for the Southern District of Florida.

== Education and career ==
Hoeveler was born in 1922 in Paris, France. He was a standout athlete in football, basketball, tennis, volleyball and track while attending Haverford High School in Havertown, Pennsylvania from which he graduated in 1941. He then attended Temple University but left college to enlist in the United States Marine Corps during World War II, where he served a tour of duty in the Pacific as a lieutenant from 1942 to 1946. Hoeveler graduated from Bucknell University, where he was a member of Sigma Chi, with a Bachelor of Arts degree in 1947. He graduated from Harvard Law School with a Bachelor of Laws in 1950. Hoeveler conducted private practice in Miami, Florida from 1951 to 1977.

== Federal judicial service ==
President Jimmy Carter nominated Hoeveler to the United States District Court for the Southern District of Florida on April 5, 1977, to the seat vacated by Judge Peter T. Fay. Confirmed by the Senate on April 25, 1977, he received commission on April 26, 1977. He assumed senior status on January 31, 1991. Hoeveler gained a reputation as a champion of the Everglades and an opponent of Florida's sugar industry ("Big Sugar") during his time on the bench. He also presided over the trial of deposed Panamanian ruler Manuel Noriega and hearings in the Elián González affair. He died on November 18, 2017, at his home in Coral Gables, aged 95.

== Former law clerks ==
- Kevin Martin, former Federal Communications Commission chair

Legal offices
Preceded by Peter T. Fay	Judge of the United States District Court for the Southern District of Florida; 1977–1991	Succeeded by Wilkie D. Ferguson
