= Charles Stack (lawyer) =

American lawyer (1935–2022)

- Born: Charles Rickman Stack; September 26, 1935; Boston, Massachusetts, U.S.
- Died: September 20, 2022 (aged 86)
- Other name: Bud Stack
- Education: University of Florida (BSBA); Fredric G. Levin College of Law (JD)
- Occupation: Lawyer
- Political party: Democratic
- Spouse: Barbara A. Levine

Charles Rickman "Bud" Stack (September 26, 1935 – September 20, 2022) was a Florida lawyer and a former federal judicial nominee to the U.S. Court of Appeals for the Eleventh Circuit whose nomination became a campaign issue during the 1996 presidential campaign.

== Early life and education ==
Raised in Melbourne, Florida, Stack earned a bachelor's degree in business administration from the University of Florida. He then earned a Juris Doctor (J.D.) degree from the University of Florida College of Law.

== Professional career ==
Stack was a personal-injury and product liability lawyer for many years, co-founding the High Stack Gordon firm in Melbourne, Florida in 1962. His co-founder of the firm was Miami Mayor Robert King High.

== Political involvement ==
In 1991, Stack offered to help Bill Clinton in his campaign for president after watching Clinton give a speech on C-SPAN, according to an article in the Miami Herald. Stack then served as the Florida Finance Chairman for the Clinton campaign in 1992, raising $7 million for the campaign. Shortly after Clinton was elected president, Stack informed the Clinton administration that he was interested in an appeals-court judgeship, although the president's aides had discussed instead offering him an ambassadorship or a seat on a lower court.

== Nomination to the Eleventh Circuit and 1996 presidential campaign controversy ==
On October 27, 1995, President Clinton nominated Stack to a seat on the Eleventh Circuit that had been vacated by Peter Thorp Fay, who had taken senior status the previous year. "Ever since I got out of law school, I thought there should be a time when I would be a law school professor or a judge," Stack told the Associated Press in an article that appeared on its wire on April 29, 1996 "I've practiced law for 35 years. I wanted to do something new."

Although the U.S. Senate at that time was controlled by Republicans, Stack's nomination initially was not necessarily thought to be controversial. Even Republican Sen. Orrin Hatch, then the chairman of the U.S. Senate Judiciary Committee, praised Stack. "I think he's a good nominee," Hatch told the St. Petersburg Times in an article that appeared on October 28, 1995. "He's a close friend of the president, but I personally do not believe it should be a disqualification." On February 28, 1996, at a hearing on his nomination before the U.S. Senate Judiciary Committee, Stack said he was not familiar with Adarand Constructors, Inc. v. Peña, a key Supreme Court ruling on minority set-aside contracts from in 1995, and acknowledged that he had only tried a handful of criminal cases, according to a March 29, 1996 article on the hearing in the St. Petersburg Times.

On April 22, 1996, Republican presidential candidate Bob Dole, as part of an effort to make Clinton's judicial picks a campaign issue, called on the White House to withdraw Stack's nomination, citing what Dole called a lack of knowledge about major legal issues. "Those who seek to sit on the federal bench should be well grounded in basic constitutional law," Dole said from the floor of the U.S. Senate. Stack "does not meet this standard," Dole said. Three days earlier, Dole had made a speech in which he pledged to make Clinton's judicial picks a major issue during the 1996 presidential race.

On May 9, 1996, Stack asked President Clinton to withdraw his nomination to the Eleventh Circuit. "It was not to be!" Stack wrote in his letter to Clinton requesting that his nomination be withdrawn, according to an article in the St. Petersburg Times that was published on May 10, 1996. "Election-year politics has brought criticism and negative comment, which ordinarily would not have been forthcoming from people who knew little or nothing about me. These unfortunate conditions have resulted in extended delay of any action by the Senate. Moreover, it would be naive of me to believe, under such prevailing conditions, that the Senate would at this time act favorably on my appointment." Stack told the Miami Herald in an article that appeared on May 10, 1996 that "I couldn't get through the Senate on the partisan vote that would have occurred." The withdrawal was formally submitted to the Senate on May 13, 1996.

In 1997, Clinton nominated Stanley Marcus to the seat to which Stack had been nominated. Marcus was confirmed by the U.S. Senate later that year.

== Personal life ==
Stack died on September 20, 2022. He was survived by a wife, his son and two daughters.
