= James Andrew Wynn =

American judge (born 1954)

James Wynn
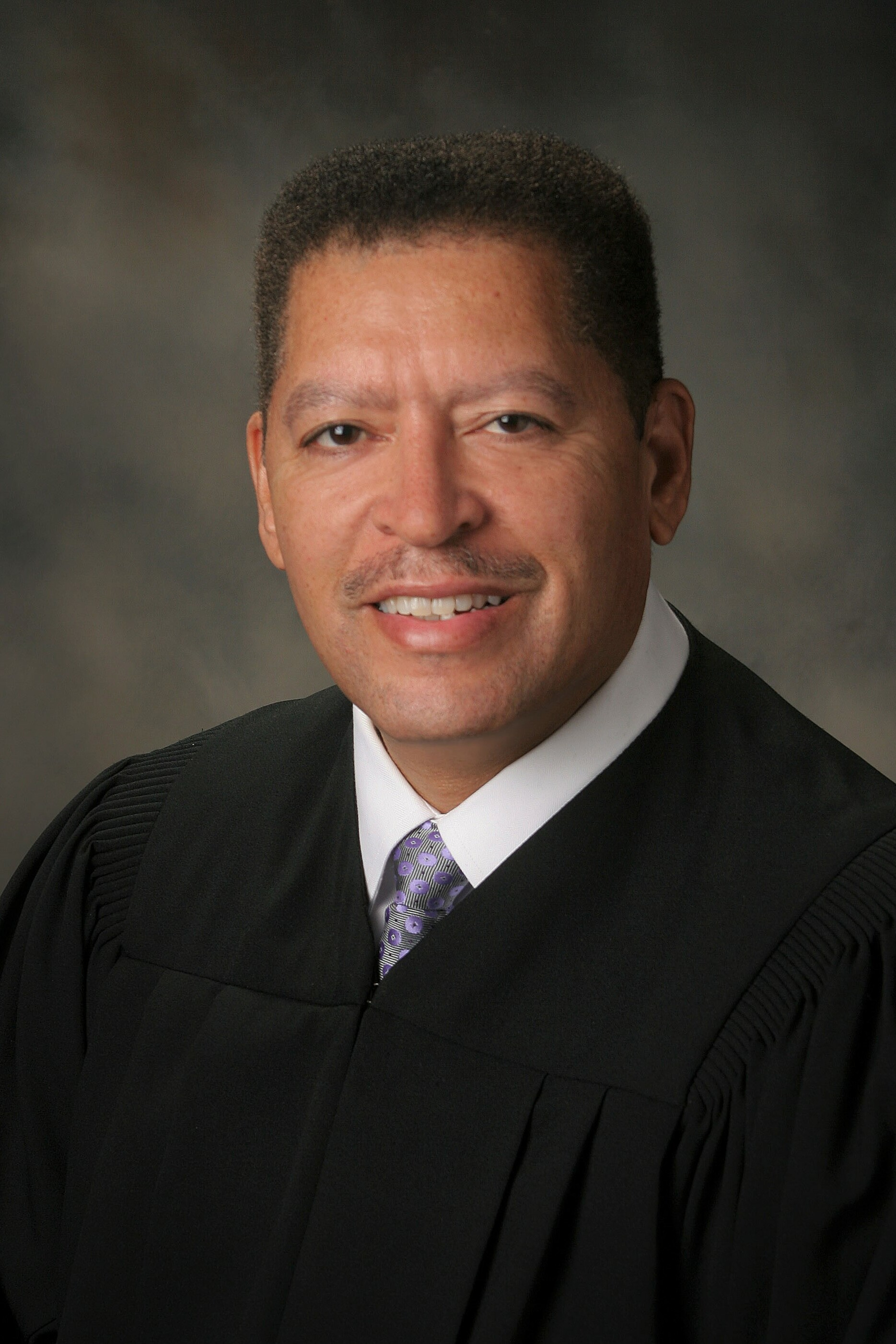

Judge of the United States Court of Appeals for the Fourth Circuit
- Incumbent
- Assumed office August 10, 2010
- Appointed by: Barack Obama
- Preceded by: James Dickson Phillips Jr.

Judge of the North Carolina Court of Appeals
- In office January 5, 1999 – August 9, 2010
- Appointed by: Jim Hunt
- Preceded by: Himself
- Succeeded by: Cressie Thigpen
- In office 1990 – September 30, 1998
- Preceded by: Allyson K. Duncan
- Succeeded by: Himself

Associate Justice of the North Carolina Supreme Court
- In office October 1, 1998 – December 31, 1998
- Preceded by: John Webb
- Succeeded by: George L. Wainwright Jr.

Personal details
- Born: James Andrew Wynn Jr. March 17, 1954 (age 72) Robersonville, North Carolina, U.S.
- Education: University of North Carolina, Chapel Hill (BA); Marquette University (JD); University of Virginia (LLM)

Military service
- Allegiance: United States
- Branch/service: United States Navy
- Years of service: 1979–2009
- Rank: Captain
- Unit: Army Judge Advocate General's Corps

James Andrew Wynn Jr. (born March 17, 1954) is an American jurist. He serves as a United States circuit judge of the United States Court of Appeals for the Fourth Circuit and formerly served on both the North Carolina Court of Appeals and the North Carolina Supreme Court.

== Background ==
Wynn grew up in the Eastern North Carolina community of Robersonville, one of eight children. His family operated a farm on which he worked during his childhood.

He holds degrees from the University of North Carolina at Chapel Hill (Bachelor of Arts, Journalism, 1975); Marquette University Law School (Juris Doctor, 1979); and the University of Virginia School of Law (Master of Laws, Judicial Process, 1995).

== Early career ==
Following graduation from law school, Wynn served for four years on active duty in the Judge Advocate General's Corps, U.S. Navy. He was stationed in Norfolk, Virginia. He continued his service for 26 more years in the U.S. Naval Reserve, which included service as a military judge. He retired in 2009 at the rank of captain.

Following his active-duty military service, Wynn briefly served as an Assistant Appellate Defender for the State of North Carolina before joining the Wilson, North Carolina law firm of Fitch & Butterfield—later known as Fitch, Butterfield & Wynn.

== Judicial career ==
=== State judicial service ===
From 1990 to 2010, Wynn served on both the North Carolina Court of Appeals and the Supreme Court of North Carolina.

=== Federal judicial service ===
==== Nominations under Clinton ====
On August 5, 1999, President Bill Clinton nominated Wynn to serve on the United States Court of Appeals for the Fourth Circuit to fill a vacancy created by Judge James Dickson Phillips Jr.'s decision to assumed senior status in 1994. The nomination was part of an effort to integrate the Fourth Circuit, which, despite representing the largest per-capita African American population of any judicial circuit, had never had an African American judge. At the time, the Fourth Circuit was the only circuit to never have had a person of color serve as a circuit judge.

Citing testimony before the U.S. Senate that the Fourth Circuit did not need any more judges, North Carolina Senator Jesse Helms refused to submit a blue slip that would have allowed Wynn a hearing before the U.S. Senate Judiciary Committee. This left the seat vacated by Judge James Dickson Phillips Jr. in 1994 vacant until Wynn's ultimate confirmation in 2010. It also left the court without North Carolina representation for four years (from the death of Judge Samuel James Ervin III in September 1999 until Judge Allyson K. Duncan arrived on the court in August 2003). Ultimately, President Clinton issued a recess appointment to Judge Roger Gregory of Virginia in December 2000, making him the first African American judge to sit on the Fourth Circuit.

President Clinton nominated Wynn a second time on January 3, 2001, shortly before leaving office. The nomination was withdrawn by President George W. Bush two months later.

==== Nomination under Obama ====
On November 4, 2009, President Barack Obama nominated Wynn and Special Superior Court Judge for Complex Business Cases Albert Diaz for seats on the Fourth Circuit. Obama's renomination of Wynn and nomination of Diaz were jointly endorsed by North Carolina senators Kay Hagan, a Democrat, and Richard Burr, a Republican. His nomination was confirmed by the full Senate on August 5, 2010, by unanimous consent. He received his commission on August 10, 2010.

==== Senior status decision and reversal ====
On January 9, 2024, Wynn informed President Biden by letter that he would assume senior status upon the confirmation of a successor nominated by the President and confirmed by the Senate. President Biden subsequently nominated North Carolina Solicitor General Ryan Park to fill the anticipated vacancy. Although Park’s nomination advanced through the Senate Judiciary Committee, it faced open opposition from North Carolina’s home-state senators. Ultimately, in December 2024, Senators struck a bipartisan deal to advance some judicial nominees to a vote while declining to advance others, including Park. Park withdrew his name from consideration in light of the reported deal.

Shortly thereafter, with no nominee pending before the Senate, Wynn wrote to President Biden withdrawing his January 2024 letter and advising that he would remain in active service on the Fourth Circuit. This decision upset some Republican politicians, including North Carolina Senator Thom Tillis, because it had the effect of depriving the incoming Trump administration of a judicial vacancy that Senators had assumed would be available when they reached the deal within the Senate. Other commentators, however, viewed Judge Wynn’s action differently, noting that he had merely elected to continue serving after the Senate failed to confirm the nominee selected to succeed him and that other judges had previously rescinded letters indicating an intention to take senior status.

== Other activities ==
- Marquette University Board of Trustees (Chair of University’s Athletic Committee)
- Former Member of Board of Directors, American Bar Endowment (Chair, Finance Committee)
- Former Member of Board of Trustees, Pitt Community College, Winterville, NC
- Special Advisor to the Board of Directors for American Bar Association’s Rule of Law Initiative
- Life Member, National Conference of Uniform Law Commissioners
- Member, American Law Institute
- Immediate Past Chair, American Bar Association's Center for Human Rights
- Life Member, Kappa Alpha Psi fraternity
- Member, Sigma Pi Phi fraternity
- Prince Hall of Masons, 33rd Degree Freemason
- Chair, Board of Deacons at his church

== Notable cases ==
=== Liberty University, Inc. v. Geithner, 671 F.3d 391 (4th Cir. 2011) ===
In a concurring opinion, Wynn became the first federal judge, and only lower-federal-court judge, to conclude that Congress had the authority to establish the individual mandate in the Affordable Care Act pursuant to its plenary taxing power. The Supreme Court subsequently upheld the individual mandate under that theory in NFIB v. Sebelius.

=== North Carolina Voting Rights Cases ===
In 2014, Wynn wrote the majority opinion preliminarily enjoining portions of a North Carolina law that denied minority groups equal access to voting. League of Women Voters of North Carolina v. North Carolina, 769 F.3d 224 (4th Cir. 2014). Wynn was later a member of a panel that held that the provisions of the law that required photo identification to vote, reduced early-voting opportunities, and eliminated out-of-precinct voting, same-day registration, and pre-registration, were enacted with discriminatory intent, and thus, were unconstitutional. North Carolina State Conference of NAACP v. McCrory, 831 F.3d 204 (4th Cir. 2016). The majority held that the North Carolina General Assembly's "new provisions target[ed] African Americans with almost surgical precision." Wynn wrote the section of the majority opinion as to remedy, permanently enjoining the State from implementing the unconstitutional provisions. The Supreme Court declined to hear the case, leaving the Fourth Circuit's holding in place.

=== Partisan Gerrymandering ===
In August 2018, Wynn wrote the majority opinion for a three-judge district court panel striking down North Carolina's congressional districts on grounds that the state's 2016 districting plan constituted a partisan gerrymander in violation of Article I of the Constitution and the First and Fourteenth Amendments. Common Cause v. Rucho, 318 F. Supp. 3d 777 (M.D.N.C. 2018). The Supreme Court vacated Wynn's opinion, holding that the case presented a nonjusticiable political question because there are no "judicially manageable standards" with which to measure political gerrymandering. Rucho v. Common Cause, 139 S. Ct. 2484 (2019). Wynn has been outspoken about his disagreement with the Supreme Court's decision.

=== Long v. Hooks, 972 F.3d 442 (4th Cir. 2020) (en banc) ===
In 1976, an all-white North Carolina jury convicted a Black man, Ronnie Long, of raping a white woman. Decades later, new evidence that had not been disclosed to the defense came to light. The defendant sought habeas relief. The en banc majority remanded the case to the district court for further consideration. Wynn authored a concurring opinion, arguing that the court should grant immediate relief. Wynn reasoned that no reasonable jury could convict the defendant based on the new evidence.

During oral arguments, Wynn questioned why, if the State's goal was to seek justice, it was not willing to look at the new evidence. He also called attention to the racial dynamics at play. The case involved police officers failing to disclose key evidence and lying on the stand. He noted that numerous Black men had been wrongfully prosecuted at the time and cited the country's history of lynchings.

Less than four months after the case was decided, North Carolina Governor Roy Cooper pardoned Long.

=== Peltier v. Charter Day School, Inc. (4th Cir. 2022) (en banc) ===
In a 10–6 decision, joined by Judge Wynn, the full court held that a public charter school was a state actor for the purposes of 42 U.S.C. § 1983. Senior Judge Barbara Milano Keenan, writing for the majority, also concluded that the school’s dress code, which "requires female students to wear skirts to school based on the view that girls are 'fragile vessels' deserving of 'gentle' treatment by boys," plainly violates the Fourteenth Amendment's Equal Protection Clause.

Wynn penned a concurrence joined by four other judges critiquing policy arguments raised by some of the dissenting judges. He dismissed concerns that the majority's Equal Protection holding would threaten historically Black colleges and universities, pointing out that just because an "institution is historically Black . . . does not mean that school is currently engaging in racial discrimination." He also rejected the dissenting judges' argument that "subjecting schools like Charter Day to the demands of the Constitution" will stifle "educational progress," noting that "[t]wo hundred and fifty years of innovation and ingenuity—enabled by our American constitutional system—say otherwise."

=== Nelson v. Freeland, 349 N.C. 615 (1998) ===
During his tenure on the Supreme Court of North Carolina, Wynn authored an opinion abolishing the longstanding invitee/licensee framework for evaluating premises-liability claims and replacing it with a new standard under which property owners owe a duty of reasonable care to all lawful visitors.

=== United States v. Graham, 824 F.3d 421 (4th Cir. 2016) (en banc) ===
Wynn wrote an opinion concurring in part and dissenting in part, arguing that cell site location information is not voluntarily conveyed by cell phone users and, therefore, is protected by the Fourth Amendment. The Supreme Court subsequently agreed. Carpenter v. United States, 138 S. Ct. 2206 (2018).

=== International Refugee Assistance Project v. Trump, 857 F.3d 554 (4th Cir. 2017) (en banc) ===
Wynn wrote a concurring opinion contending that President Trump's "travel ban" exceeded the President's authority under the Immigration and Nationality Act because it denied entry to a class of aliens on the basis of invidious discrimination. Wynn's opinion was grounded in the interpretive principle that absent a clear statement by Congress, courts should not construe a delegation of congressional power as authorizing the delegates to exercise that power in a manner that curtails or dilutes fundamental rights.

=== G. G. v. Gloucester County School Board, 972 F.3d 586 (4th Cir. 2020) ===
In August 2020, Wynn joined the majority in G. G. v. Gloucester County School Board. In a 2–1 decision, the court held that a Virginia school board violated Title IX when it prevented a transgender man from using the boys' bathroom. Judge Henry F. Floyd wrote for the majority that "[a]t the heart of this appeal is whether equal protection and Title IX can protect transgender students from school bathroom policies that prohibit them from affirming their gender. We join a growing consensus of courts in holding that the answer is resoundingly yes." Wynn, concurring, wrote that

the Board's classification on the basis of "biological gender"—defined in this appeal as the sex marker on a student's birth certificate—is arbitrary and provides no consistent reason to assign transgender students to bathrooms on a binary male/female basis. Rather, the Board's use of "biological gender" to classify students has the effect of shunting individuals like Grimm—who may not use the boys’ bathrooms because of their "biological gender," and who cannot use the girls’ bathrooms because of their gender identity—to a third category of bathroom altogether: the “alternative appropriate private facilit[ies]" established in the policy for "students with gender identity issues." That is indistinguishable from the sort of separate-but-equal treatment that is anathema under our jurisprudence. No less than the recent historical practice of segregating Black and white restrooms, schools, and other public accommodations, the unequal treatment enabled by the Board's policy produces a vicious and ineradicable stigma.

The Supreme Court declined to grant review, leaving the Fourth Circuit's holding in place.

=== Hirschfeld v. Bureau of Alcohol, Firearms, Tobacco and Explosives, 5 F.4th 407 (4th Cir. 2021) ===
In July 2021, Wynn dissented from a Fourth Circuit panel's decision to strike down as unconstitutional a longstanding federal statute preventing federally licensed gun dealers from selling handguns to individuals under the age of 21.

=== Cawthorn v. Amalfi, 35 F.4th 245 (4th Cir. 2022) ===
In a concurring opinion, Wynn became the first federal appellate judge to conclude that Article I, Section 5 does not render states "powerless to regulate candidates or ballot access" for congressional office. He observed that by its plain terms, Article I, Section 5 "only applies to Congress's 'own Members,'" so Congress must lack "exclusive control to judge the qualifications of nonmembers, including candidates." A contrary holding, he wrote, would not only do violence to the Constitution's text but would also mean states would be unable to prevent "'fraudulent or unqualified candidates such as minors, out-of-state residents, or foreign nationals' from running for office." And "[n]either the Constitution, nor Supreme Court precedent, nor common sense supports that irrational result."

=== E.I. du Pont de Nemours and Co. v. Kolon Industries, 637 F.3d 435 (4th Cir. 2011) ===
Wynn authored one of the first opinions applying the plausibility pleading standard set forth in Bell Atlantic Corp. v. Twombly, 550 U.S. 544 (2007), to an attempted monopolization case under Section 2 of the Sherman Antitrust Act. The opinion discusses at length what types of facts a complaint must allege to sufficiently plead a relevant geographic market.

== Madison Lecture ==
The Madison Lecture, "the most important lecture series" at NYU School of Law, is "designed to enhance the appreciation of civil liberty and strengthen the sense of national purpose." Wynn's 2020 lecture explained his definition of judicial activism, exemplified by the Supreme Court's decision in Rucho v. Common Cause. He proposed that a court engages in judicial activism if it fails to consider well-established decisional tools that are relevant to deciding a particular case. Wynn contended that textualism is a type of judicial activism because it permits judges to disregard legislative history. Wynn further argued that Rucho is an activist opinion because it disregarded several well-established decisional tools.

== Publications ==
- When Judges and Justices Throw Out Tools: Judicial Activism in Rucho v. Common Cause, 96 N.Y.U. Law Review 607 (2021)
- Opinion: As a judge, I have to follow the Supreme Court. It should fix this mistake, The Washington Post (2020)
- State v. Mann, 13 N.C. 263 (N.C. 1830): Judicial Choice or Judicial Duty, 87 North Carolina Law Review 991 (2009)
- Judicial Diversity: Where Independence and Accountability Meet, 67 Albany Law Review 775 (2004)
- Ground to Stand on: Charles Hamilton Houston’s Legal Foundation for Dr. King, 9 N.C. Bar. J. (2004)
- Judging the Judges, Marquette University Law Review, 86 Marq. L. Rev. 753, Spring 2003
- Military Courts and the All Writs Act: Who Supervises the Military Justice System?, Judges Journal, American Bar Association, Vol. 45, No. 3

== Selected honors and awards ==
The North Carolina Law Review, the law journal of the University of North Carolina School of Law, held a Symposium in 2022 in honor of Judge Wynn's decades on the bench. The distinguished list of speakers included Judge W. Earl Britt, Professor Stephen Wermiel, Justice Patricia Timmons-Goodson, and Justice Anita Earls. As part of the Symposium, the journal also published a series of essays related to Judge Wynn's legacy, including essays by Professor Michael Tigar and Professor Gene Nichol.

Awards include:

- Alumnus of the Year, Marquette University Law School (2018)
- Spirit of Excellence Award, American Bar Association (2018)
- Liberty Bell Award, North Carolina Bar Association (2018)
- Raymond Pace Alexander Award, National Bar Association (2008)
- Harvey E. Beech Outstanding Alumni Award, University of North Carolina at Chapel Hill (2008)
- All-University Alumni Merit Award, Marquette University (2004)
- E. Harold Hollows Lecturer, Marquette Law School (2003)
- Martin Luther King Achievement Award, General Baptist State Convention of North Carolina (1996)
- Appellate Judge of the Year, North Carolina Academy of Trial Lawyers (1995)
- Order of the Old Well, University of North Carolina at Chapel Hill (1979)
- Military Decorations:
  - Meritorious Service Medal (3 awards/stars)
  - Navy Commendation Medal (2 awards/stars)
  - Navy Achievement Medal
  - Naval Reserve Medal
  - National Defense Service Medal
  - Global War on Terrorism Medal

== See also ==
- Bill Clinton judicial appointment controversies
- List of African-American federal judges
- List of African-American jurists

Legal offices
Preceded by John Webb	Associate Justice of the North Carolina Supreme Court; 1998	Succeeded by George L. Wainwright Jr.
Preceded by James Dickson Phillips Jr.	Judge of the United States Court of Appeals for the Fourth Circuit; 2010–present	Incumbent
