= J. Rich Leonard =

American lawyer (born 1949)

J. Rich Leonard (born 1949) has been the dean of the Norman Adrian Wiggins School of Law since July 2013. He previously served as a U.S. bankruptcy judge for the Eastern District of North Carolina and was chief judge from 1998 until 2005. Leonard was also a former federal judicial nominee to the U.S. Court of Appeals for the Fourth Circuit and the U.S. District Court for the Eastern District of North Carolina.

== Early life and education ==
Born in North Carolina and a native of Welcome, North Carolina, Leonard earned a bachelor's degree in 1971 from the University of North Carolina at Chapel Hill, where he was a Morehead Scholar and graduated Phi Beta Kappa. At UNC, he served as the president of the Carolina Union and was awarded the John J. Parker Medal and the Frank Porter Graham awards for outstanding leadership, and the Howard Odom Prize as the top undergraduate sociology major. Leonard earned a master's degree in education from UNC in 1973 and then earned a J.D. degree from Yale Law School in 1976.

== Professional career ==
From 1976 until 1978, Leonard worked as a law clerk for Judge Franklin Taylor Dupree Jr. He then worked briefly in private practice from 1978 until 1979 with the firm of Sanford, Adams, McCullough, and Beard before becoming clerk of court for the United States District Court for the Eastern District of North Carolina in 1979, the youngest such clerk in the country at that time.

== Federal judicial service ==
In 1981, Leonard was appointed to be a federal magistrate judge, a position he held until becoming a U.S. Bankruptcy Judge in 1992. In his last year at the district court, Leonard received the first Director’s Award for Leadership in the federal courts for his work in setting up training programs for judicial employees. While at the bankruptcy court, Leonard was heavily involved in federal court administration nationally. He served on the prestigious Judicial Conference Committee on Court Administration and Case Management (CACM). In that capacity, he oversaw the development of the first electronic filing system in the federal courts and played a role in the development of PACER, the public access system to the federal courts. He also served repeatedly as a consultant for the U. S. State Department to emerging judiciaries in sub-Saharan Africa, traveling to Zambia, Tanzania, Namibia, Kenya, and Nigeria more than thirty times.

During his time with the bankruptcy court, Leonard was also active in the National Conference of Bankruptcy Judges. He served as a member of the Board of Governors, chaired the Endowment for Education, and was the editor-in-chief of the American Bankruptcy Law Journal. In 2011, the American Bar Association gave Leonard the prestigious Robert Yegge Award for his Outstanding Contribution to Judicial Administration.

=== Expired nomination to Fourth Circuit ===
On December 22, 1995, President Bill Clinton nominated Leonard to be an appeals court judge on the U.S. Court of Appeals for the Fourth Circuit. Leonard was appointed to a newly created post. Almost immediately, Leonard's nomination ran into opposition from North Carolina Senator Jesse Helms, who objected to Clinton's refusal to renominate Helms' preferred candidate, Terrence Boyle. President George H. W. Bush had nominated Boyle to that Fourth Circuit seat in 1992, but the U.S. Senate never acted on the nomination, and the nomination lapsed with the end of Bush's presidency.

The U.S. Senate did not hold a hearing or a vote on Leonard's Fourth Circuit nomination during 1996, and Clinton did not renominate him to the Fourth Circuit after his second term began in January 1997. That seat on the Fourth Circuit eventually was filled by Roger Gregory, whose nomination by Clinton was never acted upon by the Senate. Clinton subsequently installed Gregory on the Fourth Circuit in a recess appointment in December 2000, and President George W. Bush gave Gregory a permanent appointment to the seat the following year.

=== Expired nomination to the U.S. District Court for the Eastern District of North Carolina ===
On March 24, 1999, Clinton nominated Leonard to be a U.S. District judge for the United States District Court for the Eastern District of North Carolina. Leonard was nominated to fill the seat vacated by W. Earl Britt, who took senior status on December 7, 1997. The News and Observer reported on March 25, 1999, that the nomination was made at the request of then-Sen. John Edwards, who is a close friend of Leonard. Helms then announced his opposition to Leonard's nomination because he had wanted to shift that open seat to the United States District Court for the Western District of North Carolina.

The Senate also did not hold a hearing or a vote on Leonard's District Court nomination in 1999 or 2000, and the nomination lapsed with the end of Clinton's presidency.

== Academic career ==
Leonard has been the dean of Campbell University's Norman Adrian Wiggins School of Law since July 15, 2013. In 2014, North Carolina Lawyer’s Weekly named Leonard the North Carolina Lawyer of the Year.

== Personal ==
Leonard is the father of five children. He and his wife, Dr. Whitney Cain, live in Raleigh, North Carolina.

== See also ==
- Bill Clinton judicial appointment controversies
