= Helene White =

American judge (born 1954)

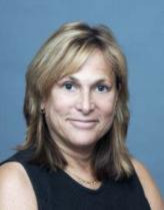
- White in 2009

Senior Judge of the United States Court of Appeals for the Sixth Circuit
- Incumbent
- Assumed office June 13, 2022

Judge of the United States Court of Appeals for the Sixth Circuit
- In office August 8, 2008 – June 13, 2022
- Appointed by: George W. Bush
- Preceded by: Susan Bieke Neilson
- Succeeded by: Stephanie D. Davis

Personal details
- Born: December 2, 1954 (age 71) New York City, New York, U.S.
- Party: Democratic
- Spouse: Charles Levin (div. 2006)
- Education: Barnard College (BA); University of Pennsylvania (JD)

Helene N. White (born December 2, 1954) is a senior United States circuit judge of the United States Court of Appeals for the Sixth Circuit. Previously, she was a judge on the Michigan Court of Appeals.

== Background ==
Born in Jackson Heights, Queens in New York City, White graduated with a Bachelor of Arts degree in economics from Barnard College in 1975 and the University of Pennsylvania Law School with a Juris Doctor in 1978. She then clerked for two years for Michigan Supreme Court Justice Charles Levin, whom she would later marry and, in November 2006, divorce. White then won an elected position on the Detroit Court of Common Pleas, and in 1982 was elected to the Wayne County Circuit Court. White was elected to her position on the Michigan Court of Appeals for the 1st district in November 1992 and served from January 1, 1993 until August 11, 2008, and was succeeded by Cynthia Stephens.

== Federal judicial service ==
=== Expired Sixth Circuit nomination under Clinton ===
On January 7, 1997, President Bill Clinton nominated White to a vacancy on the United States Court of Appeals for the Sixth Circuit that was vacated by Judge Damon Keith, who assumed senior status on May 1, 1995. With the United States Senate controlled by Republicans during Clinton's entire second term, White's nomination languished for more than four years, chiefly because of objections from Michigan's Republican senator at the time, Spencer Abraham.

Abraham had been angry with Clinton because Abraham previously had aided the president in getting three Democratic judicial nominees from Michigan approved in the Republican-controlled Senate, allegedly on the condition that Clinton make no more nominations to the federal courts from his state. When Clinton nominated White in 1997 contrary to the previous agreement, Abraham refused to approve her, keeping White's nomination stalled in the Senate Judiciary Committee without a hearing or committee vote. When Clinton later nominated Kathleen McCree Lewis in 1999 to a second Michigan vacancy on the Sixth Circuit, Abraham did not allow her to be processed in committee either.

Despite the delays, being picked to sit on a court just one notch below the U.S. Supreme Court "is like being hit by lightning," White told the Detroit News in an article that was published on October 17, 1999. "To say I'm going to pick up my jacks and go home is self-defeating. Why would I take them off the hook?" White acknowledged to the paper that she had considered withdrawing for "maybe 30 seconds." But at the time the article appeared, White told the paper she believed she would be given a fair hearing. "From everything I've heard, Sen. Abraham is a decent guy," White told the paper. "I have no reason to believe I won't get a hearing."

Ultimately, White's nomination was returned to the White House when Clinton's presidency ended. White's four year nomination remains one of the single longest federal appeals-court judicial nominations never given a full Senate vote, exceeded only by the failed nomination of Bush nominee Terrence Boyle from 2001 to 2007.

=== Renomination to Sixth Circuit under Bush ===
When President George W. Bush took office in 2001, he quickly submitted Republican nominees to fill the two Michigan vacancies that Abraham had refused to allow Clinton to fill. However, Michigan's two Democratic senators, Carl Levin, who was the cousin of White's husband at the time, and Debbie Stabenow, who had defeated Abraham in the 2000 election, consistently tried to block all of Bush's circuit court nominees from Michigan, citing the fact that White and Lewis, the latter of whom eventually died in October 2007, had never received up-or-down votes from the Senate during Clinton's presidency. The two senators were successful in the filibuster of Bush nominee Henry Saad, who later withdrew. But as part of the Gang of 14 deal in May 2005, they finally allowed the confirmation of stalled Bush nominees David McKeague, Richard A. Griffin and Susan Bieke Neilson.

After Neilson's unexpected death in 2006 at the age of 49, there were again two Michigan vacancies on the Sixth Circuit. Bush quickly named Raymond Kethledge and United States Attorney Stephen Murphy III to fill the positions. However, after the Democrats regained control of the Senate in November 2006, Levin and Stabenow once again balked at confirming any further Bush nominees from Michigan to the Sixth Circuit.

On April 15, 2008, as part of a deal with Levin and Stabenow, Bush reluctantly renominated White to the Sixth Circuit, more than eleven years after she was first nominated by Clinton. She replaced Murphy as the nominee to fill Neilson's vacated seat, while Murphy was given a Michigan district court nomination in exchange. In return for White's renomination, Levin and Stabenow agreed to allow Kethledge to be confirmed.

White, along with Kethledge and Murphy, received a hearing before the Senate Judiciary Committee on May 7, 2008, less than a month after her nomination. White was pointedly questioned by Republican senators, who were angry that her nomination had been fast-tracked by the Democratic committee chairman, Senator Patrick Leahy, past several other Bush circuit court nominees who had been waiting in committee for much longer periods of time during the 110th Congress. She was voted out of committee on June 12, 2008 by an 11–8 vote. All of the Republicans on the committee, except Orrin Hatch, the chairman of the committee during the Clinton administration, voted against her purportedly on the grounds that she had not provided the committee with copies of her unpublished judicial opinions that were later reversed by the Michigan Supreme Court. On June 24, 2008, the Senate confirmed her by a 63–32 vote. She received her commission on August 8, 2008.

On December 14, 2021, she announced her intent to assume senior status upon confirmation of her successor. She assumed senior status on June 13, 2022 and was replaced by Stephanie D. Davis.

== See also ==
- Bill Clinton judicial appointment controversies
- George W. Bush judicial appointment controversies

Legal offices
Preceded by Susan Bieke Neilson	Judge of the United States Court of Appeals for the Sixth Circuit; 2008–2022	Succeeded by Stephanie D. Davis
