= S. Elizabeth Gibson =

American lawyer

Sarah Elizabeth Gibson (born 1950) is a law professor at the University of North Carolina School of Law and a former federal judicial nominee to the U.S. Court of Appeals for the Fourth Circuit.

== Early life and education ==
A native of Raleigh, North Carolina, Gibson earned a bachelor's degree cum laude from Duke University in 1972 and a Juris Doctor degree with high honors from the University of North Carolina School of Law in 1976.

== Professional career ==
From 1976 until 1977, Gibson clerked for Fourth Circuit Judge James Braxton Craven Jr. From 1977 until 1978, Gibson clerked for U.S. Supreme Court Justice Byron White. She worked in private practice from 1978 until 1983, when she joined the University of North Carolina School of Law as an associate professor. Gibson became a full professor at the law school in 1988. Gibson also began working as a consultant for the Federal Judicial Center in 1998.

== Nomination to the Fourth Circuit ==
On October 26, 2000, on the recommendation of Sen. John Edwards, President Clinton nominated Gibson to a vacancy on the Fourth Circuit that was created by the death the previous year of Judge Samuel James Ervin III. With just two weeks until the presidential election and opposition to North Carolina appeals-court judicial nominees throughout Clinton's entire presidency by North Carolina Sen. Jesse Helms, Gibson's nomination languished. "The good thing for me is I have a job right now that I love," Gibson told the Raleigh News and Observer in an article that was published on October 28, 2000. "So if this works out, that would be great. If not, that's OK."

Since Gibson was nominated after July 1, 2000, the unofficial start date of the Thurmond Rule during a presidential election year, no hearings were scheduled on her nomination, and the nomination was returned to Clinton at the end of his term. President George W. Bush chose not to renominate Gibson to the Fourth Circuit.

In 2003, President Bush nominated Allyson K. Duncan to the Fourth Circuit seat to which Gibson had been nominated. The U.S. Senate confirmed Duncan later that year.

== Personal ==
Gibson is married to University of North Carolina law professor Robert Mosteller.

== See also ==
- List of law clerks for the sixth seat of the Supreme Court of the United States
- Bill Clinton judicial appointment controversies
