= Stanley Marcus (judge) =

American judge (born 1946)

Senior Judge of the United States Court of Appeals for the Eleventh Circuit
- Incumbent
- Assumed office December 5, 2019

Judge of the United States Court of Appeals for the Eleventh Circuit
- In office November 12, 1997 – December 5, 2019
- Appointed by: Bill Clinton
- Preceded by: Peter T. Fay
- Succeeded by: Barbara Lagoa

Judge of the United States District Court for the Southern District of Florida
- In office July 18, 1985 – November 12, 1997
- Appointed by: Ronald Reagan
- Preceded by: Seat established
- Succeeded by: Patricia A. Seitz

Personal details
- Born: 1946 (age 79–80) New York City, New York, U.S.
- Education: Queens College (BA); Harvard University (JD)

Stanley Marcus (born 1946) is an American jurist who serves as the senior United States circuit judge of the United States Court of Appeals for the Eleventh Circuit. He was previously a former United States District Judge of the United States District Court for the Southern District of Florida.

== Early life, education and legal training ==
Marcus was born and raised in New York City, New York. He earned a Bachelor of Arts degree from Queens College, City University of New York, magna cum laude, in 1967. He earned his Juris Doctor from the Harvard Law School in 1971. Marcus also served on active duty in the United States Army in 1969, and served in the United States Army Reserve through 1974.

== Legal career ==
Marcus clerked for United States District Judge John R. Bartels from 1971 until 1973, and joined the New York law firm of Botein, Hays, Sklar and Herzberg as an associate in 1974. He became an Assistant United States Attorney in Brooklyn in 1975, and in 1978 was assigned to the United States Attorney's Office in Detroit, Michigan as Deputy Chief of the "Detroit Strike Force," which investigated organized crime in Michigan. In 1980, Marcus was appointed the Chief of the Detroit Strike Force, Organized Crime and Racketeering Section of the United States Department of Justice. In 1982, Marcus left Detroit and became the United States Attorney for the Southern District of Florida, in Miami, Florida.

== Federal judicial service ==
Marcus was nominated on June 20, 1985, by President Ronald Reagan to a new seat authorized by 98 Stat. 333 on the United States District Court for the Southern District of Florida. He was confirmed by the United States Senate on July 16, 1985, received his commission on July 18, 1985, and was sworn in on August 16, 1985, according to a September 26, 1997 article in the Fort Lauderdale Sun-Sentinel. His service terminated on November 23, 1997, due to elevation to the court of appeals.

President Bill Clinton nominated Marcus to the United States Court of Appeals for the Eleventh Circuit, to a seat vacated by Judge Peter T. Fay, on September 25, 1997, after a previous Clinton nominee for the seat, Charles "Bud" Stack, had withdrawn his name from consideration after his background was raised as an issue by Bob Dole during the 1996 presidential election. Even though the Senate at that time was controlled by Republicans, Marcus's nomination was considered to be very uncontroversial. The United States Senate Judiciary Committee unanimously voted in favor of Marcus's nomination on November 6, 1997, and the full Senate unanimously confirmed him on November 7, 1997. "I'm deeply honored," Marcus told the Miami Herald in a brief interview in an article that appeared on November 8, 1997. He received his commission on November 12, 1997. He assumed senior status on December 5, 2019.

In 2007 to 2008, future US district judge for the US District Court for the Southern District of Florida Roy Altman served as his law clerk.

Judge Marcus is a member of the Judicial Conference Committee on Federal-State Jurisdiction and has been the committee's chairman since 1992.

== Notable cases ==
In 2004, Marcus dissented when the court refused to rehear a case where the initial panel upheld a law banning LGBTQ couples from adopting children. The vote was 6–6, which warranted a denial of rehearing en banc. Marcus was joined by Gerald Bard Tjoflat and Charles R. Wilson, and Judges Barkett, Anderson, and Dubina filed separate dissents.

In February 2020, Marcus was a member of a 3-judge panel in Jones et al. v. DeSantis, a 2020 voting rights case. 2018 Florida Amendment 4 permitted former felons to vote, however DeSantis signed a law that required former felons to pay all legal fees before being eligible to vote again, despite some of them not knowing how much they owed. District judge Robert Hinkle struck down that law, and the panel kept the injunction against the law. However, the panel was reversed in a sharply divided en banc decision that September.

In the 2021 case Burns v. Palm Beach, Marcus penned a lengthy dissent in which he argued that the First Amendment's protection of artistic expression extends to stylistic choices in residential architecture, subjecting aesthetic zoning measures to heightened constitutional scrutiny.

Marcus was one of 3 judges who ruled that Alabama's proposed redistricting maps were unlawful under Section 2 of the Voting Rights Act. The 3 judge panel's ruling was upheld in Allen v. Milligan.

Legal offices
New seat	Judge of the United States District Court for the Southern District of Florida; 1985–1997	Succeeded by Patricia A. Seitz
Preceded by Peter T. Fay	Judge of the United States Court of Appeals for the Eleventh Circuit; 1997–2019	Succeeded by Barbara Lagoa
