= Enrique Moreno (attorney) =

Mexican-American attorney (1955–2019)

Enrique Moreno (December 28, 1955 – October 10, 2019) was a Mexican-American attorney from El Paso, Texas and once a federal judicial nominee to the U.S. Court of Appeals for the Fifth Circuit.

== Early life and education ==
Born in the city of Chihuahua, Mexico, and the son of a carpenter and a seamstress, Moreno earned a bachelor's degree from Harvard University in 1978 and a J.D. degree from Harvard Law School in 1981.

== Professional career ==
Moreno began his career as a personal injury and product liability attorney in 1981. He has worked for four different law firms in his career. He has been the practitioner of the Law Offices of Enrique Moreno since 1999.

Moreno won several large judgments in his legal career. In August 2001, Moreno was one of five lawyers to win a $55,515,000 judgment for an El Paso man against Kelly-Moore Paints for placing asbestos-containing fibers in a joint compound product that caused pleural mesothelioma in a patient.

On April 12, 2006, Moreno won a $27.5 million judgment for an Iran-born American citizen against Southwest Airlines in a landmark racial profiling case after Southwest's flight attendants had her arrested after she had complained about poor service on the airline.

In 2007, Moreno began leading an anti-corruption group in El Paso called the Citizens' Commission on Best Practices in Government.

== Nomination to the Fifth Circuit ==
On September 16, 1999, President Clinton nominated Moreno to be a judge on the U.S. Court of Appeals for the Fifth Circuit. Moreno was nominated to the vacancy that had been created by Judge William Lockhart Garwood taking senior status. Clinton in 1997 had nominated Jorge Rangel to the seat, but Rangel withdrew his nomination in 1998 after objections from Senate Republicans.

Citing what they called Moreno's lack of experience, both of Texas Republican senators at the time, Phil Gramm and Kay Bailey Hutchison, opposed Moreno's nomination. In May 2000, Clinton publicly denounced the senators, saying that Moreno had "unbelievable academic credentials; he was endorsed by every conceivable professional association." Clinton also suggested that the senators wanted a judicial nominee who was "more politically malleable." For his part, Moreno said in a statement that he had "been blessed with the support and encouragement of many people. I am especially grateful and proud of my community's support for my nomination."

Moreno's nomination became an issue in the 2000 presidential election. At a campaign stop on July 1, 2000, then-Vice President Gore criticized Senate Republicans for holding up Moreno's nomination. "I believe that it is time to call upon Congress to stop playing politics with judicial nominations and confirm Enrique Moreno," Gore said.

Given that the Republicans controlled the U.S. Senate for Clinton's entire second term and given that 2000 was a presidential election year, Moreno's nomination languished. He never received a hearing before the U.S. Senate Judiciary Committee, and the Senate as a result never took a full vote on his nomination. Clinton renominated him on January 3, 2001, but his nomination was withdrawn by President Bush on March 20, 2001, along with 61 other executive and judicial nominations that Clinton had made.

President George W. Bush nominated Priscilla Owen to the seat on the Fifth Circuit in 2001. She won Senate confirmation in 2005.

In 2002, after Democrats recaptured the Senate, Moreno was one of several of Clinton's scuttled judicial nominees to be invited to appear before the Senate Judiciary Committee to discuss the process. Moreno told the committee that "I am often asked if I am personally disappointed or bitter about my experience. Let me say that I am not. You see, I have received so much encouragement, support, good will, and kindness from so many sources. It would be an act of selfishness for anyone who has experienced what I have experienced to say that they have a right to be personally disappointed. I am not personally disappointed. I am disappointed for my community, for the many people that supported my nomination, and for the many people that identified with my nomination. With all due respect, I believe that they deserved better."

== Death ==
Moreno died from complications of cancer on October 10, 2019.
