= Priscilla Richman =

American judge (born 1954)

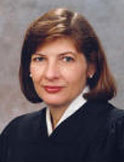

Chief Judge of the United States Court of Appeals for the Fifth Circuit
- In office October 1, 2019 – October 4, 2024
- Preceded by: Carl E. Stewart
- Succeeded by: Jennifer Walker Elrod

Judge of the United States Court of Appeals for the Fifth Circuit
- Incumbent
- Assumed office June 3, 2005
- Appointed by: George W. Bush
- Preceded by: William Garwood

Justice of the Texas Supreme Court
- In office January 1, 1995 – June 6, 2005
- Preceded by: Lloyd Doggett
- Succeeded by: Don Willett

Personal details
- Born: 1954 (age 71–72) Palacios, Texas, U.S.
- Party: Republican
- Spouse: Nathan Hecht (m. 2022)
- Education: University of Texas, Austin (attended); Baylor University (BA, JD)

Priscilla Richman (formerly Priscilla Richman Owen; born 1954) is an American lawyer and jurist serving as a United States circuit judge of the United States Court of Appeals for the Fifth Circuit. She served as Chief Judge of that court from 2019 to 2024. She was previously a justice of the Supreme Court of Texas from 1995 to 2005.

== Early life and education ==
Priscilla Richman was born in Palacios, Texas. Her earliest years were spent on her family's farm in Collegeport. She later grew up and went to school in Waco. She worked part-time during high school and college at her stepfather's insurance company. During summers, she returned to Collegeport, working in rice fields and herding cattle.

Richman started college at the University of Texas at Austin and later transferred to Baylor University to be near her family in Waco. She earned a Bachelor of Arts degree, cum laude, from Baylor. She then went to Baylor Law School, where she became editor of the Baylor Law Review and graduated cum laude in 1977, receiving a Juris Doctor. From among approximately 400 examinees, at age 23, she received the highest score on the December 1977 Texas bar examination.

== Career ==
After graduating from law school, Richman joined Andrews & Kurth in Houston, specializing in oil and gas litigation. She made partner at the age of 30. In private practice, Richman handled a broad range of civil matters at the trial and appellate levels. She was admitted to practice before various state and federal trial courts and appellate courts. She is a member of the American Law Institute, the American Judicature Society, the American Bar Association, and a Fellow of the American and Houston Bar Foundations.

=== Texas Supreme Court ===
In 1993, after 17 years at Andrews & Kurth, she was asked to run for the Texas Supreme Court as a Republican. She won with 53 percent of the vote, promising to restore integrity and dignity to a court tainted by scandal.

Richman had written articles and lobbied the Texas Legislature to eliminate partisan election of judges, arguing that they hinder the ability of courts to provide impartial justice. When she was up for reelection in 2000, Democrats did not put up an opponent against her, and she was returned to office with 84 percent of the vote, defeating a Libertarian opponent with the help of endorsements from newspapers statewide.

Richman served on the board of Texas Hearing and Service Dogs, which rescues dogs from pounds, provides training for them, and then gives the dogs to disabled people who cannot otherwise afford them. In addition, she was a founding member of the St. Barnabas Episcopal Mission in Austin and has taught Sunday school.

In the mid-1990s, Congress reduced funding for the Legal Services Corporation. Richman was part of a committee that successfully encouraged the Texas Legislature to enact legislation that has resulted in millions of dollars per year in additional funds for providers of legal services to the poor.

Richman served as the Texas Supreme Court's representative on the Court-Annexed Mediation Task Force, working to resolve differences between lawyer and non-lawyer mediators, in order to provide an alternative to expensive courtroom trials. She has been a member of the Gender Bias Reform Implementation Committee and statewide committees regarding legal services to the poor and pro bono legal services.

Richman also served on the boards of advisors of the Houston and Austin Chapters of the Federalist Society. Richman was instrumental in organizing a group known as Family Law 2000 that seeks to find ways to educate parents about the effect that divorce can have on their children and to lessen the adversarial nature of legal proceedings when a marriage is dissolved.

=== Federal judicial service ===
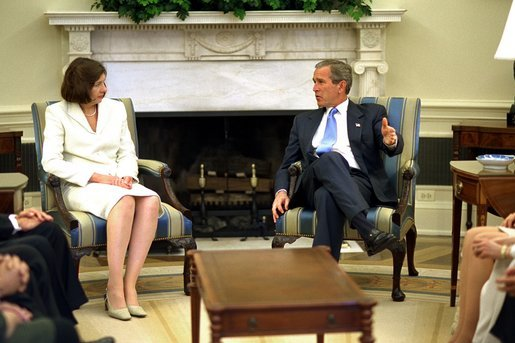
Richman meets with President George W. Bush in 2002

Richman was nominated on May 9, 2001, by President George W. Bush to fill a vacancy on the Fifth Circuit created by Judge William Lockhart Garwood, who assumed senior status on January 23, 1997. Senate Democrats immediately decided to block her nomination for two reasons. First, the Democrats were angry that two previous nominees who President Clinton had nominated to Garwood's empty seat, Jorge Rangel and Enrique Moreno, were never given hearings by the United States Senate during Clinton's second term because the Senate was controlled by Republicans at the time. Second, they considered her to be too conservative. As a result, the Senate Judiciary Committee, which was controlled by Senate Democrats during the 107th Congress, voted 10-9 along party lines against advancing Richman's nomination to a full Senate vote. In 2003, after Republicans had taken the Senate back, Democrats filibustered her. In 2005, after Republicans picked up four more seats in the Senate during the 109th Congress, her nomination was again considered.

Richman had considerable judicial experience as a member of the Texas Supreme Court, and had been rated "Well-Qualified" (highest possible) by the American Bar Association for the Fifth Circuit position. According to ABC News reporter Jan Crawford Greenburg, Senate Democrats strategically "targeted outspoken conservatives who were potential Supreme Court picks....their successes in filibustering women, Hispanics, and African Americans in 2003 undermined Bush's plans to replace [retiring U.S. Supreme Court Associate Justice Sandra Day O'Connor] with another woman or a minority." Supporters of the Richman nomination asserted that her criticized rulings were often near-unanimous, or simply followed federal precedents. Richman was touted as a judicial conservative who would, in the words of President Bush, "interpret the law, not legislate from the bench."

Opponents, however, criticized her for what they claimed were her conservative positions on contentious social and economic issues, and pro-corporate decisions. Democratic Senator Edward Kennedy said President Bush's appointee for Attorney General, Alberto Gonzales, during his service with Richman on the Texas Supreme Court had frequently criticized Richman; Kennedy said Gonzales argued one of Richman's positions taken in dissent would "judicially amend" a statute for the benefit of manufacturers selling defective products. On abortion, Richman was criticized by pro-choice groups for her interpretation of Texas's parental-notification law, and for joining a majority decision on overrides only once.

In May 2005, a compromise was arranged by a bipartisan group of moderate senators called the Gang of 14, which allowed for Richman to finally be given a full Senate vote. On May 24, 2005, cloture was invoked on her nomination by an 81–18 vote. She was finally confirmed by a 55–43 vote on May 25, 2005. Richman was the third judge nominated by Bush to the Fifth Circuit and confirmed by the United States Senate. She received her commission on June 3, 2005. She has served as the circuit's Chief Judge from 2019 to 2024.

=== Possible Supreme Court nomination ===
In 2005, Richman was often cited as a potential Bush Supreme Court nominee to replace retired justice Sandra Day O'Connor. On September 17, 2005, Minority Leader Harry Reid informed Majority Leader Bill Frist that Richman would be filibustered if she were nominated for the Supreme Court, but Frist believed at the time that Richman could still be confirmed in the face of a filibuster.

== Notable opinions ==
In June 2015, Richman joined Judge Carolyn Dineen King in reversing an unconditional writ of habeas corpus granted to Albert Woodfox, one of the Angola Three inmates at the Louisiana State Penitentiary. The ruling, which held that Judge James Joseph Brady of the United States District Court for the Middle District of Louisiana abused his discretion in issuing the writ, kept 69-year-old Woodfox in solitary confinement at the penitentiary until his release on February 19, 2016. In 2010, Richman joined Emilio M. Garza and Edith Brown Clement in affirming the dismissal of the complaint in Doe v. Silsbee Independent School District. The plaintiff ("H.S.") was a cheerleader who was ordered by her high school to cheer for her alleged rapist, a basketball player named Rakheem Bolton. H.S. refused and was kicked off the team. She sued, claiming a violation of her First Amendment right to free speech. The Eastern District of Texas Judge Thad Heartfield granted the school district's motion to dismiss, and Judges Clement, Garza, and Richman affirmed. H.S. was ordered to pay the school $45,000 in legal fees for filing a "frivolous" lawsuit.

== Personal life ==
In April 2022, Richman married Nathan Hecht, chief justice of the Texas Supreme Court. Richman announced she would resume using her maiden name.

== See also ==
- George W. Bush judicial appointment controversies
- George W. Bush Supreme Court candidates

== Footnotes ==
Legal offices
Preceded by William Lockhart Garwood	Judge of the United States Court of Appeals for the Fifth Circuit; 2005–present	Incumbent
Preceded by Carl E. Stewart	Chief Judge of the United States Court of Appeals for the Fifth Circuit; 2019–2024	Succeeded by Jennifer Walker Elrod
