= Frederica Massiah-Jackson =

American judge (1950–2025)

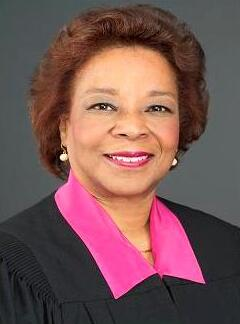
Frederica Massiah-Jackson

Frederica Anne Massiah-Jackson (November 10, 1950 – August 27, 2025) was an American judge who served on the Philadelphia County Court of Common Pleas. She was elected President Judge of that court in 2000 and served in that role until 2006.

== Life and career ==
Massiah-Jackson was born in Philadelphia on November 10, 1950. She graduated from the Philadelphia High School for Girls in three years at the age of 16. She also graduated from Chestnut Hill College in three years and the University of Pennsylvania Law School in 1974 at the age of 23.

Following law school, she was a law clerk for Pennsylvania Supreme Court Justice Robert N.C. Nix, Jr. who later became Chief Justice of that court. She joined the Philadelphia firm Blank Rome Comisky & McCauley in 1976 and stayed with the firm until her election to the bench in 1983.

Judge Massiah-Jackson presided over medical malpractice and products liability cases, complex commercial litigation and personal injury matters. She also worked with the Senate of Pennsylvania as Chief Counsel for the Senate Insurance and Business Committee. Judge Massiah-Jackson was a Lecturer at the Wharton School of the University of Pennsylvania from 1992 to 2002, where she taught Legal Studies and Business Law.

== Nomination to the Federal Bench ==
On July 31, 1997, President Bill Clinton nominated her to be a judge of the United States District Court for the Eastern District of Pennsylvania. She failed to provide timely information to the Committee on the Judiciary. Her nomination was opposed by conservatives (such as editors at National Review and Ann Coulter) and law enforcement agencies, including the Fraternal Order of Police and National Association of Police Organizations. These groups charged that she was biased against whites and law enforcement agents, lacked a judicial temperament, and gave extraordinarily lenient sentences. Her proponents charged that these accusations were mainly fueled by right-wing politics and racism. On March 16, 1998, the day before the scheduled United States Senate vote on her nomination, the nomination was withdrawn.

== Tenure as President Judge ==
During her years as President Judge (2001–2006), the First Judicial District administered justice with a $110 million overall budget, 2500 employees and 130 judges. Among many projects, the President Judge Emerita coordinated court employee appreciation events, increased the pay rates for court-appointed counsel fees, signed a Mitigation Protocol for representation in death penalty cases, opened the First Judicial District Information Center, expanded the District's Judicial Education initiatives, and implemented programs to promote race and gender fairness within the District's courtrooms.

In 2011, Philadelphia's Mural Arts program partnered with Universal Companies to include the judge on a mural entitled "The Faces That Shape Us". Judge Massiah-Jackson received the 2010 NAACP's Cecil B. Moore Award. In 2007, the judge's portrait was presented to the courts and has been hung in the Ceremonial Courtroom of the Philadelphia City Hall. In 2006, she was chosen by the Pennsylvania Commission for Women as one of 50 women of color role models profiled in the book Voices. In 2005, she co-hosted Philadelphia's first Urban Courts Conference. She sat on the boards of the Philadelphia Center for Literacy, Scribe Video Center, and Eagleville Hospital in Montgomery County, Pennsylvania, and was a member of the Forum of Executive Women. She was a member and Past President of the Delaware Valley, Pa. chapter of The LINKS, Incorporated, and was a member of Alpha Kappa Alpha sorority. Judge Massiah-Jackson has received numerous awards and recognitions of service.

In November 2020, Judge Massiah-Jackson announced that she would retire from the Court of Common Pleas in January 2021.

== Personal life and death ==
Massiah-Jackson was the mother of Dr. Julia L. Jackson and Thomas H. Jackson, IV.

Massiah-Jackson died in Virginia on August 27, 2025, at the age of 74.
