= Elizabeth Gibson (nurse) =

- Occupation: Nurse
- Military career
- Allegiance: United States
- Branch: Army
- Service years: 1861–1865
- Conflicts: American Civil War: Battle of Shiloh; Battle of Vicksburg

Elizabeth Gibson was a Union nurse during the American Civil War. On October 1, 1861, Gibson received orders from Dorothea Dix to report to St. Louis, Missouri as soon as possible. The very next day, Gibson was sent to duty her upon arrival; she was assigned to the surgical ward of Fifth Street Military Hospital, where she would serve for twenty-one months. On July 24, 1863, Gibson moved downriver to the Jefferson Barracks, only to be transferred again on October 26 to the Harvey General Hospital in Madison, Wisconsin.

Gibson served at the battles of Shiloh and Vicksburg. After Vicksburg, she was working on a hospital ship to transport wounded personnel which came under fire, though the passengers and crew were all unharmed. In a letter to Mary G. Holland, Gibson said with pride that despite serving for four years, she only fainted one time. When asked to describe her service, she wrote "I count it a high honor to have been an army nurse, and a great privilege to have ministered to the noble men of the volunteer army."

Gibson was discharged from service on October 13, 1865 and moved to Cincinnati, Ohio.
