= Albert Diaz (judge) =

American judge (born 1960)

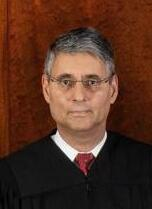
- Diaz in 2022

Chief Judge of the United States Court of Appeals for the Fourth Circuit
- Incumbent
- Assumed office July 8, 2023
- Preceded by: Roger Gregory

Judge of the United States Court of Appeals for the Fourth Circuit
- Incumbent
- Assumed office December 22, 2010
- Appointed by: Barack Obama
- Preceded by: William Walter Wilkins

Personal details
- Born: 1960 (age 65–66) New York City, New York, U.S.
- Education: University of Pennsylvania (BS); New York University (JD); Boston University (MS)

Albert Diaz (born 1960) is an American lawyer who is the chief circuit judge of the United States Court of Appeals for the Fourth Circuit. Diaz is the first Hispanic judge to serve on the Fourth Circuit. Prior to his appointment to the Court of Appeals, Diaz was a North Carolina state superior court judge and an appellate judge for the Navy-Marine Corps Court of Criminal Appeals.

== Early life and education ==
Raised in Brooklyn as the son of divorced Puerto Rican parents, Diaz and his two brothers were raised by his mother. After graduating high school, he enlisted in the U.S. Marines. Diaz earned a Bachelor of Science degree in economics from the Wharton School of the University of Pennsylvania in 1983 and earned a Juris Doctor from New York University School of Law in 1988. Diaz earned a Master of Science degree from Boston University, in 1993. Diaz also served with the Marines from 1988 to 1995 as a judge advocate, retiring as a lieutenant colonel, USMCR.

== Professional career ==
While in the Marines, Diaz served as a prosecutor, defense lawyer and judge. He left the service in 1995 for private practice, becoming an associate with the law firm of Hunton & Williams and represented Philip Morris USA during tobacco lawsuits in the late 1990s. From 2000 to 2005, he served as a military judge for the U.S. Navy-Marine Corps Trial Judiciary and as an appellate judge for the U.S. Navy-Marine Corps Court of Criminal Appeals.

== Judicial career ==
=== State court service ===
In 2001, then-North Carolina Governor Mike Easley appointed Diaz to the Mecklenburg County Superior Court, making Diaz the first Hispanic person ever to be a state judge in North Carolina. The following year, Diaz lost a bid for election. However, Easley again appointed Diaz to the Superior Court. Then, in 2005, the North Carolina Supreme Court chief justice appointed Diaz to be Charlotte, North Carolina's first ever Business Court judge, one of just three in the state. Diaz served as a Business Court Representative to the American Bar Association’s Business Law Section.

=== Federal judicial service ===
On November 4, 2009, President Barack Obama nominated Diaz to be a United States circuit judge of the United States Court of Appeals for the Fourth Circuit, to replace Judge William Walter Wilkins, who assumed senior status in July 2007 and later retired.

The nomination, made along with that of fellow North Carolina nominee James Andrew Wynn, was jointly endorsed by North Carolina U.S. Senators Kay Hagan, a Democrat, and Richard Burr, a Republican. He had a hearing before the Committee on December 16, 2009. He was heard along with fellow nominee James Andrew Wynn by just three of the Committee members. When asked about his judicial philosophy, Diaz said: "We're not simply dealing with an academic exercise, but we're affecting people's lives in each and every case". The Senate Judiciary Committee voted 19–0 on January 28, 2010, to send his nomination to the Senate floor.

A combination of secret holds and the threat of filibuster by Republicans caused Democratic Senate Majority Leader Harry Reid not to bring Diaz's confirmation to a vote for nearly eleven months. On December 18, 2010, the Senate confirmed Diaz by a voice vote. He received his commission on December 22, 2010. He became chief judge on July 8, 2023.

=== Notable rulings ===
In August 2020, Diaz wrote for the unanimous panel when it upheld the convictions of Rise Above Movement rioters at the 2017 Unite the Right rally in Charlottesville, Virginia because any unconstitutionally overbroad elements of the Anti-Riot Act were fully severable.

== See also ==
- List of Hispanic and Latino American jurists
- List of first minority male lawyers and judges in New York
- List of Puerto Ricans

Legal offices
Preceded by William Walter Wilkins	Judge of the United States Court of Appeals for the Fourth Circuit; 2010–present	Incumbent
Preceded by Roger Gregory	Chief Judge of the United States Court of Appeals for the Fourth Circuit; 2023–present	Incumbent
