= Allyson K. Duncan =

American judge (born 1951)

Allyson Duncan
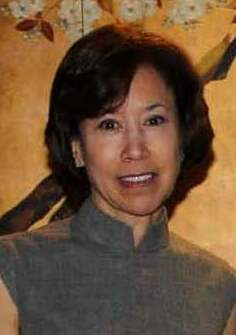
- Duncan in 2012

Senior Judge of the United States Court of Appeals for the Fourth Circuit
- In office March 21, 2019 – July 31, 2019

Judge of the United States Court of Appeals for the Fourth Circuit
- In office August 15, 2003 – March 21, 2019
- Appointed by: George W. Bush
- Preceded by: Samuel James Ervin III
- Succeeded by: Allison Jones Rushing

Personal details
- Born: September 5, 1951 (age 75) Durham, North Carolina, U.S.
- Party: Republican
- Education: Hampton University (BA); Duke University (JD)

Allyson Kay Duncan (born September 5, 1951, in Durham, North Carolina) is a former United States circuit judge of the United States Court of Appeals for the Fourth Circuit. She was the Fourth Circuit's first female African American judge.

== Background ==
Duncan received a Bachelor of Arts degree from Hampton University in 1972 and a Juris Doctor from Duke University School of Law in 1975. She was an associate editor at the Lawyers Co-Operative Publishing Company from 1976 to 1977. Duncan then served for one year as a law clerk to Judge Julia Cooper Mack of the District of Columbia Court of Appeals from 1977 to 1978.

In 1978, Duncan joined the staff of the Equal Employment Opportunity Commission. By the time she left in 1986, she had served in a variety of important posts at the commission: appellate attorney, assistant to the deputy general counsel, assistant to the chairman, acting associate legal counsel, and acting legal counsel. At one point, the then-head of the EEOC, Clarence Thomas, promoted Duncan as his Chief of Staff over another candidate, Anita Hill.

At North Carolina Central University School of Law, Duncan served as an associate professor from 1986 to 1990, teaching property law, appellate advocacy, and employment discrimination. In 1990, she served briefly on the North Carolina Court of Appeals as an Associate Judge. She was appointed by Governor James G. Martin to replace Charles Becton but lost the following election to James A. Wynn.

Duncan was appointed a Commissioner of the North Carolina Utilities Commission in 1991 and remained in that post until 1998, when she joined the Raleigh office of Kilpatrick Stockton as a partner. She worked there until her appointment to the federal bench. Duncan became the first African-American president of the North Carolina Bar Association in 2003.

== Federal judicial service ==
Duncan was nominated on April 28, 2003, by President George W. Bush to fill a vacancy on the Fourth Circuit created by Judge Samuel James Ervin III, who died on September 18, 1999. A Republican, Duncan was supported by both Senators Elizabeth Dole and John Edwards, a departure from the trend toward partisan controversy over North Carolina appointments to the Fourth Circuit Court of Appeals. Bill Clinton previously had nominated Professor S. Elizabeth Gibson to the seat late in his presidency, but Gibson never received a U.S. Senate Judiciary Committee hearing or vote before his presidency ended. The United States Senate confirmed Duncan by a 93–0 vote on July 17, 2003. She was the third judge nominated to the Fourth Circuit by Bush and confirmed by the Senate. She received her commission on August 15, 2003.

In May 2018, Duncan announced that she would assume senior status upon the confirmation of her successor. In September 2018, President Donald Trump nominated Allison Jones Rushing to replace Duncan on the 4th Circuit Court. Rushing was confirmed by the Senate on March 5, 2019. Duncan assumed senior status on March 21, 2019, and retired on July 31, 2019.

== See also ==
- List of African-American federal judges
- List of African-American jurists
- List of first women lawyers and judges in North Carolina

Legal offices
Preceded by Samuel James Ervin III	Judge of the United States Court of Appeals for the Fourth Circuit; 2003–2019	Succeeded by Allison Jones Rushing
