= Kathleen McCree Lewis =

American lawyer (1947–2007)

Personal details
- Born: Kathleen Louise McCree; September 27, 1947 Boston, Massachusetts, U.S.
- Died: October 16, 2007 (aged 60) Detroit, Michigan, U.S.
- Spouse: David Baker Lewis
- Education: University of Michigan (BA, JD)

Kathleen McCree Lewis (September 27, 1947 – October 16, 2007) was an American lawyer and former federal judicial nominee to the United States Court of Appeals for the Sixth Circuit.

== Early life and education ==
Lewis was born in Boston. Lewis' father, Wade H. McCree, was the U.S. Solicitor General from 1977 until 1981. He also was a federal appeals court judge himself, having been appointed to the Sixth Circuit by President Lyndon B. Johnson in 1966 and serving on the Sixth Circuit until his appointment as Solicitor General. After graduating from Detroit's Cass Technical High School (where she was a member of its state championship debate team), Lewis earned a bachelor's degree in political science from the University of Michigan in 1969 and a Juris Doctor (J.D.) degree from the University of Michigan Law School in 1973.

== Professional career ==
In 1973, Lewis joined the Dykema Gossett law firm in Detroit, rising to become a partner at the firm and serving as the firm's appellate litigation specialist.

== Nomination to the Sixth Circuit ==
Lewis first was considered for a different vacancy on the Sixth Circuit. In 1995, her name appeared on the short list to replace retiring Judge Damon Keith, according to a March 20, 1995 article in Crain's Detroit Business. Ultimately, however, President Bill Clinton chose to fill that vacancy by nominating Helene White to that vacancy; White never was confirmed, however. Clinton earlier had nominated another contender for Keith's former seat, Eric L. Clay, to a different vacancy on the Sixth Circuit, and Clay was confirmed easily.

On September 16, 1999, President Clinton nominated Lewis to the Sixth Circuit vacancy created by the retirement of Judge Cornelia Groefsema Kennedy. "I'm thrilled and I feel very honored," Lewis told the Detroit Free Press in an article that appeared on September 17, 1999.

With the U.S. Senate controlled by Republicans during the final two years of Clinton's presidency, Lewis' nomination languished before being returned to the White House when Clinton's presidency ended, chiefly because of objections from Michigan's Republican senator, Spencer Abraham.

In 2001, President Bush nominated Susan Bieke Neilson to the Sixth Circuit seat to which Lewis had been nominated. Neilson's nomination languished for close to four years before she was confirmed in late 2005. Neilson died of cancer just two and a half months after her Senate confirmation.

== Life after the failed nomination ==
Lewis continued working at Dykema Gossett after her nomination was withdrawn. She was named one of Michigan's top 10 lawyers of 2006 by Michigan Lawyers Weekly magazine. In an interview for that issue, Lewis told the magazine that service to her community was part of her essence. "Both of my parents were very active in the community as I was growing up, and from that I think I perceived that responsible grownups serve their communities in a voluntary capacity," she told the magazine. "It never occurred to me not to serve."

== Illness and death ==
Lewis had battled breast cancer for 12 years. Despite the fact that she had never smoked, doctors found lung cancer in 2005, and she died of an inoperable tumor on her lung on October 16, 2007. Kathleen McCree Lewis died at the age of 60, on the same day that her husband David Baker Lewis' mother, Dorothy Baker Lewis, died at age 92.

== See also ==
- Bill Clinton judicial appointment controversies
