= Peter T. Fay =

American judge (1929–2021)

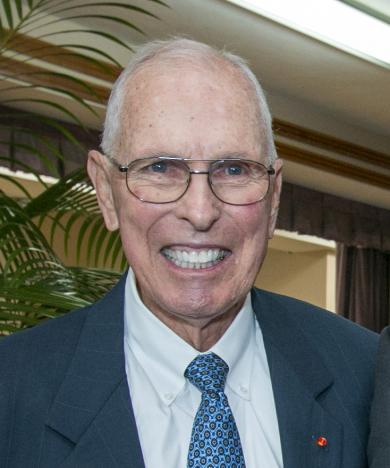

Senior Judge of the United States Court of Appeals for the Eleventh Circuit
- In office January 19, 1994 – January 31, 2021

Judge of the United States Court of Appeals for the Eleventh Circuit
- In office October 1, 1981 – January 19, 1994
- Appointed by: operation of law
- Preceded by: Seat established by 94 Stat. 1994
- Succeeded by: Stanley Marcus

Judge of the United States Court of Appeals for the Fifth Circuit
- In office September 21, 1976 – October 1, 1981
- Appointed by: Gerald Ford
- Preceded by: David W. Dyer
- Succeeded by: Seat abolished

Judge of the United States District Court for the Southern District of Florida
- In office October 16, 1970 – October 8, 1976
- Appointed by: Richard Nixon
- Preceded by: Seat established by 84 Stat. 294
- Succeeded by: William Hoeveler

Personal details
- Born: Peter Thorp Fay; January 18, 1929 Rochester, New York, U.S.
- Died: January 31, 2021 (aged 92) Miami, Florida, U.S.
- Cause of death: Natural Causes
- Education: Rollins College (BA); Fredric G. Levin College of Law (JD)

Peter Thorp Fay (January 18, 1929 – January 31, 2021) was a United States circuit judge of the United States Court of Appeals for the Eleventh Circuit. He was previously a United States district judge of the United States District Court for the Southern District of Florida. At the time of his death, he was one of 26 federal judges to have served for fifty years.

== Early life and career ==
Fay was born in Rochester, New York, on January 18, 1929. He received his Bachelor of Arts degree in 1951 from Rollins College. He served in the United States Air Force as a lieutenant from 1951 to 1953, before attending the Fredric G. Levin College of Law at the University of Florida, where he received his Juris Doctor in 1956. Fay was in private practice in Miami, Florida from 1956 to 1970. Fay practiced at Patton & Kanner in 1956, Nichols, Gaither, Green, Frates & Beckham from 1956 to 1961, and Frates, Fay, Floyd & Pearson from 1961 to 1970.

== Federal judicial service ==
Fay was nominated by Richard Nixon to the United States District Court for the Southern District of Florida on October 7, 1970, to a new seat created by 84 Stat. 294. He was confirmed by the United States Senate on October 13, 1970, and received his commission three days later. Fay delivered an address to the Conference of Chief Justices in August 1973. He discussed state–federal issues, specifically the proposal of having state and federal judges sitting together on a case in order to save time and judicial resources. Fay's service terminated on October 8, 1976, due to elevation to the Fifth Circuit.

Fay was nominated by Gerald Ford to the United States Court of Appeals for the Fifth Circuit on June 11, 1976, to the seat vacated by Judge David W. Dyer. He was confirmed by the Senate on September 17, 1976, and received his commission four days later. Fay was reassigned to the United States Court of Appeals for the Eleventh Circuit, to a new seat authorized by 94 Stat. 1994, on October 1, 1981, by operation of law. He assumed senior status on January 19, 1994.

Paul Huck, a fellow judge, recounted how Fay employed "generous wording" in his opinions. This was the case even when he overturned the ruling of a judge from a lower court. Fay also had the "unique ability" of making lawyers content with his judgments, even if they were on the losing side.

The New York Times reported in February 2015 that potential Republican Party 2016 presidential candidate Jeb Bush lobbied his father, George H. W. Bush, to appoint Fay to the Supreme Court of the United States. The younger Bush did this in a letter sent on August 7, 1989.

== Later life ==
Even after becoming a senior judge, Fay expressed his intention not to retire. St. Thomas University School of Law announced in February 2019 that the school was to be renamed in his honor. Several months before his death, he became only the 26th federal judge to serve fifty years in that capacity. The Eleventh Circuit wrote a feature covering Fay in celebration of the milestone. It stated, "Few judges have served our country for so long and in such an honorable and distinguished manner. Judge Fay continues to perform substantial work for the Court of Appeals and the citizens of the Eleventh Circuit."

== Personal life ==
Fay was married to his wife, Pat, for 62 years until his death. They adopted three children from the Catholic Charities Adoption Services. He was talented in sports, and was inducted into the Rollins College Sports Hall of Fame for water skiing, basketball, and football in 1977.

Fay died on January 31, 2021, in South Miami-Dade, at the age of 92.

== See also ==
- List of United States federal judges by longevity of service

Legal offices
Preceded by Seat established by 84 Stat. 294	Judge of the United States District Court for the Southern District of Florida; 1970–1976	Succeeded by William Hoeveler
Preceded by David W. Dyer	Judge of the United States Court of Appeals for the Fifth Circuit; 1976–1981	Succeeded by Seat abolished
Preceded by Seat established by 94 Stat. 1994	Judge of the United States Court of Appeals for the Eleventh Circuit; 1981–1994	Succeeded by Stanley Marcus
