= Michael F. Easley Jr. =

American lawyer (born 1985)

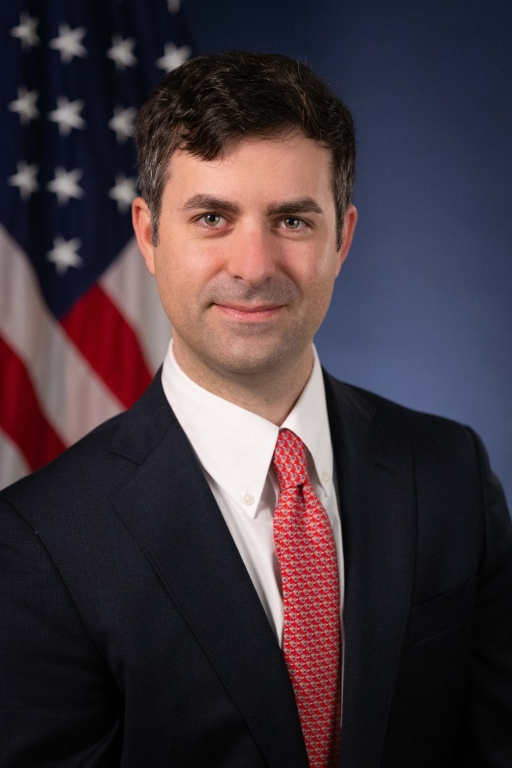

United States Attorney for the Eastern District of North Carolina
- In office November 26, 2021 – February 3, 2025
- President: Joe Biden; Donald Trump
- Preceded by: Robert Higdon Jr. G. Norman Acker (acting)
- Succeeded by: William Ellis Boyle

Personal details
- Born: Michael Francis Easley Jr. 1985 (age 40–41) Wilmington, North Carolina, U.S.
- Party: Democratic
- Parent(s): Mike Easley; Mary Pipines
- Education: University of North Carolina at Chapel Hill (BA, JD)

Michael Francis Easley Jr. (born 1985) is an American lawyer who previously served as the United States attorney for the Eastern District of North Carolina.

== Education ==
Easley received his Bachelor of Arts, with honors and distinction, from the University of North Carolina at Chapel Hill in 2007 and his Juris Doctor, with honors, from the University of North Carolina School of Law in 2010.

== Career ==
From 2010 to 2021, he was a litigation partner at the law firm of McGuireWoods. His practice focused on government investigations and a range of civil and criminal matters in both state and federal courts.

Easley was a member of the Criminal Justice Act Panel for the Eastern District of North Carolina, through which he provided legal representation to indigent clients under federal indictment or investigation. He served as a council member for the Criminal Justice Section of the North Carolina Bar Association and as a member of the Board of Visitors of the University of North Carolina. He previously served on the Board of Directors for North Carolina's Tenth Judicial District Bar and the Wake County Bar Association.

He resumed private practice at McGuireWoods, in March 2025, as the managing partner of its Raleigh office, following his February resignation from public office.

=== U.S. attorney for the Eastern District of North Carolina ===
On September 28, 2021, President Joe Biden nominated Easley to be the United States attorney for the Eastern District of North Carolina. On October 28, 2021, his nomination was reported out of committee by a voice vote. On November 17, 2021, his nomination was confirmed in the United States Senate by voice vote. He was sworn in on November 26, 2021, by Judge James C. Dever III. He resigned on February 3, 2025, returning to McGuireWoods.

During his tenure, Easley expanded the district's prosecutorial and investigative resources, securing a National Public Safety Partnership designation for Raleigh, and increasing the number of federal prosecutors by nearly 17%. Easley launched a Violent Crime Action Plan (VCAP) to target violent crime and gun trafficking through coordinated joint federal and local law enforcement task forces, during which time homicides fell by double digits across multiple cities including Raleigh, Fayetteville, Wilmington, and Rocky Mount.

Under Easley's leadership, the district also significantly expanded its specialized enforcement areas. His administration oversaw a 115% increase in white-collar crime enforcement. He established an Illicit Finance Task Force to combat transnational money laundering through the American financial system, and a Raleigh-based Disruptive Technology Strike Force cell focused on national security and preventing the unlawful acquisition of advanced technology by foreign adversaries.

Easley served on the Attorney General’s Advisory Committee for White Collar Fraud and participated in developing the nationwide corporate voluntary self-disclosure policy announced for United States Attorneys’ Offices in February 2023.

Easley also established a dedicated civil rights team, including human-trafficking task forces in Raleigh and Wilmington, bringing together law enforcement, prosecutors, and community partners to rescue victims and prosecute offenders.

During Easley’s tenure, the office prosecuted five defendants associated with a white-supremacist plot to attack electrical infrastructure. In a separate healthcare-fraud case, a physician was sentenced to 25 years in prison after convictions for medical-device adulteration, fraud, and conspiracy.

== Personal life ==
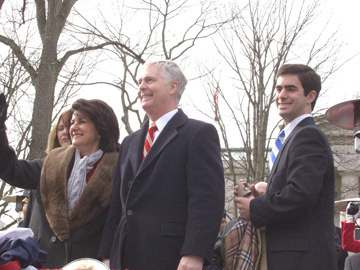
Easley (right) with his parents at his father's inauguration in 2005

Easley is the son of former North Carolina Governor Mike Easley and former First Lady Mary Pipines.

Legal offices
Preceded by Robert Higdon Jr. G. Norman Acker; Acting	United States Attorney for the Eastern District of North Carolina; 2021–present	Incumbent
