= James Carroll Fox =

American judge (1928–2019)

Senior Judge of the United States District Court for the Eastern District of North Carolina
- In office January 31, 2001 – March 23, 2019

Chief Judge of the United States District Court for the Eastern District of North Carolina
- In office 1990–1997
- Preceded by: William Earl Britt
- Succeeded by: Terrence Boyle

Judge of the United States District Court for the Eastern District of North Carolina
- In office September 30, 1982 – January 31, 2001
- Appointed by: Ronald Reagan
- Preceded by: Seat established by 92 Stat. 1629
- Succeeded by: Louise Flanagan

Personal details
- Born: November 6, 1928 Atchison, Kansas
- Died: March 23, 2019 (aged 90) Wilmington, North Carolina
- Education: University of North Carolina (B.S.); University of North Carolina School of Law (J.D.)

James Carroll Fox (November 6, 1928 – March 23, 2019) was a United States district judge of the United States District Court for the Eastern District of North Carolina.

== Education and career ==
Fox was born in Atchison, Kansas and graduated from Woodberry Forest School in 1946. He received a Bachelor of Science degree from the University of North Carolina in 1950. He was in the United States Army Reserves from 1951 to 1959 and became a Corporal. He then received a Juris Doctor from the University of North Carolina School of Law in 1957, serving as a law clerk to Judge Donnell Gilliam of the United States District Court for the Eastern District of North Carolina from 1957 to 1958. He was in private practice in Wilmington, North Carolina, from 1958 to 1982, and was also a county attorney of New Hanover County, North Carolina from 1967 to 1981.

== Federal judicial service ==
On September 14, 1982, Fox was nominated by President Ronald Reagan to a new United States District Court for the Eastern District of North Carolina seat created by 92 Stat. 1629. He was confirmed by the United States Senate on September 29, 1982, and received his commission on September 30, 1982. He served as Chief Judge from 1990 to 1997, and assumed senior status on January 31, 2001. Fox retired into inactive senior status on March 31, 2017, meaning that while he remained a federal judge, he no longer heard cases or participated in the business of the court. He died on March 23, 2019, in Wilmington, North Carolina.

== Sources ==
Legal offices
Preceded by Seat established by 92 Stat. 1629	Judge of the United States District Court for the Eastern District of North Carolina; 1982–2001	Succeeded by Louise Flanagan
Preceded by William Earl Britt	Chief Judge of the United States District Court for the Eastern District of North Carolina; 1990–1997	Succeeded by Terrence Boyle
