= Herbert F. Seawell =

American judge (1869–1949)

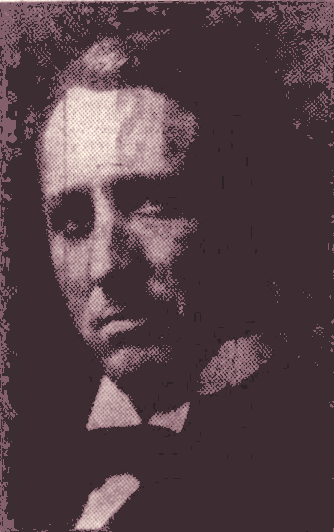
Seawell c. 1920

Herbert Floyd Seawell (August 8, 1869 – February 15, 1949) was a North Carolina lawyer and politician who served as the United States Attorney for the Eastern District of North Carolina from 1910 to 1914, and judge of the United States Board of Tax Appeals (later the United States Tax Court) from 1929 to 1936.

== Early life, education, and career ==
Born in Duplin County, North Carolina, to Dr. Virgil Newton Seawell and Ella Croom, Seawell attended Wake Forest College and received his law degree from the University of North Carolina School of Law. He gained admission to the bar in the state in 1892, and entered the private practice of law in Carthage, North Carolina.

Seawell was a Populist until 1892, when he became a Republican. Seawell's first foray into politics was in 1894, when he ran as a Republican candidate for solicitor in the Seventh Judicial District. Seawell was ruled by a three-to-two vote of the Board of State Canvassers to have lost the contest, in part because a large number of ballots were returned for "Herbert L. Seawell", and were discounted. A court voided the election outcome, but Seawell declined a temporary appointment to the position offered by Governor Elias Carr, preferring to seek a judgment of entitlement to hold the office for the full four-year term. Seawell ultimately prevailed, holding the office from 1894 to 1898. In 1906, Seawell was a member of the Board of Electors for Moore County, North Carolina.

== U.S. Attorney, gubernatorial candidate, and federal judicial service ==
In 1909, President William Howard Taft nominated Seawell for a position as a United States District Court judge, but the nomination was not confirmed by the United States Senate. Taft then nominated Seawell for the position of United States Attorney, and this nomination was confirmed. Seawell served in this office until 1914, and afterwards was a delegate to the 1916 Republican National Convention. In 1922, Judge Henry G. Connor indicated that he would endorse Seawell to succeed him on the federal bench, as Connor was then considering retiring to take a professorship, but the nomination again failed, and Connor instead remained on the bench until shortly before his death in 1924.

Seawell was the Republican nominee in the 1928 North Carolina gubernatorial election, losing to Democratic nominee O. Max Gardner, who won over 55% of the vote.

In July 1929, North Carolina Republican leaders put Seawell and Irvin B. Tucker forward to President Herbert Hoover as candidates for an open seat on the United States Court of Claims, but neither was selected for the seat. Hoover then nominated Seawell for a seat on the United States Board of Tax Appeals in Washington, D.C., to which Seawell was confirmed, serving from 1929 to 1936. Following this service, Seawell returned to private practice.

== Personal life ==
Seawell married Ella McNeill on July 30, 1895, with whom he had two sons and a daughter. Seawell's older son, Herbert F. "Chub" Seawell Jr., also became involved in state politics and was the Republican nominee in the 1952 North Carolina gubernatorial election, and was also unsuccessful in his bid for the office.

Seawell retired from the practice of law around 1946 due to illness, and died at his home in Carthage in 1949, at the age of 79.

Party political offices
Preceded by Charles A. Reynolds	Republican nominee for Lieutenant Governor of North Carolina; 1900	Succeeded by Isaac Melson Meekins
Preceded by John J. Parker	Republican nominee for Attorney General of North Carolina; 1920	Succeeded by Garrett D. Bailey
Preceded by Isaac Melson Meekins	Republican nominee for Governor of North Carolina; 1928	Succeeded by Clifford C. Frazier
