= 1928 North Carolina gubernatorial election =

- November 6, 1928
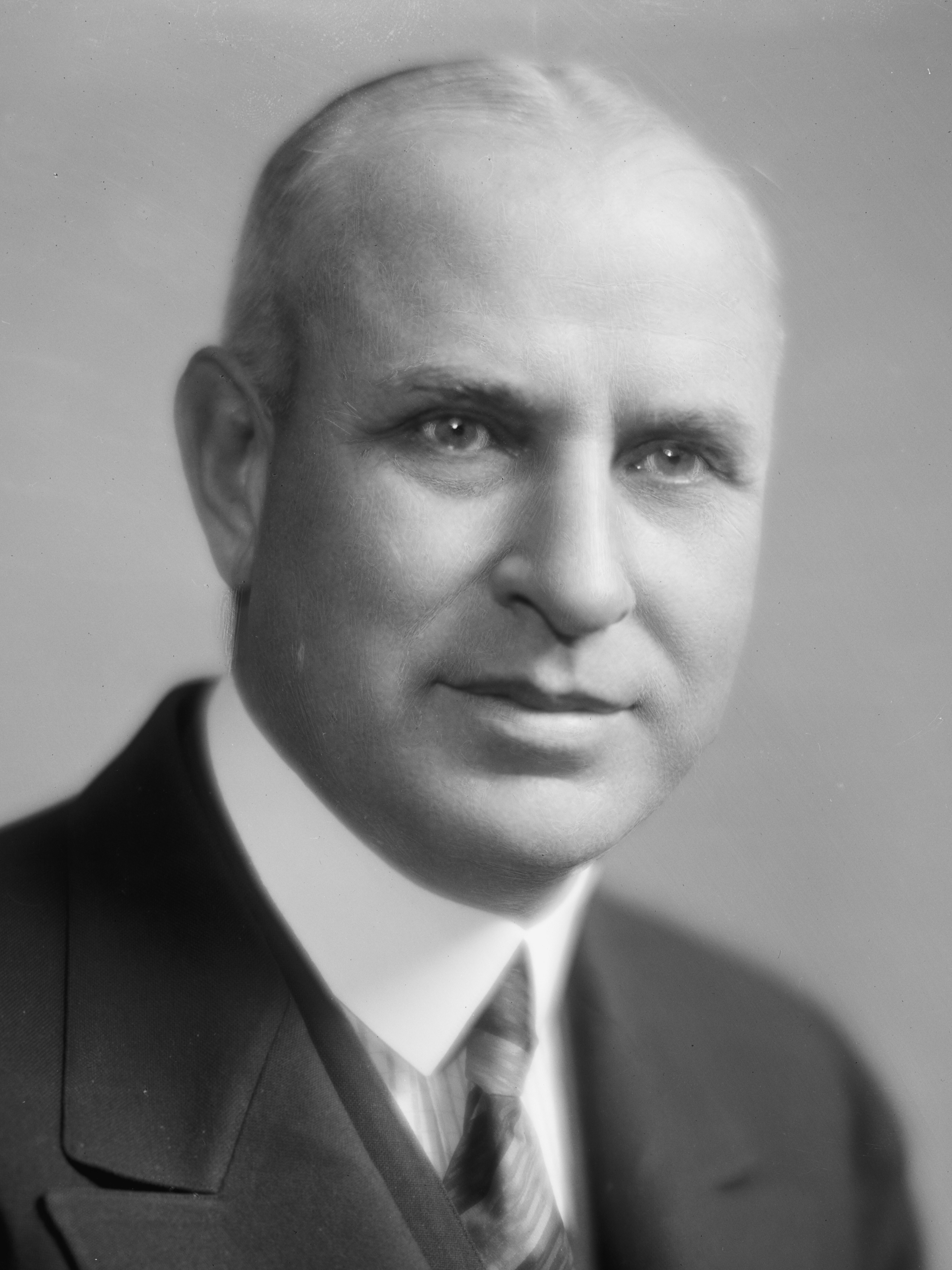

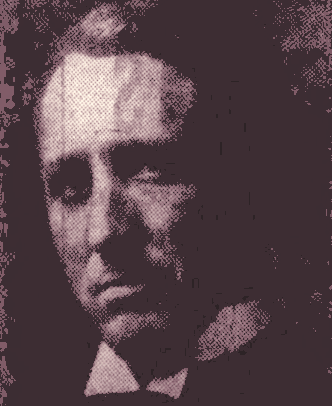
Nominee	Oliver Max Gardner	Herbert F. Seawell
Party	Democratic	Republican
Popular vote	362,009	289,415
Percentage	55.57%	44.43%
- County results Gardner: 50–60% 60–70% 70–80% 80–90% >90% Seawell: 50–60% 60–70% 70–80% 80–90%
Governor before election
Angus Wilton McLean
Democratic
Elected Governor
Oliver Max Gardner
Democratic

The 1928 North Carolina gubernatorial election was held on November 6, 1928. Democratic nominee Oliver Max Gardner defeated Republican nominee Herbert F. Seawell, with just over 55% of the vote. This was, relatively, a close election for the time in North Carolina, with Gardner receiving the smallest percentage of the vote that any Democratic gubernatorial nominee won between 1900 and 1956. The result came against the backdrop of divisions in the state Democratic Party over the controversial nomination of Alfred E. Smith for president. Gardner supported Smith, who lost the state to Herbert Hoover.

== Primary elections ==
=== Democratic primary ===
- Oliver Max Gardner, the former Lieutenant Governor, was unopposed for the Democratic nomination.

== General election ==
=== Candidates ===
- O. Max Gardner, Democratic
- Herbert F. Seawell, Republican, attorney and former United States Attorney for the Eastern District of North Carolina

=== Results ===
1928 North Carolina gubernatorial election
Party	Candidate	Votes	%	±%
Democratic	O. Max Gardner	362,009	55.57%	
Republican	Herbert F. Seawell	289,415	44.43%	
Majority		72,594		
Turnout		651,424		
Democratic hold		Swing		
