= Thomas Purnell =

Thomas Purnell may refer to:

- Thomas Richard Purnell (1847–1908), United States federal judge
- Thomas Purnell (critic) (1834–1889), British author and drama critic
