= Judge Butler =

Judge Butler may refer to:

- Algernon Lee Butler (1905–1978), judge of the United States District Court for the Eastern District of North Carolina
- Charles R. Butler Jr. (born 1940), judge of the United States District Court for the Southern District of Alabama
- William Butler (judge) (1822–1909), judge of the United States District Court for the Eastern District of Pennsylvania

== See also ==
- Pierce Butler (judge) (1866–1939), associate justice of the Supreme Court of the United States
