= Malcolm Howard =

Malcolm Howard may refer to:

- Malcolm Jones Howard (born 1939), United States federal judge
- Malcolm Howard (rower) (born 1983), Canadian rower
