= Judge Gilliam =

Judge Gilliam may refer to:

- Donnell Gilliam (1889–1960), judge of the United States District Court for the Eastern District of North Carolina
- Earl Ben Gilliam (1931–2001), judge of the United States District Court for the Southern District of California
- Haywood Gilliam (born 1969), judge of the United States District Court for the Northern District of California
- Robert B. Gilliam (1805–1870), judge of the North Carolina state superior court
