= William Earl Britt =

American judge (born 1932)

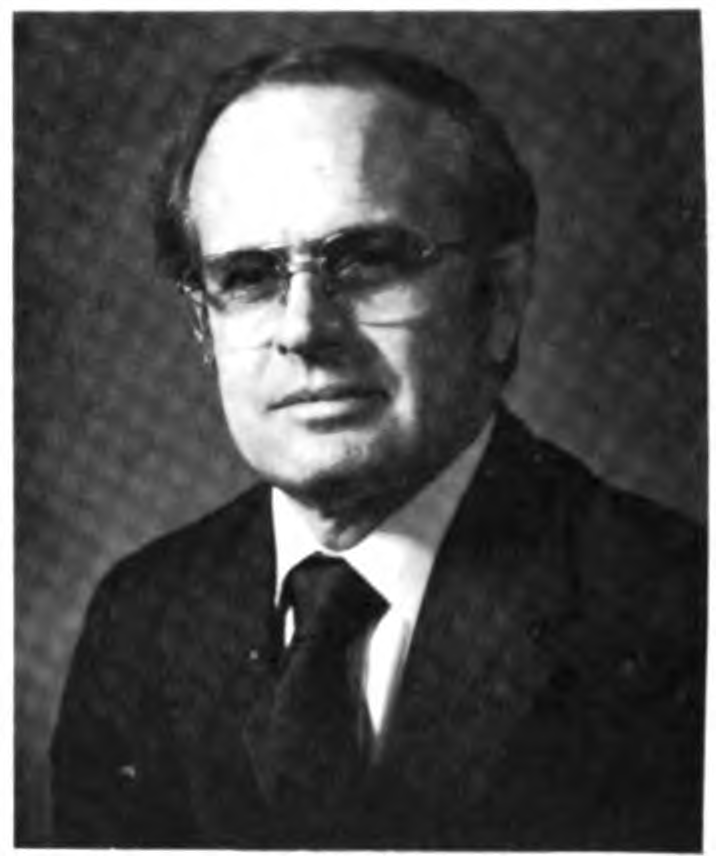

Senior Judge of the United States District Court for the Eastern District of North Carolina
- Incumbent
- Assumed office December 7, 1997

Chief Judge of the United States District Court for the Eastern District of North Carolina
- In office 1983–1990
- Preceded by: Franklin Taylor Dupree Jr.
- Succeeded by: James Carroll Fox

Judge of the United States District Court for the Eastern District of North Carolina
- In office May 23, 1980 – December 7, 1997
- Appointed by: Jimmy Carter
- Preceded by: John Davis Larkins Jr.
- Succeeded by: James C. Dever III

Personal details
- Born: December 7, 1932 (age 93) McDonald, North Carolina, U.S.
- Education: Wake Forest University (BS, LLB)

William Earl Britt (born December 7, 1932) is a senior United States district judge of the United States District Court for the Eastern District of North Carolina.

== Education and career ==
Britt was born in McDonald, North Carolina. He is the younger brother of David M. Britt. He received a Bachelor of Science degree from Wake Forest University in 1956 and a Bachelor of Laws from Wake Forest University School of Law in 1958. He was in the United States Army (SP-4) from 1953 to 1955. He was a law clerk for Justice Emery B. Denny of the North Carolina Supreme Court from 1958 to 1959. He was in private practice of law in Fairmont and Lumberton, North Carolina from 1959 to 1980.

=== Federal judicial service ===
Britt was nominated by President Jimmy Carter on April 14, 1980, to a seat on the United States District Court for the Eastern District of North Carolina vacated by Judge John Davis Larkins Jr. He was confirmed by the United States Senate on May 21, 1980, and received his commission on May 23, 1980. He served as chief judge from 1983 to 1990. Britt assumed senior status on December 7, 1997. As of 2020, Britt is the last judge for the Eastern District of North Carolina to be appointed by a Democratic president.

== See also ==
- List of United States federal judges by longevity of service

Legal offices
Preceded by John Davis Larkins Jr.	Judge of the United States District Court for the Eastern District of North Carolina; 1980–1997	Succeeded by James C. Dever III
Preceded by Franklin Taylor Dupree Jr.	Chief Judge of the United States District Court for the Eastern District of North Carolina; 1983–1990	Succeeded by James Carroll Fox
