= Terrence Boyle =

American judge (born 1945)

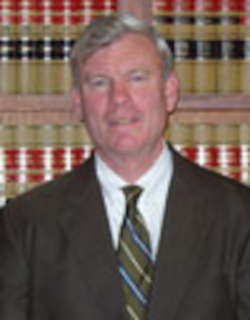

Chief Judge of the United States District Court for the Eastern District of North Carolina
- In office October 8, 2018 – January 1, 2021
- Preceded by: James C. Dever III
- Succeeded by: Richard E. Myers II
- In office 1997–2004
- Preceded by: James Carroll Fox
- Succeeded by: Louise W. Flanagan

Judge of the United States District Court for the Eastern District of North Carolina
- Incumbent
- Assumed office May 3, 1984
- Appointed by: Ronald Reagan
- Preceded by: Franklin Taylor Dupree Jr.

Personal details
- Born: Terrence William Boyle; December 22, 1945 (age 80) Passaic, New Jersey, U.S.
- Education: Brown University (BA); American University (JD)

Terrence William Boyle (born December 22, 1945) is a United States district judge of the United States District Court for the Eastern District of North Carolina. He was chief judge of that court from 1997 to 2004. He served a second term as chief judge from 2018 to 2021. From 1991 to 1993 and again from 2001 to 2007, he was a nominee to the United States Court of Appeals for the Fourth Circuit. His federal appellate nomination from 2001 to 2007 is the longest in history not to be acted upon by the United States Senate.

== Education and early career ==
Boyle was born in Passaic, New Jersey. He received a Bachelor of Arts degree from Brown University in 1967 and a Juris Doctor from the Washington College of Law at American University in 1970. From 1970 to 1973, he was the minority counsel of the Housing Subcommittee of the U.S. House of Representatives Committee on Banking and Currency. In 1973, he was a legislative assistant to Republican Senator Jesse Helms of North Carolina. He was in private practice in Elizabeth City, North Carolina from 1974 to 1984.

== Federal judicial service ==
Boyle was nominated by President Ronald Reagan on April 4, 1984, to a seat on the United States District Court for the Eastern District of North Carolina vacated by Judge Franklin Taylor Dupree Jr. He was confirmed by the United States Senate on April 24, 1984, and received commission on May 3, 1984. He served as chief judge from 1997 to 2004. He served as chief judge once again from 2018 to 2021. Following the assumption of senior status by Ricardo Hinojosa, Boyle is the longest-serving federal district court judge in active service.

On July 16, 2026, Boyle announced that he would be taking Senior Status.

=== First Fourth Circuit nomination ===
On October 22, 1991, Boyle was nominated by President George H. W. Bush to a newly created seat on the United States Court of Appeals for the Fourth Circuit, but his nomination was not acted upon by the Senate, which was controlled by the Democrats. His nomination was allowed to lapse at the end of Bush's presidency.

=== Subsequent Fourth Circuit nominations ===
On December 24, 1995, in the hope of integrating the Fourth Circuit, US President Bill Clinton nominated James A. Beaty Jr., an African-American judge of the United States District Court for the Middle District of North Carolina, to a Fourth Circuit seat vacated by Judge James Dickson Phillips Jr. in 1994, when he took senior status. Almost immediately, Beaty's nomination ran into opposition from Jesse Helms, who was angry that Clinton had refused to renominate Boyle to the Fourth Circuit. Beaty's nomination was ultimately unsuccessful because of Helms's opposition.

On May 9, 2001, Boyle was renominated by President George W. Bush to the Fourth Circuit, to the seat vacated by Judge Phillips, but his nomination was never brought to a vote on the floor of the Senate. For over five years, the nomination was stalled, ultimately becoming the longest federal appeals court nomination to never receive a full Senate vote.

His nomination was adamantly opposed by the Democratic Party from the beginning. Democratic Senator John Edwards claimed Boyle was an opponent of civil rights and rights of disabled people legislation, while Chuck Schumer said that his rulings had been reversed too often to deserve an appellate seat. Boyle's supporters viewed him as the victim of political payback and obstruction because of his ties to Helms, who had derailed several of Clinton's judicial nominations because he did not renominate Boyle.

In March 2005, after Bush's re-election and an increased Republican Senate majority, the Senate Judiciary Committee gave Boyle a hearing, almost a full four years after his nomination. On June 16, 2005, Boyle was voted out of Committee on a 10–8 party line vote.

In April 2006, Senate Majority Leader Bill Frist said he would try to schedule a vote in May on the nomination of Boyle. No vote occurred, however, and with the Democrats taking over the Senate in the 110th Congress, Boyle's confirmation chances markedly decreased. On January 9, 2007, the White House announced that it would not renominate Boyle. At the time, Boyle clearly stated he did not voluntarily withdraw his nomination.

On July 17, 2007, President Bush nominated United States District Court Judge Robert J. Conrad to the Phillips seat; Conrad's nomination was also unsuccessful. Phillips was ultimately succeeded by James Andrew Wynn, who was nominated by Barack Obama.

== See also ==
- George H.W. Bush judicial appointment controversies
- George W. Bush judicial appointment controversies
- List of United States federal judges by longevity of service

Legal offices
| Preceded by Franklin Taylor Dupree Jr. | Judge of the United States District Court for the Eastern District of North Carolina; 1984–present | Incumbent |
| Preceded by James Carroll Fox | Chief Judge of the United States District Court for the Eastern District of North Carolina; 1997–2004 | Succeeded by Louise W. Flanagan |
| Preceded by James C. Dever III | Chief Judge of the United States District Court for the Eastern District of North Carolina; 2018–2021 | Succeeded by Richard E. Myers II |
