= Warren H. Coolidge =

American lawyer

Warren Harding Coolidge was the United States Attorney for the Eastern District of North Carolina from 1969 until 1973, during the administration of President Richard Nixon. Previously, he had been a Republican candidate for North Carolina Attorney General in 1968.

As U.S. Attorney, Coolidge oversaw the prosecution of Ben Chavis and other members of the Wilmington Ten, and was involved in the early stages of the Jeffrey MacDonald murder investigation.

In 1985, Coolidge was found guilty of embezzling funds from clients and was disbarred.

Legal offices
Preceded by Robert H. Cowen	United States Attorney for the Eastern District of North Carolina; 1969–1973	Succeeded by Thomas P. McNamara
