= Charles A. Cooke =

American judge

Charles Alston Cooke

Member of the Oklahoma House of Representatives
- In office 1908–1910

Charles Alston Cooke, or Cook (c. 1848–1917) was an American politician and jurist in North Carolina and later in Oklahoma.

Cooke served as a member of the North Carolina House of Representatives and the North Carolina Senate, representing Warren County, as U.S. Attorney for the Eastern District of North Carolina (1889–1893) and later as an associate justice of the North Carolina Supreme Court (1901–1903).

Cooke moved to Muskogee, Oklahoma in 1903 and became a prominent lawyer and politician there as well. A Republican, he was elected to the Oklahoma House of Representatives in 1908 and was his party's unsuccessful nominee for the Oklahoma Supreme Court in 1912 and for Congress in 1914.

Party political offices
| Preceded by Augustus M. Moore | Republican nominee for Attorney General of North Carolina; 1884 | Succeeded by Thomas P. Devereux Jr. |
