= George Holding =

American politician (born 1968)

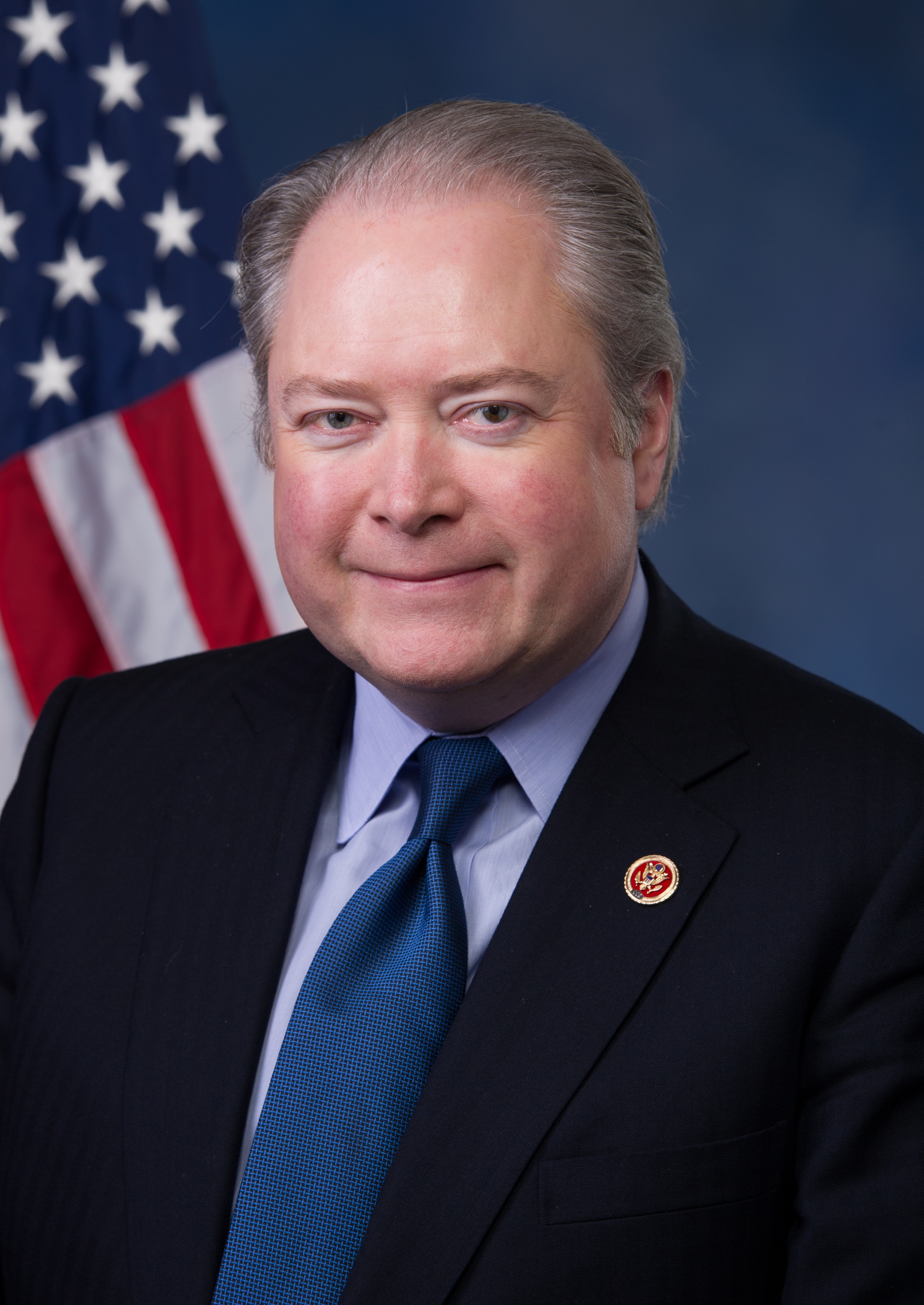

US Director of the European Bank for Reconstruction and Development
- Nominee
- Assumed office TBD
- President: Donald Trump
- Preceded by: Judy Shelton

Member of the U.S. House of Representatives from North Carolina
- In office January 3, 2013 – January 3, 2021
- Preceded by: Brad Miller
- Succeeded by: Deborah Ross
- Constituency: 13th district (2013–2017); 2nd district (2017–2021)

United States Attorney for the Eastern District of North Carolina
- In office September 13, 2006 – June 2011
- President: George W. Bush; Barack Obama
- Preceded by: Frank Whitney
- Succeeded by: Thomas Walker

Personal details
- Born: George Edward Bell Holding; April 17, 1968 (age 58) Raleigh, North Carolina, U.S.
- Party: Republican
- Spouse: Lucy Herriott (m. 1993)
- Children: 4
- Education: Wake Forest University (BA, JD)

George Edward Bell Holding (born April 17, 1968) is an American politician, lawyer, and former federal prosecutor who is a former United States representative for North Carolina's 2nd congressional district from 2017 to 2021. He previously represented the 13th District from 2013 to 2017. Holding is a member of the Republican Party. The district Holding represented stretched from just southwest of Raleigh to just east of Rocky Mount. He served as the United States Attorney for North Carolina's Eastern District from 2006 to 2011.

Holding announced in December 2019 that he would not run for re-election in 2020, after court-mandated redistricting made the district significantly more Democratic.

On September 9, 2025, Holding was nominated to be the US Director of the European Bank for Reconstruction and Development by President Donald Trump.

== Early life, education, and early law career ==
The youngest of five children, Holding grew up in Raleigh. He is a member of the Holding family which founded the First Citizens Bank in Smithfield. He attended the Groton School in Massachusetts. He attended Wake Forest University, studying Classics. After earning a Bachelor of Arts degree, he studied law at Wake Forest University School of Law. During law school, he met his future wife, Lucy Herriott. They married after graduating and returned to Raleigh where Holding practiced law with Kilpatrick Stockton.

In 1998, Holding left the practice of law to serve as legislative counsel to U.S. Senator Jesse Helms in Washington. He was employed by Maupin Taylor, a Raleigh law firm, from 2001 to 2002. Holding joined the U.S. Attorney's office for the Eastern District of North Carolina in 2002, working under Frank DeArmon Whitney. Under Whitney, the U.S. Attorney's office prosecuted a number of high-profile public corruption cases, including former state Agriculture Commissioner Meg Scott Phipps, former state House Speaker Jim Black and former U.S. Representative Frank Ballance. Whitney left his position as U.S. Attorney when he became a judge for the United States District Court for the Western District of North Carolina.

== U.S. Attorney's office ==
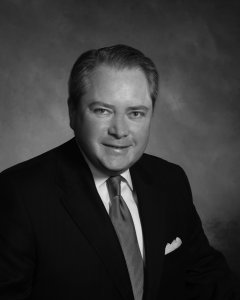
Holding during his tenure as U.S. attorney

On September 9, 2006, Holding was nominated by President George W. Bush to succeed Frank Whitney as U.S. Attorney for the Eastern District of North Carolina. On September 13, 2006, the U.S. Senate confirmed Holding's nomination by voice vote. Holding remained as U.S. Attorney for two and a half years into the Obama administration in order to complete a number of political corruption cases.

During Holding's tenure as U.S. Attorney, former North Carolina Governor Mike Easley pleaded guilty to a campaign finance felony that followed a lengthy federal investigation. Holding oversaw the prosecution of former U.S. Senator John Edwards on campaign-finance charges; in 2012, Edwards was acquitted on one count, and the jury deadlocked on five other counts. The Justice Department decided not to retry Edwards on the counts that the jury deadlocked on.

During his tenure, Holding also oversaw the prosecution of Daniel Patrick Boyd and the Raleigh jihad group on charges including conspiracy to provide material support to terrorists.

== U.S. House of Representatives ==
=== Elections ===
==== 2012 ====
After his resignation as U.S. Attorney in 2011, Holding announced his candidacy for Congress in North Carolina's 13th congressional district. The district had been significantly redrawn to be more compact and Republican than its predecessor. The old 13th ran along a portion of the Virginia border, but extended two tendrils into Greensboro and Raleigh. The new 13th covered eastern Raleigh, as well as suburban and exurban areas to the east. Holding was endorsed by multiple conservative business and civic leaders, including N.C. Supreme Court Chief Justice I. Beverly Lake and former U.S. Senator Lauch Faircloth.

Holding won the Republican primary in May. He defeated former Raleigh Mayor Paul Coble. In the general election, he won the seat with 57% of the vote.

==== 2014 ====
Holding was unopposed in the Republican primary for re-election. He won the general election against his Democratic challenger, Brenda Cleary, a registered nurse and former executive director of the North Carolina Center for Nursing, 57%-43%.

==== 2016 ====
Following court-ordered redistricting in 2016, a large portion of the 13th was merged into the neighboring 2nd district. Holding's home was located in the 4th district under the new map, just outside the new 2nd's borders. However, congressional candidates are only required to live in the state they wish to represent. Holding decided to run in the 2nd district against the incumbent, fellow Republican Renee Ellmers, in the primary. The newly drawn district encompassed outer portions of Raleigh, many of its northern and southern suburbs, along with parts of rural Harnett, Johnston, Wilson, Nash, and Franklin counties.

During the primary campaign, Holding was endorsed by the American Conservative Union and the anti-abortion N.C. Values Coalition, and the Club for Growth and the Koch brothers' Americans for Prosperity ran ads against Ellmers. Ellmers made much of the fact that Holding lived outside the 2nd district (six miles from the district's border), although the new district was actually geographically and demographically more similar to Holding's old 13th district than to Ellmers' old 2nd district. In the June 2016 primary, Holding defeated Ellmers, 53.4% to 23.6%, with a third candidate, Greg Brannon, receiving 23.0% of the vote.

In the November 2016 general election, Holding defeated Democratic nominee John McNeil, receiving 56.7% to McNeil's 43.3%.

==== 2018 ====
In 2018, the Cook Political Report rated the congressional race in the 2nd district as "lean Republican." Holding won reelection with 51.3% of the vote, defeating Democratic nominee Linda Coleman, a former state representative who received 45.8% of the vote. Libertarian Party candidate Jeff Matemu received 2.9% of the vote. Coleman received more votes than Holding in the Wake County portion of the district (the district's most populous) but Holding led in the other five counties in the district. Outside groups spent at least $3.3 million on the competitive race.

==== 2020 ====
After a North Carolina state judge issued a preliminary injunction forbidding the use of the 2016 congressional map for the 2020 elections, the state legislature drew a new map. Holding's district was made significantly more Democratic than its predecessor. The old 2nd had covered most of northern and southern Wake County, as well as exurban areas south and east of the capital. The new 2nd was a compact district in southern Wake County, including almost all of Raleigh. Had it existed in 2016, Hillary Clinton would have carried it with 60 percent of the vote; by comparison, Donald Trump had carried the old 2nd with 53 percent of the vote. On paper, the new map turned the 2nd from a Republican-leaning district into one of the most Democratic white-majority districts in the South.

Even before the new map was issued, state and national Democrats viewed the 2nd as a potential pickup opportunity for Democrats due to the close 2018 contest. Three Democrats sought the congressional nomination. Soon after the new map was issued, former state representative and unsuccessful 2016 Senate candidate Deborah Ross entered the race for the redrawn 2nd. In December 2019, Holding announced he would retire at the end of his term, saying the new map was a factor in his decision. However, according to J. Miles Coleman of the University of Virginia Center for Politics, Holding's fundraising had left much to be desired even before the new map was issued–a "tell-tale sign of retirement."

=== Tenure ===
During Donald Trump's presidency, Holding voted in line with the president's stated position 90.5% of the time.

Holding opposes abortion, and during his 2016 Republican primary battle against Representative Renee Ellmers, Holding received the support of two major anti-abortion groups, the Susan B. Anthony List and the National Right to Life Committee. In 2017, Holding voted for legislation to ban abortion after the 20th week of pregnancy.

Holding opposes the Affordable Care Act (ACA or Obamacare) and supported the 2017 House Republican bill to repeal and replace the ACA. During his 2018 re-election campaign, Holding incorrectly claimed that "we’re all paying 100 percent more" on health insurance premiums due to the ACA; in fact, only 2 to 5 percent of Americans were affected by premium increases related to the ACA's individual market, which is the smallest health insurance market.

On December 18, 2019, Holding voted against both articles of impeachment against Trump. Of the 195 Republicans who voted, all voted against both impeachment articles.

=== Committee assignments ===
Holding's committee assignments were as follows:

- 113th Congress (2013–15): Foreign Affairs; Judiciary
- 114th Congress (2015–17): Ways and Means
- 115th Congress (2017–19): Ways and Means
- 116th Congress (2019–21): Ways and Means, Budget, Ethics

=== Caucus memberships ===
Holding was a member of the Republican Study Committee, Congressional Western Caucus, International Conservation Caucus, and U.S.-Japan Caucus. Holding was the House Republican chair of the British-American Parliamentary Group, which maintained ties between the U.S. Congress and the British Parliament, and was co-chair of the Congressional U.K. Caucus; in theses roles, Holding had led congressional delegations to Britain and commented on Brexit.

== Post-congressional career ==
=== Private sector ===
In 2021, Holding was hired to work as a managing director of government relations for Blackstone Inc. In March 2025, he was appointed to the board of directors of Trump Media and Technology Group Corp. In July 2026 he resigned that position.

=== U.S. Director of the European Bank for Reconstruction and Development ===
Holding was nominated to be the U.S. Director of the European Bank for Reconstruction and Development by President Donald Trump on September 9, 2025.

== Awards ==
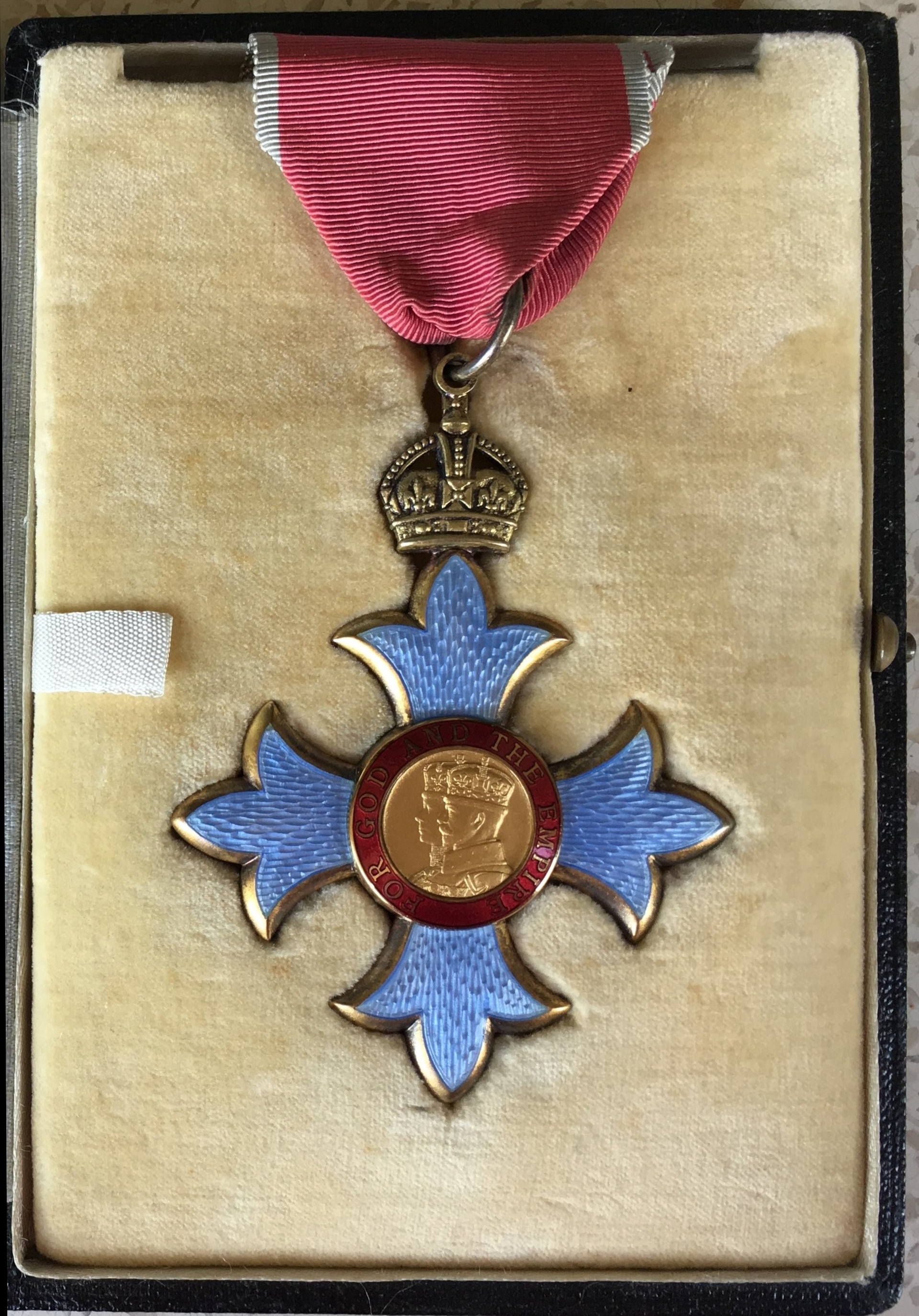
Most Excellent Order of the British Empire

In July 2022, he was awarded as Honorary Officer of the Order of the British Empire (OBE), for services to UK -US Relations.

== Personal life ==
George is married to Lucy Holding, who was born in England. They have four children. Holding is a Baptist.

Legal offices
Preceded by Frank Whitney	United States Attorney for the Eastern District of North Carolina; 2006–2011	Succeeded by Thomas Walker
U.S. House of Representatives
Preceded by Brad Miller	Member of the U.S. House of Representatives from North Carolina's 13th congressional district 2013–2017	Succeeded by Ted Budd
Preceded by Renee Ellmers	Member of the U.S. House of Representatives from North Carolina's 2nd congressional district 2017–2021	Succeeded by Deborah Ross
U.S. order of precedence (ceremonial)
Preceded by Martin Lancaster as Former U.S. Representative	Order of precedence of the United States as Former U.S. Representative	Succeeded by Carl C. Perkins as Former U.S. Representative
