= Isaac Melson Meekins =

American judge

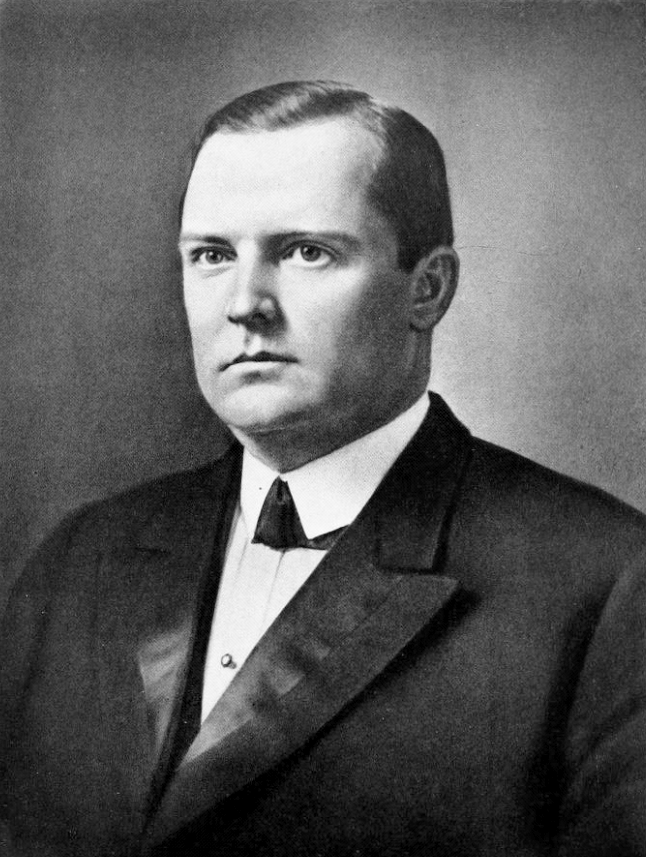

Senior Judge of the United States District Court for the Eastern District of North Carolina
- In office February 13, 1945 – November 21, 1946

Judge of the United States District Court for the Eastern District of North Carolina
- In office January 17, 1925 – February 13, 1945
- Appointed by: Calvin Coolidge
- Preceded by: Henry G. Connor
- Succeeded by: Donnell Gilliam

Personal details
- Born: February 13, 1875 Tyrrell County, North Carolina
- Died: November 21, 1946 (aged 71) Elizabeth City, North Carolina
- Education: Wake Forest University (A.B.)
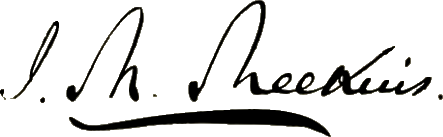
- Signature

Isaac Melson Meekins (February 13, 1875 – November 21, 1946) was a United States district judge of the United States District Court for the Eastern District of North Carolina.

== Education and career ==
Born in Tyrrell County, North Carolina, Meekins received an Artium Baccalaureus degree from Wake Forest University in 1896 and entered private practice in Elizabeth City, North Carolina. He was Mayor of Elizabeth City in 1897, and city attorney of Elizabeth City in 1898. He was postmaster of Elizabeth City from 1903 to 1908. He was an Assistant United States Attorney of the Eastern District of North Carolina from 1910 to 1914. He was general counsel for the Alien Property Custodian in Washington, D.C. from 1921 to 1922. He was general counsel and manager for the Enemy Insurance Company in 1922.

In 1924, Meekins was the unsuccessful Republican nominee for Governor of North Carolina.

== Federal judicial service ==
On January 9, 1925, Meekins was nominated by President Calvin Coolidge to a seat on the United States District Court for the Eastern District of North Carolina vacated by Judge Henry G. Connor. Meekins was confirmed by the United States Senate on January 17, 1925, and received his commission the same day. He assumed senior status on February 13, 1945, serving in that capacity until his death in Elizabeth City on November 21, 1946.

== Sources ==
Party political offices
Preceded by Herbert F. Seawell	Republican nominee for Lieutenant Governor of North Carolina; 1904	Succeeded by Charles F. Toms
Preceded by John J. Parker	Republican nominee for Governor of North Carolina; 1924	Succeeded by Herbert F. Seawell
Legal offices
Preceded by Henry G. Connor	Judge of the United States District Court for the Eastern District of North Carolina; 1925–1945	Succeeded by Donnell Gilliam
