= Robert Higdon Jr. =

American attorney

Robert J. Higdon Jr.
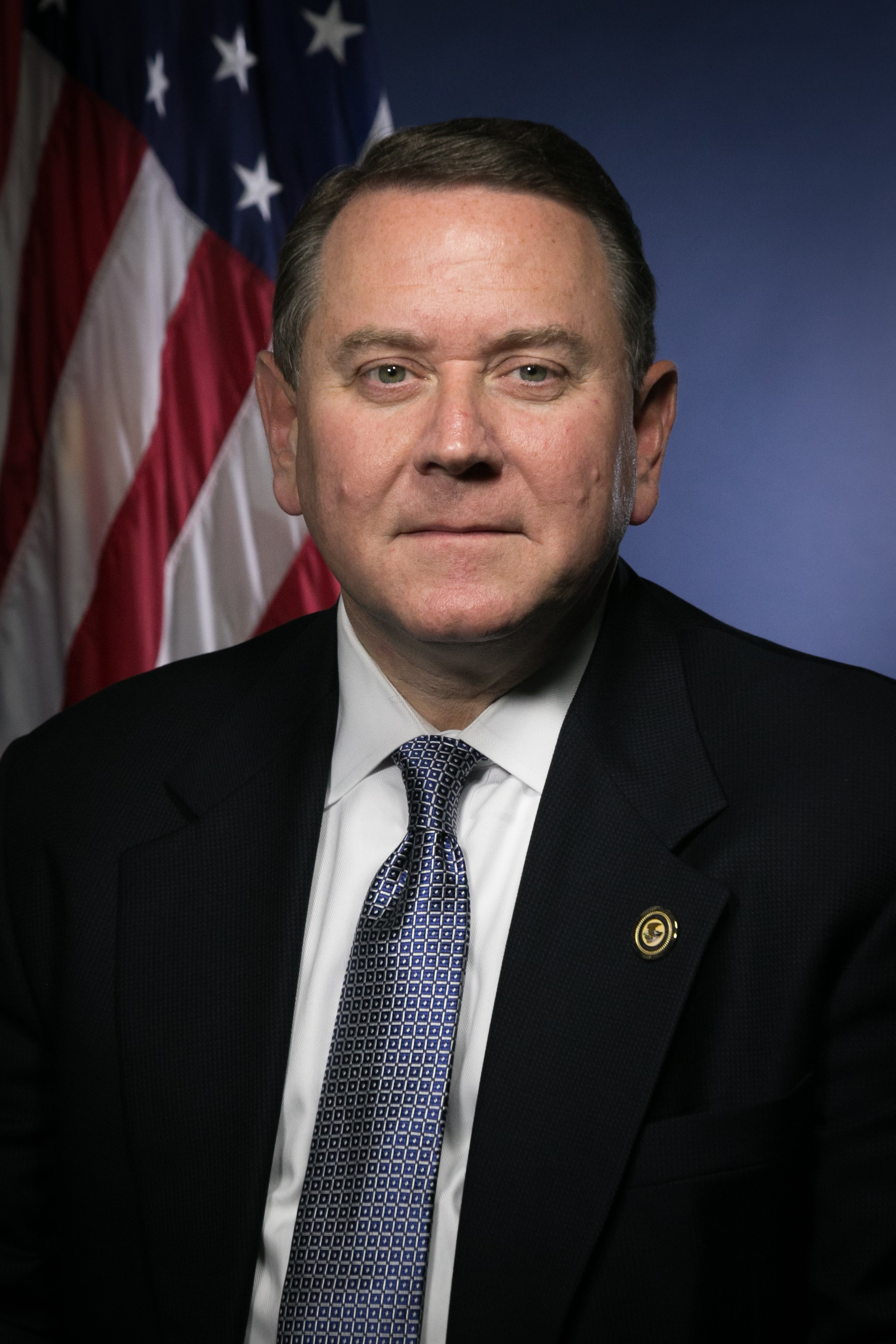

United States Attorney for the Eastern District of North Carolina
- In office October 10, 2017 – February 28, 2021
- President: Donald Trump; Joe Biden
- Preceded by: Thomas Walker
- Succeeded by: Michael F. Easley Jr.

Personal details
- Education: Wake Forest University (BA, JD)

Robert J. Higdon Jr. is an American attorney who served as the United States Attorney for the United States District Court for the Eastern District of North Carolina from 2017 to 2021.

Prior to assuming his current role, he was a partner at the law firm of Williams Mullen. Higdon was previously an Assistant United States Attorney in both the Western and Eastern Districts of North Carolina. In the Eastern District U.S. Attorney's Office, he served as Chief of the Criminal Division for more than 11 years, supervising and prosecuting criminal cases involving drug trafficking, terrorism, violent crime, white collar crime, and public corruption. Higdon also served as senior trial counsel in the Public Integrity Section of the United States Department of Justice. In 2012, he led the federal prosecution in a campaign finance fraud case involving Democrat John Edwards. On February 8, 2021, he along with 55 other Trump-era attorneys were asked to resign. Higdon announced his resignation on February 11, effective February 28, 2021.

Legal offices
Preceded by Thomas Walker	United States Attorney for the Eastern District of North Carolina; 2017–2021	Succeeded by Norman Acker; Acting
