= Augustus Sherrill Seymour =

American judge

Judge of the United States District Court for the Eastern District of North Carolina
- In office February 21, 1882 – February 19, 1897
- Appointed by: Chester A. Arthur
- Preceded by: George Washington Brooks
- Succeeded by: Thomas Richard Purnell

Member of the North Carolina House of Representatives
- In office 1868-1870

Personal details
- Born: Augustus Sherrill Seymour; November 30, 1836 Ithaca, New York
- Died: February 19, 1897 (aged 60) New York City, New York
- Education: Hamilton College read law

Augustus Sherrill Seymour (November 30, 1836 – February 19, 1897) was a lawyer, state legislator, and United States district judge of the United States District Court for the Eastern District of North Carolina.

== Education and career ==
Born in Ithaca, New York, Seymour graduated from Hamilton College in 1857 and read law to enter the bar in 1858. He was in private practice in New York City, New York from 1858 to 1862, and then in New Bern, North Carolina beginning in 1865. He became the city attorney of New Bern in 1867. He was a Judge in Craven County, North Carolina in 1868, and was a member of the North Carolina House of Representatives from 1868 to 1870, thereafter resuming private practice in New Bern. He was a member of the North Carolina Senate from 1872 to 1874, and a Judge of the Superior Court in New Bern from 1874 to 1882.

== Federal judicial service ==
On February 14, 1882, Seymour was nominated by President Chester A. Arthur to a seat on the United States District Court for the Eastern District of North Carolina vacated by Judge George Washington Brooks. Seymour was confirmed by the United States Senate on February 21, 1882, and received his commission the same day. He served in that capacity until his death on February 19, 1897, in New York City.

== See also ==
- North Carolina General Assembly of 1868–1869

== Sources ==
Legal offices
Preceded by George Washington Brooks	Judge of the United States District Court for the Eastern District of North Carolina; 1882–1897	Succeeded by Thomas Richard Purnell
