= Asa Biggs =

American judge (1811–1878)

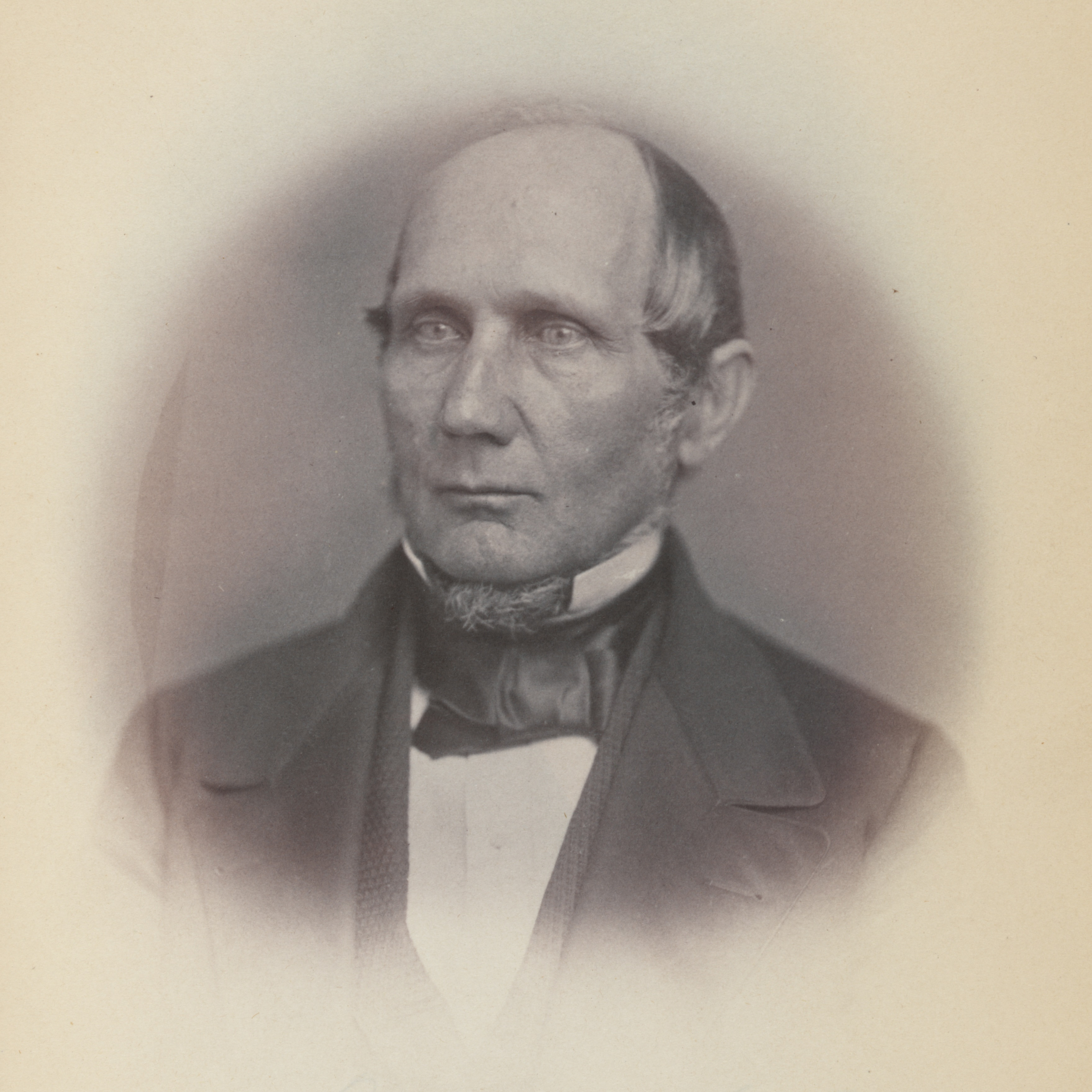
- Biggs in ca. 1859

Judge of the United States District Court for the District of North Carolina
- In office May 3, 1858 – April 23, 1861
- Appointed by: James Buchanan
- Preceded by: Henry Potter
- Succeeded by: George Washington Brooks

United States Senator from North Carolina
- In office March 4, 1855 – May 5, 1858
- Preceded by: George Edmund Badger
- Succeeded by: Thomas Lanier Clingman

Member of the U.S. House of Representatives from North Carolina's 9th district
- In office March 4, 1845 – March 3, 1847
- Preceded by: Kenneth Rayner
- Succeeded by: David Outlaw

Personal details
- Born: Asa Biggs; February 4, 1811 Williamston, North Carolina, U.S.
- Died: March 6, 1878 (aged 67) Norfolk, Virginia, U.S.
- Resting place: Elmwood Cemetery
- Party: Democratic

Asa Biggs (February 4, 1811 – March 6, 1878) was an American attorney, politician, and jurist who served as a member of both chambers of the United States Congress and as a United States district judge of the United States District Court for the Albemarle, Cape Fear and Pamptico Districts of North Carolina.

== Education and career ==
Born on February 4, 1811, in Williamston, Martin County, North Carolina, Biggs attended the common schools and pursued classical studies, then read law in 1831. He was admitted to the bar and entered private practice in Williamston from 1831 to 1845, and from 1847 to 1854. In 1832, he married Martha Elizabeth Andrews; they had 10 children, 2 of which died in infancy. Biggs owned "several slaves" as a result of his marriage.

He was a delegate to the North Carolina constitutional convention in 1835. He was a member of the North Carolina House of Commons (now the North Carolina House of Representatives) from 1840 to 1842. He was a member of the North Carolina Senate from 1844 to 1845.

== Congressional service ==
Biggs was elected as a Democrat from North Carolina's 9th congressional district to the United States House of Representatives of the 29th United States Congress, serving from March 4, 1845, to March 3, 1847. He was an unsuccessful candidate for reelection in 1846. He was a member of a commission to codify North Carolina laws in 1851 along with Bartholomew F. Moore and Romulous M. Saunders. He was elected as a Democrat to the United States Senate and served from March 4, 1855, until May 5, 1858, when he resigned to accept a federal judicial post.

== Federal judicial service ==
Biggs was nominated by President James Buchanan on May 3, 1858, to a seat on the United States District Court for the Albemarle, Cape Fear and Pamptico Districts of North Carolina (also referenced officially as the United States District Court for the District of North Carolina) vacated by Judge Henry Potter. He was confirmed by the United States Senate on May 3, 1858, and received his commission the same day. His service terminated on April 23, 1861, due to his resignation.

== Later career and death ==
Biggs was a member of the secession convention of North Carolina in 1861. Following his resignation from the federal bench, Biggs served as a Judge of the Confederate District Court for the District of North Carolina from 1861 to 1865. He resumed private practice in Tarboro, Edgecombe County, North Carolina, from 1865 to 1868. He continued private practice and was a businessman in Norfolk, Virginia, from 1868 to 1878. He died on March 6, 1878, in Norfolk. He was interred in Elmwood Cemetery in Norfolk.

== Autobiography ==
During the American Civil War, Biggs took refuge at Dalkeith near the unincorporated community of Arcola, Warren County, North Carolina, where he wrote his autobiography.

== Asa Biggs House ==
Historical marker, Williamston, North Carolina

The Asa Biggs House and Site at Williamston was added to the National Register of Historic Places in 1979.

== Sources ==
- Dictionary of American Biography; Biggs, Asa. Autobiography of Asa Biggs, Including a Journal of a Trip from North Carolina to New York in 1832. Edited by Robert D. W. Connor. North Carolina Historical Commission Publications. Bulletin No. 19. Raleigh: * Edwards and Broughton Printing Company, 1915.
- United States Congress. "Asa Biggs (id: B000456)". Biographical Directory of the United States Congress.
- Autobiography of Asa Biggs, Including a Journal of a Trip from North Carolina to New York in 1832. Raleigh, [N.C.]: Edwards & Broughton, 1915.

U.S. House of Representatives
Preceded by Kenneth Rayner	United States Representative from North Carolina's 9th congressional district 1845–1847	Succeeded by David Outlaw
U.S. Senate
Preceded by George Edmund Badger	U.S. senator (Class 3) from North Carolina; 1855–1858; Served alongside: David Settle Reid	Succeeded by Thomas Lanier Clingman
Legal offices
Preceded by Henry Potter	Judge of the United States District Court for the District of North Carolina; 1858–1861	Succeeded by George Washington Brooks
