= James C. Dever III =

American judge (born 1962)

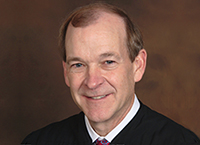
- Official Portrait of Judge James C. Dever III

Chief Judge of the United States District Court for the Eastern District of North Carolina
- In office October 8, 2011 – October 8, 2018
- Preceded by: Louise W. Flanagan
- Succeeded by: Terrence Boyle

Judge of the United States District Court for the Eastern District of North Carolina
- Incumbent
- Assumed office May 2, 2005
- Appointed by: George W. Bush
- Preceded by: William Earl Britt

Magistrate Judge of the United States District Court for the Eastern District of North Carolina
- In office 2004–2005

Personal details
- Born: James Columcille Dever III; May 25, 1962 (age 64) Lake Charles, Louisiana, U.S.
- Education: University of Notre Dame (BBA); Duke University (JD)

James Columcille Dever III (born May 25, 1962) is an American attorney and jurist serving as a United States district judge of the United States District Court for the Eastern District of North Carolina.

== Early life and education ==
Born in Lake Charles, Louisiana, Dever received a Bachelor of Business Administration with high honors from the University of Notre Dame in 1984 and a Juris Doctor with high honors from Duke University School of Law in 1987. At Duke, he served as editor-in-chief of the Duke Law Journal, was elected to the Order of the Coif, and received numerous academic awards.

== Career ==
Dever was a law clerk to Judge J. Clifford Wallace of the United States Court of Appeals for the Ninth Circuit from 1987 to 1988. He served in the United States Air Force as a member of the General Counsel Honors Program from 1988 to 1992. He continued to serve in the United States Air Force Reserves 1992 to 2000. He was in private practice in North Carolina from 1992 to 2004. Dever has also served as an adjunct professor at the Norman Adrian Wiggins School of Law, Campbell University since 1997. He is currently a Senior Lecturing Fellow at Duke University School of Law, a position he has held since 2008. In 2014, Chief Justice John Roberts appointed Judge Dever to serve on the Advisory Committee on Criminal Rules, where he served until 2021. In 2022, Chief Justice Roberts appointed Dever as Chair of the Advisory Committee on Criminal Rules, where he served until September 2025. In October 2025, Chief Justice Roberts appointed Judge Dever to serve as Chair of the Committee on Rules of Practice and Procedure (i.e., the Standing Committee). The Standing Committee oversees supervision of the federal judiciary's rulemaking process and oversees and coordinates the work of the Advisory Committees on the Federal Rules of Evidence and of Appellate, Bankruptcy, Civil, and Criminal Procedure.

=== Federal judicial service ===
On May 22, 2002, and January 7, 2003, President George W. Bush nominated Dever to serve on the United States District Court for the Eastern District of North Carolina, but he never received a Senate vote. Dever served as a United States magistrate judge for the Eastern District of North Carolina from 2004 to 2005. On February 14, 2005, Dever was nominated by President George W. Bush to a seat on the United States District Court for the Eastern District of North Carolina vacated by William Earl Britt. Dever was confirmed by the United States Senate on April 28, 2005, and received his commission on May 2, 2005.

In 2006, Dever accepted the guilty plea of Michael P. Decker, a member of the state senate who had accepted a bribe to switch parties. In 2007, Dever sentenced North Carolina lottery commissioner Kevin Geddings to four years in prison for concealing his relationship with a lottery vendor.

In 2020, Dever heard arguments from a group of pastors who challenged Governor Roy Cooper on his authority to restrict religious activities during the COVID-19 pandemic. On May 16, 2020, Dever issued a 14-day temporary restraining order allowing indoor religious services. He said, "There is no pandemic exception to the Constitution of the United States or the Free Exercise Clause of the First Amendment."

Dever served as Chief Judge from October 8, 2011, to October 8, 2018.

Legal offices
Preceded by William Earl Britt	Judge of the United States District Court for the Eastern District of North Carolina; 2005–present	Incumbent
Preceded by Louise W. Flanagan	Chief Judge of the United States District Court for the Eastern District of North Carolina; 2011–2018	Succeeded by Terrence Boyle
