= John Davis Larkins Jr. =

American judge (1909–1990)

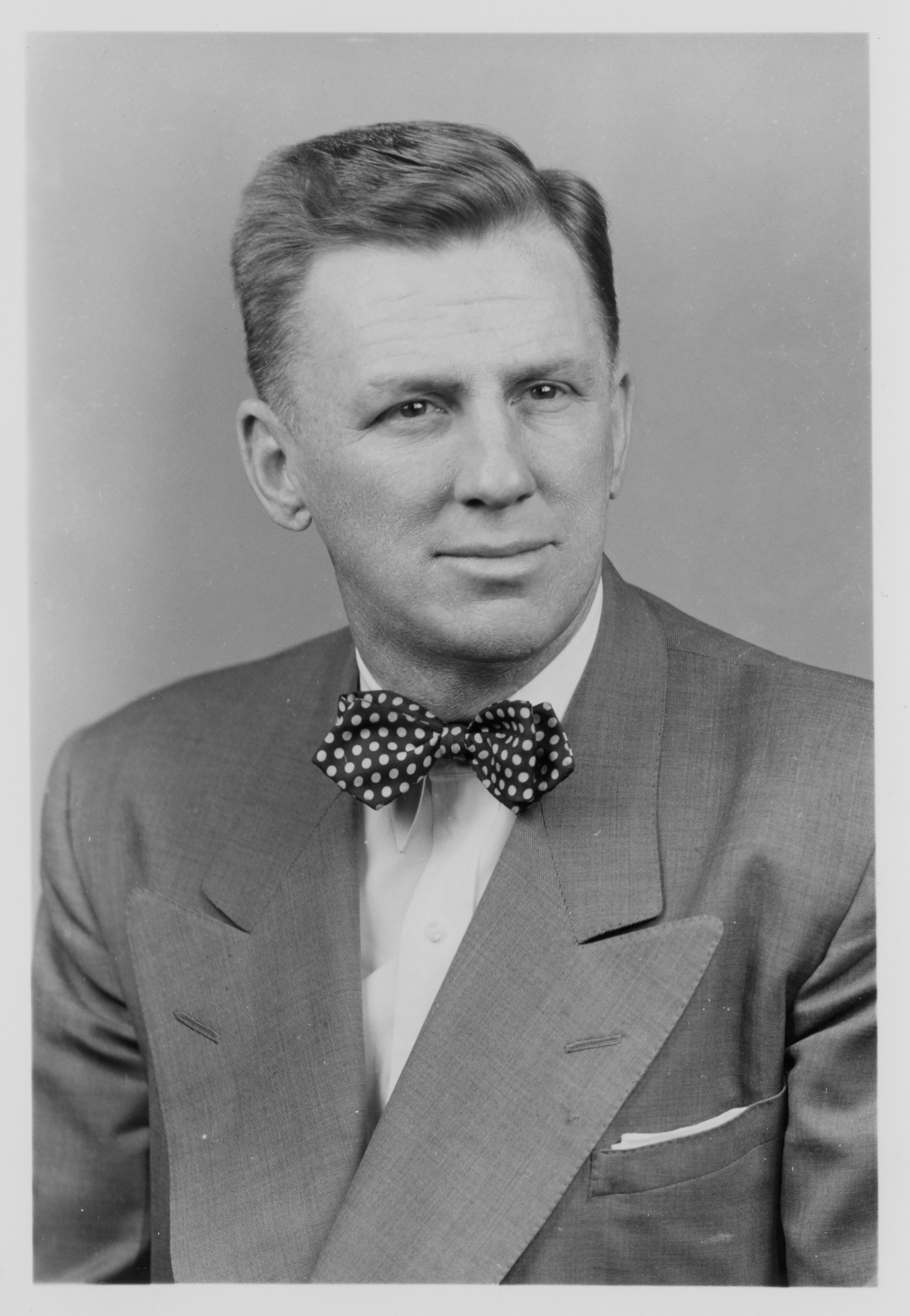
- Larkins c. 1951

Senior Judge of the United States District Court for the Eastern District of North Carolina
- In office June 8, 1979 – February 16, 1990

Chief Judge of the United States District Court for the Eastern District of North Carolina
- In office 1975–1979
- Preceded by: Algernon Lee Butler
- Succeeded by: Franklin Taylor Dupree Jr.

Judge of the United States District Court for the Eastern District of North Carolina
- In office August 21, 1961 – June 8, 1979
- Appointed by: John F. Kennedy
- Preceded by: Seat established by 75 Stat. 80
- Succeeded by: William Earl Britt

Personal details
- Born: John Davis Larkins Jr. June 8, 1909 Morristown, Tennessee
- Died: February 16, 1990 (aged 80) Kinston, North Carolina
- Education: Wake Forest University (B.A.) read law

John Davis Larkins Jr. (June 8, 1909 – February 16, 1990) was an American politician and jurist who served as a United States district judge of the United States District Court for the Eastern District of North Carolina.

== Education and career ==
Born in Morristown, Tennessee, Larkins received a Bachelor of Arts degree from Wake Forest University in 1929. He attended Wake Forest University School of Law but read law to enter the bar in 1930. He was in private practice of law in Trenton, North Carolina from 1930 to 1961. He was a Conciliation Commissioner in Bankruptcy for the United States District Court for the Eastern District of North Carolina in 1930. He was a Member of the North Carolina Senate from 1936 to 1954. He was President pro tempore from 1941 to 1943. He was a private in the United States Army in 1945. He was Liaison Officer and Legislative Counsel to the Governor of North Carolina Luther Hodges in 1955.

Larkins served as chair of the North Carolina Democratic Party in the 1950s and unsuccessfully sought the Democratic nomination for Governor in 1960.

== Federal judicial service ==
Larkins was nominated by President John F. Kennedy on August 8, 1961, to the United States District Court for the Eastern District of North Carolina, to a new seat created by 75 Stat. 80. He was confirmed by the United States Senate on August 21, 1961, and received his commission the same day. He served as Chief Judge from 1975 to 1979. He assumed senior status on June 8, 1979. His service ended with his death on February 16, 1990, in Kinston, North Carolina.

== Sources ==
- The Political Graveyard
- Guide to the John Davis Larkins Jr. Papers

Legal offices
Preceded by Seat established by 75 Stat. 80	Judge of the United States District Court for the Eastern District of North Carolina; 1961–1979	Succeeded by William Earl Britt
Preceded by Algernon Lee Butler	Chief Judge of the United States District Court for the Eastern District of North Carolina; 1975–1979	Succeeded by Franklin Taylor Dupree Jr.
