= 1924 North Carolina gubernatorial election =

- November 4, 1924
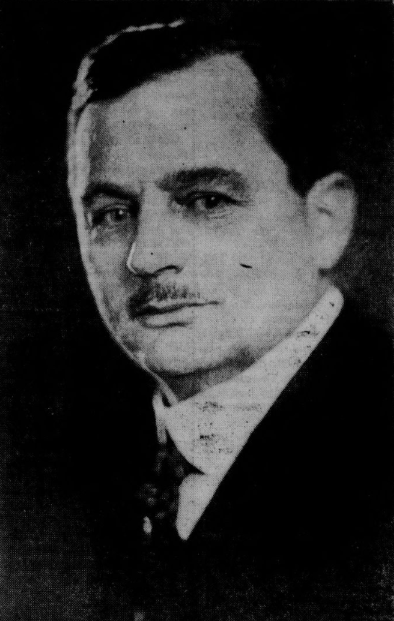

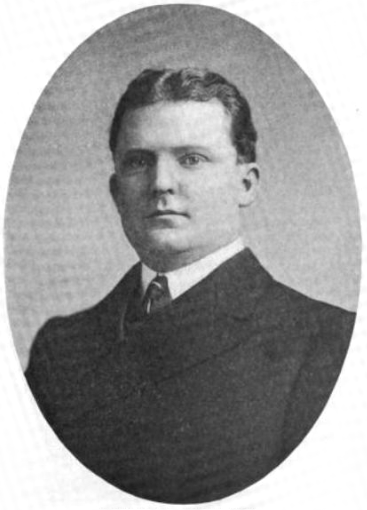
Nominee	Angus Wilton McLean	Isaac Melson Meekins
Party	Democratic	Republican
Popular vote	294,441	185,627
Percentage	61.33%	38.67%
- County results McLean: 50–60% 60–70% 70–80% 80–90% >90% Meekins: 50–60% 60–70% 80–90%
Governor before election
Cameron A. Morrison
Democratic
Elected Governor
Angus Wilton McLean
Democratic

The 1924 North Carolina gubernatorial election was held on November 4, 1924. Democratic nominee Angus Wilton McLean defeated Republican nominee Isaac Melson Meekins with 61.33% of the vote.

== Primary elections ==
Primary elections were held on June 7, 1924.

=== Democratic primary ===
==== Candidates ====
- Angus Wilton McLean, former member of the War Finance Corporation board
- Josiah Bailey, former United States Collector of Internal Revenue for North Carolina

==== Results ====
Wilton McLean: Wilton McLean—50–60%; Morrison—60–70%; Wilton McLean—70–80%; Wilton McLean—80–90%; Bailey: Bailey—50–60%; Bailey—60–70%; Bailey—70–80%; Bailey—80–90%

Democratic primary results
Party	Candidate	Votes	%
Democratic	Angus Wilton McLean	151,197	64.40
Democratic	Josiah Bailey	83,573	35.60
Total votes		234,770	100.00

== General election ==
=== Candidates ===
- Angus Wilton McLean, Democratic
- Isaac Melson Meekins, Republican

=== Results ===
1924 North Carolina gubernatorial election
Party	Candidate	Votes	%	±%
Democratic	Angus Wilton McLean	294,441	61.33%	
Republican	Isaac Melson Meekins	185,627	38.67%	
Majority		108,814		
Turnout		480,068		
Democratic hold		Swing		
