= Franklin Taylor Dupree Jr. =

American judge (1913–1995)

Senior Judge of the United States District Court for the Eastern District of North Carolina
- In office December 31, 1983 – December 17, 1995

Chief Judge of the United States District Court for the Eastern District of North Carolina
- In office 1979–1983
- Preceded by: John Davis Larkins Jr.
- Succeeded by: William Earl Britt

Judge of the United States District Court for the Eastern District of North Carolina
- In office December 12, 1970 – December 31, 1983
- Appointed by: Richard Nixon
- Preceded by: Seat established by 84 Stat. 294
- Succeeded by: Terrence Boyle

Personal details
- Born: Franklin Taylor Dupree Jr. October 8, 1913 Angier, North Carolina
- Died: December 17, 1995 (aged 82) Raleigh, North Carolina
- Education: University of North Carolina at Chapel Hill (A.B.); University of North Carolina School of Law (LL.B.)

Franklin Taylor Dupree Jr. (October 8, 1913 – December 17, 1995) was a United States district judge of the United States District Court for the Eastern District of North Carolina.

== Education and career ==
Born in Angier, North Carolina, Dupree received an Artium Baccalaureus degree from the University of North Carolina at Chapel Hill in 1933 and a Bachelor of Laws from the University of North Carolina School of Law in 1936. He was in private practice in Angier and Raleigh, North Carolina from 1936 to 1943. He then served in the United States Naval Reserve during World War II, from 1943 to 1946, achieving the rank of Lieutenant. He returned to his private practice in Raleigh from 1946 to 1971.

== Federal judicial service ==
On November 30, 1970, Dupree was nominated by President Richard Nixon to a new seat on the United States District Court for the Eastern District of North Carolina created by 84 Stat. 294. He was confirmed by the United States Senate on December 11, 1970, and received his commission on December 12, 1970. He served as Chief Judge from 1979 to 1983, assuming senior status on December 31, 1983. Dupree served in that capacity until his death on December 17, 1995, in Raleigh.

== Sources ==
Legal offices
Preceded by Seat established by 84 Stat. 294	Judge of the United States District Court for the Eastern District of North Carolina; 1970–1983	Succeeded by Terrence Boyle
Preceded by John Davis Larkins Jr.	Chief Judge of the United States District Court for the Eastern District of North Carolina; 1979–1983	Succeeded by William Earl Britt
