= Bartholomew F. Moore =

American attorney and politician (1801–1878)

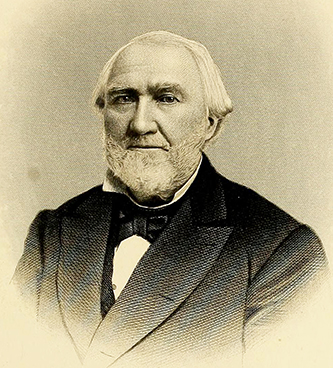
1880 engraving of Bartholomew Figures Moore

Bartholomew Figures Moore (January 29, 1801 – November 27, 1878) was an American attorney and politician. As a Whig, he served in the North Carolina legislature then as Attorney General of the state from 1848 to 1851. He also was head of the North Carolina Bar for several years, becoming known as "father of the bar". A Unionist, he staunchly and vocally opposed secession and the Confederacy.

== Early life ==
Moore was born January 29, 1801, in Halifax, North Carolina. His parents were Sally Lowe and James Moore, who served as a sailor in the Revolutionary War. He attended Vine Hill Academy in Scotland Neck, North Carolina. He graduated from the University of North Carolina at Chapel Hill in 1820 and was admitted to the bar in 1823.

== Career ==
Moore began practicing law in Nashville, North Carolina. Initially unsuccessful, he gained a reputation as a skilled attorney in the 1834 North Carolina v. Negro Will case invoking slave's rights which gained national interest. The case center around Will, a slave who was convicted of murdering his overseer. Following an altercation with another slave over a hoe, Will broke the hoe then left to resume work elsewhere. After learning of the incident, the overseer pursued Will on horseback; Will fled so the overseer shot him in the back. Eventually the overseer caught him and in the struggle the overseer was injured causing his death. Will was convicted of murder and sentenced to be hung as the lower court held a slave had no right to self-defense against a master. Representing the Will's owner on appeal, Moore successfully argued before the North Carolina Supreme Court a slave had the right the defend himself from his overseer if under threat of life, thus not murder arguing "Absolute power is irresponsible power, circumscribed by no limits save its own imbecility". In the decision written by Justice William Gaston, the court agreed and ordered a new trial. In a 1939 retrospective, The News and Observer called Moore's brief and oral arguments "a masterpiece of law and logic".

In 1835 Moore returned to Halifax opening a practice there. A Whig, Moore was elected to the House of Commons in 1836 representing Halifax but was defeated in 1838. He was re-elected in 1840 serving three terms until 1846. In 1848, he moved to Raleigh and became head of the North Carolina Bar, succeeding then United States senator George E. Badger. In that same year, Moore was appointed Attorney General by then Governor William Graham to replace Edward Stanly who had resigned. Moore left the office in 1851 to join the commission to revise North Carolina's statutes along with Asa Biggs and Romulus M. Saunders, codifying the Revised Code of North Carolina enacted by the General Assembly in 1854.

=== Civil War ===
"Civil war can be glorious news to none but demons, or thoughtless fools, or maddened men." — Bartholomew F. Moore, April 15, 1861

Moore continued his practice in Raleigh as the Civil War loomed. A Unionist, he staunchly and vocally opposed secession believing it was unconstitutional and detested the proposition of going to war, pleading to the public in letters to the press to keep the Union intact. After North Carolina joined the Confederate and war was a reality, Moore refused to accept Confederate money. When a judge required attorneys coming before the newly formed Federal court to plead oath to the Confederate States, Moore gathered his belongings and walked out.

=== Reconstruction era ===
In 1865 after the end of the war, President Andrew Johnson invited Moore, former governor David Swain and former attorney general William Eaton to Washington to consult about North Carolina and Reconstruction efforts. Moore was also elected to the North Carolina Constitutional Convention, called by Governor William Holden, representing Wake County.

Holden appointed Moore to lead the North Carolina Commission of the Freeman, a three person commission charged with recommending changes to North Carolina's law required for emancipated freedman. Often referred to as the "Black Codes", amendments to laws were required across the South during Reconstruction. To establish both equal rights and responsibilities as whites, the commission recommended repealing references to color. Major exceptions were interracial marriage was explicitly illegal and no provisions for the right to serve on juries or vote. Even so, the recommendations were considered the most liberal compared to other states and largely adopted by the legislature in 1866.

Moore was indignant when Richmond Pearson other justices of the North Carolina Supreme Court vocally supported the Republican Party, printing pamphlets encouraging people to vote for Ulysses Grant and making stump speeches warning violence might ensure from blacks against whites unless whites voted Republican. Firmly believing political partisanship caused great harm the court, Moore penned a letter in protest entitled “A solemn protest by the Bar of North Carolina against judicial interference in political affairs". Signed by 108 other prominent lawyers, it was published in the Raleigh Daily Sentinel in April 1869. The Supreme Court ordered twenty-five signatories, including Moore, be disbarred. In response, the parties stated they meant no harm to the court. The Court ordered Moore to pay court cost, stating "He is not acquitted, but excused".

In the decade after the war, Moore's practice mostly focused on Federal cases with his son-in-law joining the practice in 1871.

== Personal life ==
Moore married Louisa Boddie in 1828 who died in 1829. In 1835 he married Louisa's sister Lucy Williams Boddie with whom he had eleven children. Moore died November 27, 1878, following a long illness and buried at Oakwood Cemetery in Raleigh.

In his will he wrote:

"No man suffered greater misery than I did as the scenes of battle unfolded the bloody carnage in the midst of our homes. I had been taught there could be no reliable liberty of my State without the Union of the States and being devoted to my State I felt that I should desert her whenever I should aid to destroy the Union."
