= George Washington Brooks =

American judge

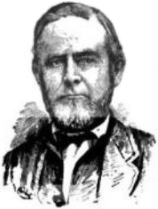

Judge of the United States District Court for the Eastern District of North Carolina
- In office June 4, 1872 – January 6, 1882
- Appointed by: operation of law
- Preceded by: Seat established by 17 Stat. 215
- Succeeded by: Augustus Sherrill Seymour

Judge of the United States District Court for the District of North Carolina
- In office August 19, 1865 – June 4, 1872
- Appointed by: Andrew Johnson
- Preceded by: Asa Biggs
- Succeeded by: Seat abolished

Personal details
- Born: March 16, 1821 Elizabeth City, North Carolina, U.S.
- Died: January 6, 1882 (aged 60) Elizabeth City, North Carolina, U.S.
- Party: Democratic
- Education: read law

George Washington Brooks (March 16, 1821 – January 6, 1882) was a United States district judge of the United States District Court for the Albemarle, Cape Fear and Pamptico Districts of North Carolina and the United States District Court for the Eastern District of North Carolina.

== Education and career ==
Born in Elizabeth City, North Carolina, Brooks read law to enter the bar in 1846. He was then in private practice in Elizabeth City until 1865, also serving as a member of the North Carolina House of Commons (now the North Carolina House of Representatives) in 1852, and from 1865 to 1866.

== Federal judicial service ==
Brooks received a recess appointment from President Andrew Johnson on August 19, 1865, to a seat on the United States District Court for the Albemarle, Cape Fear and Pamptico Districts of North Carolina (also referenced officially as the United States District Court for the District of North Carolina) vacated by Judge Asa Biggs. He was nominated to the same position by President Johnson on December 20, 1865. He was confirmed by the United States Senate on January 22, 1866, and received his commission the same day. Brooks was reassigned by operation of law to the United States District Court for the Eastern District of North Carolina on June 4, 1872, to a new seat authorized by 17 Stat. 215. His service terminated on January 6, 1882, due to his death in Elizabeth City.

== Sources ==
Legal offices
| Preceded by Asa Biggs | Judge of the United States District Court for the District of North Carolina; 1865–1872 | Succeeded by Seat abolished |
| Preceded by Seat established by 17 Stat. 215 | Judge of the United States District Court for the Eastern District of North Carolina; 1872–1882 | Succeeded by Augustus Sherrill Seymour |
