= Thomas Walker (attorney) =

American attorney

Thomas G. Walker
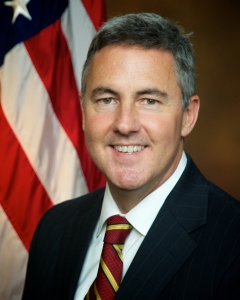

United States Attorney for the Eastern District of North Carolina
- In office 2011–2016
- Appointed by: Barack Obama
- Preceded by: George Holding
- Succeeded by: Robert Higdon Jr.

Personal details
- Born: Thomas Gray Walker; 1964 (age 61–62) Atlanta, Georgia, U.S.
- Education: Baylor University (BA); Campbell University School of Law (JD)

Thomas Gray Walker (born 1964) was the United States Attorney for the Eastern District of North Carolina.

== Early life and education ==
Walker was born in 1964 in Atlanta, Georgia. Walker graduated from Baylor University (1986) and the Norman Adrian Wiggins School of Law at Campbell University (1990).

== Career ==
At the time of his confirmation in 2011, Walker was a partner at Alston & Bird, LLP, where he had worked since 2003. Prior to that, Walker worked as special counsel to North Carolina Attorney General Roy A. Cooper, from 2001 to 2003. He also served as an Assistant United States Attorney for the Western District of North Carolina from 1994 to 2001 and an Assistant District Attorney for Mecklenburg County, North Carolina, from 1990 to 1994.

Walker announced his intention on December 22, 2015, to resign his post as United States Attorney for the Eastern District of North Carolina effective January 7, 2016.

Legal offices
Preceded by George Holding	United States Attorney for the Eastern District of North Carolina; 2011–2016	Succeeded by Robert Higdon Jr.
