= Romulus M. Saunders =

American politician (1791–1867)

Romulus Mitchell Saunders
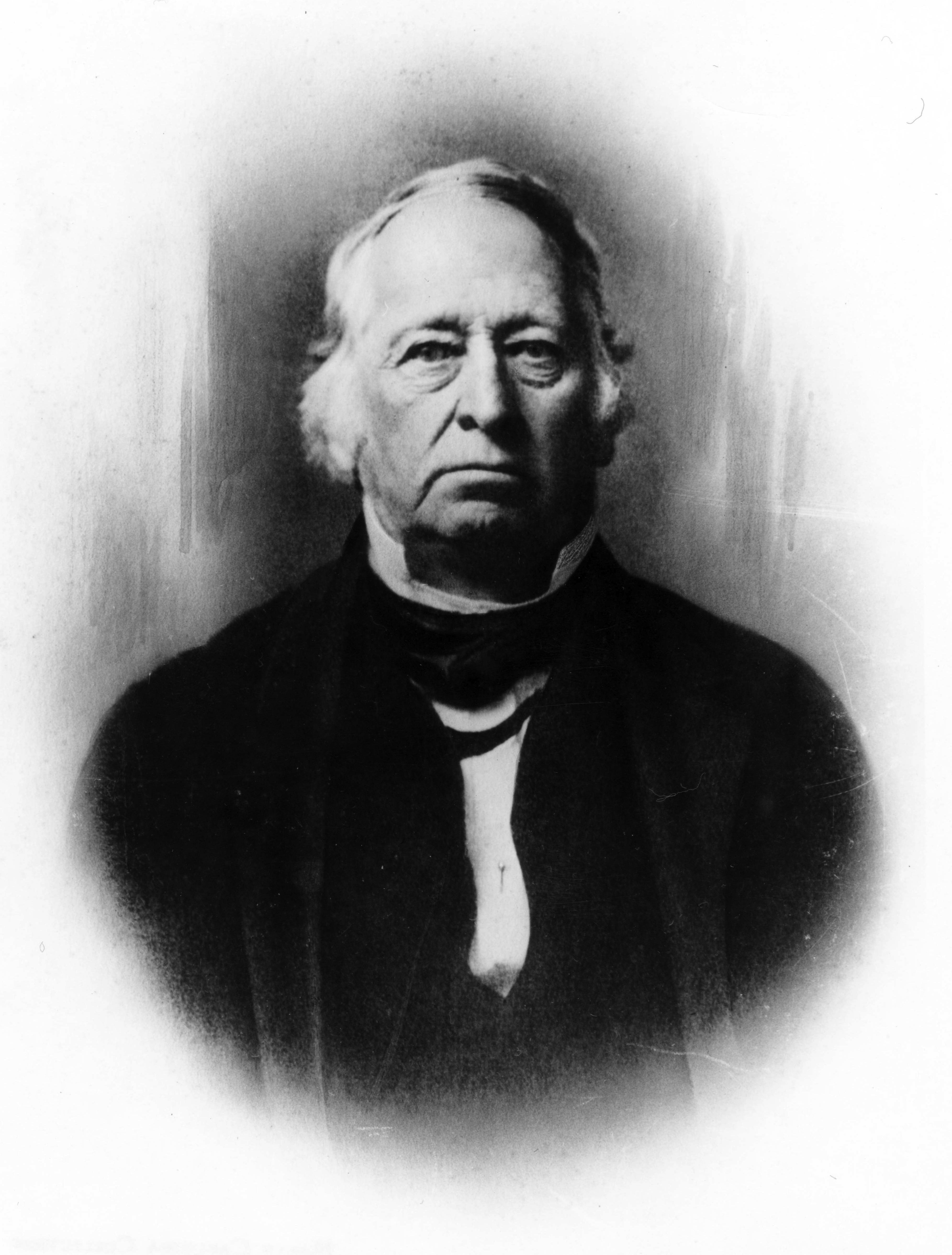

Judge of the North Carolina Superior Court
- In office 1852–1856
- In office 1835–1840

11th United States Minister to Spain
- In office July 31, 1846 – September 24, 1849
- President: James K. Polk; Zachary Taylor
- Preceded by: Washington Irving
- Succeeded by: Daniel M. Barringer

Chair of the House Judiciary Committee
- In office 1844–1845
- Preceded by: William Wilkins
- Succeeded by: George O. Rathbun

13th Attorney General of North Carolina
- In office 1828–1834
- Governor: John Owen; Montfort Stokes; David Lowry Swain
- Preceded by: Robert H. Jones
- Succeeded by: John Reeves Jones Daniels

Member of the U.S. House of Representatives from North Carolina
- In office March 4, 1841 – March 3, 1845
- Preceded by: William Montgomery
- Succeeded by: James C. Dobbin
- Constituency: 8th district (1841-1843); 5th district (1843-1845)
- In office March 4, 1821 – March 3, 1827
- Preceded by: Thomas Settle
- Succeeded by: Augustine H. Shepperd
- Constituency: 9th district

Speaker of the North Carolina House of Commons
- In office November 15, 1819 – December 25, 1820
- Preceded by: James Iredell Jr.
- Succeeded by: James Mebane

Member of the North Carolina Senate from Caswell County
- In office November 18, 1816 – December 28, 1816
- Preceded by: B. Graves
- Succeeded by: Bartlett Yancey

Member of the North Carolina House of Commons
- In office November 20, 1848 – December 27, 1852
- Preceded by: Berry D. Sims; Rufus H. Jones
- Succeeded by: Jacob Mordecai; Nathaniel G. Rand; W.W. Whitaker
- Constituency: Wake County
- In office November 17, 1817 – December 25, 1820
- Preceded by: W. Watkins
- Succeeded by: Quinten Anderson
- Constituency: Caswell County
- In office November 20, 1815 – December 21, 1815
- Preceded by: John P. Harrison
- Succeeded by: W. Watkins
- Constituency: Caswell County

Personal details
- Born: March 3, 1791 Caswell County, North Carolina, U.S.
- Died: April 21, 1867 (aged 76) Raleigh, North Carolina, U.S.
- Party: Democratic
- Spouses: Rebecca Payne Carter (m. 1812) Anne Hayes Johnson (m. 1823)
- Children: 9
- Parents: William Saunders (father); Hannah Mitchell Saunders (mother)
- Education: University of North Carolina at Chapel Hill

Romulus Mitchell Saunders (March 3, 1791 – April 21, 1867) was an American politician from North Carolina.

== Early life and education ==
Saunders was born near Milton, Caswell County, North Carolina, the son of William and Hannah Mitchell Saunders. His mother died when Romulus was an infant, and his father subsequently moved him to Sumner County, Tennessee. Following his father's death in 1803, uncle James Saunders became legal guardian and brought Romulus back to Caswell County to attend Hyco and Caswell Academies. In 1809, Saunders enrolled at the University of North Carolina at Chapel Hill. He was expelled in March 1810 for firing a pistol on campus and throwing "a stone at the Faculty". Nine years later, Saunders would be elected to the university's board of trustees, where he served for forty-five years.

== Career ==
=== Early career ===
After his expulsion, Saunders moved to Tennessee and read law under future Senator Hugh Lawson White. He was admitted to the bar in Nashville in 1812 and returned to Caswell County the same year. In 1815, he was elected to the North Carolina House of Commons and soon after the North Carolina Senate. In 1818 he returned to the House and served as Speaker of the House from 1819 to 1820.

=== U.S. House of Representatives ===
Saunders was elected to the U.S. House of Representatives in 1820. As a congressman, Saunders was known for his unabashed pro-states' rights opinions. Saunders was such a staunch supporter of William H. Crawford's presidential campaign in the 1824 election that the eventual winner John Quincy Adams referred to the congressman as the most "cankered or venomous reptile in the country". As an admirer of Nathaniel Macon, Saunders was a fiscal conservative, believing that "men in power are apt to think the peoples' money is intended to be expended in such way as their distempered fancy may support". Despite this, Saunders supported internal improvements such as roads and railroads projects.

=== State government ===
In 1828, Saunders left Congress to become North Carolina Attorney General. He left the post in 1834 after receiving a presidential appointment on the French spoliations claims commission. The state legislature appointed Saunders to the North Carolina Superior Court in 1835 – an office he held until 1840 when he became the Democratic nominee for Governor of North Carolina. After a contentious campaign, Saunders was defeated by Whig nominee John Motley Morehead. During his time in state government, the North Carolina Democratic Party split into two factions. Saunders led the states' rights faction, which believed in the ideas of John C. Calhoun. The more moderate wing was led by Bedford Brown, a fellow Caswell native and political enemy to Saunders. When Democrats gained control of the state legislature in 1842, both Brown and Saunders ran for the U.S. Senate seat. Neither man received a majority of votes, and the seat went to William Henry Haywood Jr.

=== Return to Congress ===
Saunders returned to Congress following his election in 1840, where he became an outspoken opponent of Martin Van Buren and his allies who opposed the annexation of Texas. At the 1844 Democratic National Convention, Saunders sponsored a resolution requiring a two-thirds vote for the selection of a presidential candidate. This paved the way for the nomination of James K. Polk.

=== Minister to Spain ===
Perhaps as an act of appreciation for helping him win the Democratic presidential nomination, President Polk appointed Saunders as minister plenipotentiary to Spain in 1846. This coincided with the nation's increasing desire to procure Cuba, not only in the context of manifest destiny but also in the interest of Southern power. Cuba, with some half a million slaves, would provide Southerners with extra leverage in Congress. In the late 1840s, President James K. Polk dispatched Saunders with a mission to offer $100 million to buy Cuba. Saunders however did not speak Spanish, and as then Secretary of State James Buchanan noted "even [English] he sometimes murders". Saunders was a clumsy negotiator, which both entertained and angered the Spanish. Spain replied that they would "prefer seeing [Cuba] sunk in the ocean" than sold. It may have been a moot point anyway, as it is unlikely that the Whig majority House would have accepted such an obviously pro-Southern move. The 1848 election of Zachary Taylor, a Whig, ended formal attempts to purchase the island.

=== Return to state government ===
Saunders moved to Raleigh, North Carolina, and in 1850 was elected to represent Wake County in the House of Commons. As representative, Saunders became a supporter of constructing the North Carolina Railroad. Saunders again attempted to be appointed to the U.S. Senate in 1852. The legislature could not agree on whom to appoint, and the seat remained open until the appointment of David Settle Reid in 1854. The legislature did, however, reappoint Saunders to the Superior Court. He was a member of a commission to codify North Carolina laws in 1851 along with Bartholomew F. Moore and Asa Biggs.

== Personal life ==
Saunders married Rebecca Peine Carter on December 27, 1812. The marriage produced five children: James, Franklin, Camillus, Anne Peine, and Rebecca. Rebecca later died, and Saunders married Anne Heyes Johnson (the daughter of William Johnson) on May 26, 1823. The couple had at least four children: William Johnson, Margaret Madeline, Jane Claudia, and Julia A. Around 1831, the Saunders family purchased the Elmwood estate in Raleigh – the former home of John Louis Taylor. Saunders died there on April 21, 1867, and was buried in the Old City Cemetery.

Party political offices
| Preceded by John Branch | Democratic nominee for Governor of North Carolina; 1840 | Succeeded by Louis D. Henry |
Legal offices
| Preceded by Robert H. Jones | Attorney General of North Carolina; 1828–1834 | Succeeded by John Reeves Jones Daniel |
U.S. House of Representatives
| Preceded by Thomas Settle | Member of the U.S. House of Representatives from North Carolina's 9th congressional district 1821 – 1827 | Succeeded by Augustine H. Shepperd |
| Preceded by William Montgomery | Member of the U.S. House of Representatives from North Carolina's 8th congressional district 1841 – 1843 | Succeeded by Archibald H. Arrington |
| Preceded by James I. McKay | Member of the U.S. House of Representatives from North Carolina's 5th congressional district 1843 – 1845 | Succeeded by James C. Dobbin |
Diplomatic posts
| Preceded by Washington Irving | U.S. Minister to Spain; 1846–1849 | Succeeded by Daniel M. Barringer |
