= Richard E. Myers II =

American federal judge (born 1967)

Richard Myers
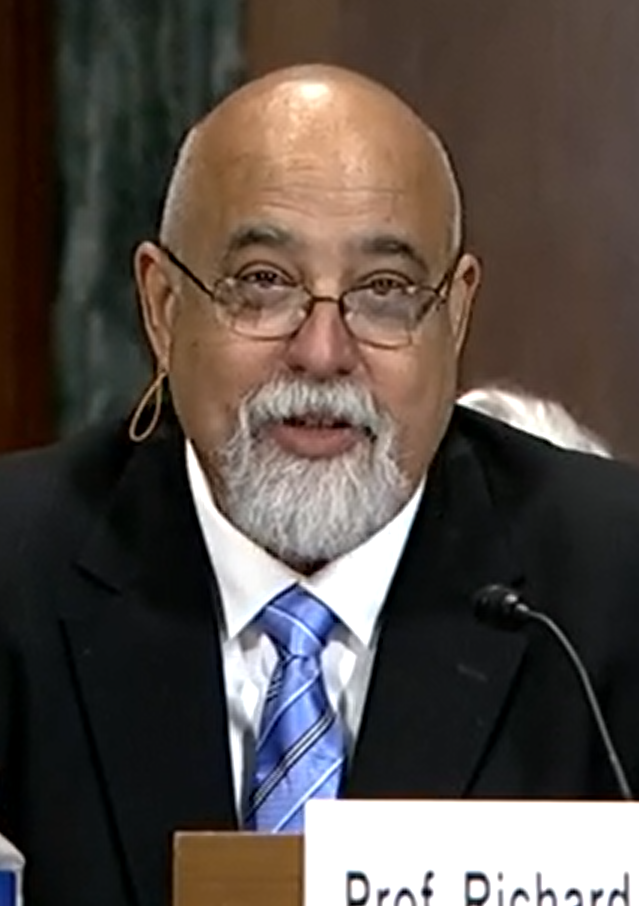

Chief Judge of the United States District Court for the Eastern District of North Carolina
- Incumbent
- Assumed office January 1, 2021
- Preceded by: Terrence Boyle

Judge of the United States District Court for the Eastern District of North Carolina
- Incumbent
- Assumed office December 10, 2019
- Appointed by: Donald Trump
- Preceded by: Malcolm Jones Howard

Personal details
- Born: Richard Ernest Myers II; 1967 (age 58–59) Kingston, Jamaica
- Education: University of North Carolina, Wilmington (BA, MA); University of North Carolina, Chapel Hill (JD)

Richard Ernest Myers II (born 1967) is an American lawyer and jurist serving as the chief United States district judge of the United States District Court for the Eastern District of North Carolina. He was appointed in 2019 by President Donald Trump, and he has been the chief judge of the district court since 2021. Before his appointment, Myers was a professor at the University of North Carolina School of Law.

== Early life and education ==
Myers was born in 1967 in Kingston, Jamaica. He moved with his family to Wilmington, North Carolina, as a child. His voter registration states that he belongs to "two or more races."

Myers graduated from the University of North Carolina at Wilmington in 1989 with a Bachelor of Arts, summa cum laude, followed by a Master of Arts in 1994. He worked as a reporter for the Star-News from 1991 to 1995, where he covered the murder of James R. Jordan Sr., the father of Michael Jordan. He then attended the University of North Carolina School of Law, where he was an articles editor for the North Carolina Law Review. He graduated in 1998 with a Juris Doctor, magna cum laude, and Order of the Coif membership.

== Career ==
Upon graduation from law school, Myers served as a law clerk to Judge David B. Sentelle of the United States Court of Appeals for the District of Columbia Circuit. He then worked in private practice at O'Melveny & Myers. He previously served as an Assistant United States Attorney for the Central District of California and later the Eastern District of North Carolina. While a federal prosecutor, Myers prosecuted a wide variety of crimes including counterfeiting, narcotics, and firearms offenses. Myers was the Henry Brandis Distinguished Professor of Law and Director of Trial Advocacy at the University of North Carolina School of Law, where his teaching and scholarship focused on criminal law. He joined UNC as a faculty member in 2004, and left in 2019 upon becoming a judge.

At UNC, Myers served as the advisor to the law school's Federalist Society chapter.

=== Federal judicial service ===
On August 14, 2019, President Donald Trump announced his intent to nominate Myers to serve as a United States district judge for the United States District Court for the Eastern District of North Carolina. On September 9, 2019, his nomination was sent to the Senate. He has been nominated to the seat vacated by Malcolm Jones Howard, who assumed senior status on December 31, 2005. Myers was nominated to a seat that had been vacant since December 31, 2005, at the time was the longest federal judicial vacancy. On September 11, 2019, a hearing on his nomination was held before the Senate Judiciary Committee. On October 31, 2019, his nomination was reported out of committee by a 16–6 vote. On December 4, 2019, the United States Senate invoked cloture on his nomination by a 72–22 vote. On December 5, 2019, his nomination was confirmed by a 68–21 vote. He received his judicial commission on December 10, 2019. Myers became chief judge in January 2021. He maintains chambers in Wilmington.

== Memberships ==
Myers has been a member of the Federalist Society since 2004. He has been a member of the National Rifle Association of America since 2010. He has been a member of the Christian Legal Society since 2004, of which he serves as a faculty advisor.

== Review of judicial rulings ==
In 2022, Myers concluded that a Civil War amnesty law passed by Congress in 1872 essentially repealed the 14th Amendment's "disqualification clause," which prohibited officeholders from returning to elected positions if they supported an insurrection. Myers agreed that the Amnesty Act of 1872 applied not only retroactively to Confederate officials, but also in perpetuity regarding future rebellions. This interpretation was later rejected by an appeals court, which ruled that this law applied only to people who committed "constitutionally wrongful acts" before 1872.

== See also ==
- List of African-American federal judges
- List of African-American jurists

Legal offices
Preceded by Malcolm Jones Howard	Judge of the United States District Court for the Eastern District of North Carolina; 2019–present	Incumbent
Preceded by Terrence Boyle	Chief Judge of the United States District Court for the Eastern District of North Carolina; 2021–present	Incumbent
