= McDonald, North Carolina =

- Town
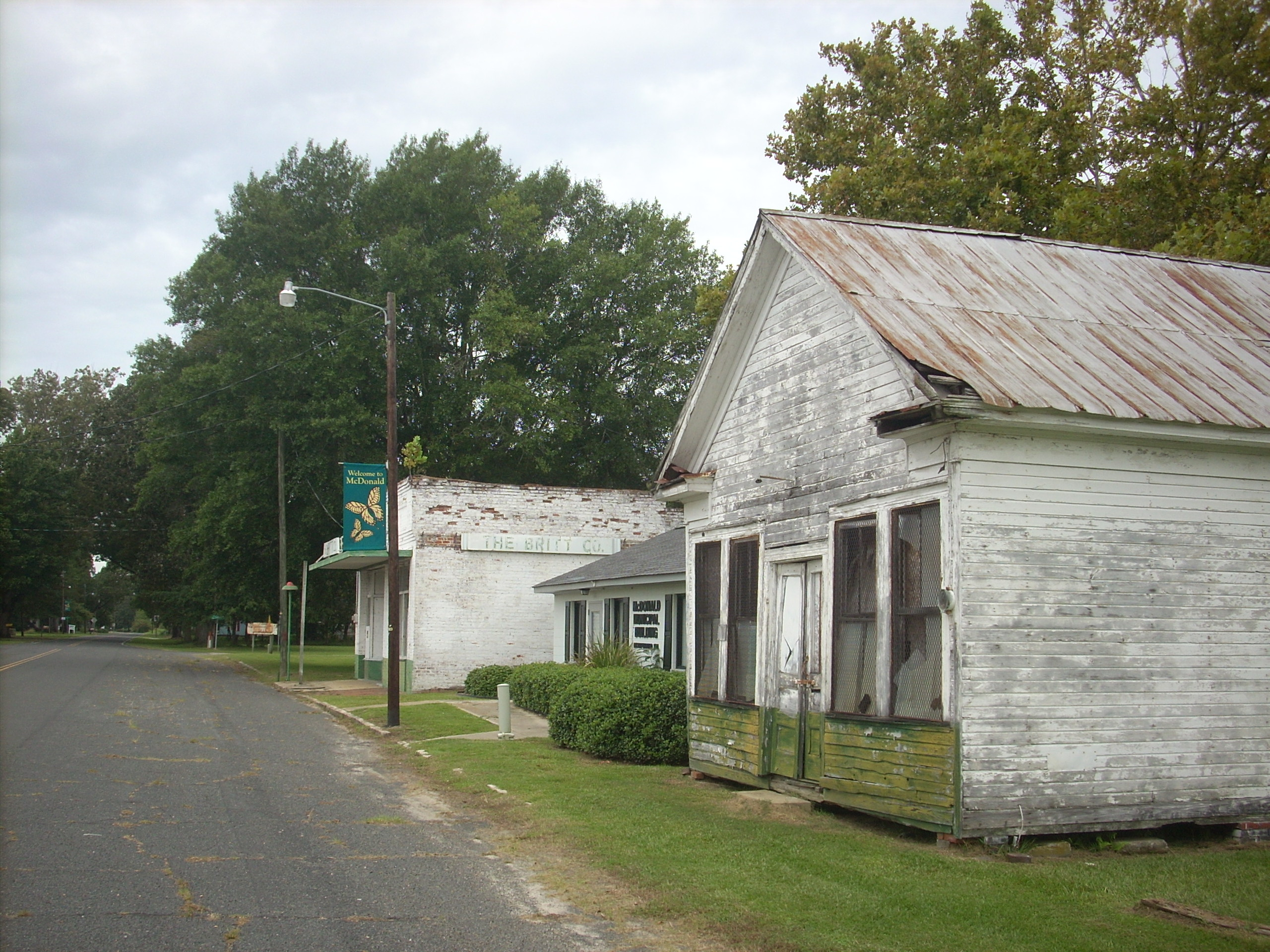
- Main Street in McDonald

- Location within the state of North Carolina
- Coordinates: 34°33′13″N 79°10′35″W
- Country: United States
- State: North Carolina
- County: Robeson

Government
  - Mayor: James R. Taylor

Area
  - Total: 0.25 sq mi (0.66 km^{2})
  - Land: 0.25 sq mi (0.66 km^{2})
  - Water: 0 sq mi (0.00 km^{2})
- Elevation: 144 ft (44 m)

Population (2020)
  - Total: 94
  - Density: 368.5/sq mi (142.29/km^{2})
- Time zone: UTC-5 (Eastern (EST))
  - Summer (DST): UTC-4 (EDT)
- ZIP code: 28340
- Area codes: 910, 472
- FIPS code: 37-40140
- GNIS feature ID: 2406128

McDonald is a town in Robeson County, North Carolina, United States. The population was 94 at the 2020 census.

== History ==
The community was settled after the American Revolutionary War and later named for P. K. McDonald, who opened the town's first mercantile store and a turpentine distillery in 1893. The town was incorporated in 1911.

== Geography ==
According to the United States Census Bureau, the town has a total area of 0.3 square miles (0.78 km^{2}), all land.

== Demographics ==
Historical population
Census	Pop.	Note	%±
1920	120		—
1930	141		17.5%
1940	127		−9.9%
1950	78		−38.6%
1960	79		1.3%
1970	80		1.3%
1980	117		46.3%
1990	88		−24.8%
2000	119		35.2%
2010	113		−5.0%
2020	94		−16.8%
U.S. Decennial Census

As of the census of 2000, there were 119 people, 40 households, and 37 families residing in the town. The population density was 455.6 inhabitants per square mile (175.9/km^{2}). There were 41 housing units at an average density of 157.0 per square mile (60.6/km^{2}). The racial makeup of the town was 36.13% White, 10.92% African American, 52.10% Native American and 0.84% Pacific Islander. Hispanic or Latino of any race were 0.84% of the population.

There were 40 households, out of which 27.5% had children under the age of 18 living with them, 67.5% were married couples living together, 22.5% had a female householder with no husband present, and 7.5% were non-families. 7.5% of all households were made up of individuals, and 5.0% had someone living alone who was 65 years of age or older. The average household size was 2.98 and the average family size was 3.08.

In the town, the population was spread out, with 26.9% under the age of 18, 8.4% from 18 to 24, 26.1% from 25 to 44, 21.0% from 45 to 64, and 17.6% who were 65 years of age or older. The median age was 36 years. For every 100 females, there were 91.9 males. For every 100 females age 18 and over, there were 81.3 males.

The median income for a household in the town was $37,083, and the median income for a family was $37,917. Males had a median income of $22,917 versus $26,875 for females. The per capita income for the town was $15,396. None of the population and none of the families were below the poverty line.
