= Louise Flanagan =

American judge (born 1962)

Louise Wood Flanagan

Judge of the United States District Court for the Eastern District of North Carolina
- Incumbent
- Assumed office July 18, 2003
- Appointed by: George W. Bush
- Preceded by: James C. Fox

Magistrate Judge of the United States District Court for the Eastern District of North Carolina
- In office 1995–2003

Personal details
- Born: Louise Wood Flanagan; June 26, 1962 (age 63) Richmond, Virginia
- Education: Wake Forest University (BA); University of Virginia School of Law (JD)

Louise Wood Flanagan (born June 26, 1962) is a United States district judge of the United States District Court for the Eastern District of North Carolina.

== Early life and education ==
Flanagan was born in Richmond, Virginia. She graduated from Wake Forest University with her Bachelor of Arts degree in 1984 and later from University of Virginia School of Law with a Juris Doctor in 1988.

== Career ==
Following law school graduation, Flanagan served as a law clerk for Judge Malcolm Jones Howard of the United States District Court for the Eastern District of North Carolina from 1988 to 1989. She was a private practice attorney in Washington, D.C. from 1989 to 1990 and North Carolina from 1990 to 1999.

=== Federal judicial service ===
Between 1995 and 2003, Flanagan served as a United States magistrate judge for the United States District Court for the Eastern District of North Carolina. Flanagan was nominated to the United States District Court for the Eastern District of North Carolina by President George W. Bush on January 29, 2003, to a seat vacated by Judge James Carroll Fox. She was confirmed by the Senate on July 17, 2003, and received her commission the next day.

== Sources ==
Legal offices
Preceded by James Carroll Fox	Judge of the United States District Court for the Eastern District of North Carolina; 2003–present	Incumbent
