= Henry G. Connor =

American judge and politician (1852–1924)

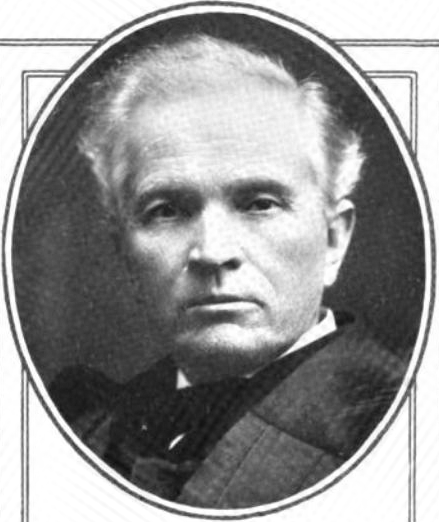

Judge of the United States District Court for the Eastern District of North Carolina
- In office May 25, 1909 – November 23, 1924
- Appointed by: William Howard Taft
- Preceded by: Thomas Richard Purnell
- Succeeded by: Isaac Melson Meekins

Personal details
- Born: Henry Groves Connor; July 3, 1852 Wilmington, North Carolina, U.S.
- Died: November 23, 1924 (aged 72) Wilson, North Carolina, U.S.
- Spouse: Bessie Hadley (m. 1894)
- Children: 4, including Robert

Henry Groves Connor (July 3, 1852 – November 23, 1924) was an American judge and politician who served as a United States district judge of the United States District Court for the Eastern District of North Carolina.

== Early life ==
Born on July 3, 1852, in Wilmington, North Carolina, Connor read law in 1871.

== Career ==
He entered private practice in Wilson, North Carolina from 1871 to 1885. He was a member of the North Carolina Senate in 1885. He was a Judge of the North Carolina Superior Court from 1885 to 1893. He returned to private practice in Wilson from 1893 to 1903. He was a member of the North Carolina House of Representatives from 1899 to 1901, serving as Speaker in 1901. He was an associate justice of the Supreme Court of North Carolina from 1903 to 1909.

=== Federal judicial service ===
Connor was nominated by President William Howard Taft on May 10, 1909, to a seat on the United States District Court for the Eastern District of North Carolina vacated by Judge Thomas Richard Purnell. He was confirmed by the United States Senate on May 25, 1909, and received his commission the same day. His service terminated on November 23, 1924, due to his death in Wilson.

=== Books ===
Connor was a published author. Among his works were biographies of John Archibald Campbell, James Iredell, and William Gaston.

=== Sympathy for the Confederacy ===
In April 1911, Judge Connor delivered the dedication speech for a Confederate monument to politician George Davis in Wilmington, North Carolina.

Connor's dedicatory remarks contained hallmarks that many historians have ascribed to examples of revisionist Lost Cause mythology. Connor falsely described Davis's making war against the United States as "patriotism" and Davis's call for secession from the Union as "moderation in speech":

You shall bring your sons to this spot, tell them the story of his life, of his patriotism of his loyalty to high thinking and noble living, of his moderation in speech, his patience under defeat, of his devotion to your City and State as a perpetual illustration and an enduring example of the dignity, the worth of a high-souled, pure-hearted Christian gentleman.

== Personal life and death ==
Connor married Bessie Hadley on May 30, 1894, and they had four children, including Robert Digges Wimberly Connor.

He died on November 23, 1934 in Wilson, North Carolina.

Legal offices
Preceded by Thomas Richard Purnell	Judge of the United States District Court for the Eastern District of North Carolina; 1909–1924	Succeeded by Isaac Melson Meekins
