= Thomas Richard Purnell =

United States federal judge

Judge of the United States District Court for the Eastern District of North Carolina
- In office May 5, 1897 – December 19, 1908
- Appointed by: William McKinley
- Preceded by: Augustus Sherrill Seymour
- Succeeded by: Henry G. Connor

Member of the North Carolina House of Representatives
- In office 1876-1877

Personal details
- Born: Thomas Richard Purnell; November 11, 1847 Wilmington, North Carolina
- Died: December 19, 1908 (aged 61) Raleigh, North Carolina
- Education: Duke University read law

Thomas Richard Purnell (November 11, 1847 – December 19, 1908) was a United States district judge of the United States District Court for the Eastern District of North Carolina.

== Education and career ==
Born in Wilmington, North Carolina, Purnell graduated from Trinity College (now Duke University) in 1869 and read law to enter the bar that same year. He was in private practice in Baltimore, Maryland and Salem, North Carolina from 1870 to 1873. He was a librarian for the State of North Carolina in Raleigh from 1873 to 1876, thereafter resuming his private practice in Raleigh until 1897. He served the North Carolina House of Representatives from 1876 to 1877. He was a Commissioner for the United States Circuit Courts for the Fourth Circuit from 1877 to 1891. He was a member of the North Carolina Senate from 1883 to 1884. He was an unsuccessful candidate for Attorney General of North Carolina in 1892.

== Federal judicial service ==
On April 26, 1897, Purnell was nominated by President William McKinley to a seat on the United States District Court for the Eastern District of North Carolina vacated by Judge Augustus Sherrill Seymour. Purnell was confirmed by the United States Senate on May 5, 1897, and received his commission the same day. Purnell served in that capacity until his death on December 19, 1908, in Raleigh.

== Sources ==
Party political offices
Preceded by James C. Reid	Republican nominee for North Carolina Superintendent of Public Instruction; 1874	Succeeded by John C. Carson
Preceded by Thomas P. Devereux Jr.	Republican nominee for Attorney General of North Carolina; 1892	Succeeded by Zeb V. Walser
Legal offices
Preceded by Augustus Sherrill Seymour	Judge of the United States District Court for the Eastern District of North Carolina; 1897–1908	Succeeded by Henry G. Connor
