= United States District Court for the Eastern District of North Carolina =

United States federal district court in North Carolina

- (E.D.N.C.)
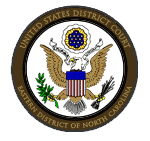
- Location: Raleigh More locations: Greenville; United States Post Office and Courthouse (New Bern); Alton Lennon Federal Building and Courthouse (Wilmington); Elizabeth City; Fayetteville; Wilson
- Appeals to: Fourth Circuit
- Established: June 4, 1872
- Judges: 4
- Chief Judge: Richard E. Myers II

Officers of the court
- U.S. Attorney: W. Ellis Boyle
- U.S. Marshal: Glenn M. McNeill Jr.
- www.nced.uscourts.gov

The United States District Court for the Eastern District of North Carolina (in case citations, E.D.N.C.) is the United States district court that serves the eastern 44 counties in North Carolina. Appeals from the Eastern District of North Carolina are taken to the United States Court of Appeals for the Fourth Circuit (except for patent claims and claims against the U.S. government under the Tucker Act, which are appealed to the Federal Circuit).

== Jurisdiction and offices ==
The District has three staffed offices and holds court in six cities: Elizabeth City, Fayetteville, Greenville, New Bern, Raleigh, and Wilmington. Its main office is in Raleigh. It is broken down into four divisions. The eastern division is headquartered in Greenville and handles cases from Beaufort, Carteret, Craven, Edgecombe, Greene, Halifax, Hyde, Jones, Lenoir, Martin, Pamlico, Nash and Pitt counties.

The southern division is based in Wilmington and serves the counties of: Bladen, Brunswick, Columbus, Duplin, New Hanover, Onslow, Pender, Robeson, and Sampson. Its cases are heard in Wilmington.

The northern and western divisions are based in Raleigh. The western covers: Cumberland, Franklin, Granville, Harnett, Johnston, Vance, Wake, Warren, Wayne, and Wilson counties. Its cases are heard in Fayetteville, Greenville, and New Bern. The northern division presides over cases from: Bertie, Camden, Chowan, Currituck, Dare, Gates, Hertford, Northampton, Pasquotank, Perquimans, Tyrrell and Washington counties. Its cases are heard in Elizabeth City.

Pleadings are accepted for all divisions in any of the offices in Raleigh, Greenville, New Bern, or Wilmington.

== History ==
The United States District Court for the District of North Carolina was established on June 4, 1790, by 1 Stat. 126. On June 9, 1794, it was subdivided into three districts by 1 Stat. 395, but on March 3, 1797, the three districts were abolished and the single District restored by 1 Stat. 517, until April 29, 1802, when the state was again subdivided into three different districts by 2 Stat. 156.

In both instances, these districts, unlike those with geographic designations that existed in other states, were titled by the names of the cities in which the courts sat. After the first division, they were styled the District of Edenton, the District of New Bern, and the District of Wilmington; after the second division, they were styled the District of Albemarle, the District of Cape Fear, and the District of Pamptico. However, in both instances, only one judge was authorized to serve all three districts, causing them to effectively operate as a single district. The latter combination was occasionally referred to by the cumbersome title of the United States District Court for the Albemarle, Cape Fear & Pamptico Districts of North Carolina.

On June 4, 1872, North Carolina was re-divided into two Districts, Eastern and Western, by 17 Stat. 215. The presiding judge of the District of North Carolina, George Washington Brooks, was then reassigned to preside over only the Eastern District. The Middle District was created from portions of the Eastern and Western Districts on March 2, 1927, by 44 Stat. 1339.

On July 6, 2021, under Public Law 117-26, 135 Stat. 299, portions of Hoke, Moore, Scotland, and Richmond counties within the Fort Bragg Military Reservation and Camp Mackall were transferred into the Eastern District from the Middle District to end the previous situation where Fort Bragg was covered by two different districts.

== Current judges ==
As of January 12, 2025:

#	Title	Judge	Duty station	Born	Term of service			Appointed by
#	Title	Judge	Duty station	Born	Active	Chief	Senior	Appointed by
16	Chief Judge	Richard E. Myers II	Wilmington	1967	2019–present	2021–present	—	Trump
12	District Judge	Terrence Boyle	Elizabeth City	1945	1984–present	1997–2004; 2018–2021	—	Reagan
14	District Judge	Louise Flanagan	New Bern	1962	2003–present	2004–2011	—	G.W. Bush
15	District Judge	James C. Dever III	Raleigh	1962	2005–present	2011–2018	—	G.W. Bush
10	Senior Judge	William Earl Britt	inactive	1932	1980–1997	1983–1990	1997–present	Carter

== Vacancies and pending nominations ==
Seat	Prior judge's duty station	Seat last held by	Vacancy reason	Date of vacancy	Nominee	Date of nomination
3	Elizabeth City	Terrence Boyle	Senior status	TBD	Brian S. Meyers	November 9, 2026

== Former judges ==
#	Judge	Born–died	Active service	Chief Judge	Senior status	Appointed by	Reason for termination
1	George Washington Brooks	1821–1882	1872–1882	—	—	A. Johnson/Operation of law	death
2	Augustus Sherrill Seymour	1836–1897	1882–1897	—	—	Arthur	death
3	Thomas Richard Purnell	1847–1908	1897–1908	—	—	McKinley	death
4	Henry G. Connor	1852–1924	1908–1924	—	—	Taft	death
5	Isaac Melson Meekins	1875–1946	1925–1945	—	1945–1946	Coolidge	death
6	Donnell Gilliam	1889–1960	1945–1959	—	1959–1960	Truman	death
7	Algernon Lee Butler	1905–1978	1959–1975	1961–1975	1975–1978	Eisenhower	death
8	John Davis Larkins Jr.	1909–1990	1961–1979	1975–1979	1979–1990	Kennedy	death
9	Franklin Taylor Dupree Jr.	1913–1995	1970–1983	1979–1983	1983–1995	Nixon	death
11	James Carroll Fox	1928–2019	1982–2001	1990–1997	2001–2019	Reagan	death
13	Malcolm Jones Howard	1939–2025	1988–2005	—	2005–2025	Reagan	death

== Chief judges ==
Chief judges have administrative responsibilities with respect to their district court. Unlike the Supreme Court, where one justice is specifically nominated to be chief, the office of chief judge rotates among the district court judges. To be chief, a judge must have been in active service on the court for at least one year, be under the age of 65, and have not previously served as chief judge.

A vacancy is filled by the judge highest in seniority among the group of qualified judges. The chief judge serves for a term of seven years, or until age 70, whichever occurs first. The age restrictions are waived if no members of the court would otherwise be qualified for the position.

When the office was created in 1948, the chief judge was the longest-serving judge who had not elected to retire, on what has since 1958 been known as senior status, or declined to serve as chief judge. After August 6, 1959, judges could not become or remain chief after turning 70 years old. The current rules have been in operation since October 1, 1982.

== Succession of seats ==
Seat 1
Seat reassigned from the Districts of North Carolina on June 4, 1872 by 17 Stat. 215
Brooks	1872–1882
Seymour	1882–1897
Purnell	1897–1908
Connor	1909–1924
Meekins	1925–1945
Gilliam	1945–1959
Butler	1959–1975
Seat abolished on August 2, 1975 (temporary judgeship expired)

Seat 2
Seat established on May 19, 1961 by 75 Stat. 80
Larkins, Jr.	1961–1979
Britt	1980–1997
Dever III	2005–present

Seat 3
Seat established on June 2, 1970 by 84 Stat. 294 (temporary)
Seat became permanent upon the abolition of Seat 1 on August 2, 1975
Dupree, Jr.	1970–1983
Boyle	1984–present

Seat 4
Seat established on October 20, 1978 by 92 Stat. 1629
Fox	1982–2001
Flanagan	2003–present

Seat 5
Seat established on July 10, 1984 by 98 Stat. 333 (temporary)
Seat made permanent on December 1, 1990 by 104 Stat. 5089
Howard	1988–2005
Myers II	2019–present

== U.S. attorneys for the Eastern District ==
- Richard C. Badger (1872–1878)
- J. W. Albertson (1878–1882)
- W. S. O. Robinson (1882–1885)
- Fabius H. Busbee (1885–1889)
- Charles A. Cooke (1889–1893)
- Charles B. Aycock (1893–1898)
- Claude M. Bernard (1898–1902)
- Harry Skinner (1902–1910)
- Herbert F. Seawell (1910–1913)
- Francis D. Winston (1913–1916)
- James O. Carr (1916–19)
- Thomas D. Warren (1919–20)
- E. F. Aydlett (1920–21)
- Irvin B. Tucker (1921–30)
- Walter H. Fisher (1930–34)
- James O. Carr (1934–45)
- Charles F. Rouse (1945–46)
- John H. Manning (1946–51)
- Charles P. Green (1951–53)
- Julian T. Gaskill (1953–61)
- Robert H. Cowen (1961–69)
- Warren H. Coolidge (1969–73)
- Thomas P. McNamara (1973–76)
- Carl L. Tilghman (1976–77)
- George M. Anderson (1977–1980)
- James L. Blackburn (1980–81)
- Sam Currin (1981–1987)
- J. Douglas McCullough (acting 1987-88)
- Margaret Currin (1988–1993)
- J. Douglas McCullough (acting, 1993)
- Janice McKenzie Cole (1994–2001)
- Frank Whitney (2002–2005)
- George Holding (2005–2011)
- Rudy Renfer (2009–2026)
- Thomas Walker (2011–2016)
- John Stuart Bruce (acting, 2016)
- Robert Higdon Jr. (2017–2021)
- Michael F. Easley Jr. (2021–2025)
- Daniel P. Bubar (acting, 2025)
- W. Ellis Boyle (2025–)

== See also ==
- Courts of North Carolina
- List of current United States district judges
- List of United States federal courthouses in North Carolina
