= Algernon Lee Butler =

American judge

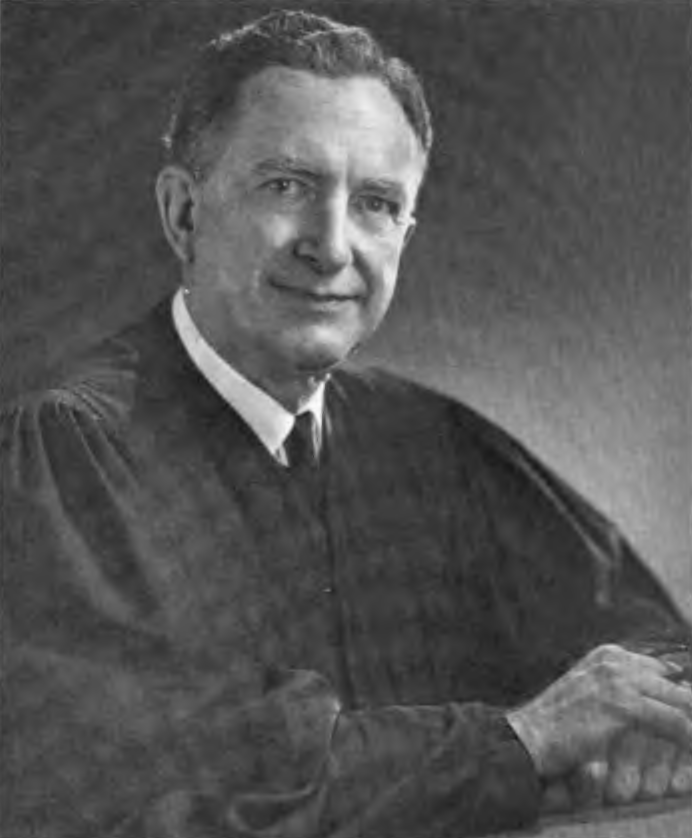

Senior Judge of the United States District Court for the Eastern District of North Carolina
- In office August 2, 1975 – September 5, 1978

Chief Judge of the United States District Court for the Eastern District of North Carolina
- In office 1961–1975
- Preceded by: Office established
- Succeeded by: John Davis Larkins Jr.

Judge of the United States District Court for the Eastern District of North Carolina
- In office August 31, 1959 – August 2, 1975
- Appointed by: Dwight D. Eisenhower
- Preceded by: Donnell Gilliam
- Succeeded by: Seat abolished

Personal details
- Born: Algernon Lee Butler; August 2, 1905 Clinton, North Carolina
- Died: September 5, 1978 (aged 73)
- Education: University of North Carolina School of Law read law

Algernon Lee Butler (August 2, 1905 – September 5, 1978) was a United States district judge of the United States District Court for the Eastern District of North Carolina.

== Education and career ==
Born in Clinton, North Carolina, Butler attended the University of North Carolina School of Law, and read law in 1928 to enter the bar. He entered private practice in Clinton in 1928, and was a member of the North Carolina House of Representatives in 1931, and a county attorney of Sampson County, North Carolina from 1938 to 1951.

== Federal judicial service ==
On July 28, 1959, Butler was nominated by President Dwight D. Eisenhower to a seat on the United States District Court for the Eastern District of North Carolina vacated by Judge Donnell Gilliam. Butler was confirmed by the United States Senate on August 28, 1959, and received his commission on August 31, 1959. He served as Chief Judge from 1961 to 1975, assuming senior status on August 2, 1975, and serving in that capacity until his death on September 5, 1978.

== Sources ==
Party political offices
| Preceded by Bill Fletcher | Republican nominee for North Carolina Superintendent of Public Instruction; 1932 | Succeeded by Calvin C. Zimmerman |
Legal offices
| Preceded by Donnell Gilliam | Judge of the United States District Court for the Eastern District of North Carolina; 1959–1975 | Succeeded by Seat abolished |
| Preceded by Office established | Chief Judge of the United States District Court for the Eastern District of North Carolina; 1961–1975 | Succeeded by John Davis Larkins Jr. |
