= Malcolm Jones Howard =

American judge (1939–2025)

Senior Judge of the United States District Court for the Eastern District of North Carolina
- In office December 31, 2005 – January 12, 2025

Judge of the United States Foreign Intelligence Surveillance Court
- In office May 19, 2005 – January 8, 2012
- Appointed by: John Roberts
- Preceded by: Harold Baker
- Succeeded by: Raymond Dearie

Judge of the United States District Court for the Eastern District of North Carolina
- In office February 26, 1988 – December 31, 2005
- Appointed by: Ronald Reagan
- Preceded by: Seat established by 98 Stat. 333
- Succeeded by: Richard E. Myers II

Personal details
- Born: June 24, 1939 Kinston, North Carolina, U.S.
- Died: January 12, 2025 (aged 85)
- Education: United States Military Academy (BS); Wake Forest University (JD)

Malcolm Jones Howard (June 24, 1939 – January 12, 2025) was a United States district judge of the United States District Court for the Eastern District of North Carolina.

== Background ==
Howard was born in Kinston, North Carolina. He received a Bachelor of Science degree from United States Military Academy at West Point in 1962 and a Juris Doctor from Wake Forest University School of Law in 1970. From 1962 to 1972, he served as a major in the United States Army. He was a legislative counsel for the United States Secretary of the Army, from 1971 to 1972.

Howard died on January 12, 2025, at the age of 85.

== Early career ==
After his military service, he worked as general counsel and marketing manager for Dixon Marketing, Inc. in Kinston in 1972. He was an assistant United States attorney of the Eastern District of North Carolina from 1973 to 1974. In 1974, he was a deputy special counsel of the Executive Office of the President of the United States. He was in private practice in Greenville, North Carolina from 1975 to 1988, and was a civilian aide to the United States Secretary of the Army for North Carolina, from 1986 to 1988.

== Federal judicial service ==
Howard was nominated by President Ronald Reagan on September 10, 1987, to the United States District Court for the Eastern District of North Carolina, to a new seat authorized by 98 Stat. 333. He was confirmed by the United States Senate on February 25, 1988, and received commission on February 26, 1988. He assumed senior status on December 31, 2005. Howard served as a Judge of the United States Foreign Intelligence Surveillance Court from 2005 to 2012.

=== Notable cases ===
In a March 28, 2019 decision, Howard ruled that Title IX applies to dress codes and struck down a public charter school's policy that required girls to wear skirts or dresses. Howard wrote: "Yes, the boys at the School must conform to a uniform policy as well. But plaintiffs in this case have shown that the girls are subject to a specific clothing requirement that renders them unable to play as freely during recess, requires them to sit in an uncomfortable manner in the classroom, causes them to be overly focused on how they are sitting, distracts them from learning, and subjects them to cold temperatures on their legs and/or uncomfortable layers of leggings under their knee-length skirts in order to stay warm, especially moving out-side between classrooms at the School. Defendants have offered no evidence of any comparable burden on boys." Howard's ruling was reversed by the Fourth Circuit Court of Appeals in August 2021. The Fourth Circuit Court of Appeals granted summary judgment to Plaintiffs on the equal protection claim, but to Defendants on the Title IX claim, holding that Title IX did not reach school dress codes.

Legal offices
Preceded by Seat established by 98 Stat. 333	Judge of the United States District Court for the Eastern District of North Carolina; 1988–2005	Succeeded by Richard E. Myers II
Preceded by Harold Baker	Judge of the United States Foreign Intelligence Surveillance Court; 2005–2012	Succeeded by Raymond Dearie
