= Donnell Gilliam =

American judge

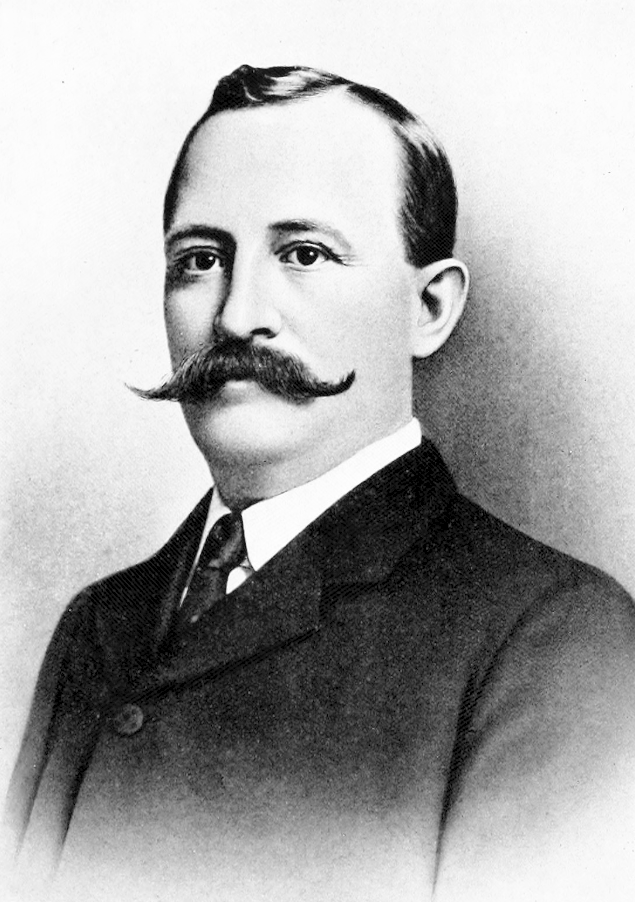

Senior Judge of the United States District Court for the Eastern District of North Carolina
- In office March 16, 1959 – March 6, 1960

Judge of the United States District Court for the Eastern District of North Carolina
- In office May 18, 1945 – March 16, 1959
- Appointed by: Harry S. Truman
- Preceded by: Isaac Melson Meekins
- Succeeded by: Algernon Lee Butler

Personal details
- Born: March 12, 1889 Tarboro, North Carolina
- Died: March 6, 1960 (aged 70) Tarboro, North Carolina
- Education: University of North Carolina at Chapel Hill (B.A.); University of North Carolina School of Law (LL.B.)

Donnell Gilliam (March 12, 1889 – March 6, 1960) was a United States district judge of the United States District Court for the Eastern District of North Carolina.

== Education and career ==
Donnell Gilliam was born in Tarboro, North Carolina on March 12, 1889. He received a Bachelor of Arts degree from the University of North Carolina at Chapel Hill in 1909 and a Bachelor of Laws from the University of North Carolina School of Law in 1910. He was in private practice in Tarboro from 1923 to 1945, also serving as a North Carolina district solicitor from 1923 to 1945.

== Federal judicial service ==
On May 3, 1945, Gilliam was nominated by President Harry S. Truman to a seat on the United States District Court for the Eastern District of North Carolina vacated by Judge Isaac Melson Meekins. Gilliam was confirmed by the United States Senate on May 15, 1945, and received his commission on May 18, 1945. He assumed senior status on March 16, 1959, serving in that capacity until his death on March 6, 1960, in Tarboro.

== Sources ==
Legal offices
Preceded by Isaac Melson Meekins	Judge of the United States District Court for the Eastern District of North Carolina; 1945–1959	Succeeded by Algernon Lee Butler
