= List of law clerks for the first seat of the Supreme Court of the United States =

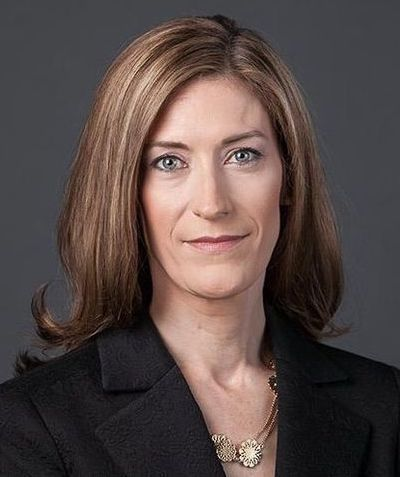
Rachel Brand, who was United States Associate Attorney General, clerked for Justice Anthony Kennedy during the 2002–03 term.

Law clerks have assisted the justices of the United States Supreme Court in various capacities since the first one was hired by Justice Horace Gray in 1882. Each justice is permitted to have between three and four law clerks per Court term. Most persons serving in this capacity are recent law school graduates (and typically graduated at the top of their class). Among their many functions, clerks do legal research that assists justices in deciding what cases to accept and what questions to ask during oral arguments, prepare memoranda, and draft orders and opinions. After retiring from the Court, a justice may continue to employ a law clerk, who may be assigned to provide additional assistance to an active justice or may assist the retired justice when sitting by designation with a lower court.

== Table of law clerks ==
The following is a table of law clerks serving the associate justice holding first seat of the Supreme Court (the Court's first associate justice seat by the order of precedence of the inaugural associate justices (Note: Their place in the order of precedence was based upon the seniority of their commission from President George Washington following their confirmation by the U.S. Senate.)), which was established on September 24, 1789 by the 1st Congress through the Judiciary Act of 1789 (1 Stat. 73). This seat is currently occupied by Justice Brett Kavanaugh.

Seat 1 associate justices and law clerks

Samuel Blatchford

April 3, 1882 –
July 7, 1893

Clerk	Started	Finished	School (year)	Previous clerkship

Edward Douglass White

March 12, 1894 –
December 18, 1910^{CJ}

Clerk	Started	Finished	School (year)	Previous clerkship

Willis Van Devanter

January 3, 1911 –
June 2, 1937

Clerk	Started	Finished	School (year)	Previous clerkship
Richard E. Repath	1910	1911		Devanter (8th Cir.)
Frederick H. Barclay	1911	1913	Columbian-GW (1901)	
Mahlon D. Kiefer	1914	1922	National (LLB 1907, LLM 1909)	
George Howland Chase III	1923	1924	Harvard (1923)	
James W. Yokum	1923	1925	Georgetown (did not graduate)	
J. Arthur Mattson	1924	1928	Georgetown (1924)	
John T. McHale	1926	1937	Georgetown (c. 1914, did not graduate)	

Hugo Black

August 19, 1937 –
September 17, 1971

Clerk	Started	Finished	School (year)	Previous clerkship
Jerome A. ("Buddy") Cooper	1937	1940	Harvard (1936)	
Chris J. Dixie	1937	1938	Texas (1936)	
Marx Leva	1940	1941	Harvard (1940)	
Maxwell ("Max") Isenbergh	1941	1942	Harvard (1938–39)	
John Paul Frank	1942	1943	Wisconsin (LLB 1940) / Yale (SJD 1947)	none
Charles F. Luce	1943	1944	Yale (1942)	none
Sidney M. Davis	1944	1945	Chicago (1943)	J. Frank (2d Cir.)
David Haber	1945	1946	Yale (1944)	C.E. Clark (2d Cir.)
Louis F. Oberdorfer	1946	1947	Yale (1946)	none
William Joslin	1947	1948	Columbia (1947)	none
Truman McGill Hobbs	1948	1949	Yale (1948)	none
Frank M. Wozencraft	1949	1950	Yale (1949)	none
George M. Treister	1950	1951	Yale (1949)	P. Gibson (Cal.)
Luther L. Hill Jr.	1950	1951	Harvard (1950)	none
Neal P. Rutledge	1951	1952	Yale (1950)	Fahy (D.C. Cir.)
Carroll Samuel ("Sam") Daniels	1951	1952	Columbia (1951)	
Huey Blair Howerton Jr.	1951	1952	Mississippi (1946)	
Melford O. Cleveland	1952	1953	Yale Law School (LLM, 1951)	
Charles A. Reich	1953	1954	Yale (1952)	none
David J. Vann	1953	1954	Alabama (1951)	
Daniel Meador	1954	1955	Harvard (1954)	
James W. H. ("Bill") Stewart	1954	1955	Washington and Lee University (LLB 1952) Harvard (LLM 1953)	
J. Vernon Patrick	1955	1956	Harvard (1955)	
Harold Anson Ward, III	1955	1956	Chicago (1955)	
George Clemon Freeman Jr.	1956	1957	Yale (1956)	
Robert A. Girard	1956	1957	Harvard (1956)	
David M. Clark	1957	1959	NYU (1957)	
Guido Calabresi	1958	1959	Yale (1958)	none
Robert T. Basseches	1958	1959	Yale (1958)	Bazelon (D.C. Cir)
Nicholas Johnson	1959	1960	Texas (1956)	John R. Brown (5th Cir.)
John K. McNulty	1959	1960	Yale (1959)	none
Lawrence G. Wallace	1960	1961	Columbia (1959)	none
George Lawton Saunders Jr.	1960	1962	Chicago (1959)	Rives (5th Cir.)
Floyd Fulton Feeney	1961	1962	NYU (1960)	none
Arthur Ellsworth Dick ("Dick") Howard	1962	1964	Virginia (1961)	none
Clay C. Long	1962	1963	Harvard (1962)	none
John G. Kester	1963	1965	Harvard (1963)	none
James Little North	1964	1965	Virginia (1964)	none
Drayton Nabers Jr.	1965	1966	Yale (1965)	none
John W. Vardaman	1965	1966	Harvard (1965)	none
Margaret J. Corcoran	1966	1967	Harvard (1965)	
Stephen Susman	1966	1967	Texas (1965)	John R. Brown (5th Cir.)
Joseph Hubbard Price	1967	1968	Harvard (1964)	none
Stephen Schulhofer	1967	1969	Harvard (1967)	none
Walter Dellinger	1968	1969	Yale (1966)	none
Kenneth C. Bass, III	1969	1970	Yale (1969)	none
James Gustave Speth	1969	1970	Yale (1969)	none
George Marshall Moriarty (hired by Burger, shared with White, Stewart, Burger)	1969	1970	Harvard (1968)	Aldrich (1st Cir.)
John M. Harmon	1970	1971	Duke (1969)	G. Bell (5th Cir.)
Robert B. McKaw	1970	1971	Virginia (1970)	
Robert W. ("Bob") Spearman	1970	1971	Yale (1970)	
Lawrence A. ("Larry") Hammond	1971	September 17, 1971	Texas (1970)	McGowan (D.C. Cir.)
Covert E. Parnell, III	1971	September 17, 1971	Harvard (1970)	Van Dusen (3d Cir.)

Lewis F. Powell Jr.

January 7, 1972 –
June 26, 1987

Clerk	Started	Finished	School (year)	Previous clerkship
Hamilton Philips Fox, III	January 7, 1972	July 1972	Yale (1970)	Coffin (1st Cir.)
Covert E. Parnell, III	January 7, 1972	July 1972	Harvard (1970)	Black
J. Harvie Wilkinson III	January 7, 1972	1973	Virginia (1972)	none
Lawrence A. ("Larry") Hammond	January 7, 1972	1973	Texas (1970)	Black / McGowan (D.C. Cir.)
William C. Kelly Jr.	1972	1973	Yale (1971)	Coffin (1st Cir.)
John J. Buckley Jr.	1973	1974	Chicago (1972)	Wisdom (5th Cir.)
John C. Jeffries Jr.	1973	1974	Virginia (1973)	none
Jack B. Owens	1973	1974	Stanford (1970)	Hamley (9th Cir.)
David R. Boyd	1974	1975	Virginia (1973)	McGowan (D.C. Cir.)
Julia Penny Clark	1974	1975	Texas (1973)	Craven (4th Cir.)
Joel I. Klein	1974	1975	Harvard (1971)	Bazelon (D.C. Cir.)
Ronald G. Carr	1974	1975	Chicago (1973)	Bazelon (D.C. Cir)
Gregory K. Palm	1975	1976	Harvard (1974)	Friendly (2d Cir.)
Carl R. Schenker Jr.	1975	1976	Stanford (1974)	Hufstedler (9th Cir.)
Christina B. Whitman	1975	1976	Michigan (1974)	Leventhal (D.C. Cir.)
J. Phillip Jordan	1975	1976	Virginia (1974)	Craven (4th Cir.)
Tyler A. Baker, III	1976	1977	Stanford (1975)	Renfrew (N.D. Cal.)
David A. Martin	1976	1977	Yale (1975)	J. S. Wright (D.C. Cir.)
Charles C. Ames	1976	1977	Virginia (1975)	L. Campbell (1st Cir.)
Eugene Joseph Comey	1976	1977	Chicago (1975)	McGowan (D.C. Cir)
James D. Alt	1977	1978	Chicago (1976)	L. Morgan (5th Cir.)
Nancy J. Bregstein (Gordon)	1977	1978	Penn (1976)	? (2d Cir.)
Robert D. Comfort	1977	1978	Harvard (1976)	Hunter (3d Cir.)
Samuel Estreicher	1977	1978	Columbia (1975)	Leventhal (D.C. Cir.)
Eric G. Andersen	1978	1979	BYU (1977)	J. C. Wallace (9th Cir.)
J. Bruce Boisture	1978	1979	Yale (1977)	Gurfein (2d Cir.)
Paul B. Stephan, III	1978	1979	Virginia (1977)	L. Campbell (1st Cir.)
David L. Westin	1978	1979	Michigan (1977)	Lumbard (2d Cir.)
Jonathan B. Sallet	1979	1980	Virginia (1978)	Tamm (D.C. Cir.)
David O. Stewart	1979	1980	Yale (1978)	J. S. Wright (D.C. Cir.) / Bazelon (D.C. Cir.)
Gregory Evers May	1979	1980	Harvard (1978)	Butzner (4th Cir.)
Mary Ellen ("Ellen") Richey	1979	1980	Stanford (1978)	Renfrew (N.D. Cal.)
J. Peter Byrne	1980	1981	Virginia (1979)	Coffin (1st Cir.)
Paul W. Cane Jr.	1980	1981	Berkeley (1979)	McGowan (D.C. Cir.)
R. Gregory Morgan	1980	1981	Michigan (1979)	Lumbard (2d Cir.)
Paul M. Smith	1980	1981	Yale (1979)	Oakes (2d Cir.)
Mary E. Becker	1981	1982	Chicago (1980)	Mikva (D.C. Cir.)
Richard H. Fallon Jr.	1981	1982	Yale (1980)	J. S. Wright (D.C. Cir.)
David F. Levi	1981	1982	Stanford (1980)	Duniway (9th Cir.)
John Shepard Wiley Jr.	1981	1982	Berkeley (1980)	Coffin (1st Cir.)
James O. Browning	1982	1983	Virginia (1981)	Seitz (3d Cir.)
D. Rives Kistler	1982	1983	Georgetown (1981)	C. Clark (5th Cir.)
Mark E. Newell	1982	1983	Harvard (1981)	Wilkey (D.C. Cir.)
Michael F. Sturley	1982	1983	Yale (1981)	Kearse (2d Cir.)
David A. Charny	1983	1984	Harvard (1982)	Wilkey (D.C. Cir.)
Robert M. Couch	1983	1984	Washington & Lee (1982)	Wisdom (5th Cir.)
Joseph E. Neuhaus	1983	1984	Columbia (1982)	McGowan (D.C. Cir.)
Cammie R. Robinson (Hauptfuhrer)	1983	1984	Virginia (1982)	Seitz (3d Cir.)
A. Lee Bentley III	1984	1985	Virginia (1983)	Haynsworth (4th Cir.)
Annmarie Levins	1984	1985	Maine (1983)	Oakes (2d Cir.)
Daniel R. Ortiz	1984	1985	Yale (1983)	S. Breyer (1st Cir.)
Lynda Guild Simpson	1984	1985	Chicago (1982)	Kearse (2d Cir.)
Rory Knox Little (shared with Brennan, Stewart, Stevens)	1984	1985	Yale (1982)	Oberdorfer (D.D.C.)
C. Cabell Chinnis Jr.	1985	1986	Yale (1984)	Wisdom (5th Cir.)
Anne M. Coughlin	1985	1986	NYU (1984)	Newman (2d Cir.)
Michael W. Mosman	1985	1986	BYU (1984)	Wilkey (D.C. Cir.)
William J. Stuntz	1985	1986	Virginia (1984)	L. Pollak (E.D. Pa.)
Robert Allen Long Jr.	1986	1987	Yale (1985)	Wisdom (5th Cir.)
Leslie S. Gielow (Jacobs)	1986	1987	Michigan (1985)	Oberdorfer (D.D.C.)
Andrew D. Leipold	1986	1987	Virginia (1985)	Mikva (D.C. Cir.)
Ronald J. Mann	1986	1987	Texas (1985)	Sneed (9th Cir.)
Robert W. Werner (shared with Kennedy)	1987	1988	NYU (1986)	Weinfeld (S.D.N.Y.)
R. Hewitt Pate, III	1988	1989	Virginia (1987)	Wilkinson (4th Cir.)
Michael N. Levy	1989	1990	Harvard (1988)	Oberdorfer (D.D.C.)
George C. Freeman, III	1990	1991	Yale (1989)	R. Arnold (8th Cir.)
Jeffrey S. Sutton (shared with Scalia)	1991	1992	Ohio State (1990)	Meskill (2d Cir.)
Rebecca A. Womeldorf (shared with Kennedy)	1992	1993	Washington & Lee (1991)	Merhige (E.D. Va.)
Deanne E. Maynard (shared with Stevens)	1993	1994	Harvard (1991)	S. Harris (D.D.C.)
James J. Benjamin (shared with Stevens)	1994	1995	Virginia (1990)	J. F. Motz (D. Md.)
Mark David Harris (shared with Stevens)	1995	1996	Harvard (1992)	Flaum (7th Cir.)

Anthony Kennedy

February 18, 1988 –
July 31, 2018

Clerk	Started	Finished	School (year)	Previous clerkship
Daniel C. Chung	February 18, 1988	July 1988	Harvard (1987)	Kennedy (9th Cir.)
Miguel A. Estrada	February 18, 1988	July 1988	Harvard (1986)	Kearse (2d Cir.)
Peter D. Keisler	February 18, 1988	July 1988	Yale (1985)	Bork (D.C. Cir.)
E. Lawrence Vincent	February 18, 1988	July 1988	Texas (1987)	Kennedy (9th Cir.)
Robert W. Werner (shared with Powell)	February 18, 1988	July 1988	NYU (1986)	Weinfeld (S.D.N.Y.)
Elizabeth D. Collery (Moss) (served first half only, replaced by Litman)	1988	1989	Harvard (1986)	D. Ginsburg (D.C. Cir.)
Miguel A. Estrada (served first half only, replaced by Cordray)	1988	1989	Harvard (1986)	Kennedy / Kearse (2d Cir.)
Thomas G. Hungar	1988	1989	Yale (1987)	Kozinski (9th Cir.)
Peter D. Keisler (served first half only, replaced by Cappuccio)	1988	1989	Yale (1985)	Kennedy / Bork (D.C. Cir.)
Paul T. Cappuccio (served second half only)	1988	1989	Harvard (1986)	Scalia / Kozinski (9th Cir.)
Richard A. Cordray (served second half only)	1988	1989	Chicago (1986)	B. White / Bork (D.C. Cir.)
Harry P. Litman (served second half only)	1988	1989	Berkeley (1986)	T. Marshall / Mikva (D.C. Cir.)
Jeanne M. Hauch	1989	1990	Yale (1988)	R. Winter (2d Cir.)
Gregory E. Maggs	1989	1990	Harvard (1988)	Sneed (9th Cir.)
Michael Thomas Mollerus	1989	1990	Harvard (1988)	J.E. Smith (5th Cir.)
R. Hewitt Pate, III	1989	1990	Virginia (1987)	Powell / Wilkinson (4th Cir.)
J. Randy Beck	1990	1991	SMU (1988)	P. Higginbotham (5th Cir.)
Jack L. Goldsmith	1990	1991	Yale (1989)	Wilkinson (4th Cir.)
David G. Litt	1990	1991	Chicago (1988)	Goodwin (9th Cir.)
K. John Shaffer	1990	1991	Berkeley (1989)	Kozinski (9th Cir.)
David L. Anderson	1991	1992	Stanford (1990)	J. C. Wallace (9th Cir.)
Ashutosh Bhagwat	1991	1992	Chicago (1990)	Posner (7th Cir.)
Michael C. Dorf	1991	1992	Harvard (1990)	Reinhardt (9th Cir.)
Jacqueline G. Cooper	1991	1992	Chicago (1990)	Kozinski (9th Cir.)
John E. Barry (shared with Burger)	1991	1992	Columbia (1985)	L. Campbell (1st Cir.)
Bradford A. Berenson	1992	1993	Harvard (1991)	Silberman (D.C. Cir.)
Adam H. Charnes	1992	1993	Harvard (1991)	Wilkinson (4th Cir.)
Matthew H. Lembke	1992	1993	Virginia (1991)	Wilkinson (4th Cir.)
Christopher R. J. Pace	1992	1993	Penn (1990)	Kozinski (9th Cir.)
Rebecca A. Womeldorf (shared with Powell)	1992	1993	Washington & Lee (1991)	Merhige (E.D. Va.)
Miles F. Ehrlich	1993	1994	Stanford (1992)	W. Norris (9th Cir.)
Gary Feinerman	1993	1994	Stanford (1991)	Flaum (7th Cir.)
Nathan A. Forrester	1993	1994	Chicago (1992)	Wilkinson (4th Cir.)
Brett Kavanaugh	1993	1994	Yale (1990)	Kozinski (9th Cir.) / Stapleton (3d Cir.)
Neil Gorsuch (shared with White)	1993	1994	Harvard (1991)	Sentelle (D.C. Cir.)
Susan M. Davies	1994	1995	Chicago (1991)	S. Breyer (1st Cir.)
Michael J. Hirshland	1994	1995	Virginia (1993)	Luttig (4th Cir.)
Cheryl A. Krause (Zemelman)	1994	1995	Stanford (1993)	Kozinski (9th Cir.)
Daniel Meron	1994	1995	Harvard (1992)	Silberman (D.C. Cir.)
Nancy L. Combs	1995	1996	Berkeley (1994)	O'Scannlain (9th Cir.)
Ward Farnsworth	1995	1996	Chicago (1994)	Posner (7th Cir.)
Stephen B. Kinnaird	1995	1996	Yale (1994)	J. M. Walker (2d Cir.)
Kelly M. Klaus	1995	1996	Stanford (1992)	Rymer (9th Cir.) / Orrick (N.D. Cal.)
John P. Elwood	1996	1997	Yale (1993)	Mahoney (2d Cir.)
F. Allen Ferrell	1996	1997	Harvard (1995)	Silberman (D.C. Cir.)
Renee Lettow (Lerner)	1996	1997	Yale (1995)	S. Williams (D.C. Cir.)
Anthony J. Vlatas	1996	1997	Columbia (1994)	Kozinski (9th Cir.) / Leisure (S.D.N.Y.)
Stephanos Bibas	1997	1998	Yale (1994)	P. Higginbotham (5th Cir.)
Raymond Kethledge	1997	1998	Michigan (1993)	Guy (6th Cir.)
Harry P. Susman	1997	1998	Texas (1996)	Kozinski (9th Cir.)
Christopher S. Yoo	1997	1998	Northwestern (1995)	Randolph (D.C. Cir.)
Lisa Grow Sun	1998	1999	Harvard (1997)	Luttig (4th Cir.)
Howard C. Nielson Jr.	1998	1999	Chicago (1997)	Luttig (4th Cir.)
Edward S. Pallesen	1998	1999	Harvard (1997)	Leval (2d Cir.)
John Christopher Rozendaal	1998	1999	Texas (1997)	D. Ginsburg (D.C. Cir.)
James F. Bennett	1999	2000	Vanderbilt (1995)	Edmondson (11th Cir.)
William A. Burck	1999	2000	Yale (1998)	Kozinski (9th Cir.)
Stephen M. Nickelsburg	1999	2000	Virginia (1998)	Wilkinson (4th Cir.)
Michael Y. Scudder	1999	2000	Northwestern (1998)	Niemeyer (4th Cir.)
Grant M. Dixton	2000	2001	Harvard (1999)	Luttig (4th Cir.)
Brett C. Gerry	2000	2001	Yale (1999)	Silberman (D.C. Cir.)
Kevin J. Miller	2000	2001	Chicago (1999)	J.E. Smith (5th Cir.)
Eugene M. Paige	2000	2001	Harvard (1998)	Kozinski (9th Cir.)
Steven Engel	2001	2002	Yale (2000)	Kozinski (9th Cir.)
John C. Neiman	2001	2002	Harvard (2000)	Niemeyer (4th Cir.)
Nicholas Quinn Rosenkranz	2001	2002	Yale (1999)	Easterbrook (7th Cir.)
Alexander J. Willscher	2001	2002	Chicago (2000)	Wilkinson (4th Cir.)
Rachel L. Brand	2002	2003	Harvard (1998)	Fried (Mass.)
Brian R. Matsui	2002	2003	Stanford (1999)	Rymer (9th Cir.) / Levi (E.D. Cal.)
Igor V. Timofeyev	2002	2003	Yale (2001)	Kozinski (9th Cir.)
Michael F. Williams	2002	2003	Georgetown (2001)	D. Ginsburg (D.C. Cir.)
Bertrand-Marc ("Marc") Allen	2003	2004	Yale (2002)	Luttig (4th Cir.)
Edward C. Dawson	2003	2004	Texas (2002)	Carnes (11th Cir.)
Orin Kerr	2003	2004	Harvard (1997)	Garth (3d Cir.)
Chi T. Kwok	2003	2004	Yale (2002)	Kozinski (9th Cir.)
Andrew C. Baak	2004	2005	Chicago (2003)	Posner (7th Cir.)
Kathryn Rose Haun	2004	2005	Stanford (2000)	Kozinski (9th Cir.)
Michael E. Scoville	2004	2005	Harvard (2003)	Luttig (4th Cir.)
Matthew C. Stephenson	2004	2005	Harvard (2003)	Williams (D.C. Cir.)
David M. Cooper	2005	2006	Stanford (2004)	Garland (D.C. Cir.)
Randy J. Kozel	2005	2006	Harvard (2004)	Kozinski (9th Cir.)
Jeffrey A. Pojanowski	2005	2006	Harvard (2004)	Roberts (D.C. Cir.)
Zachary S. Price	2005	2006	Harvard (2003)	Tatel (D.C. Cir.) / Blake (D. Md.)
David W. Foster	2006	2007	Harvard (2005)	Kozinski (9th Cir.)
Lisa Marshall (Manheim)	2006	2007	Yale (2005)	Leval (2d Cir.)
Eric E. Murphy	2006	2007	Chicago (2005)	Wilkinson (4th Cir.)
Mark R. Yohalem	2006	2007	Harvard (2005)	Rymer (9th Cir.)
Michael Chu	2007	2008	Harvard (2006)	D. Ginsburg (D.C. Cir.)
Stephen J. Cowen	2007	2008	Chicago (2006)	D. Ginsburg (D.C. Cir.)
Andrianna ("Annie") Kastanek	2007	2008	Northwestern (2005)	Ripple (7th Cir.)
C.J. Mahoney	2007	2008	Yale (2006)	Kozinski (9th Cir.)
Heidi Bond (shared with O'Connor)	2007	2008	Michigan (2006)	Kozinski (9th Cir.)
Ashley C. Keller	2008	2009	Chicago (2007)	Posner (7th Cir.)
Travis D. Lenkner (Delaney)	2008	2009	Kansas (2005)	Kavanaugh (D.C. Cir.)
Steven M. Shepard	2008	2009	Yale (2007)	Kozinski (9th Cir.)
Christopher J. Walker	2008	2009	Stanford (2006)	Kozinski (9th Cir.)
Daniel Epps	2009	2010	Harvard (2008)	Wilkinson (4th Cir.)
Allon Shmuel Itzhak Kedem	2009	2010	Yale (2005)	Leval (2d Cir.) / Kravitz (D. Conn.)
Scott A. Keller	2009	2010	Texas (2007)	Kozinski (9th Cir.)
Misha Tseytlin	2009	2010	Georgetown (2006)	Kozinski (9th Cir.) / J. Brown (D.C. Cir.)
Joshua A. Deahl (shared with O'Connor)	2009	2010	Michigan (2006)	Benavides (5th Cir.)
Steven J. Horowitz	2010	2011	Harvard (2009)	Posner (7th Cir.)
Robert E. Johnson	2010	2011	Harvard (2009)	Kozinski (9th Cir.)
Richard M. Re	2010	2011	Yale (2008)	Kavanaugh (D.C. Cir.)
James Y. Stern	2010	2011	Virginia (2009)	Wilkinson (4th Cir.)
Samuel T. C. ("Sam") Erman (shared with Stevens)	2010	2011	Michigan (2007)	Garland (D.C. Cir.)
Ishan K. Bhabha	2011	2012	Harvard (2009)	Garland (D.C. Cir.)
Leah Litman	2011	2012	Michigan (2010)	Sutton (6th Cir.)
Eric Scott Nguyen	2011	2012	Harvard (2009)	Kozinski (9th Cir.)
Justin R. Walker	2011	2012	Harvard (2009)	Kavanaugh (D.C. Cir.)
Dina B. Mishra (shared with Stevens)	2011	2012	Yale (2009)	Boudin (1st Cir.)
David W. Denton Jr.	2012	2013	Harvard (2011)	Wilkinson (4th Cir.)
Joshua ("Josh") Patashnik	2012	2013	Stanford (2011)	Sutton (6th Cir.)
Mark David Taticchi	2012	2013	GW (2010)	Ikuta (9th Cir.)
Lauren S. Willard	2012	2013	Virginia (2011)	Kozinski (9th Cir.)
Gregory Jacob Dubinsky	2013	2014	Yale (2011)	Kavanaugh (D.C. Cir.) / Feinerman (N.D. Ill.)
Matthew X. Etchemendy	2013	2014	Stanford (2012)	Garland (D.C. Cir.)
Katherine Moran Meeks	2013	2014	Penn (2012)	Kozinski (9th Cir.)
Michael F. Murray	2013	2014	Yale (2009)	O'Scannlain (9th Cir.)
Aaron Zelinsky (shared with Stevens)	2013	2014	Yale (2010)	Griffith (D.C. Cir.)
Andrew J.M. Bentz	2014	2015	Virginia (2012)	Kozinski (9th Cir.)
James W. Crooks	2014	2015	Columbia (2013)	Kozinski (9th Cir.)
Joshua Matz	2014	2015	Harvard (2012)	Reinhardt (9th Cir.) / Oetken (S.D.N.Y.)
Caroline S. Van Zile	2014	2015	Yale (2012)	Kavanaugh (D.C. Cir.) / Boasberg (D.D.C.)
Travis Crum (shared with Stevens)	2014	2015	Yale (2011)	Tatel (D.C. Cir.) / Thompson (M.D. Ala.)
Elana Nightingale Dawson	2015	2016	Northwestern (2011)	Kethledge (6th Cir.) / Feinerman (N.D. Ill.)
Samir Deger-sen	2015	2016	Yale (2013)	Susan Oki Mollway (D. Haw.) / Kozinski (9th Cir.)
Andrew Gareth Irving Kilberg	2015	2016	Virginia (2014)	Wilkinson (4th Cir.)
C. Harker Rhodes, IV	2015	2016	Stanford (2012)	Katzmann (2d Cir.) / Zobel (D. Mass.)
Gillian S. Grossman (shared with Stevens)	2015	2016	Harvard (2014)	Kavanaugh (D.C. Cir.)
Alex Jordan Harris	2016	2017	Harvard (2015)	Gorsuch (10th Cir.)
William C. Purdue	2016	2017	Yale (2011)	Katzmann (2d Cir.) / Rakoff (S.D.N.Y.)
John J. Snidow	2016	2017	Yale (2014)	Kethledge (6th Cir.) / Thapar (E.D. Ky.)
Thomas Gregory Sprankling	2016	2017	Columbia (2012)	Kozinski (9th Cir.)
Teresa A. Reed (Dippo) (shared with Stevens)	2016	2017	Stanford (2015)	Millett (D.C. Cir.)
Nicholas ("Nick") Harper (hired by Scalia)	2017	2018	Chicago (2015)	Kavanaugh (D.C. Cir.)
Geoffrey C. Shaw	2017	2018	Yale (2016)	Reinhardt (9th Cir.)
Matthew Steven Gregory	2017	2018	Michigan (2014)	Kethledge (6th Cir.)
Krista J. Perry	2017	2018	Chicago (2016)	W. Pryor (11th Cir.)
Donald L.R. Goodson (shared with Stevens)	2017	2018	NYU (2013)	Katzmann (2d Cir.) / Nathan (S.D.N.Y.)
Alexander Kazam (shared with Gorsuch)	2018	2018	Yale (2016)	Kethledge (6th Cir.) / Sullivan (S.D.N.Y.)
Samuel Conrad Scott (shared with Ginsburg)	2018	2018	Yale (2015)	Watford (9th Cir.) / Garaufis (E.D.N.Y.)
Aimee W. Brown (shared with Alito)	2018	2019	Chicago (2014)	Griffith (D.C. Cir.)
Clayton Kozinski (shared with Gorsuch)	2019	2020	Yale (2017)	Kavanaugh (D.C. Cir.)
Ben Wallace (shared with Kavanaugh)	2020	2021	Yale (2016)	Kethledge (6th Cir.) / Srinivasan (D.C. Cir.)
Elizabeth Nielson (shared with Barrett)	2021	2022	Chicago (2019)	Lee (Utah) / Sutton (6th Cir.)
James Durling (shared with Kavanaugh)	2022	2023	Yale (2018)	Kethledge (6th Cir.) / Thapar (6th Cir.)
A.J. Jeffries (shared with Kavanaugh)	2023	2024	Stanford (2020)	Bush (6th Cir.) / J.R. Walker (D.C. Cir.)
Connie Wang (shared with Kavanaugh)	2024	2025	Stanford (2020)	Watford (9th Cir.) / Millett (D.C. Cir.)

Brett Kavanaugh

October 6, 2018 –
Incumbent

Clerk	Started	Finished	School (year)	Previous clerkship
Shannon M. Grammel	October 6, 2018	2019	Stanford (2017)	Wilkinson (4th Cir.)
Kimberly J. Jackson	October 6, 2018	2019	Yale (2017)	Friedrich (D.D.C.) / Kavanaugh (D.C. Cir.)
Megan Marie Lacy	October 6, 2018	2019	Virginia (2010)	Fitzwater (N.D. Tex.) / O'Scannlain (9th Cir.)
Sara Shaw Nommensen	October 6, 2018	2019	Harvard (2016)	Sullivan (S.D.N.Y.) / Silberman (D.C. Cir.)
Audrey A. Beck	2019	2020	Notre Dame (2017)	Larsen (6th Cir.) / Sutton (6th Cir.)
Sophia Chua-Rubenfeld	2019	2020	Yale (2018)	Grant (11th Cir.)
Trenton J. Van Oss	2019	2020	Harvard (2017)	Grant (11th Cir.)
James Y. Xi	2019	2020	Stanford (2017)	Sutton (6th Cir.)
Megan McGlynn	2020	2021	Yale (2017)	W. Pryor (11th Cir.) / Friedrich (D.D.C.)
Zoe A. Jacoby	2020	2021	Yale (2019)	Barrett (7th Cir.)
Tyler Kathryn Infinger	2020	2021	NYU (2016)	Rao (D.C. Cir.)
Harry S. Graver	2020	2021	Harvard (2019)	Wilkinson (4th Cir.)
Ben Wallace (shared with Kennedy)	2020	2021	Yale (2016)	Kethledge (6th Cir.) / Srinivasan (D.C. Cir.)
Alexa R. Baltes	2021	2022	Notre Dame (2017)	Gruender (8th Cir.) / Barrett (7th Cir.)
Athanasia O. ("Athie") Livas	2021	2022	Yale (2019)	Thapar (6th Cir.) / Friedrich (D.D.C.)
Jenna H. Pavelec	2021	2022	Yale (2017)	Kethledge (6th Cir.) / Thapar (6th Cir.)
Sarah E. Welch	2021	2022	Chicago (2019)	Sutton (6th Cir.) / W. Pryor (11th Cir.)
Emily M. Hall	2022	2023	Yale (2021)	Thapar (6th Cir.)
Isabel Marin	2022	2023	Harvard (2020)	Collins (9th Cir.) / Millett (D.C. Cir.)
Cameron J. E. Pritchett	2022	2023	Harvard (2018)	Edwards (D.C. Cir.) / Gallagher (D. Md.)
David S. W. Steinbach	2022	2023	Stanford (2019)	Srinivasan (D.C. Cir.) / Boasberg (D.D.C.)
James Durling (shared with Kennedy)	2022	2023	Yale (2018)	Kethledge (6th Cir.) / Thapar (6th Cir.)
Claire Rossell Cahill	2023	2024	Georgetown (2019)	Ambro (3d Cir.) / Grant (11th Cir.) / McFadden (D.D.C.)
Thomas E. Hopson	2023	2024	Yale (2020)	Katsas (D.C. Cir.) / Friedrich (D.D.C.)
Nicholaus C. Mills	2023	2024	Cornell (2019)	Kovner (E.D.N.Y.) / Willett (5th Cir.)
Avery C. Rasmussen	2023	2024	Virginia (2021)	Friedrich (D.D.C.) / Wilkinson (4th Cir.)
A.J. Jeffries (shared with Kennedy)	2023	2024	Stanford (2020)	Bush (6th Cir.) / J.R. Walker (D.C. Cir.)
Zachary J. Lustbader	2024	2025	Yale (2021)	Park (2d Cir.) / Friedrich (D.D.C.)
Erin Brown	2024	2025	Virginia (2021)	Grant (11th Cir.) / Nichols (D.D.C.)
Seanhenry VanDyke	2024	2025	Harvard (2021)	Oldham (5th Cir.) / Katsas (D.C. Cir.)
Patrick Reidy	2024	2025	Yale (2021)	Hardiman (3d Cir.)
Connie Wang (shared with Kennedy)	2024	2025	Stanford (2020)	Watford (9th Cir.) / Millett (D.C. Cir.)
Catherine Cole	2025	2026	Harvard (2022)	Pryor (11th Cir.) / Friedrich (D.D.C.)
Caitlin (Fennelly) Ferguson	2025	2026	Chicago (2024)	Thapar (6th Cir.)
Claire Hungar	2025	2026	Yale (2023)	Thapar (6th Cir.) / Friedrich (D.D.C.)
Sean Sandoloski	2025	2026	Yale (2011)	Colloton (8th Cir.)
Alan Chen	2026		Yale (2023)	Grant (11th Cir.) / Kovner (E.D.N.Y.)
Richard Dunn	2026		Harvard (2024)	Thapar (6th Cir.) / Katsas (D.C. Cir.)
Julia Grant	2026		Virginia (2023)	Wilkinson (4th Cir.) / McFadden (D.D.C.)
Madeline Prebil	2026		Chicago (2021)	Gallagher (D. Md.) / Heytens (4th Cir.)
Spencer Furey	2027		Stanford (2024)	Grant (11th Cir.) / Sullivan (2d Cir.)
Olivia Lyons	2027		Notre Dame (2025)	Richardson (4th Cir.) / Beaton (W.D. Ky.)
Sarah Leitner	2027		Chicago (2023)	Grant (11th Cir.) / Hermandorfer (6th Cir.)
Spencer Segal	2027		Stanford (2025)	Sutton (6th Cir.) / Oldham (5th Cir.)
Sydney Allard	2028		Yale (2026)	Newsom (11th Cir.) / Thapar (6th Cir.)
David Haungs	2028		Yale (2026)	Thapar (6th Cir.) / Katsas (D.C. Cir.)
Rachel Blatt	2029		Stanford (2026)	Newsom (11th Cir.) / McFadden (D.D.C.)

== Additional sources ==
- Baier, Paul R. (1973). "The Law Clerks: Profile of an Institution," Vanderbilt L. Rev. 26: 1125–77.
- Coughlin, Anne M., "In Memoriam, Writing for Justice Powell", 99 Colum. L. Rev. 541 (1999).
- "Georgia Law Alumni Who Have Clerked for a U.S. Supreme Court Justice," Advocate, Spring/Summer 2004 (listing 6 names).
- "Guide to the Lewis Powell, Jr., Papers, 1921–1988," University of Virginia Library, complete list of law clerks.
- "Hugo LaFayette Black: A Register of His Papers in the Library of Congress." Manuscript Division, Library of Congress (2000–2001), list of law clerks.
- Judicial Clerkship Handbook, USC Gould Law School, 2013–2014, p. 33, Appendix B.
- Newland, Charles A. (June 1961). "Personal Assistants to the Supreme Court Justices: The Law Clerks," Oregon L. Rev. 40: 306–07.
- News of Supreme Court clerks. University of Virginia Law School, list of clerks, 2004-2018.
- University of Michigan clerks to the Supreme Court, 1991-2017, University of Michigan Law School Web site (2016). Retrieved September 20, 2016.
- Ward, Artemus and David L. Weiden (2006). Sorcerers' Apprentices: 100 Years of Law Clerks at the United States Supreme Court. New York, NY: New York University Press. ISBN 978-0-8147-9420-3, ISBN 978-0-8147-9420-3.
