= Ronald Sokol =

American lawyer

Ronald P. Sokol
- Born: Milwaukee, Wisconsin

Academic background
- Education: Duke University University of Virginia
- Thesis: The Puzzle of Equality

Ronald P. Sokol (born 1939), is a lawyer, writer, and a member of the Bar in the United States and France. He is the author of A Handbook of Federal Habeas Corpus (1965) and Justice after Darwin (1975).

Sokol is an op-ed contributor to the International Herald Tribune and The Christian Science Monitor.

== Early life and education ==
Ronald Sokol was born in 1939 in Milwaukee, Wisconsin. He completed his early education at the Whitefish Bay High School. He then moved to North Carolina and at the age of 17 gained admission to study a premedical course at Duke University. There, his extracurricular activities included assisting in experimental kidney transplantation in dogs at the surgery research department. After transferring to study English in the second year, he completed the third year before qualifying. In 1959, at the age of age, he was offered a place at the University of Virginia to study law. Sokol graduated in 1962, passed the Wisconsin bar examination, and was admitted to practice in Wisconsin. He gained his LLM in 1963 with his thesis titled “The Puzzle of Equality”. It was published by the Michie Company later that year.

At Wisconsin he met Daniel Meador, then James Monroe Professor and later Associate Attorney-General under President Carter. The correspondence between Sokol and Meador continued for 45 years and has been collected at the University of Virginia. Meador regularly argued before the U.S. Supreme Court and was a practitioner and scholar of constitutional litigation.

== Career at Virginia ==
After graduating from Virginia in 1962, Sokol was admitted to practice in Wisconsin, but chose to stay on at Virginia to study under Meador and to pursue civil rights studies and international law. In 1963 Sokol obtained an LLM degree finishing a thesis that was published as "The Puzzle of Equality". While working with Meador Sokol began to appear before the U.S. Court of Appeals for the 4th Circuit as court-appointed counsel in habeas corpus cases. Upon completing his degree the university invited him to join the faculty as lecturer in Appellate Practice and Director of an Appellate Legal Aid program which Sokol initiated. For three years Sokol regularly appeared before the 4th Circuit which singled him out in its published opinions as outstandingly able counsel.

In 1965 Sokol drew on his experience to publish A Handbook of Federal Habeas Corpus, the first book on the subject since the 19th century. It was followed by a second edition in 1969.

== Career in France ==
In 1966 Sokol resigned from the university and moved to Paris where he began work on Justice after Darwin, published in 1975. It was one of the first works to bring evolutionary theory to bear on legal problems and on justice in particular and displayed an early interdisciplinary approach to the study of law. In 1967 Sokol moved to Tokyo to study Japanese where he met his wife. They communicated in Japanese until coming to France in December, 1968.

In 1970 Sokol and his wife moved to Aix-en-Provence where they have lived since. In 1973 he was admitted to practice in France and set up his own firm. He continues to argue cases throughout France and to counsel individuals, estates, non-profit foundations, and corporations.

In addition to teaching at the University of Virginia, Sokol has lectured at the University of Aix-en-Provence, the Institute of American Universities in Aix-en-Provence, the Ecoles des Mines in Saint-Étienne, the University of Buskerud in Norway and Imperial College, London. He and his wife have four sons who live in London.

== Bibliography ==
Books

- The Puzzle of Equality: A Search for Meaning. Michie Company. 1967. ISBN 978-0-87215-055-3.
- A Handbook of Federal Habeas Corpus. Michie Company. 1965.
- The Law-abiding Policeman. Michie Company. 1969.
- Language and Litigation: a portrait of the appellate brief. The Michie Company. 1967
- Federal Habeas Corpus The Michie Company. 1969
- The Law-Abiding Policeman, 2nd edition (1969)
- A Short Guide to Aix-en-Provence (1972)
- A Short Guide to Arles (1973)
- Justice After Darwin (1975)
- Modern Legal Systems Cyclopedia, The French Law-Making Process (1990)

Selected Articles

- The Political Trial: Courtroom as Stage, History as Critic, New Literary History, vol, 2 (Spring, 1971).
- Reforming the French Legal Profession, International Lawyer, vol. 26 (Winter, 1992)
- Freedom of Expression in France: The Mitterrand-Dr. Gubler Affair, Tulane Journal of International & Comparative Law, vol. 7 (Spring, 1999)
- French Enforcement of the Hague Convention on International Child Abduction: A Case Study, Tulane Journal of International & Comparative Law, vol. 11 (Spring, 2003)
