= Memogate =

Memogate may refer to:

- Mannygate, a 2004 controversy concerning confidential memos of Democratic staffers on the U.S. Senate Judiciary Committee obtained by Manual Miranda.
- Killian documents controversy, a 2004 controversy involving apparently forged documents critical of George W. Bush's military service, reported on by 60 Minutes
- Memogate (Pakistan), a 2011 controversy about an alleged Pakistani memo seeking the help of the US Government
- Nunes memo, a 2018 controversy regarding a memo about the FBI's obtaining of a Foreign Intelligence Surveillance Act (FISA) warrant
