= Nancy Combs =

American legal scholar

Academic background
- Education: University of Portland (BA); University of California, Berkeley (JD); Leiden University (PhD)

Academic work
- Discipline: Law
- Sub-discipline: International law
- Institutions: William & Mary Law School

Nancy Amoury Combs is an American legal scholar known for her work on international criminal law. She is Ernest W. Goodrich Professor of Law and director of the Human Security Law Center and Cabell Research Professor at the William & Mary Law School.

== Education ==
Combs has a Bachelor of Arts degree in philosophy from the University of Portland, a Juris Doctor from the UC Berkeley School of Law, and a PhD from Leiden University.

== Career ==
Combs served as a law clerk for Judge Diarmuid O'Scannlain and Supreme Court Justice Anthony Kennedy. She joined the faculty at the William & Mary Law School in 2004.

Combs is the author of the books Guilty Pleas in International Criminal Law: Constructing a Restorative Justice Approach (2007) and Fact-Finding Without Facts: The Uncertain Evidentiary Foundations of International Criminal Convictions (2010).

== See also ==
- List of law clerks for the first seat of the Supreme Court of the United States
