= Harvard Journal of Law & Technology =

Academic journal

- Discipline: Technology law
- Language: English

Publication details
- History: 1988–present
- Publisher: Harvard Law School (United States)
- Frequency: Biannually
- Open access: Yes

Standard abbreviations
- Bluebook: Harv. J.L. & Tech.
- ISO 4: Harv. J. Law Technol.

Indexing
- ISSN: 0897-3393 (print); 2153-263X (web)
- LCCN: 89657056
- OCLC no.: 803792826

Links
- Journal homepage; Online archive

The Harvard Journal of Law & Technology is a biannual open access law journal, established at Harvard Law School in 1988. It covers all aspects of technology law, including constitutional issues, intellectual property, biotechnology, privacy law, computer law, cybercrime, antitrust, space law, telecommunications, the Internet, and e-commerce. According to the Washington and Lee Law Journal Ranking, it is the most cited technology law journal and the highest ranked specialized law journal in the United States (out of 1227 journals). Its online component, the JOLT Digest, issues short synopses of recent developments in all areas of law and technology.

During the academic year, the journal hosts lectures and panel discussions dedicated to promoting knowledge of technology and the law.

== Symposia ==
The journal frequently organizes symposia, where a group of academics discusses a particular topic in the area of law and technology which subsequently is published.

== Notable alumni ==
- Lisa Grow Sun
- Jorge L. Contreras
- Orin Kerr
