= Stewards Society =

Secret society at Georgetown University, US

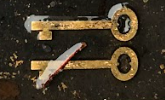
- The emblem of the Stewards (Plaque at Georgetown University)
- Founded: 1982; 44 years ago Georgetown University
- Type: Secret
- Affiliation: Independent
- Status: Active
- Scope: Local
- Chapters: 1
- Headquarters: Washington, D.C. United States

The Stewards Society (collectively referred to as the Stewards) is an anonymous, all-male service fraternity, often considered a secret society, at Georgetown University. The name collectively refers to a handful of loosely organizationally tied groups that have existed since the First Stewards Society's founding. The society remained largely unknown until 1988, when revelations of its existence was revealed in the university newspaper, The Hoya, and became national news. The First Steward Society still continued to operate until splitting in the 1990s, forming the Second Stewards Society and later the Third Stewards Society. The Second Stewards Society operates a charitable endowment that donates to Georgetown University and related student organizations, although the rest of the group's activities are generally opaque to the public.

== History ==
=== First Stewards Society (1982–1988) ===
The Stewards were founded in 1982 as an all-male service group designed as a secret society. Manuel Miranda was among the founders and first leaders of this organization. The group at the time was made up of students in leadership positions.

In fall 1987, the Stewards issued a letter detailing the on-campus traditions to the incoming Freshman class; this letter included an image of a key, the society's logo. On February 9, 1988, Rev. Joseph Durkin, S.J, the advisor of the organization, publicly acknowledged the group in a letter written to the Georgetown student newspaper, The Hoya, announcing his departure from the organization.

Within a week of this letter, the First Stewards Society announced the members had disbanded. Additionally, a number of former members abdicated their various University leadership positions, including the student government president and the editor-in-chief of The Hoya, due to student backlash against the group. John Courtin, an executive director for the Georgetown Alumni Association claimed to have been aware of the group but had limited participation. Internal documents from the Stewards refer to this period of time as "The Great Unpleasantness." The First Steward Society died out soon after.

=== Second and Third Stewards Society (mid-1990s – present) ===
Following the internal split within the First Steward Society, the Second Stewards Society was formed sometime during the 1990s. Around this time, another group referring to themselves as the "Third Steward Society" also formed, claiming to be the direct successors to the original Steward group. Both groups remained predominantly out of the public eye during this time. The Stewards were largely believed by the student body as defunct during this time period; until, in 2001, Speaker of the Stewards Society Adam Augustine Carter published an article in The Georgetown Academy magazine explaining the Second Stewards Society's organization and its objectives. At some point, a clock was installed in Georgetown's Red Square with a plaque referencing a former member of the Stewards and displaying the two-key logo of the organization.

In 2013, an anonymous blogger going by the name "Steward Throat" released a series of internal e-mails from Stewards members, among which were memos showing that a candidate for student government president was an undisclosed member of the Stewards. The exposé resulted in the candidate losing the election and increased scrutiny of the organization and its financial activities. Following this, The Hoya hosted reviews on the 2014 and 2015 candidates for student government positions, outing members of both the Second and Third Steward Societies. The Hoya also described how student government candidates were approached by Steward members during their campaigns. At the same time, a 2000 copy of the group's by-laws was leaked to The Washington Post detailing the structure and senior positions of the Second Stewards.

In 2020, an anonymous group referring to themselves as the White Rose released the identities and personal information about members of the Stewards on Twitter. The group released a series of statements calling for transparency around secret organizations, made cryptic posts regarding the Stewards, and called for a university-wide ban on secret societies participating in student government. A spokesman for the Stewards dismissed the group as spreading "old paranoia and distorted stories" and announced the actions of the White Rose were a violation of D.C. cyberstalking and harassment laws, as well as a violation of university guidelines. The White Rose was loosely compared to Steward Throat by The Hoya. In response to the White Rose, the Second Stewards Society released a statement clarifying their organization and its structure.

In 2025, another candidate for student body president admitted to being a Steward, and subsequently narrowly lost the election.

== Structure and activities ==
Little is known about the structure of the Third Stewards Society but the Second Stewards's structure is known due to The Washington Post leak of the group's by-laws. The motto of The Second Stewards is Non Scholae Sed Vitae ("Not for School but for Life") and their logo is a two-key design. The known positions of the group include the Quaestor of the Treasury, the Keeper, the Dean of All the Years, the Master of the Ritual, and two Guardian Stewards. Little is known about the specific roles of these members, save for that one of the Guardian Stewards is a position held by a Jesuit or Roman Catholic priest.

Today, the Second Stewards Society operates as an anonymous service fraternity, claiming to be a private association and not a secret society. In 2020, the Second Stewards Society stated that they were not designated as a student group, instead calling themselves an alumni association. They have compared themselves to the Sulgrave Club, and have claimed that under NAACP v. Alabama and Roberts v. Jaycees, they operate within legal bounds. The organization claims to prefer to act with anonymity, not wanting members to be known publicly. The Second Stewards Society asserts that members who are asked about participating in the organization are obligated to be truthful and must adhere to an ethical code.

Following the Steward Throat leak, financial documents were uncovered showing the group held net assets of $147,000 and predominately donated to the campus's debate society, theater organization, Habitat for Humanity, and student scholarships. The Stewards also donated to and previously held board positions on previous iterations of the right-wing opinion journal The Georgetown Academy. However, the publication now exists independently of the society. At the time of the White Rose leaks, the organization's endowment was estimated at six figures by The Hoya. The Stewards have stated they played a major role in the funding and planning of a child care center at Georgetown University.

== Reception ==
During the disbanding of the First Stewards Society, the group drew considerable criticism from the student government, student newspapers, and female students. The Stewards have been criticized as having "undertones of conservative religiousness, and.. anti-modern(ism)," and were seen as an effort to "manipulate student opinion and university agendas". Dean of Students John DeGioia stated, "I don't believe that was my responsibility [in reference to the group disbanding], but I did make it clear to them that we do not tolerate the activities of a secret society on our campus." DeGioia claimed to have been previously approached by the organization but refused to offer them any support or formal recognition, as secret societies were a violation of university policy. The magazine Esquire, following the Steward Throat leaks, published a satirical article regarding the Stewards and how other secret societies fail to remain anonymous. The Hoya's editorial board, in 2025, accused the Second Stewards of being historically tied to far-right political advocacy, homophobia, and attempting to punish or dissolve Georgetown's pro-choice group. Other criticisms against the organization include a lack of oversight, former exclusion of minorities, and pushing propaganda towards new students.

The Stewards have contested these claims, asserting that their members include a range of religious and political identities; specifically citing that the student body presidential candidate outed in 2013 identified as a Jewish Democrat and the presidential candidate in 2025 was a pro-choice Democrat. Furthermore, following the White Rose leaks, Second Stewards Society spokesperson Adam Augustine Carter claimed the organization was apolitical and was not "defined by race, faith or ideology."

== Notable members ==
- Manuel Miranda, attorney

== See also ==
- Collegiate secret societies in North America
