= William J. Stuntz =

American legal scholar (1958–2011)

- Born: July 3, 1958; Washington, D.C., U.S.
- Died: March 15, 2011 (aged 52)
- Education: College of William & Mary (BA); University of Virginia (JD)
- Employer(s): University of Virginia; Harvard University

William J. Stuntz (July 3, 1958 – March 15, 2011) was an American legal scholar. He was a professor at Harvard Law School.

He was born in Washington, D.C. and grew up Annapolis, Maryland. He received his Bachelor of Arts at The College of William & Mary and his degree in law at University of Virginia School of Law. Subsequently, he clerked for Associate Supreme Court Justice Lewis F. Powell, Jr. Following this, Stuntz taught at the University of Virginia School of Law for over a decade, before moving to Harvard Law School in 1999.

Stuntz's last work, published posthumously, is The Collapse of American Criminal Justice. He died of cancer in March 2011 at the age of 52. He was an outspoken evangelical Christian.

== See also ==
- List of law clerks for the first seat of the Supreme Court of the United States
