= Lisa Grow Sun =

American legal scholar

Lisa Grow Sun is an American legal scholar based in Utah. She is the Howard W. Hunter Professor of Law at Brigham Young University's J. Reuben Clark Law School. She was the first female valedictorian in Harvard Law School history.

Sun attended Brighton High School in Cottonwood Heights, Utah. She graduated summa cum laude from the University of Utah with a BS in Chemistry before attending Harvard Law School. At Harvard, she was the notes chair of the Harvard Law Review, a senior editor for the Harvard Journal of Law & Public Policy, and an editor for the Harvard Journal of Law & Technology. After law school, Sun clerked for Judge J. Michael Luttig of the United States Court of Appeals for the Fourth Circuit and then Justice Anthony Kennedy of the United States Supreme Court.

Sun has been a professor at BYU Law since 2008. She teaches torts, constitutional law, and disaster law.

== Publications ==
=== Casebook ===
Disaster Law and Policy, (3d ed. Aspen Select 2015) (with Daniel A. Farber, James Ming Chen, and Robert R.M. Verchick)

=== Law Review Articles ===
- Disaster Vulnerability in 3D, 63 B.C. L. Rev. 957 (2022) (with Brigham Daniels, Douglas M. Spencer, Chantel Sloan, Natalie Blades & Teresa Gomez)
- Freedom of the Press in Post-Truthism America, 98 Wash. U. L. Rev. 419 (2020) (with RonNell Andersen Jones)
- Just Environmentalism, 37 Yale L. & Pol'y Rev. 1 (2018) (with Brigham Daniels & Michalyn Steele)
- Enemy Construction and the Press, 49 Ariz. St. L.J. 1301 (2017) (with RonNell Andersen Jones)
- Externality Entrepreneurism, 50 U.C. Davis L. Rev. 321 (2016) (with Brigham Daniels)
- Mirrored Externalities, 90 Notre Dame L. Rev. 135 (2014) (with Brigham Daniels)
- Disaggregating Disasters, 60 UCLA L. Rev. 884 (2013) (with RonNell Andersen Jones)
- Disaster Mythology and the Law, 96 Cornell L. Rev. 1131 (2011)

=== Book chapters ===
- Climate Change and the Narrative of Disaster, in The Role of International Environmental Law in Disaster Risk Reduction 29 (Jacqueline Peel & David Fisher eds., 2016).
- Urban Planning and Climate Change, in Climate Change Law 649 (Daniel A. Farber & Margan Peeters eds., 2016) (with Brandon Curtis)
- War Rhetoric and Disaster Transparency, in Risk Analysis of Natural Hazards: Interdisciplinary Challenges and Integrated Solutions 199 (Paulo Gardoni et al. eds., 2015) (with RonNell Andersen Jones)
- Introduction: The Myths We Live (And Die) By, in Special Issue: Cassandra's Curse: The Law and Foreseeable Future Disasters 1 (Austin Sarat, series ed., Lloyd Burton & Lisa Grow Sun, issue eds., 2015) (with Lloyd Burton)
- Foreseeable Disaster Mismanagement in a Changing Climate, in Special Issue: Cassandra’s Curse: The Law and Foreseeable Future Disasters 65 (Austin Sarat, series ed., Lloyd Burton & Lisa Grow Sun, issue eds., 2015) (with Sabrina McCormick)

== See also ==
- List of law clerks for the first seat of the Supreme Court of the United States
