= Justin R. Walker =

American federal judge (born 1982)

Justin Walker
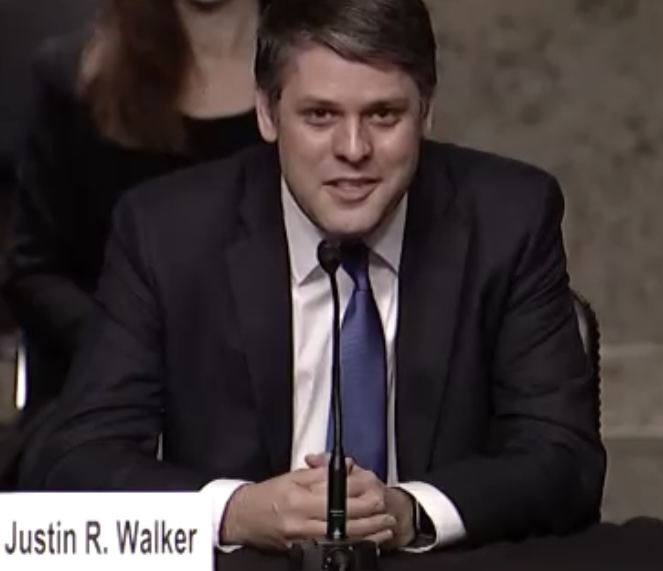

Judge of the United States Court of Appeals for the District of Columbia Circuit
- Incumbent
- Assumed office September 2, 2020
- Appointed by: Donald Trump
- Preceded by: Thomas B. Griffith

Judge of the United States District Court for the Western District of Kentucky
- In office October 25, 2019 – September 2, 2020
- Appointed by: Donald Trump
- Preceded by: Joseph H. McKinley Jr.
- Succeeded by: Benjamin Beaton

Personal details
- Born: Justin Reed Walker; 1982 (age 43–44) Louisville, Kentucky, U.S.
- Party: Republican
- Spouse: Anne
- Children: 1
- Education: Duke University (BA); Harvard University (JD)

Justin Reed Walker (born 1982) is an American attorney and jurist serving as a U.S. circuit judge of the United States Court of Appeals for the District of Columbia Circuit since 2020. He was a U.S. district judge of the U.S. District Court for the Western District of Kentucky from 2019 to 2020 and a professor of law at the University of Louisville from 2015 to 2019.

== Early life and education ==
Walker was born and raised in Louisville, Kentucky. He was named after Justin Hayward, the front man for the musical group The Moody Blues. His father is Terry Martin Walker, a real estate appraiser. His mother, Deborah, and father divorced in 1985 after nine years of marriage. Walker says that he was raised by a "a single working mom" who "made indescribable sacrifices to provide me, the first in my family to graduate from college, with the opportunities she didn’t have herself." Terry Walker claims to have also raised Justin, but Justin cut ties from his father once he moved to college. The relationship is still estranged despite attempts from Terry Walker. His step-grandfather, Norton Cohen, was president of the Acme Paper Stock Company and a prominent member of Louisville's Jewish community, while his maternal grandfather, Frank R. Metts, was a millionaire real estate broker who The New York Times characterized as a "power broker in Kentucky."

Walker grew up in a Democratic household, though his mother had supported Republican Mitch McConnell when Walker was 8 years old. Walker became active in Republican politics at an early age. While a student at Louisville's St. Xavier High School, Walker's step-grandfather arranged to have him interview Mitch McConnell for a class paper, and Walker later interned for McConnell as a college student.

After high school, Walker studied political science at Duke University, graduating in 2004 with a Bachelor of Arts, summa cum laude, and Phi Beta Kappa membership. He spent a year as a speechwriter for U.S. Secretary of Defense Donald Rumsfeld, then attended Harvard Law School, where he was a notes editor on the Harvard Law Review. He graduated in 2009 with a Juris Doctor, magna cum laude.

== Legal career ==
After law school, Walker spent one year in private practice at the law firm Gibson Dunn. He was a law clerk to then-judge Brett Kavanaugh of the D.C. Circuit from 2010 to 2011 and to justice Anthony Kennedy of the U.S. Supreme Court from 2011 to 2012.

After his clerkships, Walker returned to Gibson Dunn from 2012 to 2013. During the Brett Kavanaugh confirmation hearings for the Supreme Court, Walker gave 119 interviews to the media defending Kavanaugh, and gave several paid speeches to the Federalist Society. He has been a member of the Federalist Society since 2006.

From 2015 to 2019, Walker was a professor at the University of Louisville School of Law, where he taught legal writing. In July 2018, Walker had a paper published in The George Washington Law Review reflecting on President Trump's dismissal of FBI Director James Comey and arguing, "calls for an independent F.B.I. are misguided and dangerous... the F.B.I. must not operate as an independent agency. It must be accountable to the President."

== Federal judicial service ==
=== District court ===
On June 19, 2019, President Donald Trump announced his intent to nominate Walker to serve as a United States district judge for the United States District Court for the Western District of Kentucky. Walker was nominated to the seat vacated by Judge Joseph H. McKinley Jr., who assumed senior status on June 9, 2019. The American Bar Association (ABA) rated Walker "not qualified," saying that Walker "has a very substantial gap, namely the absence of any significant trial experience." The ABA stated that "Mr. Walker does not meet the minimum professional competence standard necessary to perform the responsibilities required by the high office of a federal district court judge."

On June 24, 2019, his nomination was sent to the Senate. On July 31, 2019, a hearing on his nomination was held before the Senate Judiciary Committee. On October 17, 2019, his nomination was reported out of committee by a 12–10 vote. On October 24, 2019, the United States Senate invoked cloture on his nomination by a 50–39 vote and later that day his nomination was confirmed by a 50–41 vote. He received his judicial commission on October 25, 2019. His service terminated on September 2, 2020, due to elevation to the court of appeals.

In April 2020, Walker blocked Louisville Mayor Greg Fischer from implementing an order preventing drive-in church services on Easter to prevent the spread of the coronavirus. Walker compared the order to "the pages of a dystopian novel", and said that Fischer "criminalized the communal celebration of Easter". Vox described Walker's opinion as "oddly partisan", noting that there was no actual ban on drive-in church services, and that Fischer had twice attempted to contact the court to communicate this fact, which would have rendered the case moot. The Volokh Conspiracy described the opinion's rhetoric as "over-the-top"; the decision irrelevantly listed deceased former Klan members affiliated with the Democratic Party. In August 2020, Walker ruled that photographer Chelsey Nelson is not bound by the Louisville Fairness Ordinance and cannot be compelled to photograph same-sex weddings, which she opposes due to her religious beliefs.

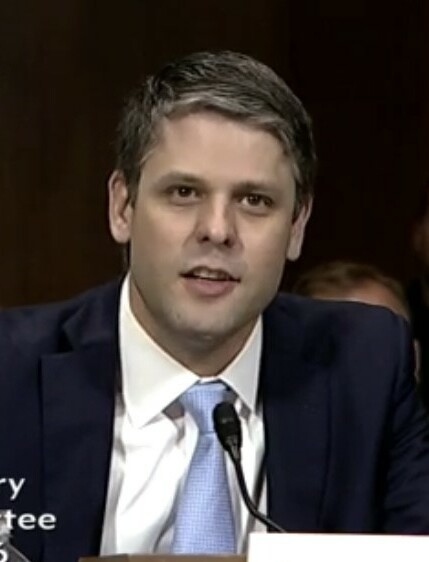
Justin R. Walker U.S. Senate Judiciary Committee hearing - July 31, 2019

=== D.C. Circuit ===
On April 3, 2020, President Donald Trump announced his intent to nominate Walker to serve as Circuit Judge on the United States Court of Appeals for the District of Columbia Circuit. On May 4, 2020, his nomination was sent to the Senate. President Trump nominated Walker to the seat being vacated by Judge Thomas B. Griffith, who retired on September 1, 2020. According to The New York Times, Walker's nomination was handpicked by Senate Majority Leader Mitch McConnell. Walker has been described as McConnell's protégé. In early March 2020, McConnell flew to Kentucky to participate in an investiture ceremony for Walker. At the time of his nomination, Walker had no trial experience and had less than six months of experience as a judge. On May 5, 2020, the American Bar Association rated Walker as "Well-Qualified" to serve on the Circuit Court. The ABA sent a letter to the Senate Judiciary Committee explaining their rating after deeming Walker "Not Qualified" when he was nominated for his district court judgeship. The letter said "the Standing Committee believes that Judge Walker possesses a keen intellect, and his writing ability is exemplary. Judge Walker also has significant appellate experience, having clerked for both the D.C. Circuit and the Supreme Court of the United States. Additionally, since our last rating, Judge Walker has served as a federal trial judge." On May 6, 2020, a hearing on his nomination was held before the Senate Judiciary Committee. On June 4, 2020, his nomination was reported out of committee by a 12–10 vote. On June 17, 2020, the Senate invoked cloture on his nomination by a 52–46 vote. On June 18, 2020, his nomination was confirmed by a 51–42 vote. He received his judicial commission on September 2, 2020.

== Personal life ==
Walker is married to Anne Walker and has one child.

== Selected scholarly works ==
- Walker, Justin R. (2016). "The Execution of the Innocent in Military Tribunals: Problems from the Past and Solutions for the Future". West Virginia Law Review. 119 (1): 1–66.
- — (2018). "FBI Independence as a Threat to Civil Liberties: An Analogy to Civilian Control of the Military" (PDF). George Washington Law Review. 86 (4): 1011–78.
- — (2020). "The Kavanaugh Court and the Schechter-to-Chevron Spectrum: How the New Supreme Court Will Make the Administrative State More Democratically Accountable". Indiana Law Journal. 95 (3): 923–75.

== See also ==
- List of law clerks for the first seat of the Supreme Court of the United States

Legal offices
| Preceded by Joseph H. McKinley Jr. | Judge of the United States District Court for the Western District of Kentucky; 2019–2020 | Succeeded by Benjamin Beaton |
| Preceded by Thomas B. Griffith | Judge of the United States Court of Appeals for the District of Columbia Circuit; 2020–present | Incumbent |
