= Doe ex. rel. Tarlow v. District of Columbia =

- Court: United States Court of Appeals for the District of Columbia Circuit
- Full case name: Jane Doe, I, by her next friend Linda J. Tarlow, et al., Appellees v. District of Columbia and Mental Retardation and Developmental Disabilities Administration, Appellants.
- Argued: February 6, 2007
- Decided: June 12, 2007
- Citation: 489 F.3d 376

Case history
- Prior history: The District Court granted injunctive relief from D.C.'s 2003 statute.
- Subsequent history: Remanded to District Court

Holding
- Upheld the constitutionality of D.C.'s 2003 statute

Court membership
- Judges sitting: Circuit Judge Thomas B. Griffith; Circuit Judge Brett Kavanaugh; and Senior Circuit Judge Stephen F. Williams

Doe ex. rel. Tarlow v. District of Columbia, 489 F.3d 376 (D.C. Cir. 2007) is a unanimous decision of the United States Court of Appeals for the District of Columbia Circuit, written by Circuit Judge Brett Kavanaugh, in which the Court upheld a 2003 District of Columbia statute that stated the conditions for authorizing a non-emergency surgical procedure on a mentally incompetent person. This case developed out of an appeal to a district court decision that was brought on behalf of (ex. rel.) a mentally incompetent patient who was subjected to an abortion without her consent and another patient who was subjected to an eye surgery without the patient's consent. Under the appellate court's interpretation of the statute, a court located in the District of Columbia must apply the "best interest of the patient" standard to a person who was never competent, and the court must apply the "known wishes of the patient" standard to a person who was once competent. The appellate decision was remanded to the District Court.

== Background ==
The following is the background of the case according to the Notes in the 2002 Memorandum Opinion and Order.

In 1978, defendants allegedly gave their consent for an abortion to be performed on plaintiff Jane Doe III, without consulting with Jane Doe III's legal representative and without obtaining substituted judgment from a court. [...] In 1984, defendants allegedly took the same action in regard to plaintiff Jane Doe I. [...] In 1994, defendants allegedly gave their consent for an elective surgical procedure to be performed on plaintiff Jane Doe II's eye, without consulting with Jane Doe II's mother who was also Jane Doe II's court-appointed advocate.

== Procedural history ==
In 2002, the case was brought before the United States District Court for the District of Columbia. District Judge Henry H. Kennedy, Jr. wrote that the plaintiffs may bring the lawsuit against the District of Columbia because there was not sufficient evidence that this case was precluded by earlier litigation in Evans & United States v. Williams. In 2003, Kennedy denied the plaintiffs class action status because there was not evidence the District of Columbia would repeat the alleged harm. The plaintiffs amended their motion for class action status, and in 2005, the court granted class status for the purpose of declaratory and injunctive relief and "enjoined the District of Columbia from authorizing elective surgeries for MRDDA [Mental Retardation and Developmental Disabilities Administration] patients under its present policy, ruling that MRDDA must follow the 'known wishes of the patient' standard in determining whether to authorize surgeries on MRDDA patients. However, the District Court denied class action status in regard to awarding monetary damages.

The decision of the District Court was appealed, and in 2007, the Court of Appeals overturned part of the District Court's decision. The Court of Appeals held that the District of Columbia's 2003 statute was constitutional and the law may distinguish two categories of persons who lack competency. "For patients who once had mental capacity, the decision must be based on the 'known wishes of the patient' if those wishes can be 'ascertained' . . . For those who have never had the mental capacity, the decision must be based on 'a good faith belief as to the best interests of the patient.'"

In 2009 the District Court ordered both parties to submit a joint case management report to propose how the court should resolve the remaining issues in the case, and in 2011 the court authorized the plaintiff to file a second amended complaint and ordered both parties to file another joint case management report. In 2013, the court denied the District of Columbia's motion to dismiss the second amended complaint. District Judge Rudolph Contreras wrote "[t]his case involves weighty allegations that have long awaited resolution. For the reasons discussed above, the court concludes that they must remain unresolved somewhat longer, and will therefore deny the District’s motion to dismiss."

In 2016, the District Court, under Judge Rudolph Contreras, granted in part and denied in part the Defendant's Motion for Summary Judgment and granted in part and denied in part, the Plaintiff's Motion for Partial Summary Judgment.

== Reception ==
The Journal of the American Academy of Psychiatry and the Law Online wrote a case brief on the appellate decision, and stated that the issue of substituted consent is complex and traces its history to England in Earl of Eldon's 1816 decision of Ex parte Whitbread, in the matter of Hinde. The author wrote that the appellate decision in Tarlow would have been approved by Lord Eldon. In the 2011 publication of Health Care Management and the Law: Principles and Applications, Donna Hammaker wrote that the Appellate Court's decision in Tarlow is one of the most recent cases to tackle the issue of medical decision making for the mentally disabled and the court logically determined that an incompetent person may make decisions that have harmful or even deadly consequences because they may not know what is in their best interest. Christine Ryan cited the decision in Tarlow in the Fordham Law Review, and wrote that courts properly apply substituted judgment analysis when the patient once had competency but became incompetent. Snopes.com fact checked whether the decision in Tarlow meant that people with disabilities could be forced to undergo elective surgeries, including abortions, and Snopes determined that the claim was a mixture of truth and falsehood. The argument in Tarlow did "authorize elective medical procedures without first making an attempt to ascertain the wishes of the patient;" however, it did not specifically mention abortion.
