= Gregory Palm =

American lawyer (born 1948)

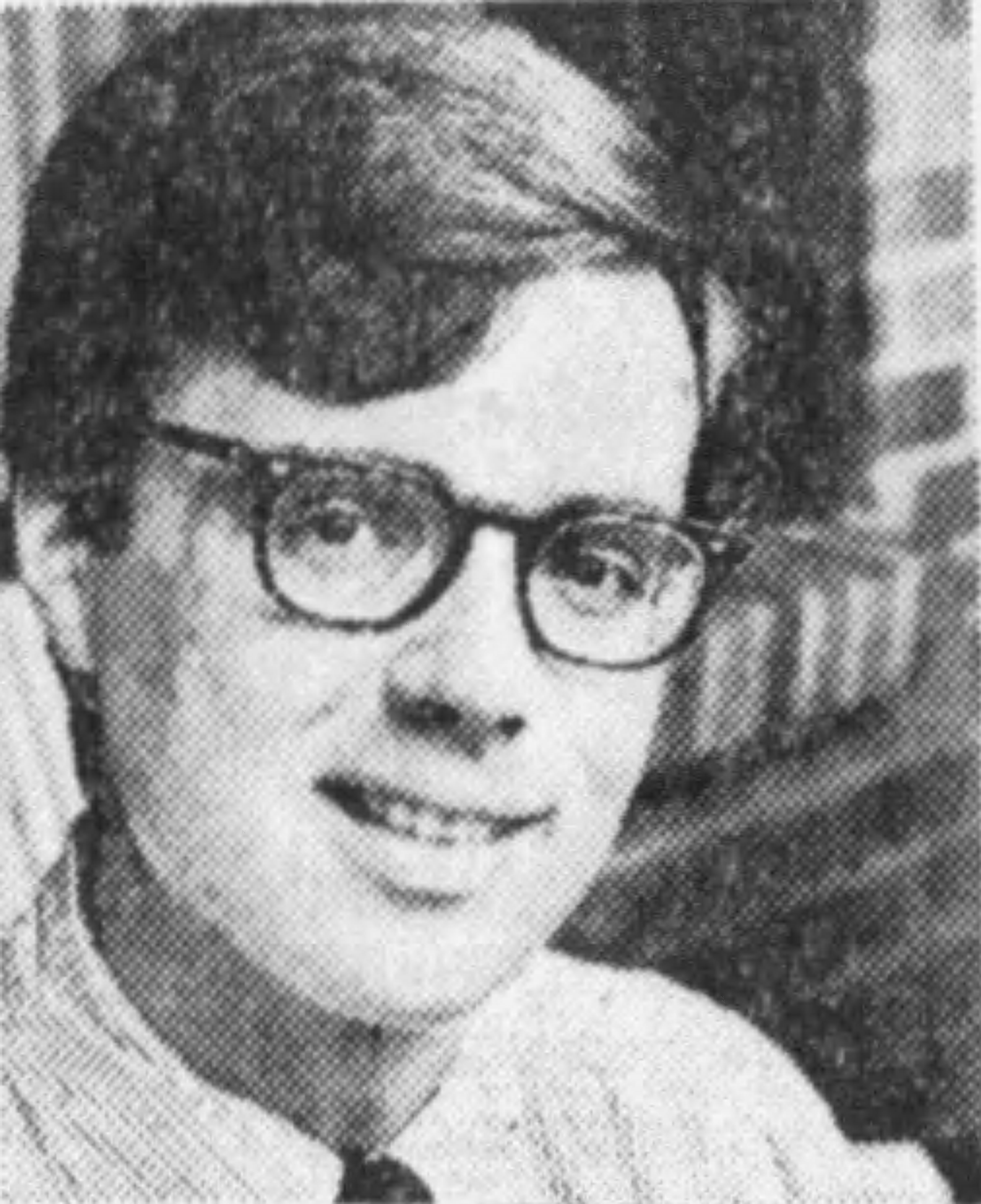
- Palm in 1974
- Born: September 25, 1948 (age 77); Binghamton, New York, U.S.
- Education: Massachusetts Institute of Technology (BS); Harvard University (MBA, JD)
- Occupations: Corporate lawyer; businessman; philanthropist

Gregory Kenneth Palm (born September 25, 1948) is an American lawyer and businessman. He was the executive vice president of Goldman Sachs. In 2019, Palm retired from Goldman Sachs as its general counsel and took a role as its senior advisor. Bloomberg valued his net worth at more than $500 million in 2019. From shares, distributions, and dividends from Goldman Sachs, he is one of the wealthiest corporate lawyers in the United States.

== Early life and education ==
Palm was born in Binghamton, New York, on September 25, 1948. His father was an electrician. Palm attended Chenango Valley High School and graduated from the Massachusetts Institute of Technology (MIT) with a Bachelor of Science, summa cum laude, in economics in 1970. He attended college on a scholarship and was awarded a fellowship from the National Science Foundation. Palm was also a Woodrow Wilson Fellow.

After graduating from MIT, Palm dual enrolled at Harvard Business School and Harvard Law School, receiving a Master of Business Administration (M.B.A.) and a Juris Doctor (J.D.) in 1974, magna cum laude. At Harvard Law School, he was a member of the Harvard Law Review. He was admitted to the bar of New York in 1977 and to the bar of the District of Columbia in 1978.

== Career ==
Palm was a law clerk to Judge Henry Friendly of the United States Court of Appeals for the Second Circuit from 1974 to 1975, during which time he held the record for the longest amount of hours worked with co-clerk James Smoot. Afterwards, he clerked for Justice Lewis F. Powell Jr. at the U.S. Supreme Court. Powell later recommended him to the white-shoe firm of Sullivan & Cromwell. He became a partner at the law firm, then resigned in 1992 to become a general counsel at the legal team, based in London, of Goldman Sachs.

Palm was made a member of Goldman Sach's management committee in 1999. After the 2008 financial crisis, he was paid $38.3 million by the company to purchase stakes. He played a significant role in its $550 million settlement with the U.S. Securities and Exchange Commission on July 15, 2010. As of 2019, Palm owned more than a million shares in the stock of the investment firm, more than any other person. In a memo to the firm that year, CEO David M. Solomon announced Palm's retirement from the legal department. Goldman Sachs appointed Karen Seymour in 2021 to replace him.

Palm is a life member of the American Law Institute.

== See also ==
- Glenn Ellison
- List of law clerks for the first seat of the Supreme Court of the United States
