= Lawrence G. Wallace =

United States deputy solicitor general (1931–2020)

Lawrence Gerald Wallace (March 25, 1931 – February 13, 2020) was a deputy United States solicitor general who argued 157 times before the United States Supreme Court.

== Biography ==
Wallace received Bachelor of Arts and Master of Public Administration degrees from Syracuse University in 1952 and 1954, respectively, and a Bachelor of Laws from Columbia University School of Law in 1959, where he was Editor-in-Chief of the Columbia Law Review. After practicing law for a year with the Washington, D.C. firm of Covington & Burling, he served as a law clerk to Justice Hugo Black of the United States Supreme Court. After completing his clerkship in 1961, he joined the faculty of the Duke University Law School, where he remained until joining the office of the United States Solicitor General in January 1968. Wallace was promoted to Deputy Solicitor General in 1970 and retired from the Solicitor General's office in 2003. In 1989, he received the Mary C. Lawton Award for Outstanding Government Service from the American Bar Association.

== See also ==
- List of law clerks for the first seat of the Supreme Court of the United States
