= Miguel Estrada =

Honduran-American attorney (born 1961)

- Born: Miguel Angel Estrada Castañeda; September 25, 1961 (age 64); Tegucigalpa, Honduras
- Education: Columbia University (BA); Harvard University (JD)
- Employer: Gibson, Dunn & Crutcher
- Political party: Republican
- Spouse: Laury Gordon (died 2004)

Miguel Angel Estrada Castañeda (born September 25, 1961) is a Honduran-American attorney who became embroiled in controversy following his 2001 nomination by President George W. Bush to the United States Court of Appeals for the District of Columbia Circuit. Senate Democrats, unable to block his nomination in the Senate Judiciary Committee after the Republican Party took control of the U.S. Senate in 2002, used a filibuster for the first time to prevent his nomination from being given a final confirmation vote by the full Senate.

== Early life and education ==
Estrada was born in Tegucigalpa, Honduras. After his parents divorced, he immigrated to the United States to join his mother when he was 17, arriving with a limited command of English.

Estrada graduated magna cum laude and Phi Beta Kappa with a bachelor's degree from Columbia University in 1983. He received a Juris Doctor, magna cum laude, in 1986 from Harvard Law School, where he was an editor of the Harvard Law Review.

== Career ==
=== Early career ===
Following law school, Estrada served as a law clerk, first for Judge Amalya Kearse of the U.S. Court of Appeals for the Second Circuit, and then for Justice Anthony Kennedy of the U.S. Supreme Court. From 1990 until 1992, Estrada served as assistant U.S. attorney for the Southern District of New York. In 1992, he joined the United States Department of Justice as an Assistant to the Solicitor General for the George H. W. Bush administration; he continued to serve in that capacity under President President Bill Clinton until 1997. Estrada represented the government in numerous jury trials and in many appeals before the U.S. Court of Appeals for the Second Circuit. Before joining the U.S. Attorney's Office, he practiced law in New York with Wachtell, Lipton, Rosen & Katz. Estrada went on to become a partner with Gibson, Dunn & Crutcher LLP in Washington, D.C.

=== D.C. Circuit Court nomination ===
President George W. Bush nominated Estrada to a position on the United States Court of Appeals for the D.C. Circuit on May 9, 2001. He received a unanimous "well-qualified" rating from the American Bar Association. At the time of his nomination, Estrada had earned the public support of a bipartisan range of individuals and groups that included Ron Klain, counsel to former Vice President Al Gore and future White House chief of staff to Joe Biden; Seth Waxman, Clinton administration principle deputy solicitor general; the Fraternal Order of Police; the League of United Latin American Citizens; the Hispanic Chamber of Commerce; and the Hispanic National Bar Association.

Democratic senators opposed the nomination, calling Estrada a "conservative ideologue" and noting his lack of prior judicial experience at the local, state, or federal level. Additionally, though a member of the Federalist Society, Estrada had never been an academic, so there was no record of his writing by which the Senate could review his record. He had worked in the Office of the United States Solicitor General under Presidents George H. W. Bush for one year and Bill Clinton for six years. He had also been a partner in the same law firm as Theodore Olson, working on the legal team that represented George W. Bush in the Bush v. Gore case. He and his record were well known in conservative circles. He was a friend of Ann Coulter, who acknowledged him in her book. Estrada had also represented Virginia death row inmate Tommy David Strickler before the Supreme Court, pro bono. Estrada unsuccessfully argued a new trial should be granted because the prosecution had withheld evidence that could raise questions as to the credibility of a key eyewitness. Strickler's execution was the first of a white defendant for killing a black victim since the Civil War.

Estrada appeared before the Senate Judiciary Committee on September 26, 2002. At that hearing, Sen. Dianne Feinstein asked Estrada whether he believed that the Supreme Court's decision in Roe v. Wade (1973) was rightly decided. Estrada responded, "'My view of the judicial function, Senator Feinstein, does not allow me to answer that question'". Estrada added, "'I have had no particular reason to go back and look at whether (Roe) was right or wrong as a matter of law, as I would if I were a judge that was hearing the case for the first time'". Estrada also stated that Roe "'is the law as it was subsequently refined by the (1992) Casey case, and I will follow it'".

In a September 19, 2002 article in The Nation, Jack Newfield reported that Estrada had disqualified applicants for Supreme Court clerkships for holding views that were unacceptably liberal. At Estrada's confirmation hearing, Sen. Schumer asked him, "'"Have you ever told anyone that you do not believe any person should clerk for Justice Kennedy because that person is too liberal, not conservative enough, or because that person did not have the appropriate ideology, politics, or judicial philosophy, or because you were concerned that person would influence Justice Kennedy to take positions you did not want him taking'"? Estrada initially stated that he believed that the answer was no, and he later gave "a more definitive no". However, later in the hearing (and after Sen. Dianne Feinstein had specifically questioned him about the article in The Nation), Estrada backtracked on his answer, acknowledging that he might have considered an applicant's ideology if he believed that the applicant had "'some extreme view that he would not be willing to set aside in service to Justice Kennedy'". Under further questioning, Estrada admitted that it was possible that he had made such a conclusion regarding a clerkship applicant. Sen. Schumer commented, "'I think we have some credibility problems here'".

Sen. Schumer also objected to the refusal by the Office of the Solicitor General to release samples of Estrada's writings while he was employed there, although such a release of confidential documents had never been requested for non-Latino appointees and would have been precedent-setting. A year later, Senate Minority Leader Tom Daschle asserted that "the stumbling block to Miguel Estrada's nomination all along was the administration's refusal to allow him to complete his job application and provide the Senate with the basic information it needed to evaluate and vote on his nomination". However, a bipartisan group consisting of all seven living former Solicitors General wrote a letter objecting to the Democrats' demand for such memos.

Leaked internal memos to Democratic Senate Minority Whip Dick Durbin mention liberal interest groups' desire to keep Estrada off the court because of his potential to be a future Supreme Court nominee, and because his Latino roots might make his nomination difficult to oppose. A spokesman for Durbin said that "no one intended racist remarks against Estrada" and that the memo only meant to highlight that Estrada was "politically dangerous" because Democrats knew he would be an "attractive candidate" that would be difficult to contest since he didn't have any record. Democrats argued that Estrada had extreme right-wing views, although others pointed to Estrada's difference with some conservatives on Commerce Clause issues.

After Senate declined to act upon Estrada's nomination in 2002, President Bush renominated him to the D.C. Circuit Court of Appeals in 2003. On January 31, 2003, the Senate Judiciary Committee voted 10-9 to approve Estrada's nomination.

On March 6, 2003, the Senate held a cloture vote on the Estrada nomination. Fifty-five senators voted to end debate on his nomination and allow a final confirmation vote, while forty-four senators voted not to end debate; a total of 60 votes was needed for the nomination to advance to the Senate floor. The Senate held six more cloture votes on the Estrada nomination, and all six were unsuccessful.

After twenty-eight months in political limbo and a protracted six-month battle, Estrada withdrew his name from further consideration on September 4, 2003. Bush nominated Thomas B. Griffith in his place, and Griffith was confirmed in 2005 under the terms of the Gang of 14 Deal.

With the benefit of hindsight, journalist Jan Crawford asserted that "[i]f Majority Leader Bill Frist had shown real leadership, he would never have allowed a Democratic minority to achieve the first-ever filibusters of appeals court nominees. If Trent Lott had been majority leader, Estrada would have been confirmed".

Numerous judicial nominees prior to Estrada had been kept off the courts when the Senate refused to let their nominations out of committee for floor votes. Also, a filibuster had been used in 1968 to extend debate regarding the elevation of Associate Abe Fortas to the position of Chief Justice of the United States. However, the Estrada filibuster was the first filibuster of any court of appeals nominee.

=== Later career ===
Estrada is a partner at the Washington, D.C., law office of Gibson, Dunn & Crutcher LLP.

Estrada joined Rudy Giuliani's 2008 presidential campaign as a legal adviser.

In May 2010, Estrada wrote a letter to the Senate Judiciary Committee in support of President Barack Obama's nominee to the U.S. Supreme Court, Elena Kagan, as Estrada and Kagan have remained friends since meeting as students at Harvard Law School. In his letter, Estrada described Kagan as "an impeccably qualified nominee" possessed of a "formidable intellect" and an "exemplary temperament" despite their differing views on the Court and the Constitution. In 1999, Kagan had been nominated by President Clinton to serve on the D.C. Circuit, but had not been given a hearing or a vote by Senate Republicans. At Kagan's June 29, 2010 confirmation hearing before the United States Senate Committee on the Judiciary, when asked whether she believed that Estrada was qualified to serve on an appellate court, Kagan responded affirmatively and added that she believed Estrada was qualified to serve on the Supreme Court as well. In July 2010, Kagan wrote a letter expressing her belief in Estrada's "superlative" qualifications for appointment to "any federal court", commending him as "a towering intellect".

In March 2017, Estrada was mentioned as a potential nominee for the position of solicitor general in the administration of Republican President Donald Trump. At that time, Estrada told The National Law Journal that he would not accept such a nomination. Estrada added: "'I have only respect and best wishes for those who agree to serve despite the deterioration of the confirmation process over the years, but everyone who knows me in this town knows that I would never accept a job that requires Senate confirmation or, for that matter, willingly place myself in any situation (e.g., a hearing room) in which convention requires that I be civil to [U.S. Sen.] Chuck Schumer'".

== Personal life ==
Estrada was married to Laury Gordon Estrada until her death at age 46 on November 28, 2004. She died of an accidental overdose of alcohol and sleeping pills, having also miscarried during Estrada's judicial nomination fight.

== See also ==
- George W. Bush judicial appointment controversies
- George W. Bush Supreme Court candidates
- List of law clerks for the first seat of the Supreme Court of the United States
