= Christina B. Whitman =

American legal scholar

- Born: Christina Louise Brooks
- Education: University of Michigan (BA, MA, JD)
- Occupation: Law professor
- Spouse: Merrill Jay Whitman
- Children: 2

Christina Brooks Whitman is an American legal scholar who is the Francis A. Allen Collegiate Professor of Law and a professor of women's studies at the University of Michigan. She has taught there since 1976 and specializes in constitutional law, feminist jurisprudence, litigation and alternative dispute resolution.

== Education and career ==
Whitman studied at University of Michigan, where she received a B.A. in 1968, and a M.A. in Chinese literature in 1970. She continued her studies at University of Michigan School of Law, graduating with a J.D. in 1974. After law school, she clerked for Judge Harold Leventhal of the United States Court of Appeals for the District of Columbia Circuit, and then for Justice Lewis F. Powell Jr. of the United States Supreme Court from 1975 to 1976.

Following her clerkships, she began teaching at the University of Michigan School of Law, and was the first female faculty member. From 2009 to 2014, she was the vice provost for academic affairs at the University of Michigan. In 2012, she commented on the oral arguments before the U.S. Supreme Court over the Affordable Care Act. In December 2018, she retired from teaching law courses.

Prior to May 2019, she served as chairman of the board of trustees of the Law School Admissions Council, which oversees the Law School Admissions Test (LSAT).

== Personal life ==
Whitman was married to Merrill Jay Whitman (August 25, 1945 - February 25, 2014), a labor lawyer. They met at the University of Michigan, and have two daughters.

== Select publications ==
- Whitman, Christine B. (1980). "Constitutional Torts". Mich. L. Rev. 79 (1): 5–71. doi:10.2307/1288336. JSTOR 1288336.
- Whitman, Christine B. (1982). "Individual and Community: An Appreciation of Mr. Justice Powell". Va. L. Rev. 68 (2): 303–32. doi:10.2307/1072882. JSTOR 1072882.
- Whitman, Christine B. (1986). "Government Responsibility for Constitutional Torts". Mich. L. Rev. 85 (2): 225–76. doi:10.2307/1288737. JSTOR 1288737.
- Whitman, Christine B. (1999). "In Memoriam: Lewis F. Powell, Jr". Harv. L. Rev. 112 (3): 607–10.
- Whitman, Christine B. (2002). "Looking Back on Planned Parenthood v. Casey". Mich. L. Rev. 100 (7): 1980–96. doi:10.2307/1556082. JSTOR 1556082.

== See also ==
- List of law clerks for the first seat of the Supreme Court of the United States
