= Anne Coughlin =

American lawyer

- Education: Tufts University (BA); Columbia University (MA); New York University (JD)
- Occupation: Law professor
- Employer: University of Virginia School of Law
- Known for: Feminist jurisprudence, criminal law

Anne M. Coughlin is the Lewis F. Powell Jr., Professor of Law at the University of Virginia School of Law.

== Early life and education ==
Coughlin graduated from Tufts University with a B.A. in English in 1978. She then completed her M.A. in English at Columbia University in 1979 before entering law school. She earned her J.D. at the New York University School of Law, graduating in 1984. At NYU, Coughlin served as managing editor of the New York University Law Review.

== Career ==
After law school, Coughlin clerked for Judge Jon O. Newman of the United States Court of Appeals for the Second Circuit and then for Justice Lewis F. Powell of the Supreme Court of the United States.

Coughlin began her academic career at Vanderbilt Law School, teaching there from 1991 to 1995. She joined the faculty at the University of Virginia in 1996, after having served as a visiting professor during the 1995-96 academic year. Coughlin's research focuses on criminal law and procedure and feminist jurisprudence. She is the coauthor of a widely used casebook for first year criminal law courses. She is also the author of a prominent law review article on battered woman syndrome.

Coughlin is notable outside of academia for her leading role in a lawsuit against the Pentagon's policy excluding women from combat roles. Some commentators have credited this lawsuit with influencing the Department of Defense's 2013 decision to reverse this policy.

== See also ==
- List of law clerks for the first seat of the Supreme Court of the United States

=== Publications ===
- Coughlin, Anne (1994). "Excusing Women". California Law Review. 82 (1): 1–93. doi:10.2307/3480849. JSTOR 3480849..
- Coughlin, Anne (1995), "Regulating the Self: Autobiographical Performances in Outsider Scholarship", Virginia Law Review, 81 (5): 1229–1340, doi:10.2307/1073505, JSTOR 1073505.
- Coughlin, Anne (1997), "Of White Slaves and Domestic Hostages", Buffalo Criminal Law Review, 1 (1): 109–136, doi:10.1525/nclr.1997.1.1.109, JSTOR 10.1525/nclr.1997.1.1.109.
- Coughlin, Anne (1998), "Sex and Guilt", Virginia Law Review, 84 (1): 1–46, doi:10.2307/1073806, JSTOR 1073806.
