= Benjamin Beaton =

American judge (born 1981)

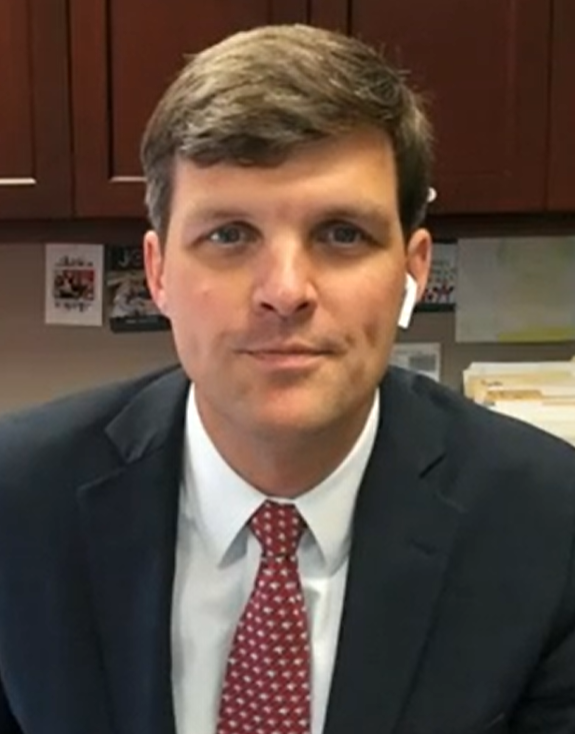

Judge of the United States District Court for the Western District of Kentucky
- Incumbent
- Assumed office December 1, 2020
- Appointed by: Donald Trump
- Preceded by: Justin R. Walker

Personal details
- Born: 1981 (age 44–45) Paducah, Kentucky, U.S.
- Education: Centre College (BA); Columbia University (JD)

Benjamin Joel Beaton (born 1981) is a United States district judge of the United States District Court for the Western District of Kentucky.

== Education ==
Beaton is a 1999 graduate of Paducah Tilghman High School. He earned his Bachelor of Arts, summa cum laude, from Centre College and his Juris Doctor from Columbia Law School, where he served as an Articles Editor on the Columbia Law Review.

== Career ==
Upon graduating from law school, Beaton served as a law clerk to Judge A. Raymond Randolph of the United States Court of Appeals for the District of Columbia Circuit and to Associate Justice Ruth Bader Ginsburg of the Supreme Court of the United States. From 2012 to 2018, Beaton was an associate at Sidley Austin. From 2018 to 2020 he was a partner at Squire Patton Boggs where he co-chaired the firm's Appellate & Supreme Court practice group until his appointment to the bench. Beaton is an adjunct professor at the University of Louisville Brandeis School of Law, where he teaches constitutional interpretation. Beaton is a member of the Federalist Society.

=== Federal judicial service ===
On August 12, 2020, President Donald Trump announced his intent to nominate Beaton to serve as a United States district judge of the United States District Court for the Western District of Kentucky. On September 8, 2020, his nomination was sent to the U.S. Senate. President Trump nominated Beaton to the seat vacated by Judge Justin R. Walker, who was elevated to the United States Court of Appeals for the District of Columbia Circuit on September 2, 2020. On September 9, 2020, a hearing on his nomination was held before the Senate Judiciary Committee. On October 22, 2020, his nomination was reported out of committee by a 12–0 vote.

On November 17, 2020, the United States Senate invoked cloture on his nomination by a 52–44 vote. He was confirmed later that day by a 52–44 vote. He received his judicial commission on December 1, 2020.

== See also ==
- List of law clerks for the sixth seat of the Supreme Court of the United States

Legal offices
Preceded by Justin R. Walker	Judge of the United States District Court for the Western District of Kentucky; 2020–present	Incumbent
