= Daniel Meador =

American legal scholar (1926–2013)

Daniel John Meador (December 7, 1926 – February 9, 2013) was an American legal scholar who taught at the University of Virginia School of Law and the University of Alabama School of Law.

== Early life and education ==
Meador was born on December 7, 1926, in Selma, Alabama. After receiving his Bachelor of Science degree from Auburn University in 1949 and his Juris Doctor from the University of Alabama School of Law in 1951, he served as a Judge Advocate General in the United States Army during the Korean War. In 1954, after returning to the United States, he received his Master of Laws from Harvard Law School, after which he clerked for United States Supreme Court Justice Hugo Black for one year.

== Career ==
In 1957, Meador joined the faculty of the University of Virginia School of Law. He remained a faculty member there until 1966, when he left the faculty to become Dean of the University of Alabama School of Law. In 1970, he returned to the University of Virginia School of Law, where he remained on the faculty until his retirement in 1994. From 1980 to 1995, he was founding director of the University of Virginia's Graduate Program for Judges. He received multiple awards from the University of Virginia, including the Thomas Jefferson Award, the Raven Award, and the Alumni Association Distinguished Professor Award. He served as an assistant attorney general in the United States Department of Justice from 1977 to 1979, in which capacity he organized the Office for Improvements in the Administration of Justice. One of this office's proposals resulted in the creation of the United States Court of Appeals for the Federal Circuit.

== Personal life ==
Meador was married to his first wife, Jan, for 52 years prior to her death in 2008. Despite developing blindness in the late 1970s, Meador continued his legal work for many years thereafter. Meador died on February 9, 2013, at the age of 86, after a brief illness. He was survived by his second wife, Alice Meador, as well as by three children, seven grandchildren, and a brother.

== See also ==
- List of law clerks for the first seat of the Supreme Court of the United States
