= Thomas B. Griffith =

American retired federal judge (born 1954)

Thomas Griffith
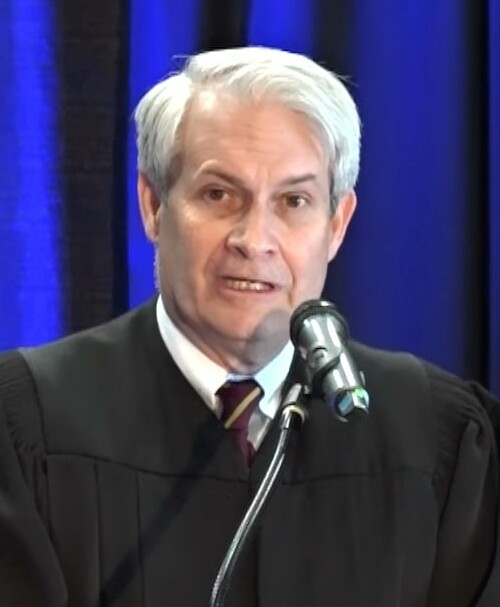

Judge of the United States Court of Appeals for the District of Columbia Circuit
- In office June 29, 2005 – September 1, 2020
- Appointed by: George W. Bush
- Preceded by: Patricia Wald
- Succeeded by: Justin R. Walker

Personal details
- Born: Thomas Beall Griffith; July 5, 1954 (age 72) Yokohama, Japan
- Education: Brigham Young University (BA); University of Virginia (JD)

Thomas Beall Griffith (born July 5, 1954) is an American lawyer and jurist who served as a judge on the United States Court of Appeals for the District of Columbia Circuit from 2005 until his retirement in 2020. Currently, he is a lecturer on law at Harvard Law School, a fellow at the Wheatley Institute at Brigham Young University (BYU), and special counsel in the Washington, D.C. office of the law firm Hunton Andrews Kurth. He is a member of the Federalist Society.

Before being appointed to the D.C. Circuit, Griffith was BYU's general counsel (2000–2005); Senate legal counsel, the non-partisan chief legal officer of the United States Senate (1995–1999); and a partner at Wiley Rein. He is a member of the American Law Institute (ALI) and is also a member of the international advisory board of the CEELI Institute in Prague, supporting the group's efforts to bolster the rule of law in former Soviet states. He formerly served as a member of the Presidential Commission on the Supreme Court of the United States (2021).

== Early life and education ==
Griffith was born on July 5, 1954, in Yokohama, Japan, where his father was stationed with the U.S. Army. He attended Langley High School in McLean, Virginia. During his junior year of high school, Griffith joined the Church of Jesus Christ of Latter-day Saints (LDS Church). He graduated in 1972 as student body president.

After high school, Griffith attended BYU, taking a two-year leave of absence to serve as an LDS Church missionary in South Africa. He graduated in 1978 with a BA, summa cum laude, in humanities with an emphasis in comparative literature. In 1982, Griffith entered the University of Virginia School of Law, where he became an editor of the Virginia Law Review. He graduated in 1985 with his JD.

== Career ==
He worked in private legal practice in Charlotte, North Carolina, from 1985 to 1989. From 1989 to 1995, Griffith was a litigation partner at Wiley Rein in Washington, D.C. Griffith left private practice in 1995 to serve as Senate legal counsel, the chief legal officer of the U.S. Senate. In that position, he gave nonpartisan legal advice to both parties during President Bill Clinton's impeachment trial. After briefly returning to private practice from 1999 to 2000, Griffith became general counsel of BYU.

=== Federal judicial service ===
President George W. Bush first nominated Griffith to the D.C. Circuit on May 10, 2004, to fill a seat vacated by retired Judge Patricia M. Wald. His nomination replaced that of Miguel Estrada, who withdrew his nomination after Democrats filibustered him for over two years.

Controversy arose over Griffith's nomination because his District of Columbia bar membership had lapsed in 1998 for failure to pay dues. Griffith was reportedly unaware of the problem at the time and as soon as he learned of it in 2001 paid the dues and was reinstated. After the Washington Post ran a story about the issue in June 2004, a number of prominent Democrats wrote letters supporting Griffith. Abner Mikva, former Democratic congressman and former chief judge of the D.C. Circuit, wrote that he had known Griffith in and out of government and had "never heard a whisper against his integrity or responsibility." Seth Waxman, who had served as solicitor general under Clinton, wrote that "for my own part I would stake most everything on [Griffith's] word alone." David E. Kendall and Lanny Breuer, two of Clinton's lawyers during the impeachment trial, also wrote letters supporting Griffith.

Some Democrats also objected that Griffith had practiced law for four years as BYU's general counsel without obtaining a Utah law license. His defenders pointed out that it had been the longstanding position of the Utah Bar Association—as explained in a letter to the Senate Judiciary Committee by five former Utah Bar presidents—that in-house counsel in Utah do not need to be licensed in the state as long as they associate closely with Utah bar members when giving legal advice. Griffith said he carefully followed this practice during his time at BYU.

The Senate failed to act on Griffith's nomination in 2004, and it lapsed. Bush resubmitted the nomination for the same seat on February 14, 2005. On June 14, 2005, the Senate confirmed Griffith by a 73–24 vote. Twenty Democrats joined fifty-three Republicans in voting for Griffith's confirmation. (Two Republicans and one independent did not vote.) Democrats voting for confirmation included Barack Obama, Joe Biden, Minority Leader Harry Reid, and Minority Whip Dick Durbin. Despite earlier criticisms of Griffith, the Washington Post endorsed his nomination, noting that he was "widely respected by people in both parties" as a "sober lawyer with an open mind." He received his commission on June 29, 2005.

In 2011, Griffith was included on The New Republic's list of Washington's most powerful but least famous people.

On March 5, 2020, Griffith announced that he would retire from the bench in September of that year. Griffith retired on September 1, 2020.

In April 2021, President Joe Biden named Griffith to the Presidential Commission on the Supreme Court of the United States. In September 2022, Griffith was one of two candidates proposed by the government as a special master to review documents seized in the FBI search of Mar-a-Lago. In July 2023, Judge Christopher R. Cooper of the United States District Court for the District of Columbia designated Griffith as the mediator of a dispute between the United States Court of Appeals for the Federal Circuit and Federal Circuit Judge Pauline Newman.

In December 2022, Griffith was elected to the ALI. He is also a recipient of a Lifetime Achievement Award from the National Law Journal (2022) and a Defender of Democracy Award from the Center for Election Innovation and Research (2022).

== Personal life ==
While working as BYU's general counsel, Griffith served as president of the LDS Church's BYU 9th Stake. He previously served as bishop of the Leesburg, Virginia Ward.

Griffith is married to the former Susan Ann Stell and they are the parents of six children.

== Notable opinions ==
Parker v. District of Columbia, 478 F.3d 370 (D.C. Cir. 2007): Griffith joined Judge Laurence Silberman's majority opinion holding that the Second Amendment protects an individual's right to bear arms and that this right is not limited to members of the military or organized militias.

Davis v. Federal Election Commission, 501 F. Supp. 2d 22 (D.D.C. 2007): Writing for a three-judge panel, Griffith rejected a First Amendment challenge to the Bipartisan Campaign Reform Act's "Millionaire's Amendment," which relaxed contribution limits for opponents of self-financed candidates. Acknowledging that the amendment disadvantaged candidates who financed their own campaigns, Griffith upheld the law on the ground that this disadvantage was the result of candidates' voluntary decisions to self-finance. The Supreme Court subsequently reversed 5–4, finding that the amendment's differing contribution limits for self-financed and non-self-financed candidates impermissibly burdened candidates' First Amendment right to spend their own money on campaign speech. The four dissenting justices called Griffith's opinion "thorough and well-reasoned".

Abigail Alliance for Better Access to Developmental Drugs v. von Eschenbach, 495 F.3d 695 (D.C. Cir. 2007): Writing for an en banc court, Griffith found that there is no constitutional right to experimental drugs and upheld the FDA's policy of limiting access to such drugs as rationally related to the government's interest in protecting patients from potentially unsafe drugs. Griffith's opinion reversed an earlier 2–1 panel decision from which Griffith had dissented.

Kiyemba v. Obama ("Kiyemba II"), 561 F.3d 509 (D.C. Cir. 2009): Dissenting from the panel's holding that a court cannot issue a writ of habeas corpus to prevent the transfer of a Guantanamo detainee to a country where the detainee claims he will be tortured or further detained, Griffith argued that the Suspension Clause entitles Guantanamo detainees to notice and an opportunity to challenge the lawfulness of proposed transfers. In a subsequent dissent from denial of en banc hearing on this same issue, Abdah v. Obama, 630 F.3d 1047 (D.C. Cir. 2011), Griffith further canvassed the history of habeas corpus to argue that the writ has long protected a prisoner's right to challenge a transfer to a location where the writ does not run. Griffith emphasized that Guantanamo detainees were entitled to notice of transfers "only because Boumediene [v. Bush] extended habeas corpus to Guantanamo."

El-Shifa Pharmaceutical Industries Co. v. United States, 607 F.3d 836 (D.C. Cir. 2010): In an opinion for an en banc court, Griffith affirmed the dismissal of a defamation suit against the United States by owners of a Sudanese pharmaceutical plant. The plant owners alleged that following a U.S. missile attack against the plant in 1998, Clinton administration officials had made statements to the press falsely linking the owners to Osama bin Laden. Griffith affirmed the dismissal on the ground that the owners' allegations presented a nonjusticiable political question, writing that "courts are not a forum for reconsidering the wisdom of discretionary decisions made by the political branches in the realm of foreign policy or national security."

Oberwetter v. Hilliard, 639 F.3d 545 (D.C. Cir. 2011): Griffith wrote a unanimous opinion holding that there is no constitutional right to engage in "silent expressive dancing" inside the Jefferson Memorial. The opinion noted that the government has substantial authority to impose reasonable and viewpoint-neutral speech restrictions on a discrete portion of its own property in order to create a tranquil national memorial. In this case, the court held that dancing inside the Jefferson Memorial was prohibited "because it stands out as a type of performance, creating its own center of attention and distracting from the atmosphere of solemn commemoration that the [National Park Service Regulations] are designed to preserve." The court went on to hold that the memorial is a nonpublic forum for purposes of First Amendment analysis: Having "created and maintained the Memorial as a commemorative site, the government is under no obligation to open it up as a stage for the roving dance troupes of the world." The case garnered national attention.

Doe ex. rel. Tarlow v. District of Columbia, 489 F.3d 376 (D.C. Cir. 2007): Griffith joined Judge Brett Kavanaugh and Senior Circuit Judge Stephen F. Williams in upholding a 2003 District of Columbia statute that stated the conditions for authorizing a non-emergency surgical procedure on a mentally incompetent person.

Committee on the Judiciary of the United States House of Representatives v. Donald F. McGahn, II, 19–5331, (February 28, 2020): Griffith wrote the panel's majority opinion, which held that the United States House Committee on the Judiciary could not enforce a subpoena upon President Trump's former White House Counsel, Don McGahn. Circuit Judge Karen L. Henderson concurred, arguing that the House did not have standing to sue, while Circuit Judge Judith W. Rogers dissented. On August 7, 2020, the Court of Appeals for the District of Columbia Circuit en banc ruled 7–2 that the House of Representatives could sue to subpoena McGahn, thereby overruling Griffith's ruling.

== Sources ==
- Church News May 25, 1996.
- Church news April 2, 1994.
- Confirmation Hearing on the Nomination of Thomas B. Griffith, of Utah, to Be Circuit Judge for the District of Columbia. 2005. Archived from the original on October 7, 2012.

Legal offices
Preceded by Patricia Wald	Judge of the United States Court of Appeals for the District of Columbia Circuit; 2005–2020	Succeeded by Justin R. Walker
