= Dabney Friedrich =

American judge (born 1967)

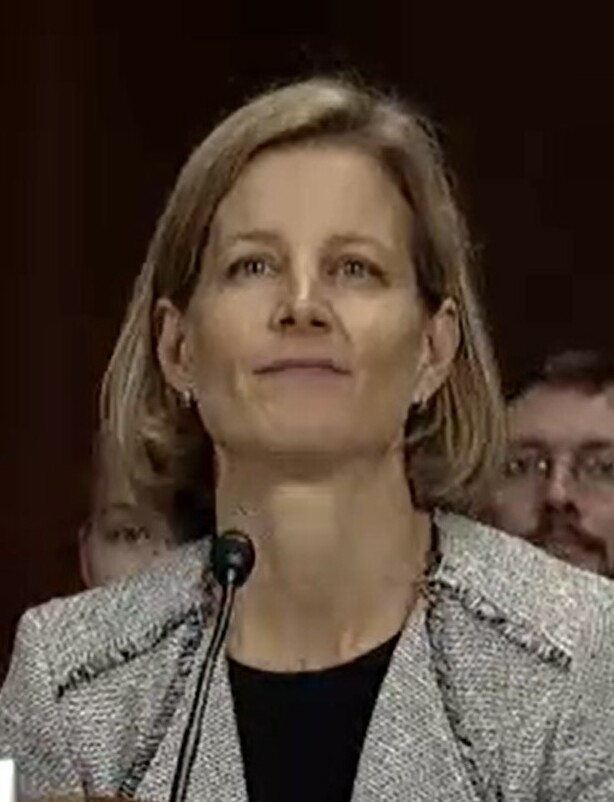
- Friedrich in 2017

Judge of the United States District Court for the District of Columbia
- Incumbent
- Assumed office December 1, 2017
- Appointed by: Donald Trump
- Preceded by: Reggie Walton

Member of the United States Sentencing Commission
- In office December 2006 – December 2016
- President: George W. Bush; Barack Obama
- Preceded by: Michael O'Neill
- Succeeded by: Candice C. Wong

Personal details
- Born: Patricia Dabney Langhorne; 1967 (age 58–59) Pensacola, Florida, U.S.
- Spouse: Matthew Friedrich (m. 2001)
- Education: Trinity University (BA); University College, Oxford (GrDip); Yale University (JD)

Dabney Langhorne Friedrich (née Patricia Dabney Langhorne; born 1967) is an American attorney and jurist serving as a United States district court judge of the United States District Court for the District of Columbia. She previously served as a member of the United States Sentencing Commission.

== Early life and education ==
Patricia Dabney Langhorne was born in 1967, in Pensacola, Florida. She graduated from Trinity University in 1988 with a Bachelor of Arts, magna cum laude. She spent one year at University College, Oxford, receiving a Diploma in Legal Studies in 1989. She then attended Yale Law School, where she was a senior editor of the Yale Journal on Regulation. She graduated in 1992 with a Juris Doctor.

== Career ==
Langhorne started her legal career as a law clerk for Judge Thomas F. Hogan of the United States District Court for the District of Columbia. She served as an associate counsel to the president during the George W. Bush administration, as chief crime counsel to Senator Orrin Hatch, as an assistant United States attorney in the Eastern District of Virginia, as a trial attorney at the United States Department of Justice, and as an assistant United States attorney in the Southern District of California.

In 2006, Friedrich was nominated by President George W. Bush as a member of the United States Sentencing Commission (and ultimately confirmed by the Senate on February 28, 2007), a position she held until 2016. In that capacity, she helped establish sentencing policies and practices for the federal criminal justice system by promulgating guidelines for congressional review and recommending changes in criminal statutes.

=== Federal judicial service ===
On May 8, 2017, President Donald Trump announced his intent to nominate Friedrich to serve as a United States district judge of the United States District Court for the District of Columbia, to a seat vacated by Reggie Walton, who assumed senior status on December 31, 2015. She was formally nominated on June 7, 2017. On July 25, 2017, the Senate Judiciary Committee held a hearing on her nomination. Her nomination was reported out of committee by a voice vote on September 14, 2017. On November 16, 2017, the United States Senate invoked cloture on her nomination by a 93–4 vote. On November 27, 2017, her nomination was confirmed by a 97–3 vote. She received her judicial commission on December 1, 2017.

Friedrich is a feeder judge. Since 2019, she has sent more of her clerks to the Supreme Court than any other district court judge in the country.

==== Concord Management and Consulting ====
In June 2018, Friedrich rejected Russian-owned Concord Management and Consulting's request that she examine the instructions provided to the grand jury before the jury indicted the company. Concord accused Special Counsel Robert Mueller's prosecutors of giving faulty instructions, tainting the grand jury's decision to approve charges.

On August 13, 2018, in the case of United States v. Concord Management and Consulting LCC, she ruled against the defendant, one of 16 Russian entities charged by Special Counsel Robert Mueller, when it sought to void its indictment on the ground that Mueller's appointment to his position violated constitutional separation of powers. In a 41-page opinion, she held that although "no statute explicitly authorizes the Acting Attorney General to make the appointment, Supreme Court and D.C. Circuit precedent make clear that the Acting Attorney General has the necessary statutory authority," "the appointment does not violate core separation-of-powers principles. Nor has the Special Counsel exceeded his authority under the appointment order by investigating and prosecuting Concord."

In January 2019, Friedrich strongly rebuked the attorneys for Concord Management and Consulting for repeatedly making personal attacks on Mueller's team. The rebuke was triggered by a January 4 filing that questioned the trustworthiness of Mueller's office. Friedrich called Concord's recent filings "unprofessional, inappropriate, and ineffective," and said their "relentless personal attacks" would not affect her decision.

==== Alabama Association of Realtors v. HHS ====
In May 2021, Friedrich vacated the temporary federal eviction moratorium issued by the Centers for Disease Control and Prevention, which had been extended multiple times since being enacted by the previous Trump administration. She ruled that the Public Health Service Act did not grant the CDC the legal authority to impose a nationwide eviction moratorium. Under the Biden administration, the CDC had sought an extension of the eviction moratorium, through June 30.

Government offices
Preceded by Michael E. O'Neill	Member of the United States Sentencing Commission; 2006–2016	Succeeded by Candice C. Wong
Legal offices
Preceded by Reggie Walton	Judge of the United States District Court for the District of Columbia; 2017–present	Incumbent
