= Manuel Miranda =

American attorney (1959–2025)

- Born: October 18, 1959; Havana, Cuba
- Died: November 8, 2025 (aged 66); Washington, D.C., U.S.
- Education: Georgetown University (BS); University of California, Hastings (JD)

Manuel Angel Miranda (October 18, 1959 – November 8, 2025) was an American attorney, diplomat, journalist and political advocate. He served as a diplomat at the Embassy of the United States, Baghdad as the first Director of the Office of Legislative Statecraft. Miranda also led U.S. Senate efforts to seat the judicial nominees of President George W. Bush as Republican Senior Nominations Counsel on the United States Senate Committee on the Judiciary and Judicial Affairs Counsel to then-Senate Majority Leader Bill Frist.

== Early life and education ==
Miranda was born in Havana, Cuba, on October 18, 1959. In 1962, he immigrated with his parents to Asturias, Spain, and immigrated again in 1966 to the United States, settling in New York City. He was naturalized as an American citizen along with his father and sister in 1976. He graduated with honors from Our Lady of Mount Carmel School in Astoria, Queens. He attended Archbishop Molloy High School in Ridgewood, Queens, obtaining that school's highest graduation award, the Pvt. Louis J. Willet Scholarship.

He attended Georgetown University's Walsh School of Foreign Service where he was the 1981 Circumnavigators Foundation Fellow, earning a Bachelor of Science in Foreign Service. At Georgetown he served as the student representative on the Walsh School's executive committee and as president of Alpha Phi Omega, the National Service Fraternity. In 2016, he was awarded Alpha Phi Omega's Alumni Lifetime Distinguished Service Award. In 1980, while at Georgetown, Miranda took a leave of absence to work on international refugee assistance as a Junior Operations Officer for the Intergovernmental Committee for European Migration, which is now the International Organization for Migration, at its headquarters in Geneva, Switzerland, where he was assigned to Madrid, Thailand, and the Philippines. As the Circumnavigators Foundation Fellow, in the summer of 1981 he completed a round-the-world tour, traveling alone to 17 countries to study international responses to refugee crises.

During Miranda's time at Georgetown University, he helped found the Stewards Society.

Miranda attended law school at the University of California, Hastings College of the Law, where he was the first Charles Rummel Scholar. He served as chief research editor of the International & Comparative Law Review, as president of Phi Delta Phi, and he worked as research associate to the dean and chancellor.

== Career ==
=== Private law practice ===
Miranda was admitted without interruption to the Bar of the State of New York for over 30 years, as well as to the Maryland Bar. Before public service, he had a long legal career at some of the world's most prominent international law firms, including with White & Case, Reid & Priest, and Winthrop, Stimson, Putnam & Roberts, where he began his career in the canyons of Wall Street. His clients included Mobil Oil Corporation, Ramada Renaissance, International Finance Corporation, InterAmerican Development Bank, Bank of America, Irving Trust, Bank of New York, Credit Lyonnais, National Grid (UK), Caterpillar, PEMEX, BHP Power, and King Ranch.

Miranda's earliest expertise, however, grew in the area of corporate governance. He has organized and structured a number of non-profit organizations, including guiding some in internecine struggles for control. The most notable representation in this area included a four- year litigation over the control of Georgetown University's alumni association and alumni annual fund. Fought against Washington's Williams & Connolly, at the end Miranda won and was recognized by the court as the legal representative of all Georgetown alumni. The groundbreaking case, decided on summary judgement, established the law of the District of Columbia on a number of corporate governance issues. Georgetown settled at the end, wrapping up that and all related actions.

At Russin & Vecchi, Miranda represented, among others, the Russian Orthodox Church of America, including advice in internecine battles over the control of parish corporate boards and a national, year-long audit of the Church's exposure.

He assisted clients in immigration, corporate governance and crisis management, and as canon law counsel to Oscar-winning screenwriter and producer of The Exorcist, William Peter Blatty, winning for him a favorable result at the Vatican in a case against Georgetown University.

==== United States Senate ====
In 2001, Miranda joined the staff of the United States Senate, where he was assigned to the Committee on the Judiciary as Nominations Counsel in the staff of Senator Orrin Hatch. Senate Democrats had just commenced a new strategy led by Senator Ted Kennedy (D-MA) to block the appellate court nominees of President George W. Bush using process requests to disguise ideological litmus tests. Miranda quickly became a skilled strategic defender of the Bush nominees garnering significant press and public attention, especially in the nominations of Miguel Estrada and William H. Pryor Jr. Miranda stressed Estrada's Honduran immigrant roots and argued the attack on Pryor showed anti-Catholic bigotry. The strategy infuriated opponents. Senator Dianne Feinstein (D-CA) called the Republican messaging “tawdry and diabolical.” A few days later the Roman Catholic Archbishop of Denver, the Most Rev. Charles J. Chaput, wrote a widely published condemnation of Senate Democrats for engaging in “a new kind of religious discrimination” against Catholics.

By January 2003, Miranda had become Judicial Affairs Counsel to the new Senate Majority Leader, Dr. Bill Frist (R-TN). As a top leadership staffer, he now rallied 51 Republican senators and their staffs on judicial nominations and orchestrated four historic Senate floor events with Vice President Dick Cheney presiding, including a continuous 40-hour debate imaging the public's idea of a filibuster, and an unprecedented national media campaign, marshaling nationwide grassroots and grasstop support.

When he retired from the Senate in late 2006, Majority Leader Bill Frist described judicial nominations as his signature issue. No Senate Majority Leader has spent more Senate floor time debating judicial nominees, and there has never been more news and editorial coverage on that issue than in 2003. In less than one year, Republicans turned public opinion on the issue from 2 to 1 against them, to 2 to 1 for their position that every nominee deserved a vote. As a result, judicial nominations were a looming issue in the elections of 2002 and 2004 and have been in presidential and senate elections ever since. In 2004, that issue lost Democrats not only the majority but also the Senate seat of their Majority Leader, tom Daschle (D-SD). Miranda is credited for this effort and much more. To avoid the debacle experienced in 1987 with the nomination of Robert Bork, Miranda is credited with devising the “Miranda Plan,” ensuring rapid endorsement on the record of a Republican president's Supreme Court nominees – a plan that has been deployed since the nomination of Chief Justice John Roberts in 2005.

As the highest ranking Hispanic in the Senate Republican staff, Miranda represented Senate leadership to establish the Congressional Hispanic Conference.

=== Memogate ===
On November 14, 2003, on the last morning of the Senate's 40-hour “talkathon” on judicial filibusters, The Wall Street Journal published an editorial entitled “He is Latino” that outlined a series of Senate staff memos illustrating the hand-in-glove relationship between Senate Democrats and left-wing interest groups in coordinating the obstruction of Bush judicial nominees.

Thus commenced the Memogate scandal during which Democrats accused Republicans (especially Miranda) of “stealing” their "confidential" strategy memos, Republicans demanded an investigation of Democrats’ possibly unlawful collusion with special interests, and the Press took sides in a two-year debate over which of those two stories was the more important.

In February 2004, Miranda resigned his Senate position in an unusually public manner calling for an investigation of the Democrat memos. His resignation letter was published in full by National Review. His resignation also suggested a Republicans leadership surrender that launched Miranda as a conservative hero.

Miranda took an unwavering position that he was fully entitled by the Code of Ethics for Government Service to read the unprotected documents accessible on his desktop, especially if they might evidence corruption. A report prepared by the Sergeant at Arms following a thorough investigation concluded that "a clerk in the [Republican Majority's] Nominations Unit had admitted to them that day that he had accessed Democratic files over the Committee's computer system...The clerk who initially discovered how to access the files told investigators that he was not sure what to look for in the files, so Mr. Miranda would guide him as to what information was helpful."

Miranda never backed down, while Democrats demanded his demise he published a law review article on the law and ethics of Memogate and then brought a lawsuit to invite a federal judge to give him a declaratory judgment on Democrats’ claims against him, laying out in both cases allegations of Democrat Senators' wrongdoing.

Soon after leaving the Senate, Miranda became a visiting legal fellow at The Heritage Foundation, working for former U.S. Attorney General Ed Meese, and serving as a regular columnist for The Wall Street Journal, where he published 35 columns under the banner "The Next Justices".

Memogate entered the news again during the hearings for the Supreme Court nomination of Brett Kavanaugh, in 2018. Kavanaugh was accused of perjury for claiming he was not aware of the source of the Memogate documents, when emails between him and Miranda included as an attachment at least one document that Democrat Senator Patrick Leahy described as “stolen.” Miranda issued a statement noting again that nothing had been “stolen” and that Kavanaugh was never made aware of Democrats’ negligent publication of their own strategy memos on an open server.

=== Public advocacy ===
As President of the Cardinal Newman Society, Miranda had many years’ experience as a public advocate before working in the Senate. Over the years, he has made over 200 radio and television appearances in English and Spanish. He has a decades-old history of advocacy as a Georgetown University alumnus.

After leaving Capitol Hill, Miranda organized the "National Coalition to End Judicial Filibusters" to support the "nuclear option" or "constitutional option" that he had helped pioneer on Senator Bill Frist's leadership team. The idea was a procedural motion under Senate precedent designed to have Vice President Dick Cheney, acting as President of the Senate, rule unconstitutional the Senate's six decade old application to judicial nominations of the filibuster rule, now being used in an unprecedented manner to stall Bush administration judicial nominees, including potentially against nominees to the Supreme Court. After the Gang of 14 compromise that put off the high stakes Senate confrontation, the Coalition renamed itself the "Third Branch Conference", a grasstops coalition of 200 national conservative leaders.

As Chairman of the Third Branch Conference, Miranda became a leading conservative movement voice on judicial nominations, coming to lead conservatives in opposing George W. Bush's nomination of Harriet Miers to the Supreme Court. That opposition became a turning point for conservatives during the Bush presidency. For his role, Miranda received the American Conservative Union's Ronald Reagan Award. In announcing the award, ACU President David Keene told the Conservative Political Action Conference banquet audience: "[Sam Alito’s] nomination would not have been made but for Manny Miranda and because of the coalition that he put together; that nomination would still be being debated, were it not for Manny Miranda.” Miranda brought the conservative audience to a sustained standing ovation when he told them: “What has driven me in the past three years, … has been that I wasn’t born in this country. And I have come to know that our Constitution and our court system is …a very important reason why this country is great. And so, anything that I have been doing is simply to say thank you to this country that took in my mother and father and their two young children."

At the end of 2006, Miranda made front-page news when he formed another wide coalition, Families First on Immigration. Its purpose was to promote a compassionate compromise to immigration legal reform based on a seven-point program called "Good Stewards, Good Neighbor." The proposal was endorsed and summarized by Evangelical leader Tony Perkins in his 2008 book on faith and policy.

=== Diplomatic service in Iraq ===
In 2007 and 2008, Miranda served as a diplomat with the United States Embassy in Iraq as the first Director of the Office for Legislative Statecraft. He oversaw organizational change experts, lawyers and programs designed to stand up the Iraqi Council of Ministers Secretariat and the Prime Minister's Legal Office. Miranda also worked with the Iraq and Kurdistan Bars and brokered a signed reconciliation between them that according to a 2008 USAID Report, significantly increased access to justice for the Iraqi people. In 2007, he brought Iraq and Iraqi Kurdistan's legal leaders to Washington, arranging visits for them with White House counsel, with Chief Justice John Roberts, and with key House and Senate leaders. In 2008, Miranda made news again when a memorandum to U.S. Ambassador Ryan Crocker was leaked.

== Death ==
Miranda died in Washington, D.C., on November 8, 2025, at the age of 66.
