= List of United States federal courthouses in Michigan =

Following is a list of current and former courthouses of the United States federal court system located in Michigan. Each entry indicates the name of the building along with an image, if available, its location and the jurisdiction it covers, the dates during which it was used for each such jurisdiction, and, if applicable the person for whom it was named, and the date of renaming. Dates of use will not necessarily correspond with the dates of construction or demolition of a building, as pre-existing structures may be adapted or court use, and former court buildings may later be put to other uses. Also, the official name of the building may be changed at some point after its use as a federal court building has been initiated.

== Courthouses ==
Courthouse	City	Image	Street address	Jurisdiction	Dates of use	Named for
Federal Building	Ann Arbor		200 East Liberty Street	E.D. Mich.	?–present	n/a
U.S. Court House, Post Office, and Custom House	Bay City		Washington Ave. between 3rd & 4th	E.D. Mich.	1893–1931; Razed in 1931.	n/a
U.S. Post Office Building	Bay City		1000 Washington Avenue	E.D. Mich.	1932–present	n/a
Custom House	Detroit		NW Corner of Griswold and Larned Streets	E.D. Mich.	1861–1897	n/a
Post Office, Courthouse and Custom House	Detroit		231 West Lafayette Boulevard	E.D. Mich.	1897–1934	n/a
Theodore Levin United States Courthouse	Detroit		231 West Lafayette Boulevard	E.D. Mich.	1934–present	District Court judge Theodore Levin
Federal Building and U.S. Courthouse†	Flint		600 Church Street	E.D. Mich.	?–present	n/a
U.S. Courthouse and Post Office	Grand Rapids		Ionia Street	W.D. Mich.	1879–1909; Demolished in 1909	n/a
Woodbridge N. Ferris Building†	Grand Rapids		17 Pearl Street Northwest	W.D. Mich.	1911–? Now used by the Kendall College of Art and Design	n/a
Gerald R. Ford Federal Building & U.S. Courthouse	Grand Rapids		110 Michigan Street Northwest	W.D. Mich.	1971–present	President Gerald Ford
Federal Bldg, U.S. Post Office & Courthouse†	Kalamazoo		410 West Michigan Avenue	W.D. Mich.	1939–present	n/a
Charles E. Chamberlain Federal Building & Post Office†	Lansing		315 West Allegan Street	W.D. Mich.	1934–present	U.S. Rep. Charles E. Chamberlain
U.S. Post Office and Courthouse	Marquette		202 West Washington Street	W.D. Mich.	1937–present	n/a
Federal Building†	Port Huron		526 Water Street	E.D. Mich.	1877–present	n/a
United States Post Office†	Sault Sainte Marie		209 East Portage Avenue	W.D. Mich.	1912–1941; Now being converted to the City Hall.	n/a

== Key ==
^{†}	Listed on the National Register of Historic Places (NRHP)
^{††}	NRHP-listed and also designated as a National Historic Landmark

== See also ==
- List of United States federal courthouses
