= List of first minority male lawyers and judges in Michigan =

This is a list of the first minority male lawyer(s) and judge(s) in Michigan. It includes the year in which the men were admitted to practice law (in parentheses). Also included are men who achieved other distinctions such becoming the first in their state to graduate from law school or become a political figure.

== Firsts in state history ==
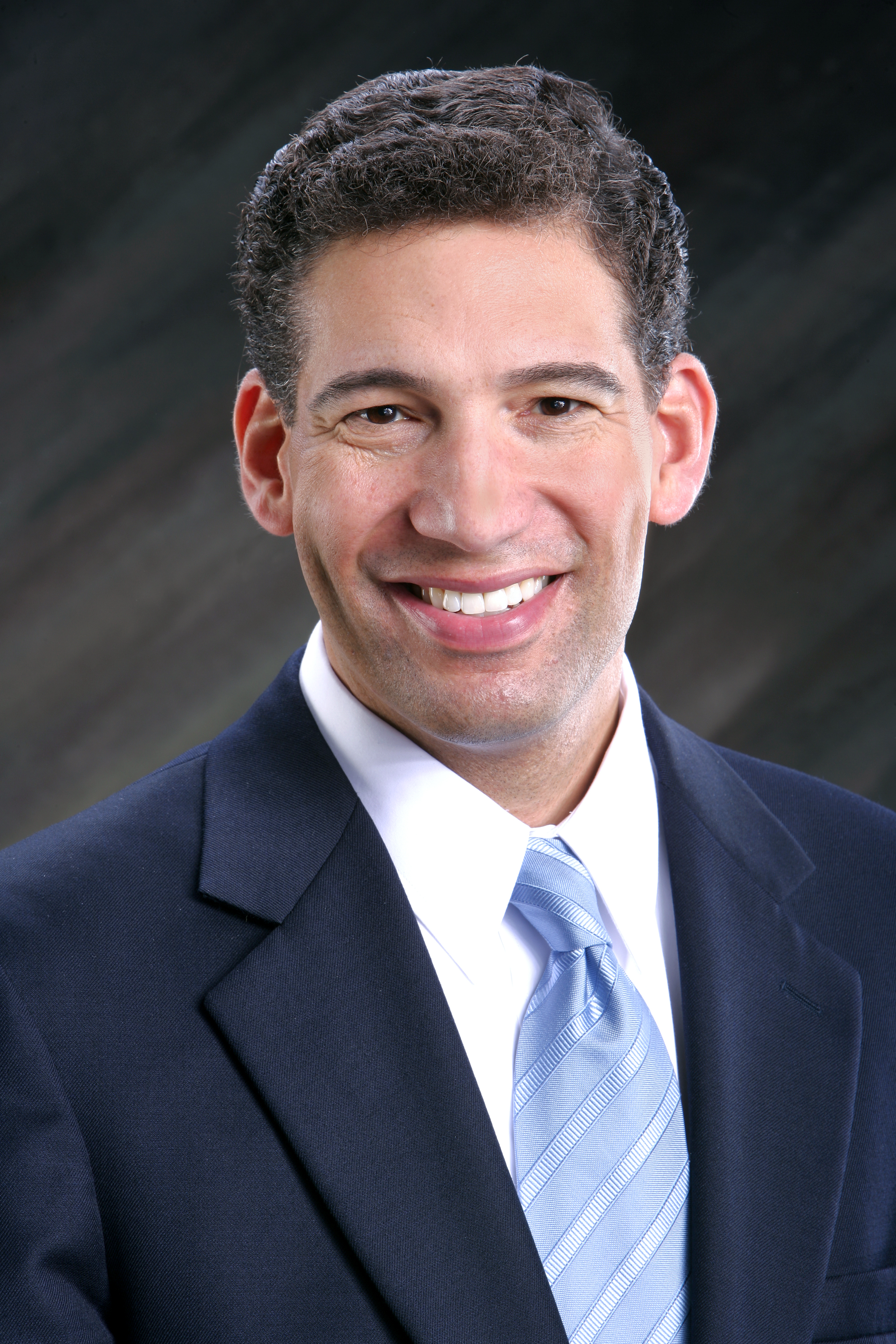
Patrick Miles: First African American male to serve as the U.S. Attorney for the Western District of Michigan (2012)

=== Law degree ===
- First African American male law graduate: Gabriel F. Hargo in 1870

=== Lawyers ===
- First African American: John C. McLeod (1870)
- First African American lawyer to appear before the Michigan Supreme Court: David "D." Augustus Straker during the 1880s
- First Asian American male (Japanese descent): Arthur K. Ozawa (1910)
- First Arab American and Muslim-American male: Michael Berry (1950)

=== Law clerk ===
- First African American male (U.S. District Court for Michigan): Harry G. Hackett in 1954

=== State judges ===
- First African American male (jurist/commissioner): David "D." Augustus Straker in 1892
- First Jewish American male: Charles C. Simons in 1923
- First Jewish American male (Third Judicial Circuit): Harry B. Keidan in 1927
- First Jewish American male (Michigan Supreme Court): Henry M. Butzel in 1929
- First Greek American male: Emmanuel N, Karay in 1946
- First African American male (judge): Charles W. Jones in 1950 (upon his appointment to the Recorder's Court)
- First African American male (to win a countywide judicial election): Wade McCree Jr. in 1955
- First African American male (Common Pleas Court): Elvin L. Davenport in 1956
- First African American male (elected; Recorder's Court): Elvin L. Davenport in 1957
- First African-American male (Michigan Supreme Court): Otis M. Smith (1950) in 1961
- First Latino American male: George La Plata (1956) in 1973
- First Armenian-American male: Arpo Yemen in 1975
- First Muslim American male: Adam Shakoor in 1981
- First African American male (Chief Justice; Michigan Supreme Court): Conrad Mallett, Jr. (1979) around 1994
- First openly gay male: Rudolph "Rudy" Serra in 2004
- First blind male (Michigan Supreme Court): Richard H. Bernstein (1999) in 2014

=== Federal judge ===
- First Jewish American male: Charles C. Simons in 1932
- First African American male (bankruptcy referee): Harry G. Hackett in 1954
- First Arab American male (U.S. District Court for the Eastern District of Michigan): George Caram Steeh III in 1998

=== Assistant Attorney General ===
- First African American male: Harold E. Bledsoe

=== United States Attorney ===
- First African American male: Saul A. Green
- First African American male (Western District of Michigan): Patrick Miles Jr. in 2012

=== Prosecuting Attorney (District Attorney) ===
- First African American male: Percy J. Langster in 1948

=== Bar Association ===
- First Jewish American male president: William H. Ellmann in 1967
- First African American male president: Dennis Archer (1970) from 1984-1985

=== Faculty ===
- First African-American male (University of Michigan Law School professor): Harry T. Edwards (1965) in 1970

== Firsts in local history ==
- George Mendez: First Mexican American male lawyer in southeastern Michigan
- Bill Baillargeon: First openly gay male judge in Allegan County, Michigan (2010)
- Oscar W. Baker: First African-American male lawyer in Bay City, Michigan [Bay County, Michigan]
- James Golden (1928): First African American male lawyer in Battle Creek, Michigan [Calhoun County, Michigan]
- Shelton Penn: First African American male judge in Calhoun County, Michigan (1975)
- Ollie B. Bivins Jr.: First African American male to serve as a Judge of the Flint Municipal Court (1969) and Genesee County Circuit Court, Michigan (1972)
- Elisha Scott: First African American male to serve as an administrative judge in Flint, Michigan [Genesee County, Michigan]
- Claude W. Haywood: First African American male admitted to the Genesee County Bar Association, Michigan
- William Price III: First African American male to serve as President of the Genesee County Bar Association, Michigan (1970-1971)
- Anthony Flores: First Latino American male to serve as a Judge of the 54A Judicial District Court [Ingram County, Michigan]
- Stuart Dunnings Jr. (1950): First African-American male lawyer in Lansing, Michigan [Ingham, Clinton, and Eaton Counties, Michigan]
- Stuart Black: First African American judge in Isabella County, Michigan (2018)
- Charles A. Pratt: First African American male judge in Kalamazoo County, Michigan (1968)
- Leroy Densmore Jr.: First African American male to serve as the Assistant District Attorney in Kalamazoo County, Michigan (c. 1973)
- Olivier M. Green: First African American male elected as a member of the Grand Rapids Bar Association (1925) [Kent County, Michigan]
- John T. Letts: First African American male elected as a judge in Kent County, Michigan (1959)
- Percy J. Langster: First African American male to serve as the Prosecuting Attorney for Lake County, Michigan (1948)
- Oliver Green: First African-American male lawyer in Pontiac, Michigan (1926) [Oakland County, Michigan]
- Michael Martinez: First Hispanic American male judge in Oakland County, Michigan (2004)
- Jake Cunningham: First openly LGBT male judge in Oakland County, Michigan (2019)
- Terry L. Clark: First African American male judge in Saginaw County, Michigan
- Wallace Weatherly: First African American male lawyer in Sturgis, St. Joseph County, Michigan
- Harry B. Keidan: First Jewish American male appointed as a Judge of the Third Judicial Circuit in Michigan (1927) [Wayne County, Michigan]
- Damon J. Keith: First African American male lawyer for the Wayne County Friend of the Court (1959)
- Wade McCree Jr.: First African American male appointed as a Judge of the Wayne County Circuit Court in Michigan
- Isidore Torres: First Latino American male judge in Wayne County, Michigan (1983)
- James Rashid: First Arab American male to serve as a Judge on the Third Circuit Court (1986)
- Sam Salamey: First Arab American male to serve as a Judge of the 19th District Court (2023) [Dearborn, Wayne County, Michigan]
- Frank H. Wu: First Asian American male to serve as the Dean of Wayne State University Law School (2004)
- Elvin L. Davenport: First African American male elected as a Judge of the Common Pleas Court for the City of Detroit (1956) and later the Recorder’s Court for the City of Detroit (1957) [Wayne County, Michigan]
- M. John Shamo: First Arab American male elected as a Criminal Judge of the Detroit Recorder's Court (1981) [Wayne County, Michigan]
- Lawrence García: First Latino American male to serve as the City Attorney of Detroit, Wayne County, Michigan

== See also ==
- List of first minority male lawyers and judges in the United States

== Other topics of interest ==
- List of first women lawyers and judges in the United States
- List of first women lawyers and judges in Michigan
