= Zatkoff =

Zatkoff is a surname. Notable people with the surname include:

- Jeff Zatkoff (born 1987), American ice hockey player
- Lawrence Paul Zatkoff (1939–2015), American judge
- Roger Zatkoff (1931–2021), American football player and businessman
