= Thomas Patrick Thornton =

American judge in Michigan (1898–1985)

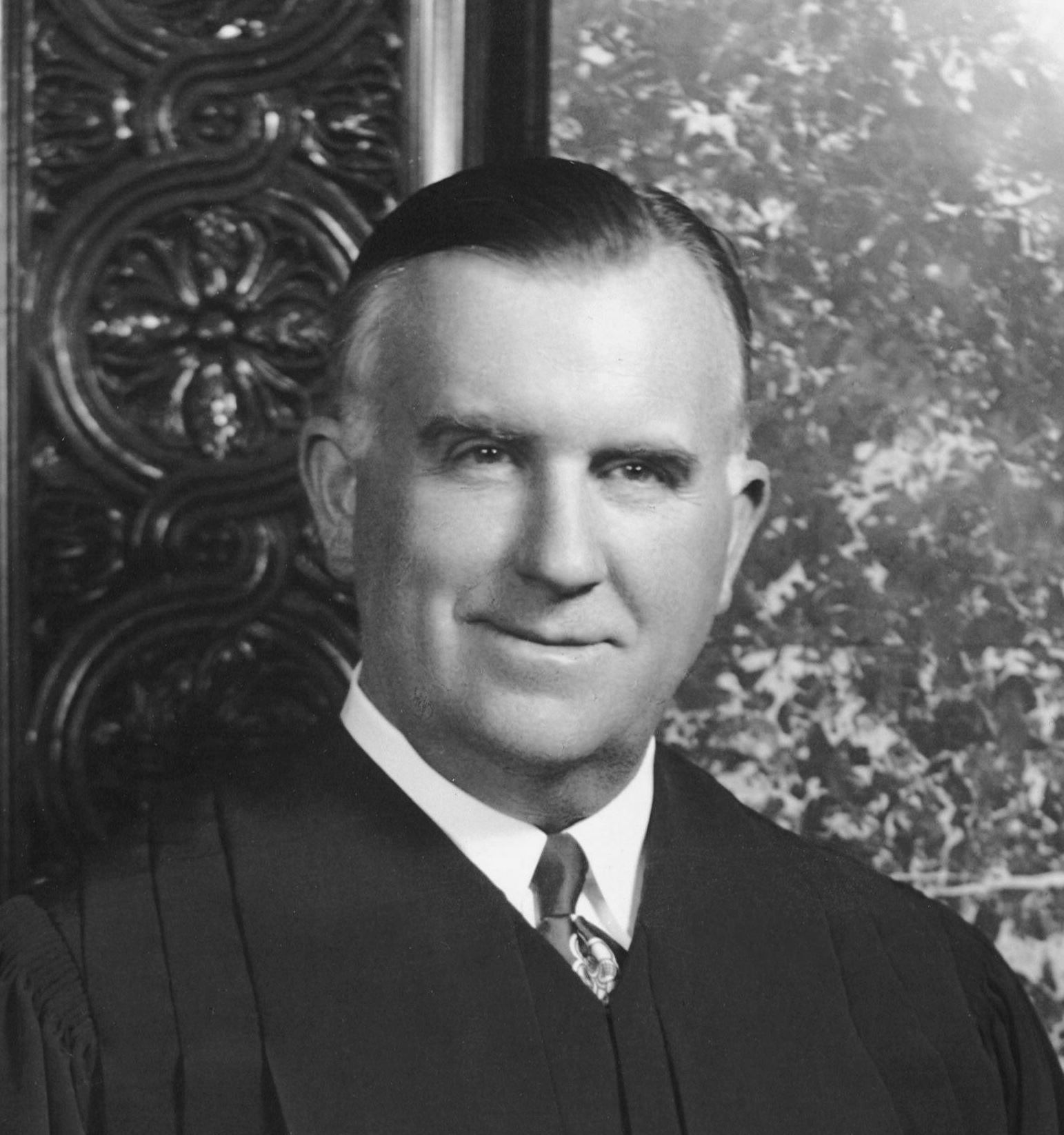

Senior Judge of the United States District Court for the Eastern District of Michigan
- In office February 15, 1966 – July 1, 1985

Judge of the United States District Court for the Eastern District of Michigan
- In office February 2, 1949 – February 15, 1966
- Appointed by: Harry S. Truman
- Preceded by: Ernest Aloysius O'Brien
- Succeeded by: Damon Keith

Personal details
- Born: Thomas Patrick Thornton; March 8, 1898 Boston, Massachusetts
- Died: July 1, 1985 (aged 87) Detroit, Michigan
- Resting place: Mount Olivet Cemetery; Detroit, Michigan
- Education: University of Detroit Mercy School of Law (LL.B.)

Thomas Patrick Thornton (March 8, 1898 – July 1, 1985) was a United States district judge of the United States District Court for the Eastern District of Michigan.

== Education ==
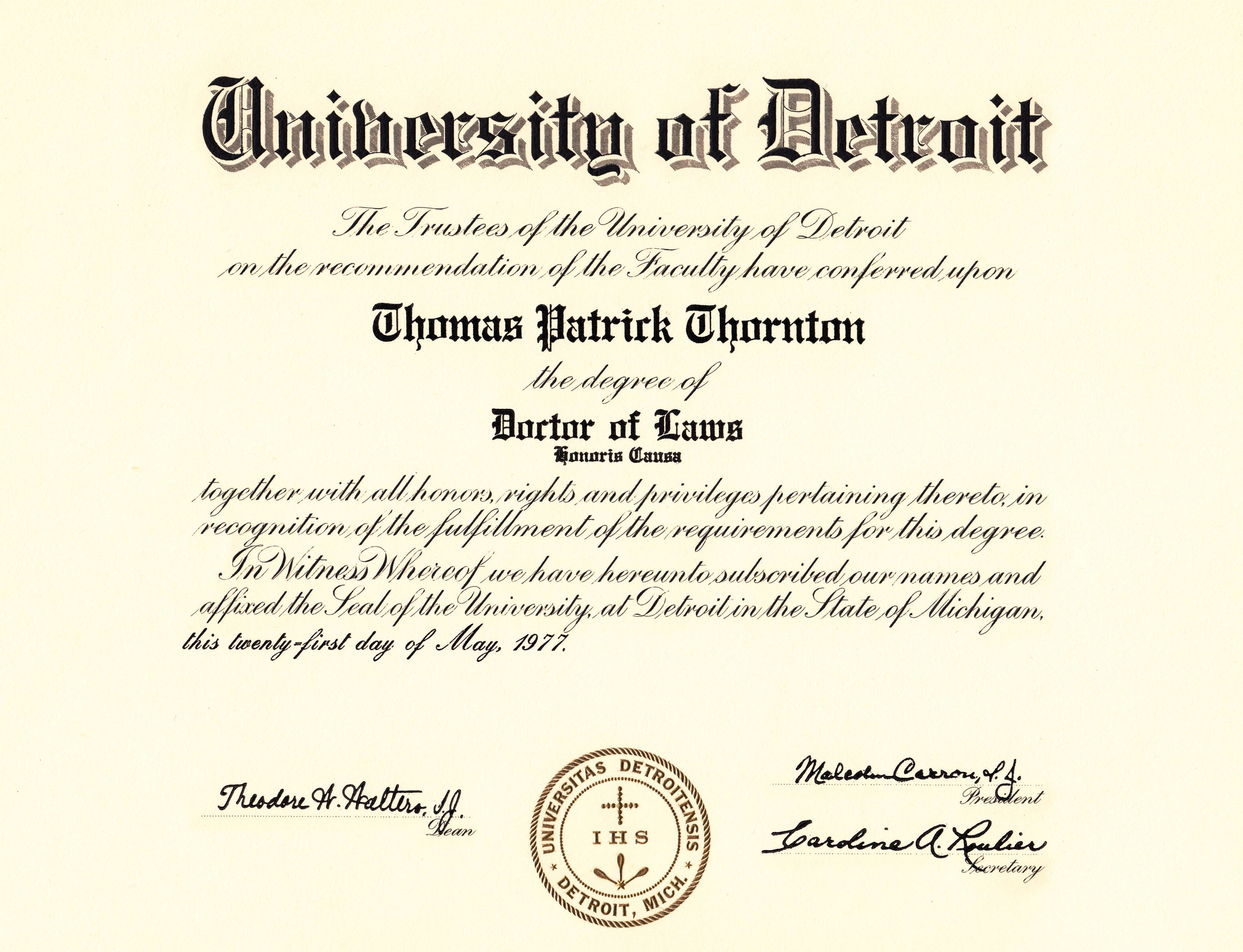
Thomas Thornton was awarded the Honorary Degree of Doctor of Laws from the University of Detroit

Thornton served as a fireman in the United States Navy during World War I. He entered Tufts University in 1919 and so distinguished himself as a fullback on the football team that he was recruited by Fordham University the following year. A year later he was recruited by Syracuse University, and in 1922 he moved west to the University of Detroit to play fullback and quarterback for the Titans. In 1924 he was considered the University of Detroit's finest all time running back. His 1924 team out-scored its opponents by 140 points to 38 points, competing against schools such as Army, Michigan State, Fordham, Boston College, and Tulane.

His tenacity and aggressiveness on the football field earned him the nickname of "Tiger". He also excelled as a swimmer and diver, working summers as a lifeguard at the Belle Isle Bath House. In 1981 he was inducted into the University of Detroit Sports Hall of Fame.

"Tiger" Thornton graduated from the University of Detroit Mercy School of Law in 1926 with a Bachelor of Laws. He was awarded the Honorary Degree of Doctor of Laws from the University of Detroit Mercy on May 21, 1977.

== Career ==
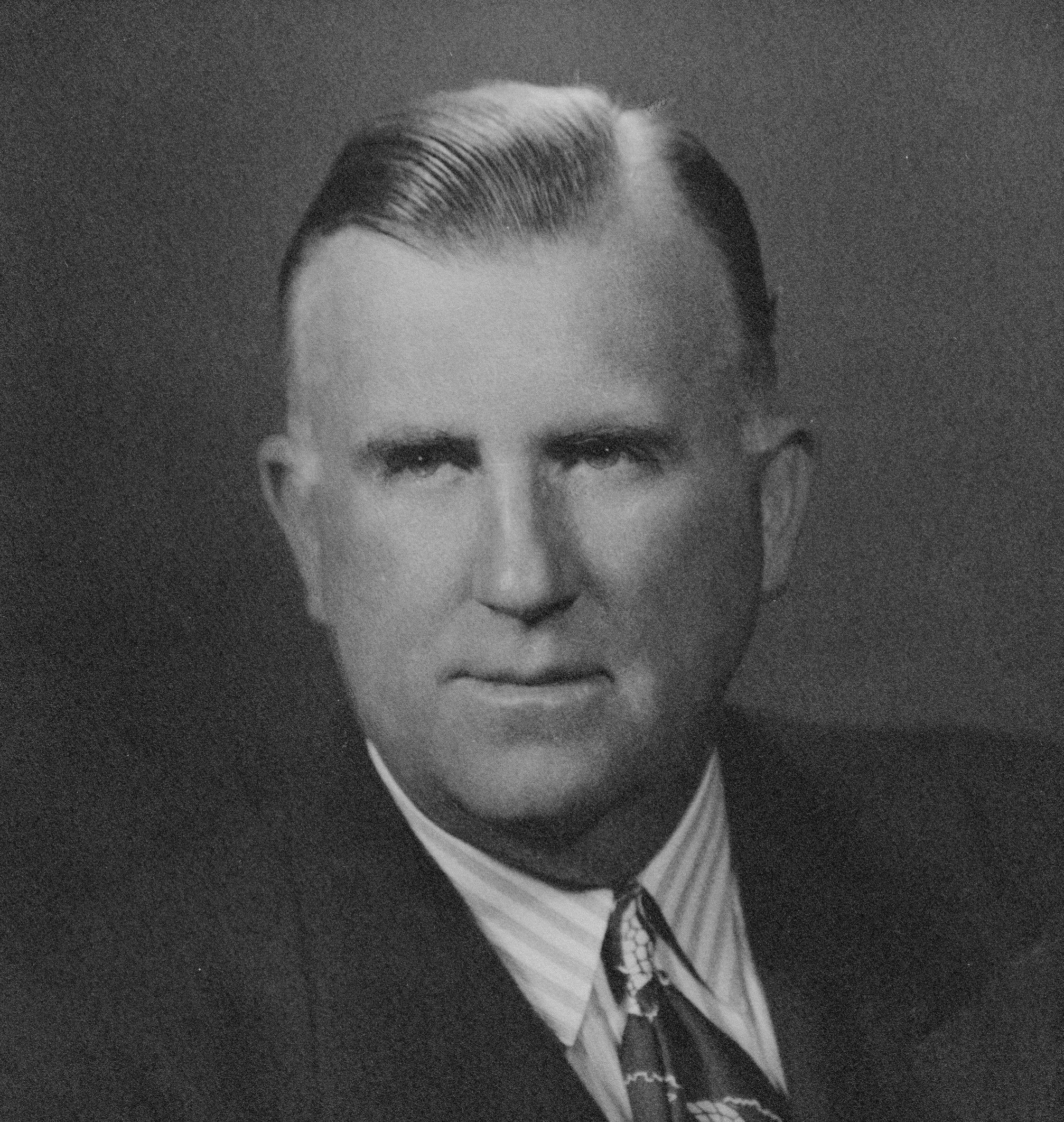
Thomas Thornton when he served as United States Attorney for the Eastern District of Michigan (1947–1949)

After earning his law degree at the University of Detroit in 1926, Thornton spent the summer on Mackinac Island teaching swimming. On returning to Detroit he entered private practice with Tom "Tucker" Kennedy in the Donovan Building, and later partnered with Ed Herlehy in establishing the law firm of Herlehy & Thornton located in Detroit's Hammond Building.

In 1937, on the recommendation of United States Senator Prentiss M. Brown, Thornton was appointed an Assistant United States Attorney for the Eastern District of Michigan. He served as Assistant United States Attorney from 1937 to 1944, and served as Chief Assistant to United States Attorney John C. Lehr from 1944 to 1947. Upon Lehr's retirement in 1947, and on the recommendation of United States Attorney General Tom C. Clark, Thornton was appointed the United States Attorney for the Eastern District of Michigan.

== Federal judicial service ==
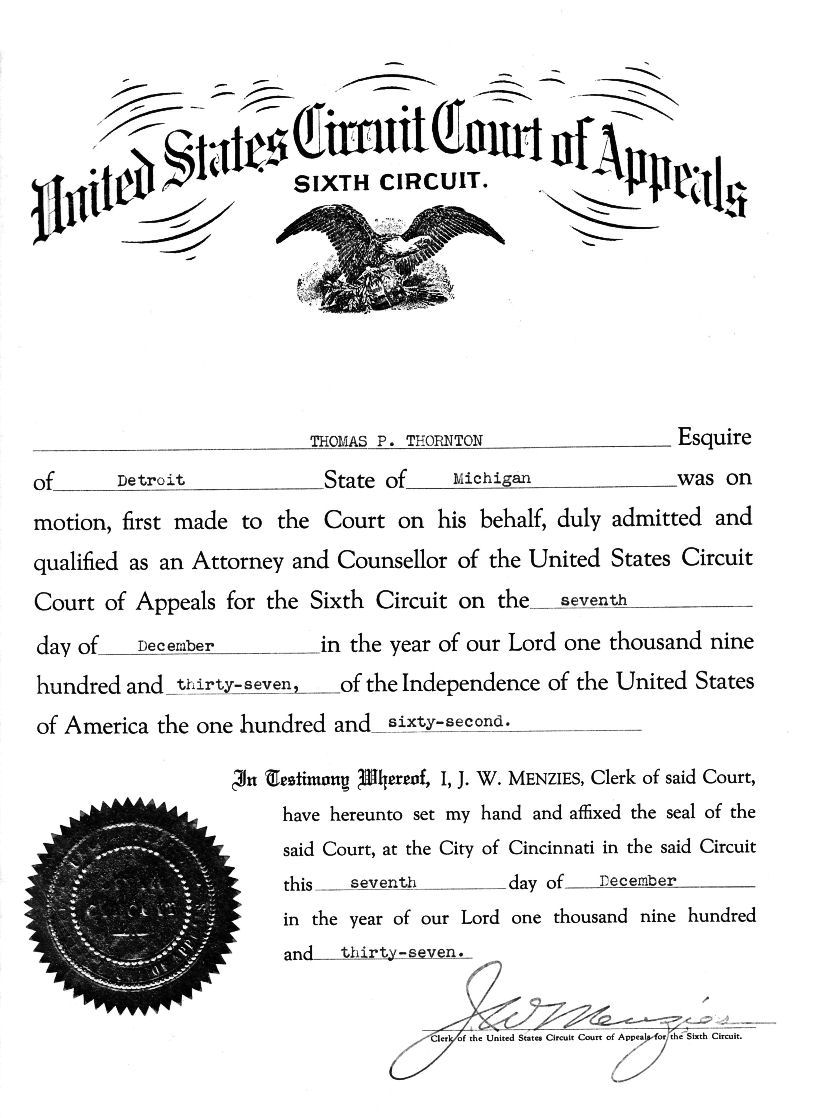
Appointment of Thomas P. Thornton by the Circuit Court of Appeals for the Sixth Circuit on December 7, 1937.

Thornton was nominated by President Harry S. Truman on January 13, 1949, to a seat on the United States District Court for the Eastern District of Michigan vacated by Judge Ernest Aloysius O'Brien. He was confirmed by the United States Senate on January 31, 1949, and received his commission on February 2, 1949. Chief Judge Arthur F. Lederle delivered the oath of office on February 15, 1949. Thornton assumed senior status on February 15, 1966, serving in that status until his death on July 1, 1985. On July 3, 1985, federal courts in Detroit, Ann Arbor, Flint, and Bay City, Michigan were closed in honor of Thornton.

=== Judicial demeanor ===
Thornton was known for his directness, and also for his humor on the bench. Before appointing trustees to manage the bankrupt F.L. Jacobs Company he minced no words in describing the company's prior operations as a "cesspool of violations." On a lighter note when a defendant once said "the Lord told me what to do" Judge Thornton turned to the prosecutor and asked, "Are you sure that you have indicted the right defendant?"

His dedication to his work was recognized in the Congressional Record by Senator Robert P. Griffin in 1975. Senator Griffin noted that Federal judges could retire with full pay at age 70, going on to say about Thornton: "Seven years ago he turned 70 - but rather than take a well deserved retirement, he choose to be a senior judge - and to go on trying cases." Thornton continued trying cases for another 10 years after that was written, until his death on July 1, 1985, at the age of 87.

Judge Cornelia Kennedy reflecting on the career of Judge Thornton said, "He was a really great judge. He was extremely kind to me when I first went on the bench. And though he was serious about his work, I won't ever forget his wonderful sense of humor."

== The Incorporated Society of Irish-American Lawyers ==
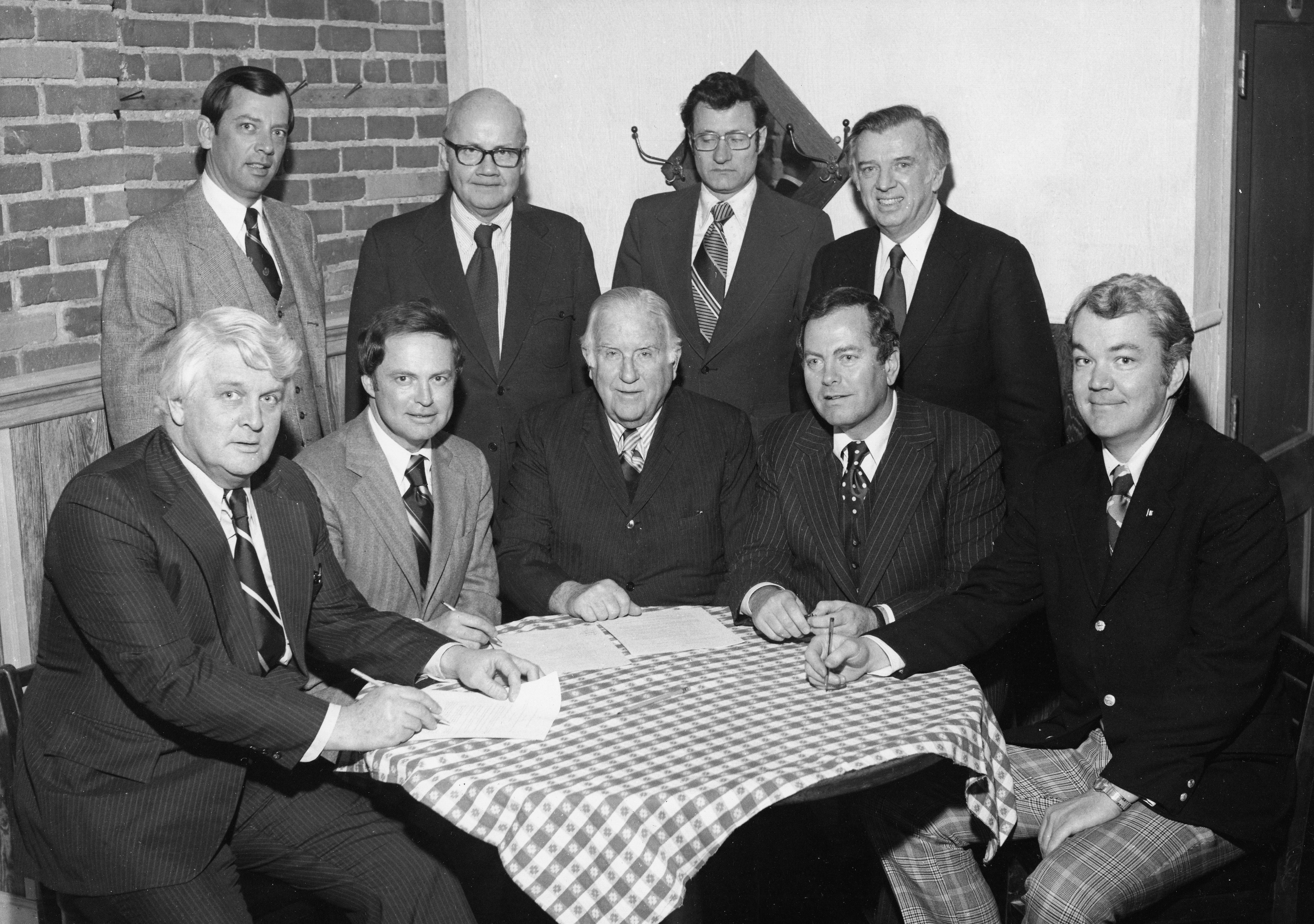
Founders of the Incorporated Society of Irish-American Lawyers (1978). Seated (L to R): Judge Vincent J. Brennan, Peter E. O'Rourke, Judge Thomas P. Thornton (President), Jerome P. Cavanagh, Alvin A. Rutledge. Standing (L to R): Edmund M. Brady Jr., Judge John H. Gillis, Judge Patrick J. Duggan, Judge Joseph B. Sullivan.

Thornton was proud of his Irish heritage, and in 1978 founded the Incorporated Society of Irish-American Lawyers along with Judge Vincent J. Brennan, Peter E. O'Rourke, Jerome P. Cavanagh, Alvin A. Rutledge, Edmund M. Brady Jr., Judge John H. Gillis, Judge Patrick J. Duggan, Judge Joseph B. Sullivan, William L. Cahalan, Alexander B. McGarry, Peter E. Deegan, Paul J. O'Reilly, and Nathan B. Goodnow, Judge Michael J. Kelly, Patrick E. Hackett, and Daniel F. Curran. According to Thornton, the Society was founded "to work for improvements in the administration of justice and advancements in jurisprudence" and further to provide "a forum for an exchange of ideas and information and a setting for sociability." Thornton was elected the first president of the Society.

Just four years after its founding, the Incorporated Society of Irish-American Lawyers had over 600 members. Each year, the Incorporated Society of Irish-American Lawyers awards a scholarship in the name of is founding president, Judge Thomas P. Thornton.

== Personal life ==
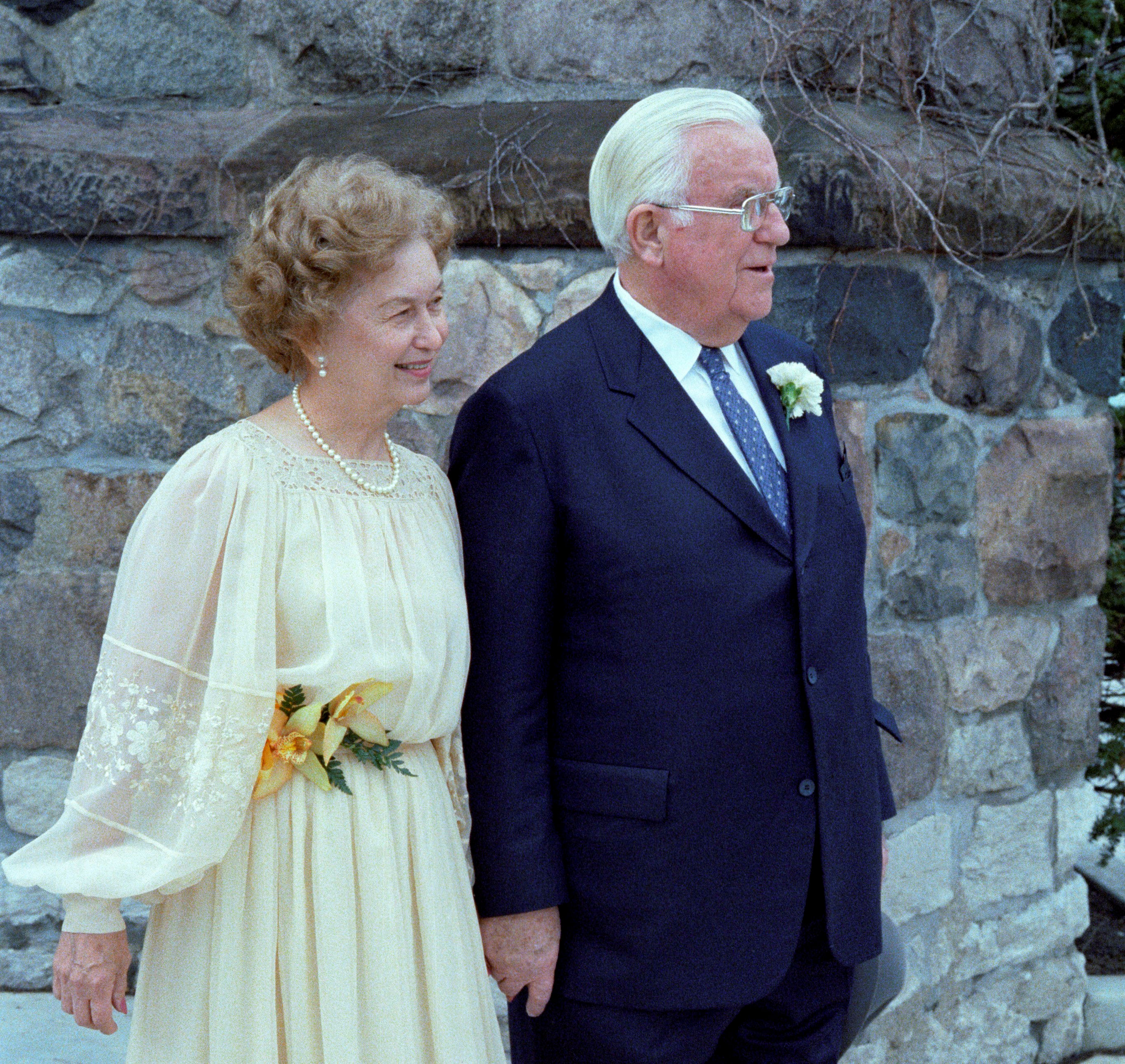
Rose Garland and Thomas Thornton at their wedding (1980)

Thornton was born March 8, 1898, in Boston, Massachusetts. His parents, Patrick Thornton and Sarah O'Maley Thornton, were Irish immigrants. As a young boy Thornton spent all the time he could on the Boston waterfront, and developed a lifelong love of boats and boating.

Thornton married Margaret M. Pressey (née Beaudin) in 1946 and always called her "Honey". They lived in an apartment at 8905 E. Jefferson Avenue in Detroit, but in the summer they would close the apartment and live aboard their cabin cruiser (named "Honey") which they kept at the Detroit Yacht Club on Belle Isle. Thornton loved venturing on the Great Lakes. His favorite port was Mackinac Island where he served for many years as the Commodore of the Mackinac Island Yacht Club. Tom and Margaret Thornton enjoyed 30 years of marriage, until Margaret's death in 1976.

In 1980 Judge Thornton married Rose Garland, the widow of a long-time friend of Thornton's, Harry G. Garland, who died in 1972. They were married at St. Paul's on the Lake, a Roman Catholic church that the judge deeply loved, and had attended for over 40 years. Rose remained his constant companion until his death on July 1, 1985. Thornton was interred at Mount Olivet Cemetery in Detroit, Michigan. In 1987 Rose Garland Thornton was elected to the Grosse Pointe Shores Village Council where she served her community until 2008, and held the position of Mayor Pro-Tem from 2003 to 2008. Rose Garland Thornton died on April 26, 2014.

== Sources ==
Legal offices
Preceded by Ernest Aloysius O'Brien	Judge of the United States District Court for the Eastern District of Michigan; 1949–1966	Succeeded by Damon Keith
