= Damon Keith =

American judge (1922–2019)

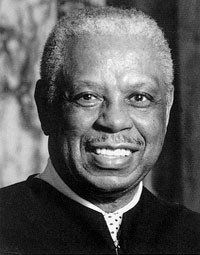

Senior Judge of the United States Court of Appeals for the Sixth Circuit
- In office May 1, 1995 – April 28, 2019

Judge of the United States Court of Appeals for the Sixth Circuit
- In office October 21, 1977 – May 1, 1995
- Appointed by: Jimmy Carter
- Preceded by: Wade H. McCree
- Succeeded by: Richard Allen Griffin

Chief Judge of the United States District Court for the Eastern District of Michigan
- In office December 13, 1975 – November 22, 1977
- Preceded by: Frederick William Kaess
- Succeeded by: Cornelia Groefsema Kennedy

Judge of the United States District Court for the Eastern District of Michigan
- In office October 12, 1967 – November 22, 1977
- Appointed by: Lyndon B. Johnson
- Preceded by: Thomas Patrick Thornton
- Succeeded by: Patricia Boyle

Personal details
- Born: Damon Jerome Keith; July 4, 1922 Detroit, Michigan, U.S.
- Died: April 28, 2019 (aged 96) Detroit, Michigan, U.S.
- Education: West Virginia State University (BA); Howard University (LLB); Wayne State University (LLM)

Damon Jerome Keith (July 4, 1922 – April 28, 2019) was a United States circuit judge of the United States Court of Appeals for the Sixth Circuit and a former United States District Judge of the United States District Court for the Eastern District of Michigan.

== Education and career ==
Keith was born and grew up in Detroit, Michigan, where he graduated from Northwestern High School in 1939. Keith attended West Virginia State College where he was the first in his family to attend college and received a Bachelor of Arts degree in 1943. He served in the United States Army from 1943 to 1946. He then attended Howard University School of Law where he received a Bachelor of Laws in 1949, and Wayne State University Law School where he received a Master of Laws in 1956. He was in the private practice of law in Detroit from 1950 to 1967. He was an attorney in the Office of the Friend of the Court in Detroit from 1951 to 1955. In 1964 Keith was elected co-chair of the Michigan Civil Rights Commission with John Feikens and was a key player in the tumultuous times following the Detroit race riots.

=== Personal ===
Keith married Rachel Boone in 1953 and they had three daughters. Rachel died on January 4, 2007. Keith died on April 28, 2019, at his home in Detroit, at the age of 96. The cause was complications from leukemia and cardiovascular disease.

== Federal judicial service ==
At the suggestion of United States Senator Philip Hart, Keith was nominated by President Lyndon B. Johnson on September 25, 1967, to a seat on the United States District Court for the Eastern District of Michigan vacated by Judge Thomas Patrick Thornton. He was confirmed by the United States Senate on October 12, 1967, and received his commission the same day. He served as Chief Judge from 1975 to 1977. His service was terminated on November 22, 1977, due to his elevation to the Sixth Circuit.

Keith was nominated by President Jimmy Carter on September 28, 1977, to a seat on the United States Court of Appeals for the Sixth Circuit vacated by Judge Wade H. McCree. He was confirmed by the Senate on October 20, 1977, and received his commission on October 21, 1977. He was a member of the Judicial Conference of the United States from 1975 to 1978. He assumed senior status on May 1, 1995 and served until his death in 2019.

== Memberships and honors ==
In 1974, Keith was awarded the Spingarn Medal from the NAACP. Keith is a member of Alpha Phi Alpha fraternity. In 2008, Keith received an honorary doctorate in law (Legum Doctor) from Harvard University.

== Notable cases ==
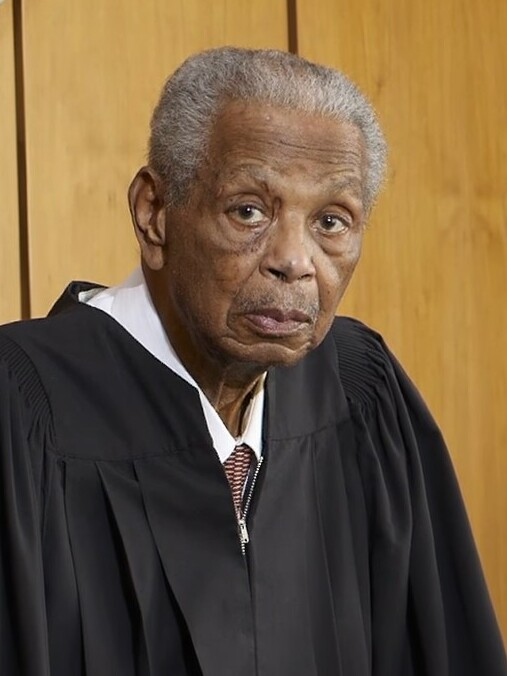
Keith in February 2018

In United States v. Sinclair (1971), Keith famously ruled that Nixon's Attorney General John N. Mitchell had to disclose the transcripts of illegal wiretaps that Mitchell had authorized without first obtaining a search warrant. Keith's decision was upheld by the Court of Appeals for the Sixth Circuit and the U.S. Supreme Court. The Supreme Court's landmark decision in United States v. U.S. District Court (1972) (also known as "the Keith case") contributed in 1978 to president Jimmy Carter signing the Foreign Intelligence Surveillance Act (FISA). That decision is commemorated as a "Michigan Legal Milestone" called "the Uninvited Ear" and erected by the State Bar of Michigan.

In Detroit Free Press v. Ashcroft (2002), Keith, writing for a unanimous panel of the Sixth Circuit Court of Appeals, found that absolute closure of deportation hearings in "special interest" cases was unconstitutional. Under the authorization of Attorney General John Ashcroft, Chief Immigration Judge Michael Creppy told all immigration judges to close to the public and media all hearings associated with immigration that were thought to be related to September 11 investigation. These cases were advised to be handled in seclusion, "closed off from the public", and were held in special interest of national security. Officials terminated public records of the case and removed them from the court's docket. This rule of closed deportation hearings became known as the "Creppy directive". Members of the press and public filed two of the cases challenging the Government's closure of removal proceedings. The plaintiffs in those cases are (1) the Detroit Free Press, Inc. and Herald Co., Inc. (d/b/a the Ann Arbor News) (the "free press plaintiffs") and (2) the Detroit News, Inc., Congressman John Conyers, Jr., and Metro Times, Inc. (the "Detroit News plaintiffs"); the two are collectively the "newspaper plaintiffs". The third case, filed by the ACLU of Michigan representing Rabih Haddad ("Haddad"), one of the men against whom the government had instituted removal proceedings stated that Haddad, a native of Lebanon, resided in Ann Arbor, Michigan, off and on since 1988. Haddadd came to the United States in 1998 on six-month tourist visas. On December 14, 2001, the United States Immigration and Naturalization Service ("INS") took Haddad into custody for overstaying his visa and initiated removal proceedings in Detroit before Immigration Judge Elizabeth Hacker.

== Prominent clerks ==
Keith has been called a father-figure to former Michigan governor Jennifer Granholm, who previously clerked for him. He administered the oath of office to her in both 2003 and 2007. Former law clerks also include:

- Lani Guinier, the first African-American woman to gain tenure at Harvard Law School
- Judge Eric L. Clay, who later served with Judge Keith on the United States Court of Appeals for the Sixth Circuit
- Ronald Machen, the former United States Attorney for the District of Columbia
- David C. Simmons, the current Chief Administrative Law Judge of the District of Columbia Commission on Human Rights, professor of law at Georgetown University Law Center, and former Athletic Director of Howard University
- Constance L. Rice, prominent civil rights activist and co-founder of the Advancement Project
- Rashad Hussain, Deputy Associate Counsel to President Barack Obama, and the U.S. representative to the Organisation of the Islamic Conference
- Jocelyn Benson, Michigan Secretary of State and former dean of Wayne State University Law School
- Daniel Abebe, Dean of Columbia Law School and former Deputy Dean of the University of Chicago Law School and professor of law
- Jonathan J. C. Grey, judge of the United States District Court for the Eastern District of Michigan

== Legacy ==
Keith donated his personal papers to the Walter P. Reuther Library in 1994. The materials come from milestones in his career, including his precedent-setting judicial decisions, his commitment to equality for all in the American justice system, and the many forms of recognition he received for his dedication to civil rights and Detroit.

His estate made a $100,000 bequest to a scholarship fund in his name at West Virginia State University.

"Walk with Me: The Trials of Damon J. Keith," directed by Jesse Nesser, tells the story of Keith's life. It made its world premiere at Michael Moore's Traverse City Film Festival in 2016.

== See also ==
- List of African-American federal judges
- List of African-American jurists
- List of first minority male lawyers and judges in Michigan
- List of United States federal judges by longevity of service

Legal offices
Preceded by Thomas Patrick Thornton	Judge of the United States District Court for the Eastern District of Michigan; 1967–1977	Succeeded by Patricia Boyle
Preceded by Frederick William Kaess	Chief Judge of the United States District Court for the Eastern District of Michigan; 1975–1977	Succeeded by Cornelia Groefsema Kennedy
Preceded by Wade H. McCree	Judge of the United States Court of Appeals for the Sixth Circuit; 1977–1995	Succeeded by Richard Allen Griffin
