= Clifford Patrick O'Sullivan =

American judge (1897–1975)

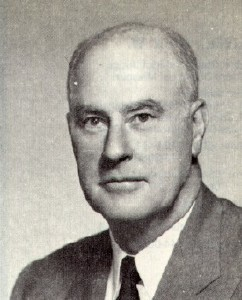

Senior Judge of the United States Court of Appeals for the Sixth Circuit
- In office September 27, 1969 – October 7, 1975

Judge of the United States Court of Appeals for the Sixth Circuit
- In office March 12, 1960 – September 27, 1969
- Appointed by: Dwight D. Eisenhower
- Preceded by: Charles C. Simons
- Succeeded by: William Ernest Miller

Judge of the United States District Court for the Eastern District of Michigan
- In office August 7, 1957 – April 4, 1960
- Appointed by: Dwight D. Eisenhower
- Preceded by: Arthur A. Koscinski
- Succeeded by: John Feikens

Personal details
- Born: Clifford Patrick O'Sullivan; December 8, 1897 Chicago, Illinois
- Died: October 7, 1975 (aged 77)
- Education: Notre Dame Law School (LLB)

Clifford Patrick O'Sullivan (December 8, 1897 – October 7, 1975) was a United States circuit judge of the United States Court of Appeals for the Sixth Circuit and previously was a United States district judge of the United States District Court for the Eastern District of Michigan.

== Education and career ==
Born in Chicago, Illinois, O'Sullivan received a Bachelor of Laws from Notre Dame Law School in 1920. He was in private practice in Port Huron, Michigan from 1920 to 1924, and then in Chicago until 1926, returning to Port Huron until 1957.

== Federal judicial service ==
O'Sullivan was nominated by President Dwight D. Eisenhower on June 6, 1957, to a seat on the United States District Court for the Eastern District of Michigan vacated by Judge Arthur A. Koscinski. He was confirmed by the United States Senate on August 5, 1957, and received his commission on August 7, 1957. His service terminated on April 4, 1960, due to his elevation to the Sixth Circuit.

O'Sullivan was nominated by President Eisenhower on January 14, 1960, to a seat on the United States Court of Appeals for the Sixth Circuit vacated by Judge Charles Casper Simons. He was confirmed by the Senate on March 10, 1960, and received his commission on March 12, 1960. He assumed senior status on September 27, 1969. His service terminated on October 7, 1975, due to his death.

== Sources ==
Legal offices
| Preceded by Arthur A. Koscinski | Judge of the United States District Court for the Eastern District of Michigan; 1957–1960 | Succeeded by John Feikens |
| Preceded by Charles C. Simons | Judge of the United States Court of Appeals for the Sixth Circuit; 1960–1969 | Succeeded by William Ernest Miller |
