= Arthur F. Lederle =

American judge (1887–1972)

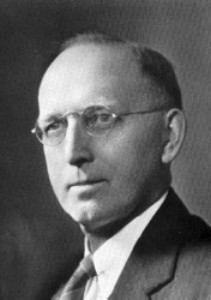

Senior Judge of the United States District Court for the Eastern District of Michigan
- In office July 1, 1960 – April 29, 1972

Chief Judge of the United States District Court for the Eastern District of Michigan
- In office 1948–1959
- Preceded by: Office established
- Succeeded by: Frank Albert Picard

Judge of the United States District Court for the Eastern District of Michigan
- In office March 6, 1936 – July 1, 1960
- Appointed by: Franklin D. Roosevelt
- Preceded by: Charles C. Simons
- Succeeded by: Frederick William Kaess

Personal details
- Born: Arthur F. Lederle; November 25, 1887 Leland, Michigan
- Died: April 29, 1972 (aged 84)
- Education: Eastern Michigan College; Detroit College of Law (LL.B.); University of Detroit School of Law (LL.M.)

Arthur F. Lederle (November 25, 1887 – April 29, 1972) was a United States district judge of the United States District Court for the Eastern District of Michigan.

== Education and career ==
Born in Leland, Michigan, Lederle graduated from Eastern Michigan College in 1909, and received a Bachelor of Laws from Detroit College of Law (now the Michigan State University College of Law) in 1915, a Master of Laws from the University of Detroit School of Law (now the University of Detroit Mercy School of Law) in 1923, and an honorary Legum Doctor (Doctor of Laws) from Wayne State University in 1952. He was an attendance officer for the Board of Education of Detroit, Michigan from 1914 to 1920, and then a supervisor for that city's Compulsory Education Department until 1923. He was an assistant city attorney of City of Detroit, Michigan from 1923 to 1933 and from 1934 to 1936. He was a special assistant state attorney general of Michigan from 1933 to 1934. He was a professor at Wayne State University Law School from 1927 to 1946.

== Federal judicial service ==
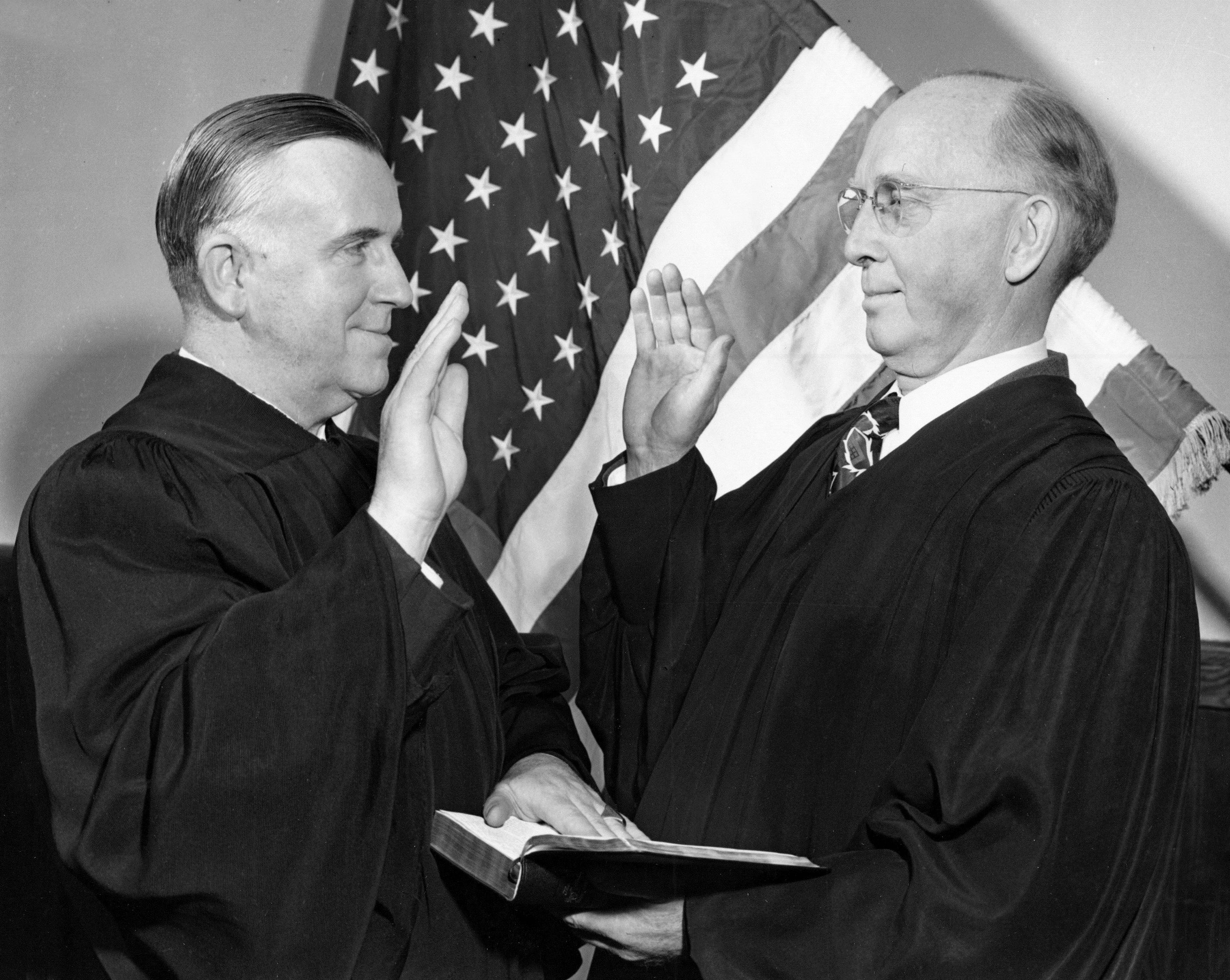
Chief Judge Arthur F. Lederle (right) swearing-in Judge Thomas P. Thornton to the United States District Court for the Eastern District of Michigan in 1949.

On February 20, 1936, Lederle was nominated by President Franklin D. Roosevelt to a seat on the United States District Court for the Eastern District of Michigan vacated by Judge Charles Casper Simons. Lederle was confirmed by the United States Senate on March 3, 1936, and received his commission on March 6, 1936. He served as Chief Judge from 1948 to 1959, assuming senior status on July 1, 1960. He served in that capacity until his death on April 29, 1972.

== Endowed scholarship ==
The Detroit College of Law would name a student each year as the "Arthur F. Lederle scholar." Wayne State University has an endowed scholarship that is named in his honor and awarded to first year students.

== Papers ==
The collected papers of Judge Lederle, consisting of 3 1/2 feet of documents, are held at the Walter P. Reuther Library at Wayne State.

== Sources ==
Legal offices
| Preceded by Charles C. Simons | Judge of the United States District Court for the Eastern District of Michigan; 1936–1960 | Succeeded by Frederick William Kaess |
| Preceded by Office established | Chief Judge of the United States District Court for the Eastern District of Michigan; 1948–1959 | Succeeded by Frank Albert Picard |
