= R. James Harvey =

American judge and politician (1922–2019)

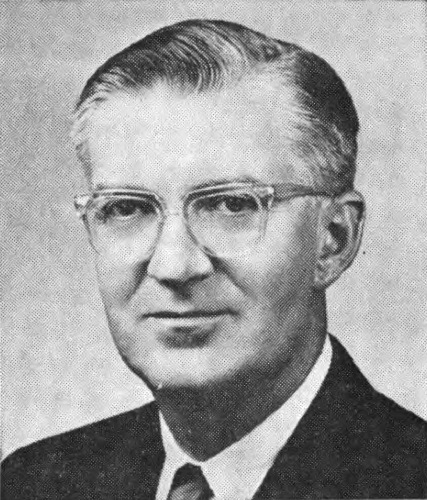

Senior Judge of the United States District Court for the Eastern District of Michigan
- In office March 31, 1984 – July 20, 2019

Judge of the United States District Court for the Eastern District of Michigan
- In office December 19, 1973 – March 31, 1984
- Appointed by: Richard Nixon
- Preceded by: Ralph M. Freeman
- Succeeded by: Richard Fred Suhrheinrich

Member of the U.S. House of Representatives from Michigan's 8th district
- In office January 3, 1961 – January 31, 1974
- Preceded by: Alvin M. Bentley
- Succeeded by: Bob Traxler

Mayor of Saginaw
- In office April 8, 1957 – April 13, 1959
- Preceded by: Maurice E. Brown
- Succeeded by: R. Dewey Stearns

Personal details
- Born: Russell James Harvey; July 4, 1922 Iron Mountain, Michigan, U.S.
- Died: July 20, 2019 (aged 97) Naples, Florida, U.S.
- Party: Republican
- Education: University of Michigan Law School (J.D.)

Russell James Harvey (July 4, 1922 – July 20, 2019) usually known as James Harvey, was a United States representative from Michigan and an inactive senior United States district judge of the United States District Court for the Eastern District of Michigan.

== Education and career ==
Harvey was born in Iron Mountain; his mother and paternal grandparents were immigrants from England. He enrolled in the University of Michigan in 1940, but interrupted his studies in 1942 to serve in the United States Army Air Forces for three years. He earned a Juris Doctor from the University of Michigan Law School in 1948, was admitted to the bar, and commenced the practice of law in Saginaw, Michigan in 1949. He was assistant city attorney from 1949 to 1953, a city councilman and a member of the Saginaw County board of supervisors from 1955 to 1957. He was mayor of Saginaw from 1957 to 1959.

== Congressional service ==
In 1960, with the help of campaign manager Emil Lockwood, Harvey was elected as a Republican from Michigan's 8th congressional district to the 87th United States Congress. Harvey voted in favor of the Civil Rights Acts of 1964, and 1968, as well as the 24th Amendment to the U.S. Constitution and the Voting Rights Act of 1965. He was subsequently re-elected to the six succeeding Congresses, serving from January 3, 1961 to January 31, 1974. He resigned on January 31, 1974.

== Federal judicial service ==
Harvey's grave at Glendale Cemetery

Harvey was nominated by President Richard Nixon on December 5, 1973, to a seat on the United States District Court for the Eastern District of Michigan vacated by Judge Ralph M. Freeman. He was confirmed by the United States Senate on December 13, 1973, and received his commission on December 19, 1973. He assumed senior status due to a certified disability on March 31, 1984. He took inactive senior status in 2002.

Harvey died in Naples, Florida on July 20, 2019, aged 97. He was buried at Glendale Cemetery in Okemos, Michigan.

== See also ==
- List of United States federal judges by longevity of service

== Sources ==
- United States Congress. "R. James Harvey (id: H000306)". Biographical Directory of the United States Congress.
- "R. James Harvey". The Political Graveyard.
- "Biography R. James Harvey". Sixth Circuit Court of Appeals. Archived from the original on May 12, 2009.

U.S. House of Representatives
Preceded by Alvin M. Bentley	Member of the U.S. House of Representatives from Michigan's 8th district January 3, 1961 – January 31, 1974	Succeeded by Bob Traxler
Political offices
Preceded by Maurice E. Brown	Mayor of Saginaw, Michigan; April 8, 1957 – April 13, 1959	Succeeded by R. Dewey Stearns
Legal offices
Preceded by Ralph M. Freeman	Judge of the United States District Court for the Eastern District of Michigan; 1974–1984	Succeeded by Richard Fred Suhrheinrich
