= Ralph M. Freeman =

American judge (1902–1990)

Ralph McKenzie Freeman
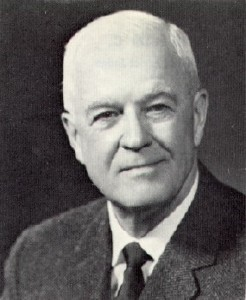

Senior Judge of the United States District Court for the Eastern District of Michigan
- In office July 1, 1973 – March 29, 1990

Chief Judge of the United States District Court for the Eastern District of Michigan
- In office February 18, 1967 – May 4, 1972
- Preceded by: Theodore Levin
- Succeeded by: Frederick William Kaess

Judge of the United States District Court for the Eastern District of Michigan
- In office June 10, 1954 – July 1, 1973
- Appointed by: Dwight D. Eisenhower
- Preceded by: Seat established by 68 Stat. 8
- Succeeded by: R. James Harvey

Personal details
- Born: Ralph McKenzie Freeman; May 5, 1902 Flushing, Michigan
- Died: March 29, 1990 (aged 87) Royal Oak, Michigan
- Resting place: Sunset Hill Cemetery; Flint, Michigan
- Education: University of Michigan Law School (LL.B.)

Ralph McKenzie Freeman (May 5, 1902 – March 29, 1990) was a United States district judge of the United States District Court for the Eastern District of Michigan.

== Education and career ==
Born on May 5, 1902, in Flushing, Michigan, Freeman received a Bachelor of Laws in 1926 from University of Michigan Law School. He entered private practice in Flint, Michigan from 1926 to 1927 and again from 1933 to 1954. He was an assistant prosecutor in Genesee County, Michigan from 1928 to 1930 and prosecutor from 1931 to 1932.

=== Other service ===
Freeman was elected to the Flint Board of Education in 1935, and served until 1949. During the course of that service, he served in the capacity of Secretary, as Vice President and ultimately as President of the Board for four years. His service was recognized by the Flint Board of Education when they named a new school in Flint, the Ralph M. Freeman Elementary School.

== Federal judicial service ==
Freeman was nominated by President Dwight D. Eisenhower on May 10, 1954, to the United States District Court for the Eastern District of Michigan, to a new seat authorized by 68 Stat. 8. He was confirmed by the United States Senate on June 8, 1954, and received his commission on June 10, 1954. He took the oath and entered on duty on June 29, 1954. He served as a member of the Judicial Conference of the United States from 1963 to 1966 and as Chief Judge from February 18, 1967 to May 4, 1972. He assumed senior status on July 1, 1973. His service terminated on March 29, 1990, due to his death in Royal Oak, Michigan.

== Personal and death ==
On August 13, 1938, Freeman married Emmalyn Ellis; they had no children. Freeman died suddenly on March 29, 1990, after returning from a judicial conference at Hilton Head, South Carolina. He was interred at Sunset Hill Cemetery in Flint after a graveside service.

Legal offices
Preceded by Seat established by 68 Stat. 8	Judge of the United States District Court for the Eastern District of Michigan; 1954–1973	Succeeded by R. James Harvey
Preceded by Theodore Levin	Chief Judge of the United States District Court for the Eastern District of Michigan; 1967–1972	Succeeded by Frederick William Kaess
