= Eric L. Clay =

American judge (born 1948)

Eric Clay
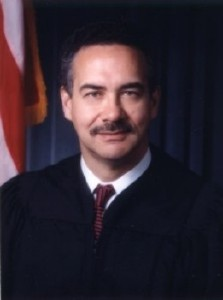

Judge of the United States Court of Appeals for the Sixth Circuit
- Incumbent
- Assumed office August 1, 1997
- Appointed by: Bill Clinton
- Preceded by: Ralph B. Guy Jr.

Personal details
- Born: Eric Lee Clay; January 18, 1948 (age 77) Durham, North Carolina, U.S.
- Education: University of North Carolina, Chapel Hill (BA); Yale University (JD)

Eric Lee Clay (born January 18, 1948) is a United States circuit judge of the United States Court of Appeals for the Sixth Circuit.

== Early life, education and legal training ==
Born in Durham, North Carolina, Clay earned a Bachelor of Arts degree Phi Beta Kappa from the University of North Carolina in 1969 and a Juris Doctor in 1972 from Yale Law School, where he was a classmate of future president Bill Clinton and Hillary Clinton. Clay clerked for United States District Judge Damon Keith from June 1972 until June 1973.

== Professional career ==
Clay worked as a lawyer in private practice in Detroit, Michigan from 1973 until 1997. He was a partner and co-founder of Lewis, White & Clay, which was considered to be one of the nation's leading black-owned law firms. In addition, he also served on the executive board of the Clinton-Gore finance committee for Michigan in 1992. David Baker Lewis, Clay's law partner, was the husband of Kathleen McCree Lewis, a Clinton nominee to the Sixth Circuit who was never confirmed.

== Federal judicial service ==
On March 6, 1996, President Bill Clinton nominated Clay to a seat on the United States Court of Appeals for the Sixth Circuit vacated by Judge Ralph B. Guy Jr. The United States Senate Judiciary Committee approved Clay's nomination in 1996, but the United States Senate adjourned in 1996 prior to the presidential election without taking a full confirmation vote. Clinton renominated Clay on January 7, 1997. Clay was unanimously confirmed by the full Senate in a voice vote on July 31, 1997, and received his commission on August 1, 1997.

== See also ==
- List of African-American federal judges
- List of African-American jurists

Legal offices
Preceded by Ralph B. Guy Jr.	Judge of the United States Court of Appeals for the Sixth Circuit; 1997–present	Incumbent
