= Richard Fred Suhrheinrich =

American judge (born 1936)

Richard Suhrheinrich

Senior Judge of the United States Court of Appeals for the Sixth Circuit
- Incumbent
- Assumed office August 15, 2001

Judge of the United States Court of Appeals for the Sixth Circuit
- In office July 10, 1990 – August 15, 2001
- Appointed by: George H. W. Bush
- Preceded by: Albert J. Engel Jr.
- Succeeded by: David McKeague

Judge of the United States District Court for the Eastern District of Michigan
- In office October 4, 1984 – July 13, 1990
- Appointed by: Ronald Reagan
- Preceded by: R. James Harvey
- Succeeded by: Nancy Garlock Edmunds

Personal details
- Born: Richard Fred Suhrheinrich; August 15, 1936 (age 90) Lincoln City, Indiana, U.S.
- Education: Wayne State University (BS); Michigan State University (JD); University of Virginia (LLM)

Richard Fred Suhrheinrich (born August 15, 1936) is a Senior United States circuit judge of the United States Court of Appeals for the Sixth Circuit serving in Lansing, Michigan. He had been a United States district judge of the United States District Court for the Eastern District of Michigan.

== Education and career ==
Born in Lincoln City, Indiana, Suhrheinrich earned his Bachelor of Science degree in 1960 from Wayne State University, his Juris Doctor with honors in 1963 from the Detroit College of Law (now Michigan State University College of Law) and his Master of Laws in 1990 from the University of Virginia School of Law. Suhrheinrich was an assistant prosecutor for Macomb County, Michigan, in 1967 and was an associate professor of law at the Detroit College of Law from 1975 to 1985. He co-founded, with Richard Kitch, the law firm Kitch & Suhrheinrich. The firm originally specialized in medical malpractice defense. Now the Kitch firm, the firm has since grown into a full-service law firm with seven offices throughout Michigan, Ohio, and Illinois.

Currently, Suhrheinrich is a Distinguished Jurist & Professor at the Western Michigan University Cooley Law School teaching various legal courses.

== Federal judicial service ==
Suhrheinrich was nominated by President Ronald Reagan on September 6, 1984, to a seat on the United States District Court for the Eastern District of Michigan vacated by Judge R. James Harvey. He was confirmed by the United States Senate on October 3, 1984, and received commission on October 4, 1984. His service terminated on July 13, 1990, due to elevation to the court of appeals.

Suhrheinrich was nominated by President George H. W. Bush on April 18, 1990, to a seat on the United States Court of Appeals for the Sixth Circuit vacated by Judge Albert J. Engel Jr. He was confirmed by the Senate on June 28, 1990, and received commission on July 10, 1990. He assumed senior status on August 15, 2001, and was succeeded by Judge David McKeague. He retired in 2025.

== Notable case ==
He made national news on December 22, 2005, when he authored ACLU v. Mercer County, in which an appeals panel of the Sixth Circuit unanimously upheld the continued display of the Ten Commandments in a Kentucky courthouse.

In his opinion, Suhrheinrich stated that the United States Constitution does not demand "a wall of separation between church and state," denying a claim by the ACLU. In addition, he criticized the ACLU's "repeated references to the 'separation of church and state'", stating that "this extra-constitutional construct has grown tiresome." Judge Alice M. Batchelder joined in the opinion, while District Judge Walter Herbert Rice merely concurred in the decision but not the opinion.

Legal offices
Preceded by R. James Harvey	Judge of the United States District Court for the Eastern District of Michigan; 1984–1990	Succeeded by Nancy Garlock Edmunds
Preceded by Albert J. Engel Jr.	Judge of the United States Court of Appeals for the Sixth Circuit; 1990–2001	Succeeded by David McKeague
