= Sean Cox =

American judge (born 1957)

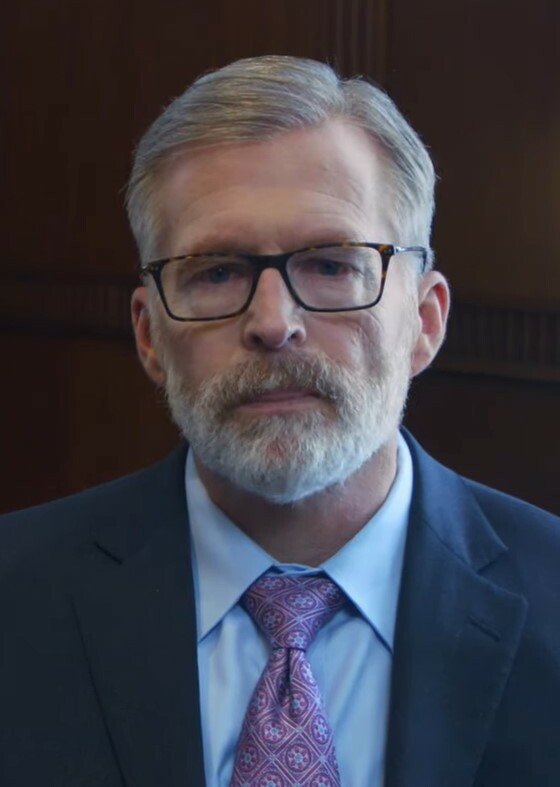
- Cox in 2022

Chief Judge of the United States District Court for the Eastern District of Michigan
- In office February 21, 2022 – July 28, 2025
- Preceded by: Denise Page Hood
- Succeeded by: Stephen Murphy III

Judge of the United States District Court for the Eastern District of Michigan
- In office June 12, 2006 – July 28, 2025
- Appointed by: George W. Bush
- Preceded by: Lawrence Paul Zatkoff
- Succeeded by: Michael C. Martin

Personal details
- Born: Sean Francis Cox; September 24, 1957 (age 68) Detroit, Michigan, U.S.
- Education: University of Michigan (BGS); Michigan State University (JD)

Sean Francis Cox (born September 24, 1957) is an American lawyer who served as a United States district judge of the United States District Court for the Eastern District of Michigan from 2006 to 2025.

== Education and career ==
Cox was born in Detroit. He received a Bachelor of General Studies degree from the University of Michigan in 1979 and his Juris Doctor from the Detroit College of Law (now the Michigan State University College of Law) in 1983. Prior to joining the federal bench, Cox was a trial judge in Michigan for the Wayne County Circuit Court. He was appointed by Michigan Governor John Engler in 1996. Before that, Cox was in private practice in Michigan from 1983 to 1996.

=== Federal judicial service ===
President George W. Bush nominated Cox to the United States District Court for the Eastern District of Michigan on September 10, 2004, and renominated him on February 4, 2005, to fill a vacancy left by Judge Lawrence Paul Zatkoff. Due to the initial opposition of Michigan Senators Carl Levin and Debbie Stabenow, Cox's nomination was not voted on until June 8, 2006, when he was confirmed by voice vote. He received his commission on June 12, 2006. He became chief judge on February 21, 2022, serving until his retirement on July 27, 2025.

On February 28, 2025, it was announced that Cox would retire from the court to work on mediation, facilitation, and arbitration for JAMS. Cox retired on July 28, 2025.

=== Notable cases ===
In 2009, Cox presided over the case of Canadian citizens Timothy McGuire and James Ryan, who sued the Royal Oak, Michigan police department for false arrest after they witnessed but did not participate in an assault of a fellow passenger on a bus they were riding on.

Legal offices
Preceded by Lawrence Paul Zatkoff	Judge of the United States District Court for the Eastern District of Michigan; 2006–2025	Succeeded by Michael C. Martin
Preceded by Denise Page Hood	Chief Judge of the United States District Court for the Eastern District of Michigan; 2022–2025	Succeeded by Stephen Murphy III
