= Frederick William Kaess =

American judge (1910–1979)

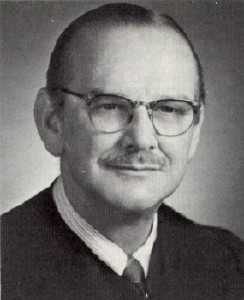

Senior Judge of the United States District Court for the Eastern District of Michigan
- In office December 13, 1975 – March 30, 1979

Chief Judge of the United States District Court for the Eastern District of Michigan
- In office 1972–1975
- Preceded by: Ralph M. Freeman
- Succeeded by: Damon Keith

Judge of the United States District Court for the Eastern District of Michigan
- In office July 6, 1960 – December 13, 1975
- Appointed by: Dwight D. Eisenhower
- Preceded by: Arthur F. Lederle
- Succeeded by: Ralph B. Guy Jr.

Personal details
- Born: Frederick William Kaess; December 1, 1910 Detroit, Michigan
- Died: March 30, 1979 (aged 68)
- Education: Detroit College of Law (LL.B.)

Frederick William Kaess (December 1, 1910 – March 30, 1979) was a United States district judge of the United States District Court for the Eastern District of Michigan.

== Education and career ==
Kaess was born in Detroit, Michigan on December 1, 1910, the son of Frederick Charles Kaess Jr. and Dorothy Koch Kaess. He received his earliest education in the public schools of Detroit, graduated from Lake Shore High School of suburban St. Clair Shores, Michigan, and received a Bachelor of Laws from Detroit College of Law (now Michigan State University College of Law) in 1932. He was a municipal judge for St. Clair Shores, Michigan from 1932 to 1933. He was an attorney and claims manager for the Michigan Mutual Liability Company from 1933 to 1945. He was a deputy commissioner for the Workmen's Compensation Commission in Lansing, Michigan from 1939 to 1940. He was in private practice in Detroit from 1945 to 1953. He was the United States Attorney for the Eastern District of Michigan from 1953 to 1960.

== Federal judicial service ==
On June 10, 1960, Kaess was nominated by President Dwight D. Eisenhower to a seat on the United States District Court for the Eastern District of Michigan vacated by Judge Arthur F. Lederle. Kaess was confirmed by the United States Senate on July 2, 1960, and received his commission on July 6, 1960. He served as Chief Judge from 1972 to 1975, assuming senior status on December 13, 1975 and serving in that capacity until his death on March 30, 1979.

== Sources ==
Legal offices
Preceded by Arthur F. Lederle	Judge of the United States District Court for the Eastern District of Michigan; 1960–1975	Succeeded by Ralph B. Guy Jr.
Preceded by Ralph M. Freeman	Chief Judge of the United States District Court for the Eastern District of Michigan; 1972–1975	Succeeded by Damon Keith
