= D. Augustus Straker =

American lawyer and jurist

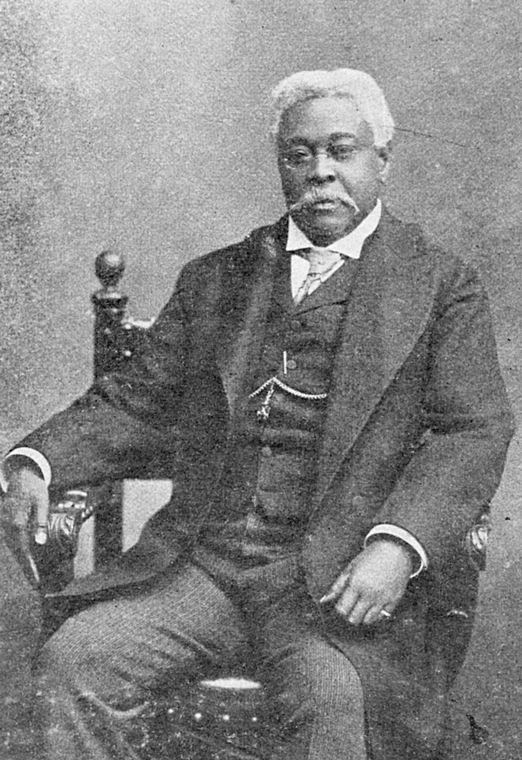
David Augustus Straker, 1902.

David Augustus Straker (1842 – February 14, 1908) was a Barbadian teacher, lawyer, and jurist. He won elections to the South Carolina legislature but was denied his seat on multiple occasions.

== Early life and education ==
David Augustus Straker was born in Bridgetown, Barbados in 1842 to John and Margaret Straker. His father died when he was eleven months old and he was raised by his mother. He attended the Dame School until he was eleven, then had a private tutor for two years before entering the Central Public School of the Island led by Robert P. Elliott. He started to learn the tailor's trade, but did not enjoy it and withdrew, instead taking instruction in French and Latin under Rev. Joseph N. Durant and in education by R. R. Rawle at Codrington College. At the age of seventeen he was appointed principal of St. Mary's School and worked as a school teacher at St. Amis' School and St. Giles' School.

In 1866, Rev. Benjamin B. Smith, Episcopal Bishop of the Protestant Church of America, asked Rawle if there were any black people who would agree to emigrate to the United States to teach former slaves, and Straker volunteered. Straker began teaching in Louisville, Kentucky in schools set up by the Episcopal Church and the Freedmen's Bureau. He also began to prepare to become a minister, but did not pursue that career. In 1870, Straker was induced to enroll in Howard University Law School by John M. Langston, and he graduated in June 1871. While a student he worked as stenographer for Freedmen's Bureau head Oliver O. Howard. He also took a position as teacher at Howard in the Normal and Preparatory Department. He held a LL. B. degree from Howard University and a LL. D. from Selma University.

In September 1871 he married Ann Carey, daughter of Thomas and Julia Carey, in Detroit, Michigan.

== Political career ==
In 1871 he was appointed clerk in the auditor's office of the United States Treasury Department in Washington, DC where he remained until 1875. He then took a position as Inspector of Customs at the port of Charleston, South Carolina. In 1876 he began practicing law in Orangeburg County, South Carolina, and was elected to the South Carolina House of Representatives as a Republican. In that election, incumbent Republican governor Daniel Henry Chamberlain and Democratic candidate Wade Hampton III both claimed victory and established separate governments. Eventually Chamberlain conceded and numerous Republican legislators including Straker were removed from the government. Straker was reelected in 1877 and 1878, but denied his seat both years.

In 1878 he formed a law partnership with Robert B. Elliott and T. McCants Stewart. Elliot was an agent of the Treasury Department and Straker was appointed special Inspector of Customs in Elliott's office. His political career would diminish, but in 1884 he was nominated Lieutenant-Governor at the Republican State Convention, but the ticket was abandoned. He was highly respected and befriended numerous important Republicans. He, George T. Downing, and James Wormley were the sole three black men who were with Charles Sumner at Sumner's death in 1874.

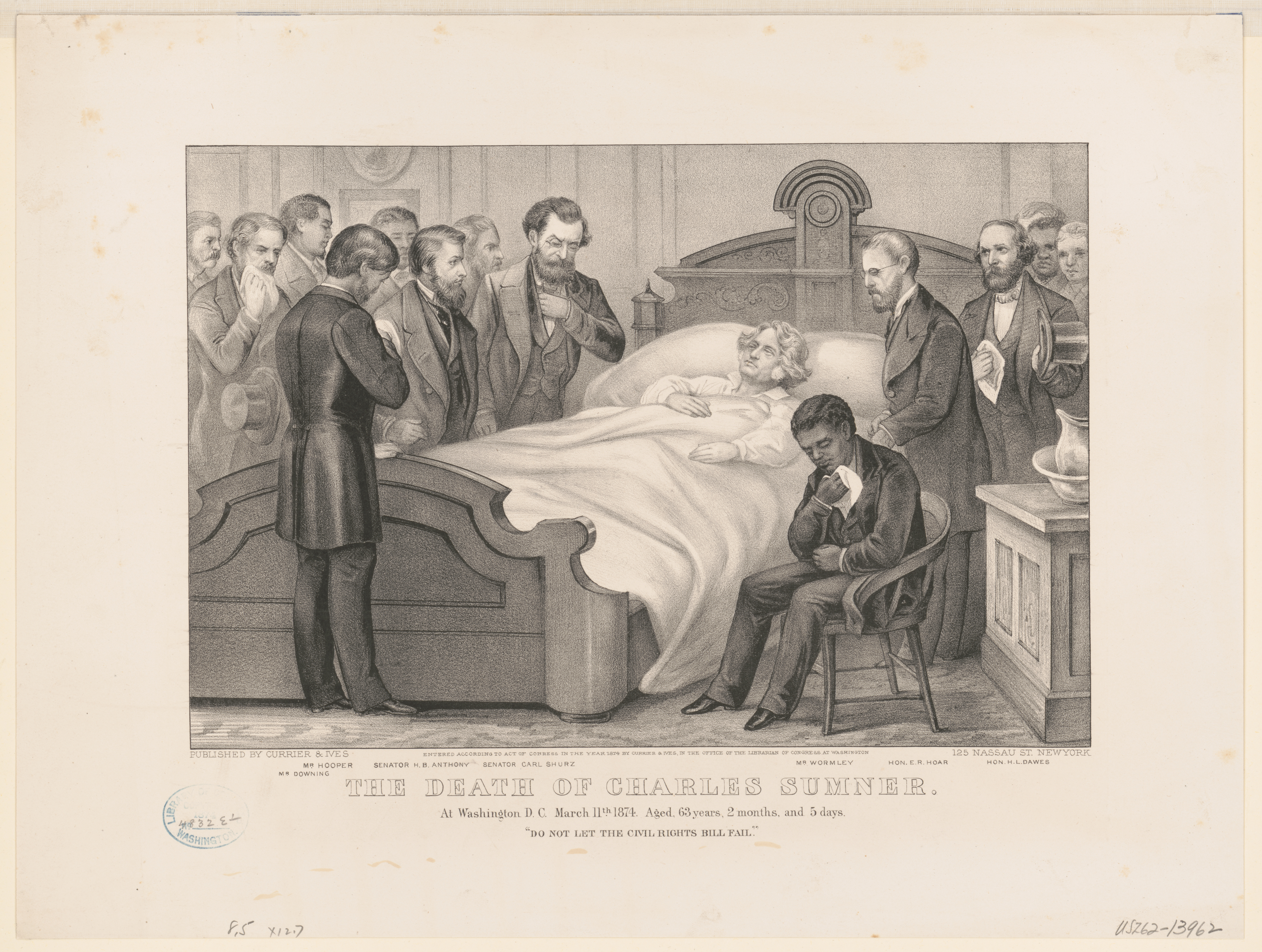
Death of Charles Sumner by Currier & Ives.

== Law career ==
In 1882, Straker became dean and law professor at Allen University in Columbia, South Carolina. He had become a well respected lawyer and had appeared in several important cases. A particular case was the defense of James Coleman, who was accused of Murder. R. G. Bonham represented the state, and Straker and Coleman won the case with an insanity plea. He also won two cases against the Bethel A.M.E. church, one regarding a property issue, and the other in support of the minister in dispute with a part of the congregation. In his law work, he worked with J. W. Morris, who would be elected president of Allen University in 1885.

Straker also took part in numerous educational conventions and played an important role in the colored department of the 1884 World Cotton Centennial in New Orleans. He also was a noted speaker and wrote a number of articles for religious journals, particularly the A. M. E. Review.

=== Michigan ===
In 1885 he visited Detroit, Michigan where he was well received and gave a number of speeches. He later moved to Detroit, Michigan, where he became the first black lawyer to appear before the Michigan Supreme Court. In 1890, in the case Ferguson v. Gies, Straker argued that the doctrine of "separate but equal" was unconstitutional according to Michigan law. In the 1890s, Straker worked with Robert Pelham Jr. to create branches of the National Afro-American League in Michigan and the pair were active, in part through the league, in supporting blacks in legal trouble.

Straker was one of the 56 prominent Detroit residents invited to contribute a letter to the Detroit Century Box, a time capsule organized by then-mayor William C. Maybury and sealed on December 31, 1900. It was opened on December 31, 2000.

== See also ==
- List of first minority male lawyers and judges in Michigan
