= Ralph B. Guy Jr. =

American judge (1929–2026)

Ralph Guy

Presiding Judge of the United States Foreign Intelligence Surveillance Court of Review
- In office May 19, 2001 – May 19, 2005
- Appointed by: William Rehnquist
- Preceded by: Paul Hitch Roney
- Succeeded by: Edward Leavy

Judge of the United States Foreign Intelligence Surveillance Court of Review
- In office October 8, 1998 – May 19, 2005
- Appointed by: William Rehnquist
- Preceded by: Bobby Baldock
- Succeeded by: Bruce M. Selya

Judge of the United States Court of Appeals for the Sixth Circuit
- In office October 17, 1985 – September 1, 1994
- Appointed by: Ronald Reagan
- Preceded by: Seat established
- Succeeded by: Eric L. Clay

Senior Judge of the United States Court of Appeals for the Sixth Circuit
- In office September 1, 1994 – April 20, 2026

Judge of the United States District Court for the Eastern District of Michigan
- In office May 12, 1976 – October 17, 1985
- Appointed by: Gerald Ford
- Preceded by: Frederick William Kaess
- Succeeded by: Lawrence Paul Zatkoff

Personal details
- Born: August 30, 1929 Detroit, Michigan, U.S.
- Died: April 20, 2026 (aged 96)
- Education: University of Michigan (BA, JD)

Ralph Bright Guy Jr. (August 30, 1929 – April 20, 2026) was an American jurist who served as a judge of the United States District Court for the Eastern District of Michigan and the United States Court of Appeals for the Sixth Circuit.

== Life and career ==
Born on August 30, 1929, in Detroit, Michigan, Guy received an Artium Baccalaureus degree from the University of Michigan in 1951 and a Juris Doctor from the University of Michigan Law School in 1953. He was in private practice in Dearborn, Michigan from 1954 to 1955. He was an assistant corporation counsel for the City of Dearborn from 1955 to 1958, and corporation counsel for that city until 1968. He was then a Chief Assistant United States Attorney for the Eastern District of Michigan until 1970, going on to serve as the United States Attorney for the Eastern District of Michigan until 1976.

On April 26, 1976, Guy was nominated by President Gerald Ford to a seat on the United States District Court for the Eastern District of Michigan vacated by Judge Frederick William Kaess. Guy was confirmed by the United States Senate on May 11, 1976, and received his commission the following day. His service terminated on October 17, 1985, due to elevation to the Sixth Circuit. On July 23, 1985, President Ronald Reagan nominated Guy to a new seat on the United States Court of Appeals for the Sixth Circuit created by 98 Stat. 333. He was again confirmed by the Senate on October 16, 1985, and received his commission the following day. He assumed senior status on September 1, 1994.

Guy died on April 20, 2026, at the age of 96.

== See also ==
- List of United States federal judges by longevity of service

== Sources ==
Legal offices
Preceded by Frederick William Kaess	Judge of the United States District Court for the Eastern District of Michigan; 1976–1985	Succeeded by Lawrence Paul Zatkoff
New seat	Judge of the United States Court of Appeals for the Sixth Circuit; 1985–1994	Succeeded by Eric L. Clay
Preceded by Bobby Baldock	Judge of the United States Foreign Intelligence Surveillance Court of Review; 1998–2001	Succeeded by Bruce M. Selya
Preceded by Paul Hitch Roney	Presiding Judge of the United States Foreign Intelligence Surveillance Court of Review; 2001–2005	Succeeded by Edward Leavy
