= United States District Court for the Eastern District of Michigan =

United States federal district court in Michigan

Coordinates: 42°19′49″N 83°2′58.5″W

- (E.D. Mich.)
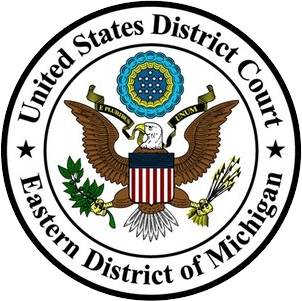

- Location: Theodore Levin U.S. Courthouse (Detroit) More locations: Ann Arbor; Bay City; Flint; Federal Building (Port Huron)
- Appeals to: Sixth Circuit
- Established: February 24, 1863
- Judges: 15
- Chief Judge: Stephen Murphy III

Officers of the court
- U.S. Attorney: Jerome F. Gorgon, Jr.
- U.S. Marshal: Owen M. Cypher
- www.mied.uscourts.gov

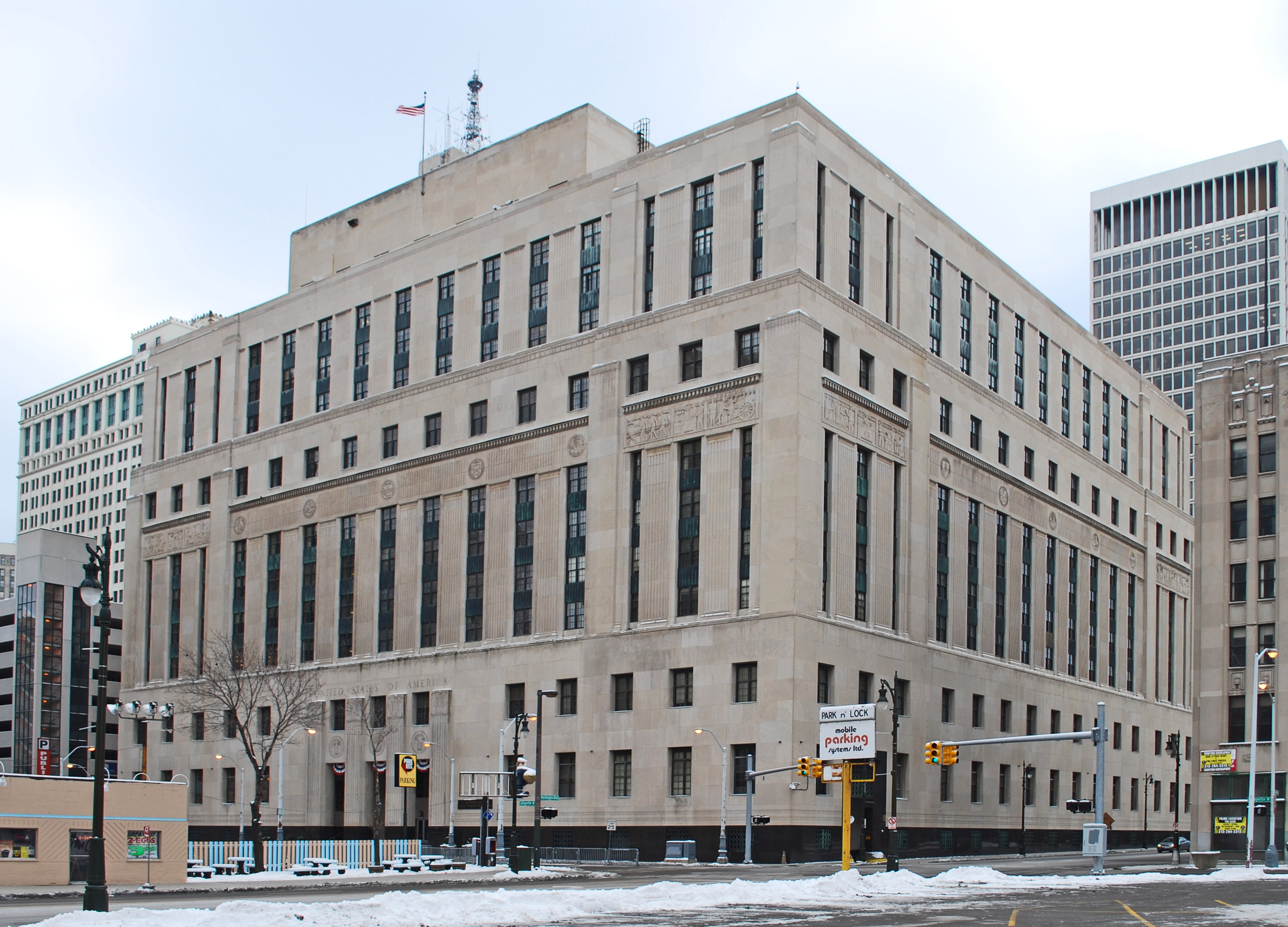
Theodore Levin United States Courthouse in Detroit, taken January 2010.

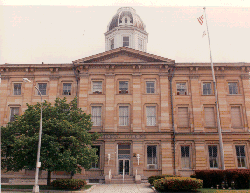
Federal Building and U.S. Courthouse in Port Huron, taken August 2003.

The United States District Court for the Eastern District of Michigan (in case citations, E.D. Mich.) is the federal district court with jurisdiction over the eastern half of the Lower Peninsula of the State of Michigan. The Court is based in Detroit, with courthouses also located in Ann Arbor, Bay City, Flint, and Port Huron. The United States Court of Appeals for the Sixth Circuit has appellate jurisdiction over the court (except for patent claims and claims against the U.S. government under the Tucker Act, which are appealed to the Federal Circuit).

As of July 16, 2025, the United States attorney is Jerome F. Gorgon, Jr.

== History ==
The United States District Court for the District of Michigan was established on July 1, 1836, by 5 Stat. 61, with a single judgeship. The district court was not assigned to a judicial circuit, but was granted the same jurisdiction as United States circuit courts, except in appeals and writs of error, which were the jurisdiction of the Supreme Court. Due to the so-called "Toledo War", a boundary dispute with Ohio, Michigan did not become a state of the Union until January 26, 1837. On March 3, 1837, Congress passed an act that repealed the circuit court jurisdiction of the U.S. District Court for the District of Michigan, assigned the District of Michigan to the Seventh Circuit, and established a U.S. circuit court for the district, 5 Stat. 176.

On July 15, 1862, Congress reorganized the circuits and assigned Michigan to the Eighth Circuit by 12 Stat. 576, and on January 28, 1863, the Congress again reorganized Seventh and Eight Circuits and assigned Michigan to the Seventh Circuit, by 12 Stat. 637. On February 24, 1863, Congress divided the District of Michigan into the Eastern and the Western Districts, with one judgeship authorized for each district, by 12 Stat. 660. Ross Wilkins, who had been the only district judge to serve the District of Michigan, was reassigned to the Eastern District. Finally, on July 23, 1866, by 14 Stat. 209, Congress assigned the two Districts in Michigan to the Sixth Circuit, where they remain.

== Divisions ==
The Eastern District comprises two divisions.

=== Northern Division ===
The Northern Division comprises the counties of Alcona, Alpena, Arenac, Bay, Cheboygan, Clare, Crawford, Gladwin, Gratiot, Huron, Iosco, Isabella, Midland, Montmorency, Ogemaw, Oscoda, Otsego, Presque Isle, Roscommon, Saginaw, and Tuscola.

Court for the Northern Division is held in Bay City.

=== Southern Division ===
The Southern Division comprises the counties of Genesee, Jackson, Lapeer, Lenawee, Livingston, Macomb, Monroe, Oakland, Saint Clair, Sanilac, Shiawassee, Washtenaw, and Wayne.

Court for the Southern Division is held in Ann Arbor, Detroit, Flint, and Port Huron.

== Notable cases ==
Some of the notable cases that have come before the United States District Court for the Eastern District of Michigan include:

- American Civil Liberties Union v. National Security Agency
- Berghuis v. Thompkins
- Conyers v. Bush
- Dean v. Utica Community Schools
- DeBoer v. Snyder
- Hess v. Reynolds
- Hosanna-Tabor Evangelical Lutheran Church & School v. Equal Employment Opportunity Commission
- KSR International Co. v. Teleflex Inc.
- R.G. & G.R. Harris Funeral Homes Inc. v. Equal Employment Opportunity Commission
- United States v. Abdulmutallab
- United States v. Anthony Chebatoris
- United States v. Detroit & Cleveland Navigation Co.
- United States v. Fieger
- United States v. Hathaway
- United States v. Kilpatrick
- United States v. Riverside Bayview
- United States v. Stone
- United States v. United States District Court

== Current judges ==
As of July 29, 2026:

#	Title	Judge	Duty station	Born	Term of service			Appointed by
#	Title	Judge	Duty station	Born	Active	Chief	Senior	Appointed by
59	Chief Judge	Stephen Murphy III	Detroit	1962	2008–present	2025–present	—	G.W. Bush
58	District Judge	Thomas Ludington	Bay City	1953	2006–present	—	—	G.W. Bush
60	District Judge	Mark A. Goldsmith	Detroit	1952	2010–present	—	—	Obama
62	District Judge	Terrence Berg	Detroit	1959	2012–present	—	—	Obama
63	District Judge	Matthew F. Leitman	Detroit	1968	2014–present	—	—	Obama
64	District Judge	Judith E. Levy	Ann Arbor	1958	2014–present	—	—	Obama
65	District Judge	Laurie J. Michelson	Detroit	1967	2014–present	—	—	Obama
66	District Judge	Linda Vivienne Parker	Detroit	1958	2014–present	—	—	Obama
68	District Judge	Shalina D. Kumar	Flint	1971	2021–present	—	—	Biden
69	District Judge	F. Kay Behm	Flint	1969	2022–present	—	—	Biden
70	District Judge	Jonathan J. C. Grey	Detroit	1982	2023–present	—	—	Biden
71	District Judge	Susan K. DeClercq	Detroit	1974	2023–present	—	—	Biden
72	District Judge	Brandy R. McMillion	Detroit	1979	2023–present	—	—	Biden
73	District Judge	Robert J. White	Detroit	1985	2024–present	—	—	Biden
74	District Judge	Michael C. Martin	Detroit	1974	2026–present	—	—	Trump
44	Senior Judge	Bernard A. Friedman	Detroit	1943	1988–2009	2004–2009	2009–present	Reagan
47	Senior Judge	Robert Hardy Cleland	Port Huron	1947	1990–2013	—	2013–present	G.H.W. Bush
48	Senior Judge	Nancy Edmunds	Detroit	1947	1992–2012	—	2012–present	G.H.W. Bush
49	Senior Judge	Denise Page Hood	Detroit	1952	1994–2022	2015–2022	2022–present	Clinton
50	Senior Judge	Paul D. Borman	Detroit	1939	1994–2023	—	2023–present	Clinton
52	Senior Judge	George Steeh III	Detroit	1947	1998–2013	—	2013–present	Clinton
56	Senior Judge	David M. Lawson	Detroit	1951	2000–2021	—	2021–present	Clinton
61	Senior Judge	Gershwin A. Drain	Detroit	1949	2012–2022	—	2022–present	Obama

== Former judges ==
#	Judge	Born–died	Active service	Chief Judge	Senior status	Appointed by	Reason for termination
1	Ross Wilkins	1799–1872	1863–1870 (Note: Reassigned from the District of Michigan.)	—	—	Jackson/Operation of law	retirement
2	John W. Longyear	1820–1875	1870–1875	—	—	Grant	death
3	Henry Billings Brown	1836–1913	1875–1890	—	—	Grant	elevation
4	Henry Harrison Swan	1840–1916	1891–1911	—	—	B. Harrison	retirement
5	Alexis C. Angell	1857–1932	1911–1912	—	—	Taft	resignation
6	Arthur J. Tuttle	1868–1944	1912–1944	—	—	Taft	death
7	Charles C. Simons	1876–1964	1923–1932	—	—	Harding	elevation
8	Edward Julien Moinet	1873–1952	1927–1946 (Note: Recess appointment; formally nominated on December 6, 1927, confirmed by the United States Senate on December 19, 1927, and received commission the same day.)	—	1946–1952	Coolidge	death
9	Ernest Aloysius O'Brien	1880–1948	1931–1948	—	—	Hoover	death
10	Arthur F. Lederle	1887–1972	1936–1960	1948–1959	1960–1972	F. Roosevelt	death
11	Frank Albert Picard	1889–1963	1939–1959	1959	1959–1963	F. Roosevelt	death
12	Arthur A. Koscinski	1887–1957	1945–1957	—	1957	Truman	death
13	Theodore Levin	1897–1970	1946–1970	1959–1967	—	Truman	death
14	Thomas Patrick Thornton	1898–1985	1949–1966	—	1966–1985	Truman	death
15	Ralph M. Freeman	1902–1990	1954–1973	1967–1972	1973–1990	Eisenhower	death
16	Clifford Patrick O'Sullivan	1897–1975	1957–1960	—	—	Eisenhower	elevation
17	Frederick William Kaess	1910–1979	1960–1975	1972–1975	1975–1979	Eisenhower	death
18	John Feikens	1917–2011	1960–1961 (Note: Recess appointment; the Senate later rejected the appointment.)	—	—	Eisenhower	not confirmed
18.1	John Feikens	1917–2011	1970–1986	1979–1986	1986–2011	Nixon	death
19	Thaddeus M. Machrowicz	1899–1970	1961–1970	—	—	Kennedy	death
20	Wade H. McCree	1920–1987	1961–1966	—	—	Kennedy	elevation
21	Talbot Smith	1899–1978	1961–1971 (Note: Recess appointment; formally nominated on January 15, 1962, confirmed by the Senate on February 5, 1962, and received commission on February 9, 1962.)	—	1971–1978	Kennedy	death
22	Stephen John Roth	1908–1974	1962–1974	—	—	Kennedy	death
23	Damon Keith	1922–2019	1967–1977	1975–1977	—	L. Johnson	elevation
24	Lawrence Gubow	1919–1978	1968–1978	—	—	L. Johnson	death
25	Cornelia Kennedy	1923–2014	1970–1979	1977–1979	—	Nixon	elevation
26	Philip Pratt	1924–1989	1970–1989	1986–1989	—	Nixon	death
27	Robert Edward DeMascio	1923–1999	1971–1988	—	1988–1999	Nixon	death
28	Charles Wycliffe Joiner	1916–2017	1972–1984	—	1984–2017	Nixon	death
29	R. James Harvey	1922–2019	1973–1984	—	1984–2019	Nixon	death
30	James Paul Churchill	1924–2020	1974–1989	1989	1989–2020	Ford	death
31	Ralph B. Guy Jr.	1929–2026	1976–1985	—	—	Ford	elevation
32	Patricia Boyle	1937–2014	1978–1983	—	—	Carter	resignation
33	Julian A. Cook	1930–2017	1978–1996	1989–1996	1996–2017	Carter	death
34	Avern Cohn	1924–2022	1979–1999	—	1999–2022	Carter	death
35	Stewart Albert Newblatt	1927–2022	1979–1993	—	1993–2022	Carter	death
36	Anna Diggs Taylor	1932–2017	1979–1998	1996–1998	1998–2017	Carter	death
37	Horace Weldon Gilmore	1918–2010	1980–1991	—	1991–2010	Carter	death
38	George E. Woods	1923–2007	1983–1993	—	1993–2004	Reagan	retirement
39	Richard Fred Suhrheinrich	1936–present	1984–1990	—	—	Reagan	elevation
40	George La Plata	1924–2010	1985–1996	—	—	Reagan	retirement
41	Lawrence Paul Zatkoff	1939–2015	1986–2004	1999–2004	2004–2015	Reagan	death
42	Barbara Kloka Hackett	1928–2018	1986–1997	—	1997–2000	Reagan	retirement
43	Patrick J. Duggan	1933–2020	1986–2000	—	2000–2020	Reagan	death
45	Paul V. Gadola	1929–2014	1988–2001	—	2001–2014	Reagan	death
46	Gerald Ellis Rosen	1951–present	1990–2016	2009–2015	2016–2017	G.H.W. Bush	retirement
51	John Corbett O'Meara	1933–2024	1994–2007	—	2007–2024	Clinton	death
53	Arthur Tarnow	1942–2022	1998–2010	—	2010–2022	Clinton	death
54	Victoria A. Roberts	1951–present	1998–2021	—	2021–2023	Clinton	retirement
55	Marianne Battani	1944–2021	2000–2012	—	2012–2021	Clinton	death
57	Sean Cox	1957–present	2006–2025	2022–2025	—	G.W. Bush	retirement
67	Stephanie D. Davis	1967–present	2019–2022	—	—	Trump	elevation

== Chief judges ==
Chief judges have administrative responsibilities with respect to their district court. Unlike the Supreme Court, where one justice is specifically nominated to be chief, the office of chief judge rotates among the district court judges. To be chief, a judge must have been in active service on the court for at least one year, be under the age of 65, and have not previously served as chief judge.

A vacancy is filled by the judge highest in seniority among the group of qualified judges. The chief judge serves for a term of seven years, or until age 70, whichever occurs first. The age restrictions are waived if no members of the court would otherwise be qualified for the position.

When the office was created in 1948, the chief judge was the longest-serving judge who had not elected to retire, on what has since 1958 been known as senior status, or declined to serve as chief judge. After August 6, 1959, judges could not become or remain chief after turning 70 years old. The current rules have been in operation since October 1, 1982.

== Succession of seats ==
Seat 1
Seat reassigned from District of Michigan on February 24, 1863 by 12 Stat. 660
Wilkins	1863–1870
Longyear	1870–1875
Brown	1875–1890
Swan	1891–1911
Angell	1911–1912
Tuttle	1912–1944
Koscinski	1945–1957
O'Sullivan	1957–1960
Feikens	1960–1961
Roth	1962–1974
Churchill	1974–1989
Cleland	1990–2013
Parker	2014–present

Seat 2
Seat established on September 14, 1922 by 42 Stat. 837 (temporary)
Simons	1923–1932
Seat made permanent on August 19, 1935 by 49 Stat. 659
Lederle	1936–1960
Kaess	1960–1975
Guy, Jr.	1976–1985
Zatkoff	1986–2004
Cox	2006–2025
Martin	2026–present

Seat 3
Seat established on March 3, 1927 by 44 Stat. 1380
Moinet	1927–1946
Levin	1946–1970
DeMascio	1971–1988
Friedman	1988–2009
Drain	2012–2022
McMillion	2023–present

Seat 4
Seat established on February 20, 1931 by 46 Stat. 1197
O'Brien	1931–1948
Thornton	1949–1966
Keith	1967–1977
Boyle	1978–1983
Woods	1983–1993
Hood	1994–2022
Grey	2023–present

Seat 5
Seat established on May 31, 1938 by 52 Stat. 585
Picard	1939–1959
Machrowicz	1961–1970
Kennedy	1970–1979
Gilmore	1980–1991
O'Meara	1994–2007
Goldsmith	2010–present

Seat 6
Seat established on February 10, 1954 by 68 Stat. 8
Freeman	1954–1973
Harvey	1974–1984
Suhrheinrich	1984–1990
Edmunds	1992–2012
Levy	2014–present

Seat 7
Seat established on May 19, 1961 by 75 Stat. 80
McCree, Jr.	1961–1966
Gubow	1968–1978
Cook, Jr.	1978–1996
Tarnow	1998–2010
Berg	2012–present

Seat 8
Seat established on May 19, 1961 by 75 Stat. 80
Smith	1961–1971
Joiner	1972–1984
Hackett	1986–1997
Steeh III	1998–2013
Michelson	2014–present

Seat 9
Seat established on June 2, 1970 by 84 Stat. 294
Feikens	1970–1986
Gadola	1988–2001
Ludington	2006–present

Seat 10
Seat established on June 2, 1970 by 84 Stat. 294
Pratt	1970–1989
Rosen	1990–2016
Davis	2019–2022
DeClercq	2023–present

Seat 11
Seat established on October 20, 1978 by 92 Stat. 1629
Cohn	1979–1999
Lawson	2000–2021
Behm	2022–present

Seat 12
Seat established on October 20, 1978 by 92 Stat. 1629
Newblatt	1979–1993
Borman	1994–2023
White	2024–present

Seat 13
Seat established on October 20, 1978 by 92 Stat. 1629
Taylor	1979–1998
Battani	2000–2012
Leitman	2014–present

Seat 14
Seat established on July 10, 1984 by 98 Stat. 333
La Plata	1985–1996
Roberts	1998–2021
Kumar	2021–present

Seat 15
Seat established on July 10, 1984 by 98 Stat. 333
Duggan, Jr.	1986–2000
Murphy III	2008–present

== See also ==
- Courts of Michigan
- List of current United States district judges
- List of United States federal courthouses in Michigan
