= Theodore Levin United States Courthouse =

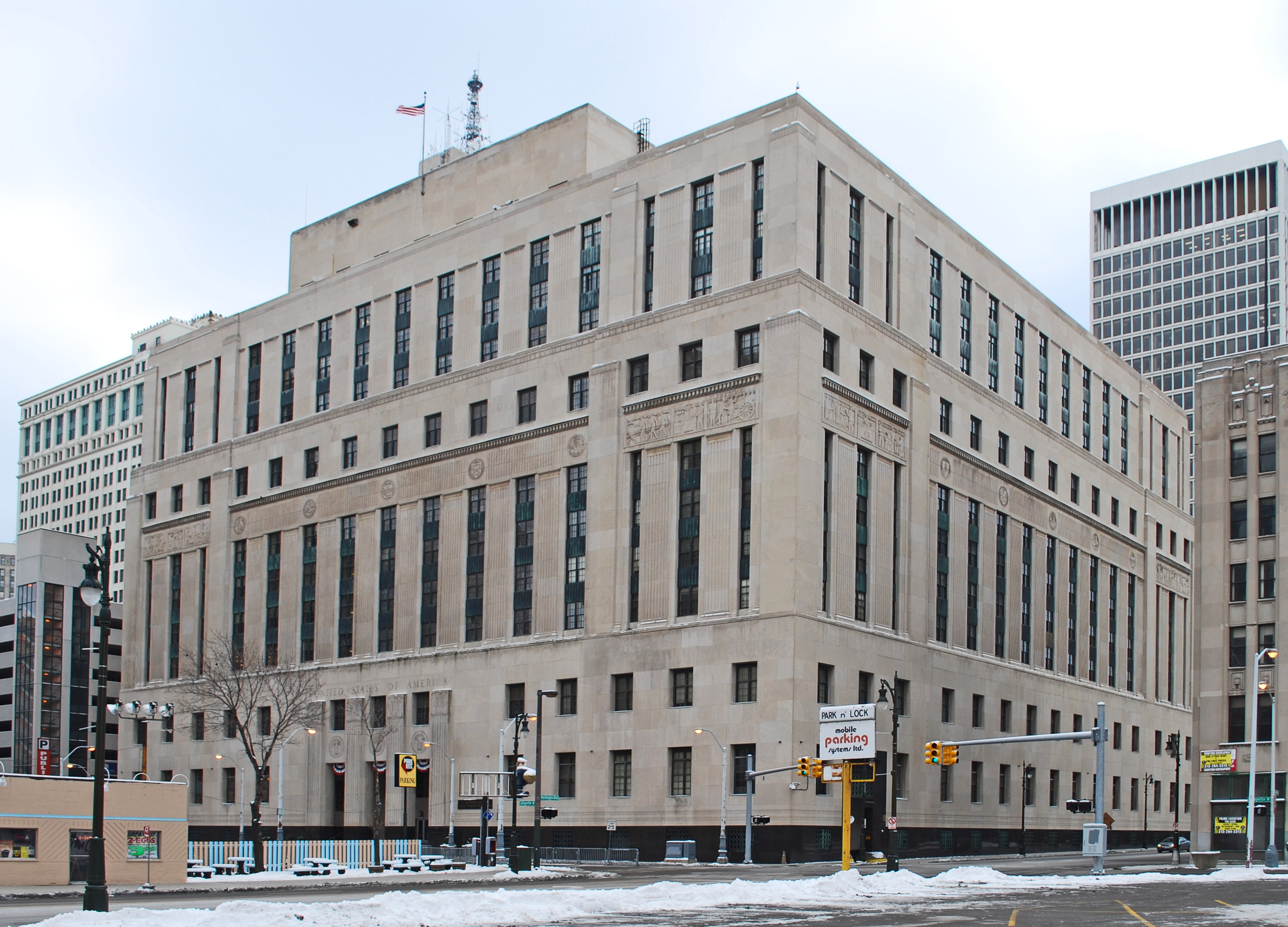
- Interactive map of the Theodore Levin United States Courthouse area

General information
- Type: courthouse
- Location: 231 West Lafayette Boulevard; Detroit, Michigan
- Construction started: 1932
- Completed: 1934

Technical details
- Floor count: 10

Design and construction
- Architects: Branson V. Gamber and Robert O. Derrick
- Theodore Levin United States Courthouse
- U.S. National Register of Historic Places
- U.S. Historic district – Contributing property
- Coordinates: 42°19′49″N 83°2′58.5″W
- Part of: Detroit Financial District (ID09001067)
- NRHP reference No.: 100002381

Significant dates
- Added to NRHP: April 27, 2018
- Designated CP: December 14, 2009

The Theodore Levin United States Courthouse (also known as the Detroit Federal Building) is a large high-rise courthouse and office building located at 231 West Lafayette Boulevard in downtown Detroit, Michigan. The structure occupies an entire block, girdled by Shelby Street (east), Washington Boulevard (west), West Fort Street (south), and West Lafayette Boulevard (north). It is the seat of the United States District Court for the Eastern District of Michigan. The building is named after the late Theodore Levin, a lawyer and United States district judge of the Eastern District, who served as Chief Judge from 1959 through 1967.

Construction began in 1932 and finished in 1934. It stands at 10 stories in height, with its top floor at 50 metres (150 feet) from the first floor entrance, with the roof being 56.1 metres, or 184 feet (56 m) in height from the top of the roof to the streets below. The building was designed in the Art Deco and art moderne styles of architecture, incorporating granite and limestone into the structure. The main façade is limestone, above a polished black stone.

Inside the building, there is an open-center court above the second floor. The building contains relief sculptures of eagles and emblems above the entrance, which symbolize the building's governmental function (as a courthouse).

The seventh floor contains the lavishly decorated, Romanesque style Chief Judge's Courtroom, one of the building's most notable features. At the request of Chief Judge Arthur Tuttle, the courtroom from the previous building (built in 1897) was disassembled and stored during construction, then reassembled in the new building.

== History ==
Before the courthouse was constructed in 1932, the site was the former home of Fort Lernoult (later Fort Shelby) and the 1897 U.S. Post Office, Courthouse and Custom House. The old, original Detroit Customs House and Federal Court building was located on the northwest corner of Griswold and Larned Streets. It was a three-story Renaissance Revival style structure completed in 1861 for $162,000. The old Customs House was finally demolished in 1964, and the site is now a parking garage.

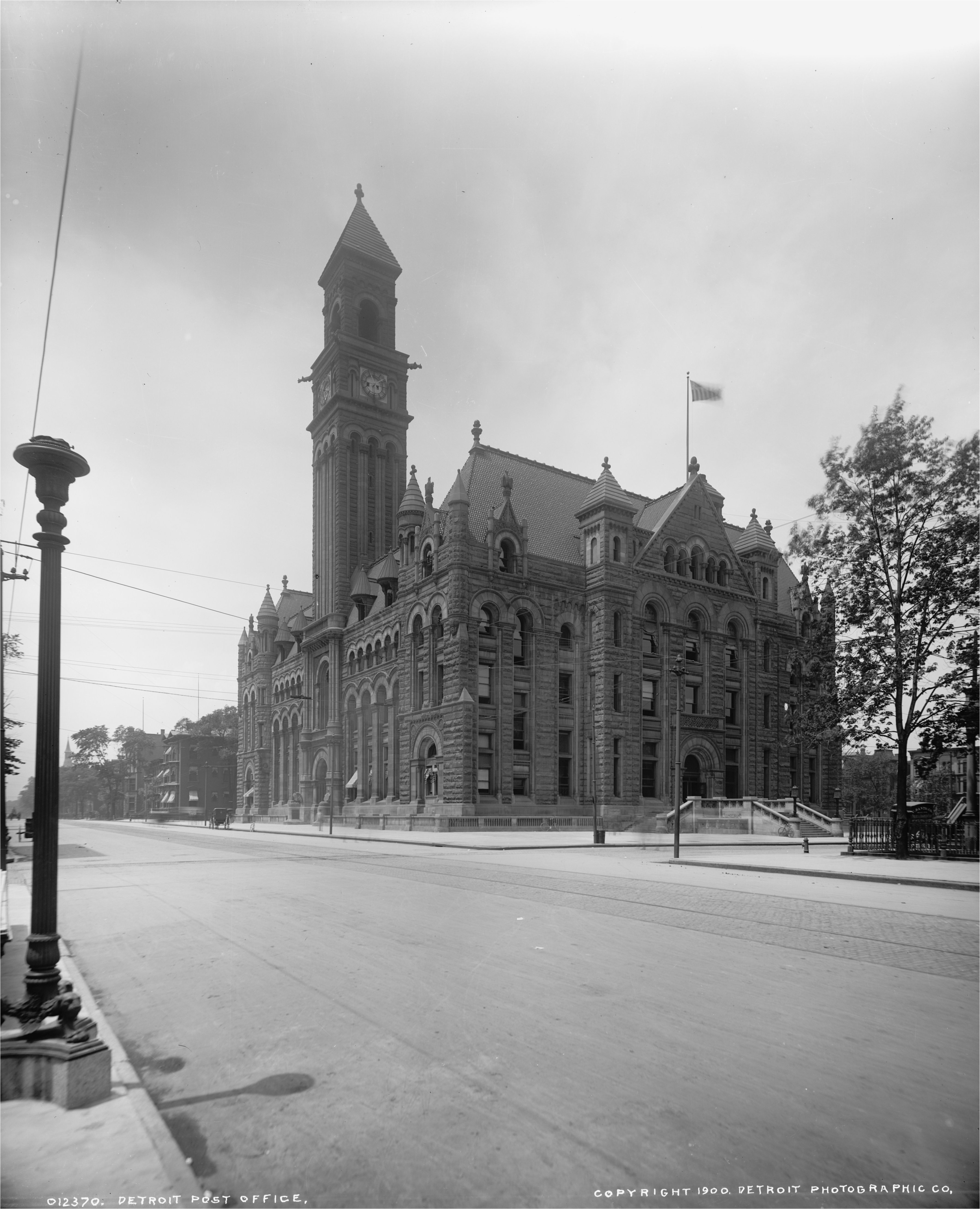
The 1897 Post Office and Courthouse shortly after completion

In the 1880s, plans were developed to demolish the old 1861 Customs House and construct a new and larger facility. However, public objections and ground soil conditions forced the government to select a new site. The block bounded by Lafayette Boulevard, Fort Street, Wayne Street (now Washington Boulevard) and Shelby Street, was purchased for $400,000 in 1887. Excavation for the new Post Office and Courthouse began in June 1890 and the building was occupied in late 1897. Construction costs exceeded $1 million. The massive rock-faced ashlar granite building was designed by Philadelphia architect James H. Windrim. A soaring clock tower with a tiled pyramid roof dominated the Fort Street facade.

Federal authorization and planning for the present building occurred during the presidency of Herbert Hoover. The Detroit Federal Building/U.S. Courthouse was designed Robert O. Derrick, under the auspices of James A. Wetmore, Acting Supervising Architect for the Department of the Treasury. The building's overall impression is one of Neo-Classical Revival with Modernistic traits. Demolition of the 1897 building began in late 1931. Construction began in October 1932 and the completed building opened on April 23, 1934. The budget for construction was over $5.5 million.

The exterior of the building features several ornamental bas-relief sculptural groupings executed by noted Detroit architectural sculptor Corrado Parducci. Parducci designed the sculptural panels and medallions to depict various agencies and activities of the then-current federal government.

On November 2, 1994, the U.S. Congress approved an act to designate the courthouse as the "Theodore Levin United States Courthouse". A ceremony was held in the Spring of 1995 to officially announce the designation and to present new building signs on the Lafayette Boulevard and Fort Street elevations. The building was listed on the National Register of Historic Places in 2018.

In 2015, the General Services Administration (GSA) began a multi-phase renovation of the structure at an anticipated cost of $71 million. The first two phases upgraded plumbing; HVAC; electrical; fire detection and suppression systems; passenger and freight elevators. It also made rest rooms ADA compliant and added an emergency exit for occupants. A third phase which would remove acoustic tile ceilings in some areas to expose the originals and transform the interior courtyard to a green space accessible to building occupants without the need to pass through security screening, is still awaiting funding.

== Architectural description ==
The structural system is of a regular bay steel frame construction, resting on a series of concrete caissons. Concrete is also used for poured-in-place floor slabs as well as fire-proofing for steel columns and beams. The exterior stone cladding is hung from the steel frame or tied to back-up walls of unit masonry.

All four of the exterior elevations are similar, although the primary entries are located on the north and south sides while vehicular openings are located on the east and west. Each elevation is divided vertically into thirds, with a base, a midsection and a top. The base consists of a raised basement and floors one and two and is clad with polished black granite at the water table/raised basement level, and smooth-cut limestone blocks at the first and second stories. The basement, first and second stories have punched recessed openings with bronze sheet sills. The middle portion of the building, floors three through seven, is also faced with smooth-cut limestone articulated by rectilinear pilasters. The windows on the third through sixth stories are grouped vertically and separated by bronze spandrels. The seventh floor windows are in punched openings with bronze sheet sills. The upper portion of the building, floors eight through ten, is characterized by smooth-cut limestone with vertically-grouped windows aligning with those of the middle section. The cubic mass of the building is relieved by minor setbacks at the third and eighth floor levels. An ornamental frieze with relief sculpture extends around the building between the sixth and seventh floors. Each elevation has carved relief panels located in its end bays. The panels depict 1930s-era federal government agencies. Extending between the end bays is a frieze of circular medallions alternating with carved, fluted panels. The medallions depict various symbols of the federal government.

The building has bronze framed, single-glazed, double-hung windows of varying proportions. Typically, the first floor openings are glazed with double four-over-six sash and are surmounted by fixed transoms. Floors two and seven have double, four-over-six sash without transoms. Floors three through six and eight through ten have paired, double-hung sash with four-over-four lights grouped vertically and separated by fluted bronze spandrels.

The principal entries to the building are located on the north and south elevations. Each entry is centered on the elevation where three portals are defined by four fluted pilasters surmounted with stylized eagles. These entries are reached by granite stairs leading from the sidewalk level to recessed loggias. At the north end of the east and west elevations are granite-clad vehicular sally-ports which lead into the basement level parking/loading dock area.

The "million dollar courtroom"

Significant interior spaces include the vaulted public concourse which extends north–south between the primary entries on the first floor, and the two-story courtrooms located on the seventh and eighth floors. The concourse originally served as public access to postal services and still retains some counters and windows used by the post office. The areas of the first floor that housed postal workrooms have been remodeled into office and courtroom space. One of the building's most notable features is the Chief Judge's Courtroom, Room 732–734, on the seventh floor, salvaged from the previous federal building that occupied the site. At the request of Chief Judge Arthur Tuttle, the courtroom was disassembled and stored during construction, then reassembled in the new building. The "million dollar courtroom," as newspapers dubbed it at the time, contains more than 30 types of marble. The bench is carved from East Indian mahogany, and is flanked by two 12-foot (3.7 m)-tall columns of Italian marble, each topped by four lions holding up a globe. Behind the bench is a frieze of 10 female figures depicting the purity of justice. A frieze of more than 100 unique lions' heads surrounds the room just below the ceiling. Only the floor and ceiling were modernized when the room was reassembled. The Romanesque style courtroom stands in dramatic contrast to the stripped, neo-classical and modernistic details typical of the other courtrooms. Chief Justice of the United States John Roberts has reportedly described it as one of the finest and most beautiful courtrooms he has seen.

The building was originally designed and engineered to carry two more full stories in place of the penthouses at the eleventh and twelfth floors. A 1931 publication rendering depicts the courthouse with twelve full stories. Their elimination may have stemmed from budget shortfalls during the period of construction between 1932 and 1934 which coincided with the height of the Great Depression.

== Alternate names ==
The building is also known by other names, such as: Detroit Federal Building, Detroit Custom House, Detroit Post Office.

== Gallery ==
Details from the "million dollar courtroom"

Detail

First floor lobby

Interior corridor
