= John Feikens =

American judge (1917–2011)

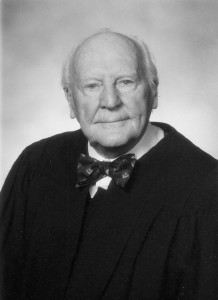

Senior Judge of the United States District Court for the Eastern District of Michigan
- In office March 1, 1986 – May 15, 2011

Chief Judge of the United States District Court for the Eastern District of Michigan
- In office 1979–1986
- Preceded by: Cornelia Groefsema Kennedy
- Succeeded by: Philip Pratt

Judge of the United States District Court for the Eastern District of Michigan
- In office December 1, 1970 – March 1, 1986
- Appointed by: Richard Nixon
- Preceded by: Seat established by 84 Stat. 294
- Succeeded by: Paul V. Gadola
- In office October 13, 1960 – September 27, 1961
- Appointed by: Dwight D. Eisenhower
- Preceded by: Clifford Patrick O'Sullivan
- Succeeded by: Stephen John Roth

Personal details
- Born: John Feikens; December 3, 1917 Clifton, New Jersey
- Died: May 15, 2011 (aged 93) Grosse Pointe Park, Michigan
- Education: Calvin College (B.A.); University of Michigan Law School (J.D.)

John Feikens (December 3, 1917 – May 15, 2011) was a United States district judge of the United States District Court for the Eastern District of Michigan.

== Education and career ==
Born December 3, 1917, in Clifton, New Jersey, Feikens received a Bachelor of Arts degree in 1939 from Calvin College and a Juris Doctor in 1941 from the University of Michigan Law School. He worked for the priorities and war allocations department of the Detrex Corporation in Detroit, Michigan from 1942 to 1946. He was in private practice in Detroit from 1946 to 1960 and from 1961 to 1970.

== Federal judicial service ==
Feikens received a recess appointment from President Dwight D. Eisenhower on October 13, 1960, to a seat on the United States District Court for the Eastern District of Michigan vacated by Judge Clifford Patrick O`Sullivan. He was nominated to the same position by President Eisenhower on January 10, 1961. His service was terminated on September 27, 1961, after his nomination was not confirmed by the United States Senate. A previous nomination by President Eisenhower on June 10, 1960, expired without action by the Senate, prior to his recess appointment.

Feikens was nominated by President Richard Nixon on October 7, 1970, to the United States District Court for the Eastern District of Michigan, to a new seat authorized by 84 Stat. 294. He was confirmed by the Senate on November 25, 1970, and received his commission on December 1, 1970. He served as Chief Judge from 1979 to 1986. He assumed senior status on March 1, 1986. His service terminated on May 15, 2011, due to his death in Grosse Pointe Park, Michigan.

=== Notable Decisions ===
==== Procter Gamble Co. v. Bankers Trust Co. ====
On September 13, 1995, Bankers Trust Co and Procter & Gamble alerted Feikens that Business Week, a magazine owned by McGraw-Hill, had obtained documents from ongoing litigation between the two parties. Both Bankers and P&G desired the details to remain secret. That same day, without notice or hearing, Feikens issued an order enjoining and prohibiting McGraw-Hill from publishing the documents without consent of the court. The action raised significant First Amendment concerns as a rare instance of prior restraint against the press, a legal issue considered settled in favor of the press in the Pentagon Papers case of 1971, New York Times Company v. United States. On March 5, 1996, a three-judge panel of the United States Court of Appeals for the Sixth Circuit ruled 2 to 1 that Feikens had been wrong to bar the publication of an article based on the documents.

== Professional associations, civic and other activities ==
- Director of the Detroit Bar Association (1962–1967), president 1967; trustee to the Detroit Bar Association Foundation
- Member of the American Bar Association
- State Bar of Michigan Commissioner (1965–1971)
- Member of Fellow American College of Trial Lawyers
- Director of the Economic Club of Detroit
- Co-Chairman, Michigan Civil Rights Commission, (1964–1968)
- Board of Trustees, New Detroit, Inc. (1968–1970)
- Board of Trustees, Calvin College (1968–1974)
- University of Michigan Club
- Committee of Visitors, University of Michigan Law School
- Director, Economic Club of Detroit

Party political offices
Preceded by Owen Cleary	Chairman of the Michigan Republican Party; 1953–1957	Succeeded by Lawrence Lindemer
Legal offices
Preceded by Clifford Patrick O'Sullivan	Judge of the United States District Court for the Eastern District of Michigan; 1960–1961	Succeeded by Stephen John Roth
Preceded by Seat established by 84 Stat. 294	Judge of the United States District Court for the Eastern District of Michigan; 1970–1986	Succeeded by Paul V. Gadola
Preceded by Cornelia Groefsema Kennedy	Chief Judge of the United States District Court for the Eastern District of Michigan; 1979–1986	Succeeded by Philip Pratt
