= Cornelia Groefsema Kennedy =

American judge (1923–2014)

Hon. Cornelia Kennedy
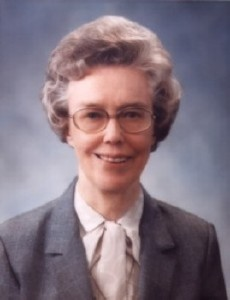

Senior Judge of the United States Court of Appeals for the Sixth Circuit
- In office March 1, 1999 – May 12, 2014

Judge of the United States Court of Appeals for the Sixth Circuit
- In office September 26, 1979 – March 1, 1999
- Appointed by: Jimmy Carter
- Preceded by: Seat established
- Succeeded by: Susan Bieke Neilson

Chief Judge of the United States District Court for the Eastern District of Michigan
- In office October 21, 1977 – September 26, 1979
- Preceded by: Damon Keith
- Succeeded by: John Feikens

Judge of the United States District Court for the Eastern District of Michigan
- In office October 7, 1970 – September 26, 1979
- Appointed by: Richard Nixon
- Preceded by: Thaddeus M. Machrowicz
- Succeeded by: Horace Weldon Gilmore

Personal details
- Born: Cornelia Groefsema; August 4, 1923 Detroit, Michigan, U.S.
- Died: May 12, 2014 (aged 90) Grosse Pointe Woods, Michigan, U.S.
- Party: Republican
- Education: University of Michigan (BA, JD)

Cornelia Groefsema Kennedy (née Groefsema; August 4, 1923 – May 12, 2014) was a United States circuit judge of the United States Court of Appeals for the Sixth Circuit.

== Education and career ==
Born in Detroit, Michigan, Kennedy graduated from the University of Michigan with a Bachelor of Arts degree in 1945 and at the top of her class from the University of Michigan Law School with a Juris Doctor in 1947. After law school, she clerked for Chief Judge Harold Montelle Stephens of the United States Court of Appeals for the District of Columbia Circuit, where she was one of the first women to clerk on that court. In 1965 Kennedy ran for Wayne County Circuit Court judge and lost by fewer than 100 votes. Kennedy and her sister, Judge Margaret G. Schaeffer, were the first sister judges in the United States. Schaeffer sat on the 47th District Court in Farmington Hills, Michigan from 1974 to 1992. She was in private practice of law in Detroit from 1948 to 1966. She was a judge of the Michigan Circuit Court for the Third Judicial Circuit from 1966 to 1970.

== Federal judicial service ==
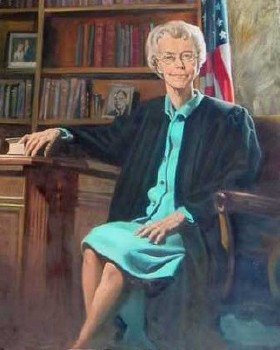
Judicial portrait of Kennedy by Robert Maniscalco.

Kennedy was nominated by President Richard Nixon on September 3, 1970, to a seat on the United States District Court for the Eastern District of Michigan vacated by Judge Thaddeus M. Machrowicz. She was confirmed by the United States Senate on October 6, 1970, and received her commission on October 7, 1970. She served as Chief Judge from 1977 to 1979, becoming the first female chief judge of a federal district court. Her service was terminated on October 3, 1979, due to elevation to the Sixth Circuit.

Kennedy was nominated by President Jimmy Carter on April 9, 1979, to the United States Court of Appeals for the Sixth Circuit, to a new seat created by 92 Stat. 1629. She was confirmed by the Senate on September 25, 1979, and received her commission on September 26, 1979. She assumed senior status on March 1, 1999, serving in that status until her death.

== Supreme Court consideration ==
In 1981 President Ronald Reagan had narrowed his search for Justice Potter Stewart's replacement to Kennedy and Sandra Day O'Connor as the first woman on the United States Supreme Court, before eventually choosing O'Connor for the vacant seat.

In 1975 Kennedy was also on the shortlist for the seat vacated by the departure of William O. Douglas, which eventually went to John Paul Stevens.

== Connection Distributing v. Keisler ==
Kennedy authored the majority opinion in Connection Distributing Co. v. Keisler, 505 F.3d 545 (6th Cir. 2007), which declared Section 2257 of the Child Protection and Obscenity Enforcement Act unconstitutional. The U.S. Court of Appeals for the Sixth Circuit en banc vacated the decision and upheld Section 2257 in Connection Distributing Co. v. Holder with Kennedy authoring the primary dissent.

== Personal life ==
Groefsema married Charles Stuart Kennedy, Jr. They had one son, Charles Stuart Kennedy III (born November 8, 1962). Kennedy died at age 90 on May 12, 2014.

== See also ==
- Gerald Ford Supreme Court candidates
- Ronald Reagan Supreme Court candidates
- List of first women lawyers and judges in the United States

Legal offices
Preceded by Thaddeus M. Machrowicz	Judge of the United States District Court for the Eastern District of Michigan; 1970–1979	Succeeded by Horace Weldon Gilmore
Preceded by Damon Keith	Chief Judge of the United States District Court for the Eastern District of Michigan; 1977–1979	Succeeded by John Feikens
New seat	Judge of the United States Court of Appeals for the Sixth Circuit; 1979–1999	Succeeded by Susan Bieke Neilson
