= Lawrence Paul Zatkoff =

American judge (1939–2015)

Senior Judge of the United States District Court for the Eastern District of Michigan
- In office June 16, 2004 – January 22, 2015

Chief Judge of the United States District Court for the Eastern District of Michigan
- In office 1999–2004
- Preceded by: Anna Diggs Taylor
- Succeeded by: Bernard A. Friedman

Judge of the United States District Court for the Eastern District of Michigan
- In office March 4, 1986 – June 16, 2004
- Appointed by: Ronald Reagan
- Preceded by: Ralph B. Guy Jr.
- Succeeded by: Sean Cox

Personal details
- Born: Lawrence Paul Zatkoff; June 16, 1939 Detroit, Michigan
- Died: February 22, 2015 (aged 75) St. Clair Shores, Michigan
- Education: University of Detroit (BS); Detroit College of Law (JD)

Lawrence Paul Zatkoff (June 16, 1939 – January 22, 2015) was a United States district judge of the United States District Court for the Eastern District of Michigan.

== Education and career ==
Born in Detroit, Michigan, Zatkoff received a Bachelor of Science from the University of Detroit (now University of Detroit Mercy) in 1962 and a Juris Doctor from Detroit College of Law (now Michigan State University College of Law) in 1966. He was an assistant prosecuting attorney of Macomb County, Michigan in 1966. He was in private practice in Detroit, Michigan from 1966 to 1968, and in Roseville, Michigan from 1968 to 1978, also serving as a member of the faculty of Detroit College of Law from 1968 to 1969, and as an associate government appeal agent for the Selective Service Administration from 1969 to 1972. He was a judge on the Macomb County Probate Court from 1978 to 1982, and on the Macomb County Circuit Court from 1982 to 1986.

== Federal judicial service ==
On January 21, 1986, Zatkoff was nominated by President Ronald Reagan to a seat on the United States District Court for the Eastern District of Michigan vacated by Judge Ralph B. Guy Jr. Zatkoff was confirmed by the United States Senate on March 3, 1986, and received his commission on March 4, 1986. He served as Chief Judge from 1999 to 2004, assuming senior status on June 16, 2004. Zatkoff died of cancer on January 22, 2015, in St. Clair Shores, Michigan.

== Sources ==
Legal offices
Preceded by Ralph B. Guy Jr.	Judge of the United States District Court for the Eastern District of Michigan; 1986–2004	Succeeded by Sean Cox
Preceded by Anna Diggs Taylor	Chief Judge of the United States District Court for the Eastern District of Michigan; 1999–2004	Succeeded by Bernard A. Friedman
