= Charles C. Simons =

American judge (1876–1964)

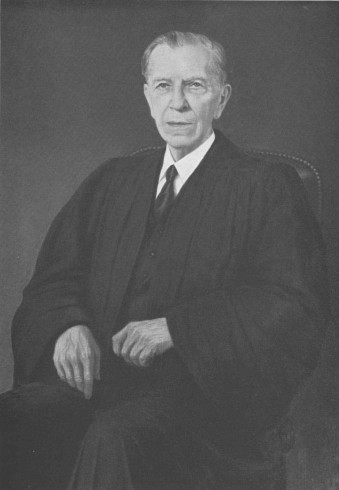

Senior Judge of the United States Court of Appeals for the Sixth Circuit
- In office September 15, 1959 – February 2, 1964

Chief Judge of the United States Court of Appeals for the Sixth Circuit
- In office 1952–1958
- Preceded by: Xenophon Hicks
- Succeeded by: Florence E. Allen

Judge of the United States Court of Appeals for the Sixth Circuit
- In office January 29, 1932 – September 15, 1959
- Appointed by: Herbert Hoover
- Preceded by: Arthur Carter Denison
- Succeeded by: Clifford Patrick O'Sullivan

Judge of the United States District Court for the Eastern District of Michigan
- In office February 6, 1923 – February 2, 1932
- Appointed by: Warren G. Harding
- Preceded by: Seat established by 42 Stat. 837
- Succeeded by: Arthur F. Lederle

Personal details
- Born: Charles Caspar Simons; May 21, 1876 Detroit, Michigan
- Died: February 2, 1964 (aged 87)
- Party: Republican
- Education: University of Michigan (BL); University of Michigan Law School (LLB)

Charles Caspar Simons (May 21, 1876 – February 2, 1964) was a United States circuit judge of the United States Court of Appeals for the Sixth Circuit and previously was a United States district judge of the United States District Court for the Eastern District of Michigan.

== Education and career ==
Born in Detroit, Michigan, Simons received a Bachelor of Laws from the University of Michigan in 1898 and a second Bachelor of Laws from the University of Michigan Law School in 1900. He was in private practice in Detroit from 1900 to 1923, also serving as a Republican member of the Michigan Senate representing the 2nd district from 1903 to 1904, a Circuit Court commissioner for Wayne County, Michigan from 1905 to 1906, and a member of the Michigan Constitutional Convention in 1908.

== Federal judicial service ==
Simons was nominated by President Warren G. Harding on January 31, 1923, to the United States District Court for the Eastern District of Michigan, to a new seat authorized by 42 Stat. 837. He was confirmed by the United States Senate on February 6, 1923, and received his commission the same day. His service terminated on February 2, 1932, due to his elevation to the Sixth Circuit.

Simons was nominated by President Herbert Hoover on January 8, 1932, to a seat on the United States Court of Appeals for the Sixth Circuit vacated by Judge Arthur Carter Denison. He was confirmed by the Senate on January 26, 1932, and received his commission on January 29, 1932. He served as Chief Judge and as a member of the Judicial Conference of the United States from 1952 to 1958. He assumed senior status on September 15, 1959. His service terminated on February 2, 1964, due to his death. In 1948, Simons authored an article in the American Bar Association Journal titled "Judicial Powers: Their Exercise Without Constitutional Safeguards."

== See also ==
- List of United States federal judges by longevity of service

== Sources ==
Legal offices
Preceded by Seat established by 42 Stat. 837	Judge of the United States District Court for the Eastern District of Michigan; 1923–1932	Succeeded by Arthur F. Lederle
Preceded by Arthur Carter Denison	Judge of the United States Court of Appeals for the Sixth Circuit; 1932–1959	Succeeded by Clifford Patrick O'Sullivan
Preceded by Xenophon Hicks	Chief Judge of the United States Court of Appeals for the Sixth Circuit; 1952–1958	Succeeded by Florence E. Allen
