= Federal Building (Port Huron, Michigan) =

- U.S. National Register of Historic Places
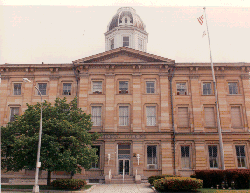
- Federal Building-U.S. Courthouse, August 2003

- Location within Michigan Location within the United States
- Interactive map showing the location for Port Huron Federal Building
- Location: 526 Water St., Port Huron, Michigan
- Coordinates: 42°58′29″N 82°25′34″W
- Area: 1.1 acres (0.45 ha)
- Built: 1874
- Architect: Mullet, Alfred B.
- Architectural style: Classical Revival
- NRHP reference No.: 74002047
- Added to NRHP: August 7, 1974

The Federal Building and U.S. Courthouse, Port Huron, Michigan is a historic courthouse and federal office building located at Port Huron in St. Clair County, Michigan. It is a courthouse of the United States District Court for the Eastern District of Michigan.

== Building history ==
The Federal Building and U.S. Courthouse in Port Huron, Michigan, is located on the south side of the Black River in the central business district. It has the distinction of being the oldest federal building in the State of Michigan still occupied by the federal government; it was built to house some of the government's oldest agencies.

In 1872, Congress authorized construction of a building to house the U.S. Customs Service, a post office, and other federal agencies in Port Huron. Alfred B. Mullett, supervising architect of the U.S. Treasury Department, designed the building. Construction began in 1873, and the cornerstone was laid on October 8, 1874. It was completed in 1877 at a cost of $200,000, with tenants occupying their new building in May of that year. In 1916, a classical fountain that originally stood in front of the building was replaced with a war memorial. In 1930, Congress appropriated $115,000 for an addition to the building. The Office of the Supervising Architect under James A. Wetmore, oversaw design of the one-story addition. Construction of the addition was completed in 1933.

In 1959–1960, the post office vacated the building and, at a cost of $250,000, the first floor was renovated to house the Social Security Administration. The building was listed in the National Register of Historic Places in 1974. Federal courts continue to occupy the building's second floor. Additionally, the Department of Homeland Security’s Customs and Border Protection maintains offices in the building.

== Architecture ==
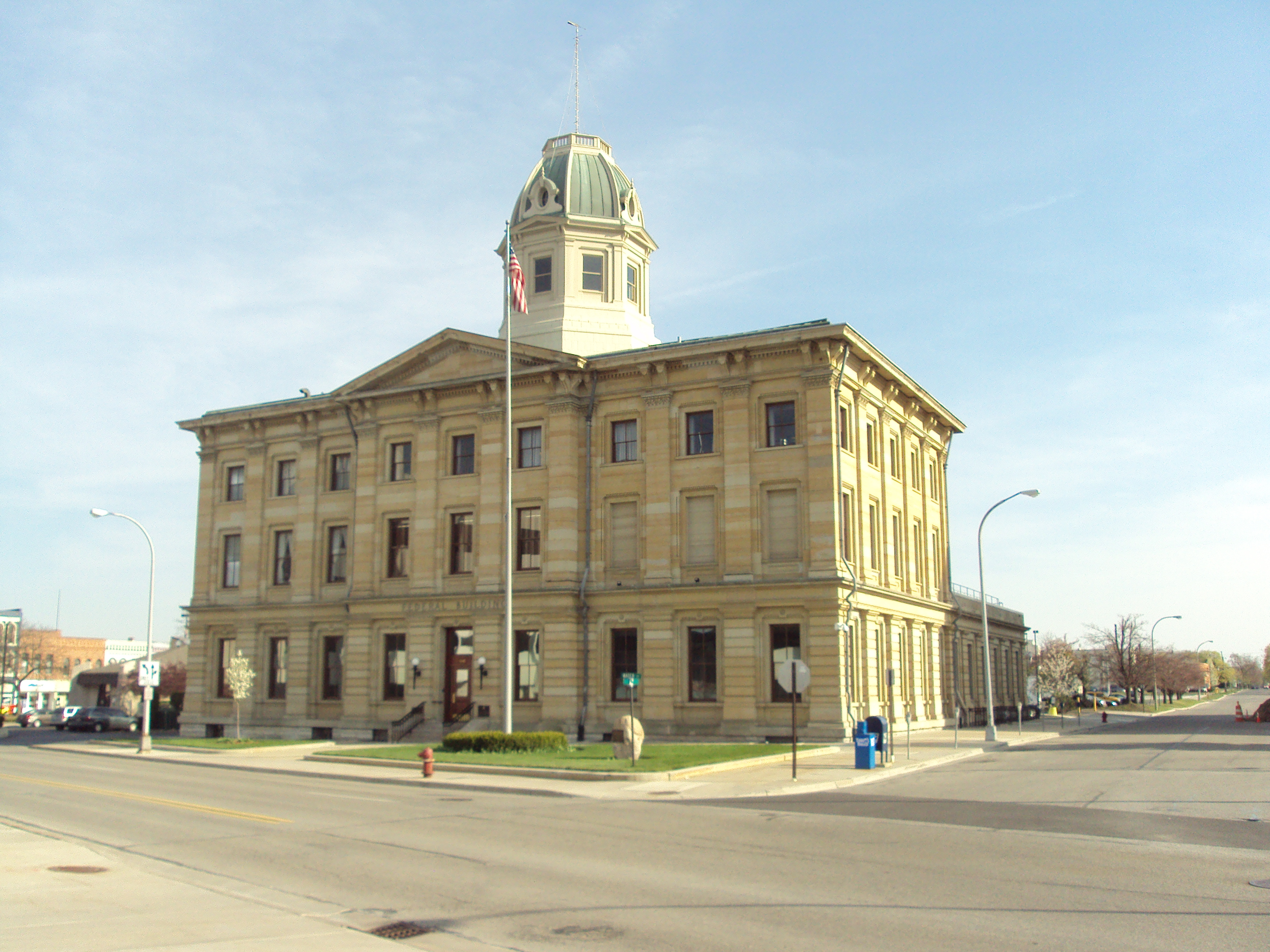

The three-story Federal Building and U.S. Courthouse is an example of Renaissance Revival style with Greek Revival influences. The load-bearing exterior walls are built of limestone at the ground level and sandstone on the upper three stories. Constructed in 1873–1877, the original portion of the building has front and rear (north and south) elevations divided into nine bays, while the east and west sides contain five bays. The north and south elevations are highlighted by centered three-bay pavilions topped by pediments with dentil-block molding. The north facade originally contained three entrances, but only the center entrance remains, and the flanking entries have been converted into windows. The entry has a half-glass door with sidelights and a square transom, with historic light fixtures to either side. The first- and second-story windows are rectangular, while the third-story windows are smaller and square. Both the window and door openings are trimmed with flat stone arches detailed with egg-and-dart carvings.

A sandstone water table caps the foundation wall. Deeply cut pilasters define the bays on the first story and terminate in Doric capitals at a flat entablature that forms a belt course between the first and second stories. On the second and third stories, the pilasters rise to the base of the low-pitched roof and terminate in simplified Corinthian order capitals. A cornice composed of stone brackets and dentils sits atop the pilasters. The building is topped by an octagonal cupola pierced by windows flanked by engaged pilasters and topped with bracketed pediments. The copper-clad mansard roof features oval windows accented with decorative stone surrounds with keystones. In 1986–1987, a $1.15 million exterior restoration and copper roofing project was completed.

The interior features an original cast-iron staircase adjacent to the eastern entrance. It is highlighted by a continuous iron balustrade with a wooden railing and decorative newel posts. The original postal lobby, once stretching the length of the building along the north facade, was completely removed by 1959–1960 renovation work, but was restored in 2008 under the First Impressions Initiative of the U.S. General Services Administration (GSA). The initiative uses historic building outlease funds to reclaim the architectural integrity of altered entrances and lobbies. Utilizing historic photos, GSA recreated the original lobby volume, architectural details, and ornamentation, reestablishing the building as a community landmark.

On upper stories, the stair lobbies open to corridors leading to offices and courtrooms. The corridors retain wood wainscoting, moldings, and trim with classical details around the doors and windows. Crown molding extends along the ceiling. The remaining interior spaces of the original building and addition have been renovated over the years to accommodate new office uses.

The materials and design of the one-story rear addition, built in 1932–1933, generally match the original building. The west elevation continues the rusticated pilasters and projecting belt course, but is terminated by a flat, stone parapet at the second-story level.

== History ==
- 1873–1877: Federal Building and U.S. Courthouse constructed
- 1932–1933: Addition constructed
- 1974: Listed in the National Register of Historic Places
- 1986–1987: Exterior restoration and copper roof project completed
- 2007–2008: Postal lobby restored by GSA

== Building facts ==
- Location: 526 Water Street
- Architects: Alfred B. Mullet; James A. Wetmore
- Construction Dates: 1873–1877; 1932–1933
- Architectural Style: Renaissance Revival
- Landmark Status: Listed in the National Register of Historic Places
- Primary Materials: Sandstone and limestone
- Prominent Features: Classically detailed facade; Octagonal cupola with mansard roof; Stone cornice with carved brackets; Original cast iron staircase
