= Detroit bankruptcy =

City of Detroit's 2013 bankruptcy filing

The city of Detroit, Michigan, filed for Chapter 9 bankruptcy on July 18, 2013. It is the largest municipal bankruptcy filing in U.S. history by debt, estimated at $18–20 billion, exceeding Jefferson County, Alabama's $4-billion filing in 2011. Detroit is also the largest city by population in U.S. history to file for Chapter 9 bankruptcy, more than twice as large as Stockton, California, which filed in 2012. Detroit's population had declined from a peak of 1.8 million in 1950 to 700,000 at the time of its bankruptcy.

Detroit's bankruptcy filing followed a declaration of financial emergency in March 2013 that resulted in Kevyn Orr being appointed as "emergency manager" of the city by Michigan Governor Rick Snyder. Orr's subsequent negotiations sought to get creditors to willingly agree to debt restructuring and accept less than initially agreed on Detroit's debt, and were ultimately unsuccessful.

On July 19, 2013, Judge Rosemarie Aquilina of the Thirtieth Judicial Circuit Court of Michigan ruled the bankruptcy filing by Detroit violated Article IX, Section 24, of the Michigan Constitution and ordered Governor Rick Snyder to withdraw the filing immediately. On July 23, an appeals court stayed the circuit court ruling pending future rulings on Michigan Attorney General Bill Schuette's appeal. On July 24, the Bankruptcy Court added its own, federal stay of the state court proceedings. On August 2, the bankruptcy court set a hearing date of October 23, 2013, for trial on any objections to the city's eligibility for Chapter 9 bankruptcy, and March 1, 2014, as the deadline for the city to file a bankruptcy plan. After a nine-day trial on eligibility, the Bankruptcy Court on December 3, 2013, ruled Detroit eligible for Chapter 9 on its $18.5 billion debt. On June 3, 2014 the Michigan Legislature passed a package of bills to help Detroit avoid further bankruptcy proceedings. On the same day, Governor Snyder pledged to sign the package of bills.

After a two-month trial, Judge Steven W. Rhodes confirmed the city's plan of adjustment on November 7, 2014, paving the way for Detroit to exit bankruptcy. Creditors and insurers were expected to absorb losses totaling $7 billion, with creditors receiving between 14 and 75 cents on the dollar.

== Background ==
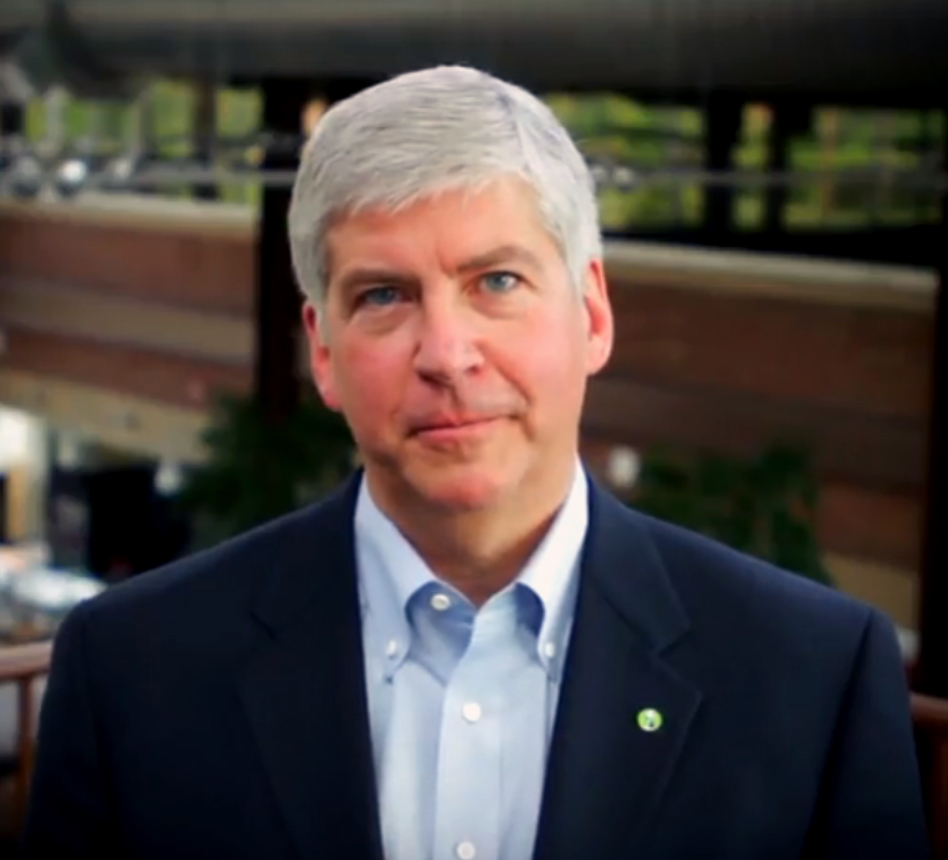
Michigan Governor Rick Snyder (Republican)

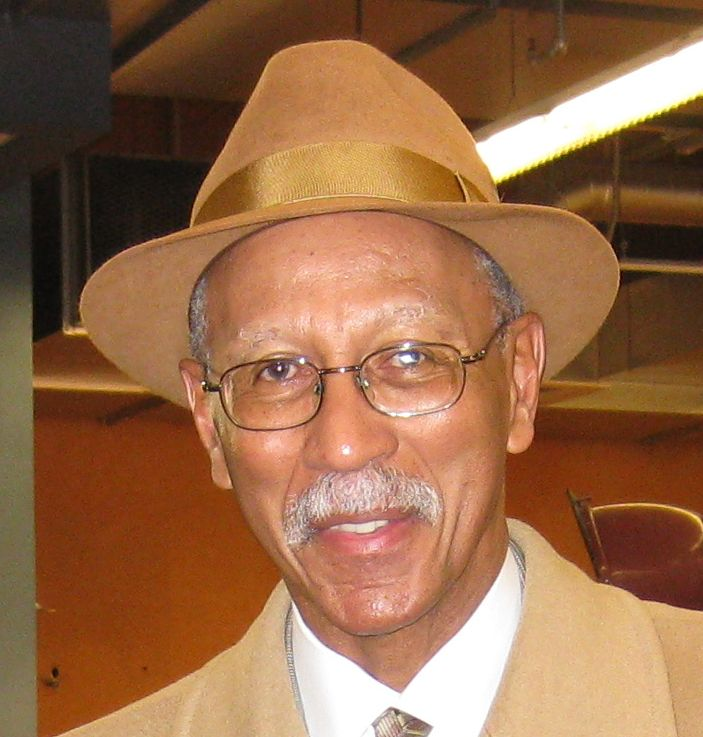
Detroit Mayor Dave Bing (Democrat)

In April 2012, Detroit Mayor Dave Bing and the nine-member City Council entered into an agreement with Michigan Governor Rick Snyder that allowed for greater fiscal oversight by the state government in exchange for the state's providing Detroit help with its finances. A financial review team was appointed in December 2012 to conduct a 60-day review. The team consisted of Andy Dillon (Treasurer of Michigan), Thomas McTavish (Michigan Chief Financial Officer and Auditor General), Ken Whippel (Korn/Ferry), Darrell Burks (PricewaterhouseCoopers), Ronald Goldsberry (Deloitte Consulting) and Frederick Headen. In February 2013, Snyder announced that the Michigan state government was taking financial control of the city of Detroit, as it viewed that Detroit failed to meet deadlines set by the state government. In accordance with Public Act 72 of 1990, the state government's Local Emergency Financial Assistance Loan Board appointed Kevyn Orr as the emergency financial manager of Detroit following a declaration of financial emergency. As emergency manager, Orr was granted the power to rewrite Detroit's contracts and to liquidate city assets.

A report on the financial health of Detroit was released by Orr in May 2013. The report stated that Detroit is "clearly insolvent on a cash flow basis" and that the city would finish its current fiscal year with a US$162 million cash-flow shortfall. It also stated that the city's budget deficit would reach $386 million in less than two months and that one-third of the city's budget was going toward retiree benefits.

Declining city revenue led to the cash-flow shortfall in Detroit. In 2005, the city's budget was facing a $300 million deficit, sparking fears of potential receivership. In 2013, Detroit’s revenue had fallen over 20% from its 2008 level. Revenue fell due to Detroit’s declining population, which reduced the property and income tax base. Rising foreclosures and unemployment following the Great Recession reduced property values and further reduced the property and income tax base. Additionally, Michigan decreased state revenue sharing with Detroit due to declining population numbers reported in the 2010 census.

City expenses also contributed to the cash-flow shortfall. City operating expenses decreased by 38% between 2008 and 2013 through employee layoffs and reduction of employee healthcare and benefits. At the same time, debt payments, retiree healthcare and pension payments, and most significantly, financial expenses, increased between 2008 and 2013. Financial expenses included certificates of participation to finance $1.6 billion in debt, which required termination payments as a result of the city’s low credit rating.

Contributions of city revenue and expenses to the cash-flow shortfall help explain the immediate causes of Detroit’s bankruptcy filing, but Detroit’s complex history provides greater context for the city’s financial problems. The decline of population and employment opportunities in Detroit had been going on for decades prior to the bankruptcy filing. Detroit’s population declined from 2 million in 1950 to 714,000 in 2010. Jobs followed the population, as over two-thirds of businesses in Detroit closed between 1972 and 2015. Many of these residents and jobs left Detroit for the surrounding suburbs during the process of white flight from the city. White flight occurred in conjunction with federal housing policy and Detroit real estate industry practices in the decades following World War II that excluded black Detroit residents from loan opportunities and confined them to neighborhoods with continually deteriorating housing.

== Bankruptcy filing ==
In June 2013, the government of Detroit stopped making payments on some of its unsecured debts, including pension obligations. In an effort to avoid bankruptcy, Orr sought to persuade some of Detroit's creditors to accept 10% of the amount they are owed. White House Press Secretary Jay Carney said, during a press conference in July, that he knew of no plans by President Obama to bail out the Detroit city government similar to the bailouts in recent years of Detroit-area automakers General Motors and Chrysler. On July 17, just one day before the bankruptcy filing, Detroit's two largest municipal pension funds filed suit in state court to prevent Orr from cutting retiree benefits as part of his efforts to cut the city's budget deficit.

After several months of negotiations, Orr was ultimately unable to come to a deal with Detroit's creditors, unions, and pension boards and therefore filed for Chapter 9 bankruptcy protection in the Eastern District of Michigan U.S. Bankruptcy Court on July 18, 2013. Snyder approved the filing by Orr in a letter attached to the court documents. Some of the named causes for the bankruptcy are the shrinking tax base caused by declining population, program costs for retiree health care and pension, borrowing to cover budget deficits (since 2008), poor record keeping and antiquated computer systems, that 47% of owners had not paid their 2011 property taxes, and government corruption. Two city workers' pension plans had for nearly 25 years been paying out "13th month" checks.

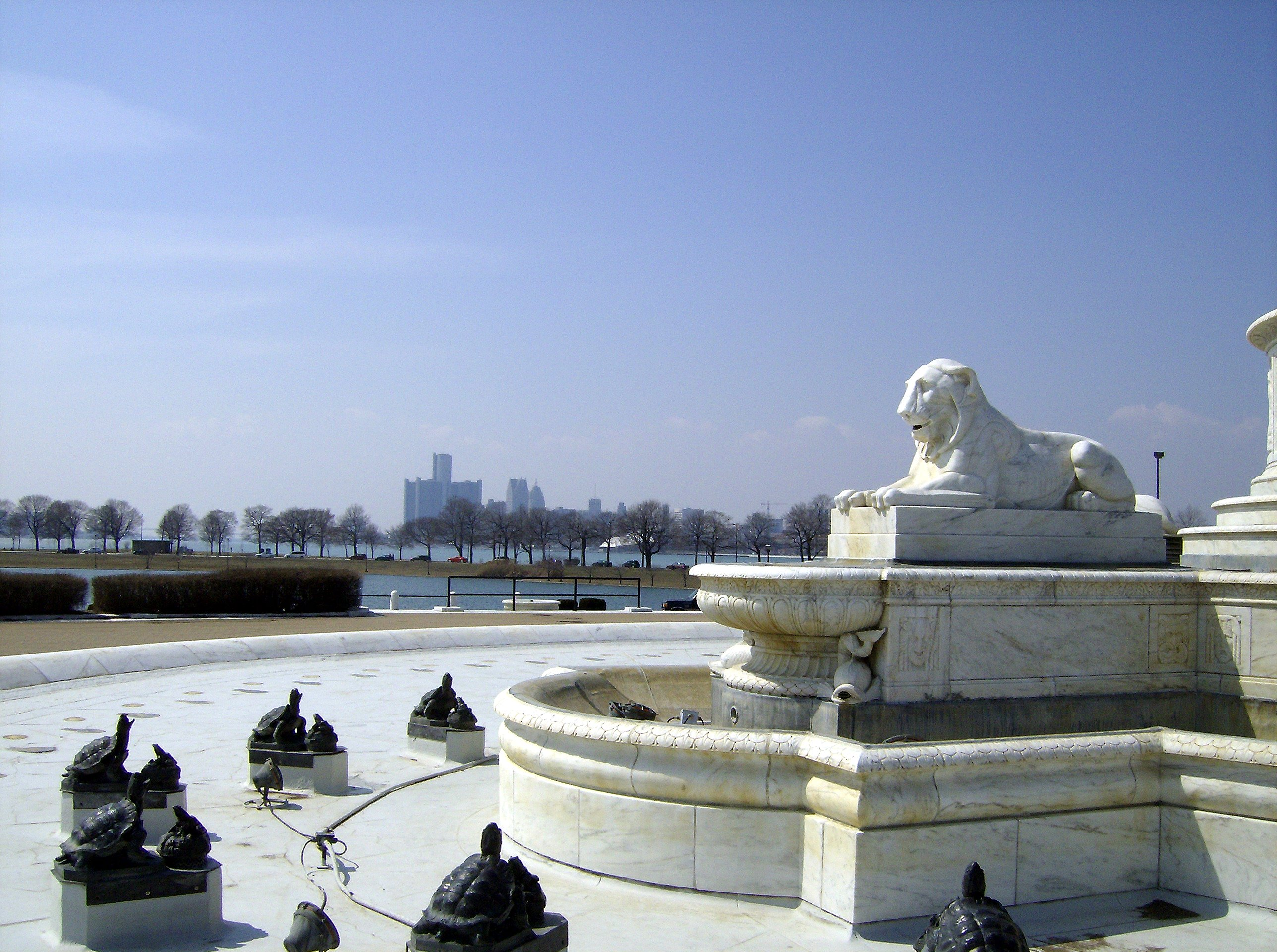
View of Downtown Detroit from Belle Isle Park, one of Detroit's several assets that cannot be sold

Bankruptcies of cities, towns, villages and counties since the Great Depression are rare (about 60 since 1950, i.e. around 1 per year; special district bankruptcies have been more numerous), and how Detroit will be affected is unclear. Detroit's estimated long-term debt was more than $14 billion and could be between $18 and $20 billion, far exceeding the $4 billion in debt of Jefferson County, Alabama, that had been the largest American municipal bankruptcy filing to date. It is also the largest city by population in U.S. history to file for bankruptcy, with more than double the population of Stockton, California, which filed for bankruptcy in 2012. State officials said that city services will not be affected immediately by the bankruptcy filing. Municipal workers with pensions are not insured by the federal Pension Benefit Guaranty Corporation, since they work for a municipality and not a business, and some also had received pensions in lieu of Social Security benefits.

According to a Detroit area bankruptcy attorney, legal costs for the bankruptcy proceedings could cost Detroit "tens of millions to hundreds of millions of dollars." Orr hopes that Detroit can emerge from bankruptcy by late Summer or Fall in 2014; he says that the process is moving as "expeditiously as possible".

Orr has considered the sale of valuable city assets, but other arrangements or regulations make it difficult to sell some of them. For instance, valuable works at the Detroit Institute of Arts cannot be sold due to private and city agreements, as well as state law; other city assets that could not be sold include the Coleman A. Young International Airport and the Belle Isle Park. Eddie Francis, the mayor of the neighboring city of Windsor, Ontario, has said that his city would consider purchasing Detroit's half of the international Detroit–Windsor Tunnel if it is offered for sale.

== Reaction ==
Yields on bonds issued by the city of Detroit increased on July 18 to record highs, as investors considered the potential effects of the bankruptcy filing. Rates had already escalated when yields jumped from 8.39% in mid-May to 16% in mid-June 2013. The credit rating agency Moody's said that the bankruptcy filing was credit negative for Detroit and that it created an "unprecedented litigation scenario," which could impact services city residents receive, as well as how much bondholders would recover from Detroit.

Business and labor leaders reacted to the filing. Detroit union leaders called Orr's move to declare bankruptcy premature due to ongoing financial negotiations with creditors, unions, and pension boards, but also stated that employees will continue to work in a typical fashion. The only major U.S. automaker headquartered in Detroit itself, General Motors, said it "is proud to call Detroit home and ... (this is) a day that we and others hoped would not come. We believe, however, that today also can mark a clean start for the city."

Politicians have commented on the bankruptcy. Bing said that the people of Detroit "have to make the best of it". Snyder stated that "I know many will see this as a low point in the city’s history," "If so, I think it will also be the foundation of the city’s future—a statement I cannot make in confidence absent giving the city a chance for a fresh start, without burdens of debt it cannot hope to fully pay." President Barack Obama said that he is following the developments and that he is "committed to continuing our strong partnership" with Detroit. Kentucky Senator Rand Paul stated that he will not allow the government to bail out the city, saying "He is bailing them out over my dead body, because we don’t have any money in Washington." Snyder also stated that he did not support a government bail out. "It's not just about putting more money in a situation," he said. "It's about better services to citizens again. It's about accountable government."

Detroit's debts included $369 million in unlimited general obligation bonds, bonds issued with the general backing of taxpayers, described by Florida bond finance director Ben Watkins as "[having] been the gold standard of the municipal-bond market". The offer by Kevyn Orr to settle these for less than 20% face value, and doubts regarding the willingness of Michigan to assume the debts, was predicted to drive up borrowing costs of nearby municipalities. This effect has been seen in regard to localities in Michigan. Three have so far had to postpone new bond offerings or face higher interest rates. However, this concern has not materialized on a wider scale, as investors have actually treated municipal general obligation bonds as safer than before the filing. Recent history from California "has shown that the fallout from a bankruptcy can dissipate quickly" in the bond market. Contributing to this is the fact that Moody's has fewer than 40 of the 7,500 local governments that it rates listed as below investment grade.

Soon after Detroit declared bankruptcy, it was reported that the city would continue with plans for a bond issue to fund a new $444 million arena for the Detroit Red Wings. Repayment of the bonds would be split between taxpayers and developers of the arena. Both Snyder and Orr acknowledged concerns raised about the expense, but stated that continuing the project makes good economic sense even with the context of Detroit's bankruptcy. With the arena, and additional retail, office, residential and hotel space the developer has committed to build as part of the overall project, it is expected to create about 8,000 construction jobs, with work due to start in 2014.

== Legal developments ==
=== From bankruptcy filing to eligibility ruling ===
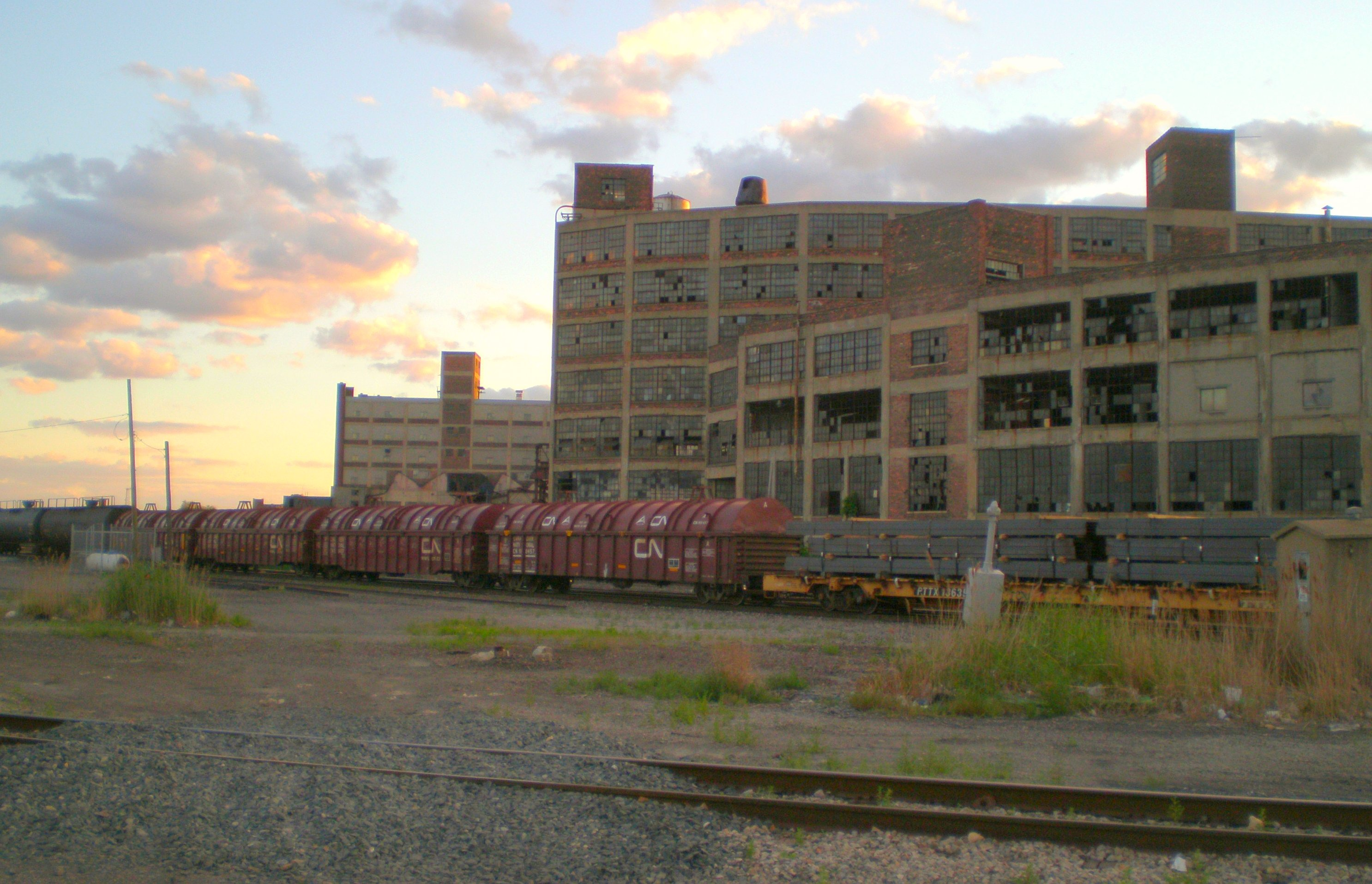
Detroit at Milwaukee Junction, looking southwest at the Russell Industrial Center

On July 19, 2013, Ingham County Circuit Court Judge Rosemarie Aquilina ruled, using a typed statement with hand-written notes attached, that the bankruptcy filing by Detroit violated the Michigan constitution by impairing pension payments and ordered Snyder to withdraw the filing: Snyder has appealed the motion, and Aquilina indicated she was sending a copy of her ruling to President Obama. While under Article IX, Section 24, of the Michigan Constitution, neither the state nor any of its "political subdivisions" are permitted to default on the accrued financial benefits of their pension plans or retirement systems, federal law may allow bankruptcy judges to renegotiate pensions of municipalities in bankruptcy. Many consider public pension benefits of existing retirees "virtually untouchable"; the clash between state constitutional protections of vested public pension rights and the general ability of the bankruptcy process to modify debt obligations has yet to be fully tested in any Chapter 9 proceeding.

On July 22, Aquilina delayed to July 29 her hearing on retiree funds request for an order directing Orr and Snyder to withdraw the bankruptcy filing and desist from any effort to reduce vested pension benefits in the face of their protected status under the Michigan Constitution. This legal move allowed the bankruptcy court to weigh in. Bankruptcy Judge Steven Rhodes scheduled a hearing on July 24, on the city's request that the retiree state court suit be stayed because of the pending federal bankruptcy case. Rhodes indicated that the bankruptcy court, not the state court, has the authority to resolve the dispute between the city and the retiree funds over the city's authorization to file the bankruptcy case.

On July 23, a three-judge panel of the Michigan Court of Appeals ruled unanimously to stay the proceedings in the state court actions, pending a resolution of the state's appeal of Aquilina's rulings directing withdrawal of the bankruptcy filing. In another development in the bankruptcy case, Rhodes indicated in a filing on July 23 his intent to appoint a mediator to work with the parties in the bankruptcy. Rhodes indicated that the mediator would be Chief Judge Gerald Rosen of the U.S. District Court for the Eastern District of Michigan.

On July 24, the bankruptcy court held a two-hour hearing on the city's request for a stay of the pending state court proceedings against Snyder and Orr. Rhodes then granted the federal stay and ruled that Orr is a validly authorized officer to act for the city in the bankruptcy. Rhodes ordered that three suits filed by city employees, retirees and pension funds in State Court be halted. He made it clear that all legal battles will be fought in the Federal Bankruptcy Court Rhodes emphasized that he was not on July 24 deciding whether the city met the statutory criteria for eligibility for a Chapter 9 filing, nor the effect on the bankruptcy case of Michigan's constitutional protection of vested public pension benefits.

On July 27, Michigan Attorney General Bill Schuette announced that he would enter an appearance in the bankruptcy case for the purpose of defending Michigan's constitutional protection of vested public pension benefits. Schuette said that in doing so he would be acting in his role as "the people's attorney." Schuette acknowledged that there is no action currently pending in the case related to public pensions, but he stated that by filing an appearance he "will be able to defend the state constitution if and when this does occur." Schuette's office also represents Snyder, who favors cuts to Detroit's public pension plans as an element of restoring the city to financial stability. Schuette's spokesperson said that his office would continue to represent the governor and other state agencies in the bankruptcy; different sets of attorneys in the attorney general's office will represent these divergent positions. A spokesperson for emergency manager Orr said that Orr "respects the attorney general’s concern for Detroit’s pensioners. This is an important issue that will be decided, appropriately, by a federal bankruptcy judge."

On August 2, the bankruptcy court held a status conference, set an initial schedule for the case, and made several initial rulings. The court set August 19 as the deadline for any party to file objections to the city's eligibility for Chapter 9 bankruptcy, and October 23 as the hearing date for trial on such objections. The court set March 1, 2014, as the deadline for the city to file a plan of adjustment for its debts. The court ordered the appointment of a fee examiner to review the fees incurred by attorneys and other professionals for the City, and invited comments on naming an appropriate person to fill this role. The court presented a proposed order establishing a mediation process aimed at facilitating settlement of disputed issues that will arise in the case, and inviting comments on the naming of an appropriate mediator, with the court having initially proposed Chief Judge Gerald Rosen of the U.S. District Court for the Eastern District of Michigan. The court ordered the Office of the U.S. Trustee to appoint an official committee to represent retired employees of the city, with the U.S. Trustee to select the members to serve on this Retiree Committee. The professional expenses of the Retiree Committee will be paid by the city, which consented to do so. When a fee examiner is appointed, the professional expenses of the Retiree Committee will also be subject to the examiner's review. On August 19, Rhodes appointed Robert M. Fishman, an attorney with the Chicago law firm Shaw Fishman Glantz and Tobin, as the fee examiner. Fishman's own fees are charged at $600 per hour. Another attorney who has served as an expert witness in fee matters commented that, while the fees will no doubt be large, legal fees are always a small percentage of what is at stake in a bankruptcy of this magnitude.

On August 13, Judge Rhodes, after receiving input from various parties in the bankruptcy, confirmed his appointment of Judge Rosen of the District Court to serve as a mediator in the Chapter 9 case process. The mediator may bring parties together for "facilitative mediation" on any issues that Rhodes chooses to refer to mediation. Any mediation proceedings held will be confidential, except for the terms of any settlement that may be reached and presented to the bankruptcy court for approval. On August 21, Rosen - as permitted by Rhodes's order appointing him - appointed additional mediators to assist him. As Rosen said, mediation in this case will amount to a monumental task, involving "thousands of claims and issues." The additional mediators are: U.S. District Judge Victoria Roberts, a Detroit native who is also an adjunct professor at the University of Michigan Law School; U.S. Bankruptcy Judge Elizabeth Perris of the District of Oregon, who has served almost 30 years as judge and has been a judicial mediator in the Chapter 9 bankruptcies of Vallejo, Stockton and Mammoth Lakes, Calif.; Senior U.S. District Judge Wiley Daniel of the District of Colorado, a former Detroit resident; former U.S. Bankruptcy and U.S. District Judge David Coar, who has also served as a private mediator in large bankruptcy cases, including the Mammoth Lakes, Calif., Chapter 9; and Eugene Driker, also a Detroit native, who is "considered a leading mediator in Michigan."

On August 19, the deadline set by the bankruptcy court, 109 objections were filed to Detroit's eligibility for Chapter 9. Among the more prominent objectors were the Retired City Employees Association and Joint Retired Detroit Police and Fire Fighters Association, the UAW, the AFSCME, the city's General Retirement System and Police and Fire Retirement System, the Detroit Fire Fighters Association and the Detroit Police Officers Association (and two levels of associations of higher-ranking police officers). Numerous individuals were also among those filing objections, including some in the form of handwritten letters. Attorney General Schuette filed a statement that his office does not contest Detroit's eligibility for Chapter 9, but does object, and will continue to object, to Detroit's ability through the bankruptcy process to diminish its retiree pension benefits in light of the Michigan state constitutional prohibition against impairment of these vested obligations. Notably, bondholder representatives and municipal bond insurance companies chose not to file an objection to eligibility. This is despite Kevyn Orr's stated intention to treat approximately $2 billion of general obligation bond debt as unsecured, which would likely result in substantial losses to the bond parties. Frank Schafroth, director of the Center for State and Local Leadership at George Mason University, commented that the choice not to object on eligibility reflected lessons learned in the Stockton, California, Chapter 9 case. There, bondholders and bond insurers did wage a months-long litigation effort to have Stockton declared ineligible. But this expensive and time-consuming effort proved unsuccessful. An attorney for some of the bondholders in Detroit's case commented that they felt it was better to have the bankruptcy judge as a referee rather than to deal only with Orr on the terms of his severe pre-bankruptcy proposal to the bond groups.

Judge Rhodes ordered that initial argument on the purely legal issues of Detroit's eligibility for Chapter 9 be held on October 15–16, rather than the October 23 date of the full trial on eligibility. Rhodes declared early consideration of the purely legal issues, such as Detroit's authorization under state law for the bankruptcy filing, would expedite determination of eligibility under the Bankruptcy Code. At the same time, Rhodes reserved issues requiring factual determinations, such as whether Detroit negotiated in good faith with its creditors before filing the bankruptcy case, for the October 23 trial.

On December 3, Judge Rhodes ruled Detroit eligible for bankruptcy protection. In his ruling the judge determined that Detroit is insolvent, and that the city could not have practically negotiated on a plan of adjustment pre-bankruptcy with its thousands of creditors. The judge declined to find that the city had negotiated in good faith with creditors pre-bankruptcy, based on the testimony at the eligibility trial; he noted that the meetings the city held with creditors leading up to the bankruptcy filing did not meet the statutory good-faith requirement. However, he found the city eligible for Chapter 9 on the statutory alternative ground of impracticability of negotiating with so many creditors. The judge also found that the city could potentially impair the pensions of city retirees through a plan under federal bankruptcy law, despite the Michigan state constitutional provision protecting such pensions from impairment.

Judge Rhodes followed the announcement of his ruling in open court with a 143-page written memorandum opinion providing the bases for the ruling. The memorandum discusses in detail the financial status of the city. It reviews the statutory criteria for eligibility and indicates those the city satisfied, and finds that the city met the minimum criteria for eligibility. The memorandum discusses in depth the major objections raised by various parties to the city's eligibility, and finds that the objections are either unfounded in law or insufficient factually to deny the city eligibility for Chapter 9. The judge concluded the memorandum with a reminder to all interested parties that eligibility is only a preliminary step in a Chapter 9 case, and that the "ultimate objective is confirmation of a plan of adjustment....the Court strongly encourages the parties to begin to negotiate, or if they have already begun, to continue to negotiate, with a view toward a consensual plan."

=== Appeal of eligibility ruling ===
Judge Rhodes declined to stay the effect of his eligibility ruling while any potential appeals are decided. He also indicated that he would consider permission for an appeal to proceed directly to the U.S. Court of Appeals for the Sixth Circuit, rather than the regular route of an appeal first to the federal district court, in a separate motion. AFSCME immediately filed a notice of appeal of the ruling. It is expected that the independently managed pension funds for city workers will join in the appeal. Detroit's teachers' union will appeal the bankruptcy ruling according to Randi Weingarten, national president of the American Federation of Teachers. On December 16, 2013, Judge Rhodes granted motions by AFSCME and the pension funds permitting direct appeal to the Sixth Circuit. The permission includes the ruling on eligibility for Chapter 9, and the ruling that the city can impair vested public pension benefits through a Chapter 9 plan.

=== Fee controversy ===
As of October 1, 2013, Detroit had spent almost $23 million in fees to lawyers, consultants and financial advisers for the bankruptcy. Some of the fees are:

- $11 million to law firm Jones Day
- $4.59 million to Conway MacKenzie, a Detroit area restructuring firm
- $4.17 million to Ernst & Young, accounting firm
- $1.5 million to Plante Moran, accounting firm
- $1.2 million to Miller Buckfire, investment banking firm

Orr used $95 million earmarked for unsecured bond debt and pension payments to Detroit's restructuring initiatives, which caused Detroit to first miss bond payments in June 2013.

Fees paid to three Jones Day partners who billed the city for more than $1,000 per hour of their time, as well as for trips to or from vacation homes, proved particularly controversial, but their former partner Kevyn Orr did not consider them overbilling. On December 31, city officials disclosed that the city's general fund paid $164.91 million in fees relating to the bankruptcy, although they did not reveal concessions made by various parties pursuant to a mediation order, said to be worth about $25 million. The city's plan of adjustment allotted $177 million for legal and consulting fees. Disclosed fees included:

- $57.9 million to Jones Day,
- $17.28 million to Conway MacKenzie for operational restructuring
- $20.22 million to Ernst & Young for financial restructuring
- $22.82 million to investment banking firm Miller Buckfire, and
- $15.41 million to Dentons US LLP, a law firm that acted on behalf of an official committee of city retirees fighting pension cuts
- $980,000 went to two Detroit mediator firms

Furthermore, the two pension funds paid attorneys at Clark Hill $6.25 million and financial advisers at Greenhill & Co. $5.71 million to fight the bankruptcy case. Judge Rhodes, whose judicial salary is set by Congress, had up to 14 days to determine whether the agreed-upon fees are reasonable.

=== City's plan of adjustment of debts ===
After the Chapter 9 eligibility ruling, emergency manager Kevyn Orr said the city will seek to file a plan for adjustment of its debts under bankruptcy law by early January. Orr said that negotiations with unions for the city's workers on the terms of a possible plan were continuing. The plan was approved by the United States Bankruptcy Court in November 2014.

== The Grand Bargain and the end of bankruptcy ==
One of the biggest issues facing litigators of Detroit's bankruptcy was which assets belong to the city outright and those that were available to creditors in order to satisfy liabilities. Nowhere did this question loom larger than the fate of the Detroit Institute of Arts. The DIA holds 66,000 valuable pieces; however, only five percent of this collection was bought with city money. Judge Rhodes had to decide if the other 95% of this collection could be monetized in order to satisfy the claims of the bankruptcy creditors. Of particular interest was whether the art collection would be needed to satisfy the pension claims of its retirees.

Chief Judge for the Eastern District Michigan Gerald Rosen, who had taken on the role of chief mediator, and Rhodes sought a quick end to the bankruptcy fearing a process that could take years to resolve. On November 5, 2013 Rosen convened a meeting at the federal courthouse in Detroit with the leaders of some of the largest foundations in the country. Among those in attendance were the Ford, Kresge, Knight and Mott Foundations. It was here that Rosen laid out his plan that would become known as the Grand Bargain. Rosen's plan sought commitments for over $800 million over the next 20 years from foundations, private donors, the DIA, and the state that would be used to shore up underfunded pensions. This would save the DIA from selling its art; the DIA would then become a private organization, releasing it from city ownership and protecting its collection forever.

When asked why they donated, Darren Walker, president of the Ford Foundation said "If you don't have great cities, you won't have great nations," he said. "Detroit is a metaphor for America, for America's challenges and America's opportunities. It is a hothouse for new innovation, for ingenuity and risk taking. That doesn't happen in a lot of American cities. We need to be in Detroit because of that." In total foundations would commit $366 million over 20 years to the Foundation for Detroit's Future, the non-profit set up to act as the fiduciary for the funds.

On December 22, Rosen rejected a $230 million settlement negotiated between the city and Bank of America Merrill Lynch and UBS. The city owed the banks $290 million due to the investment by former mayor Kwame Kilpatrick. The city and banks would settle, on the 24th, for $185 million in the Rosen-negotiated deal. Rhodes would later stun those following the proceedings, in what would be known as the Christmas Eve Massacre, when he rejected the settlement three weeks later, saying that it was "just too high a price to pay." After Orr threatened to sue the two banks, they eventually settled for $85 million. By January 2014, the city would reach a deal with some of its toughest opponents (three bond insurers) to whom they owed $388 million on the city's general obligation bonds by agreeing to pay 74%.

The DIA initially offered $50 million toward the Grand Bargain; the city, governor and others pushing for the deal viewed that as too low to get the state legislature on board. Ultimately, the DIA would agree to contribute $100 million.

In May 2014, legislation was introduced giving Detroit's retirement systems a $194.8 million lump sum as part of the state's $350 million commitment. If pensioners accepted the deal, they would not be able to sue the state over pension reductions; this was seen as a critical step toward getting support from the Republican-majority legislature. Some Republicans, such as Speaker of the House Jase Bolger, wanted unions to make contributions to help in the Detroit settlement. Another condition sought was that of a financial review commission modeled after the New York State Financial Control Board that oversaw New York City's troubled finances during the 1970s and 80s. After unions agreed to contribute money towards the settlement, the Michigan House passed legislation with major bipartisan support on May 22. Governor Snyder called the legislative package an opportunity to change the direction of Detroit. The state Senate would follow on June 3 and soon after. Upon passage, the Detroit News called the final legislative package a "grand piece of work," and the Detroit Free Press opined that the deal showed lawmakers "get it.". In total, Judge Rosen's plan was able to raise $816 million from the various entities to create the Grand Bargain.

Early in negotiations, the city's retirees saw themselves threatened with cuts of 50%. However, the grand bargain reduced those cuts to 4.5%, with no cost living increases. Over the spring and summer of 2014, more than two-thirds of Detroit retirees voted in favor of the deal.

On September 10, Detroit reached a deal with three Michigan counties over regional water and sewer services that could eliminate one roadblock to federal court approval of the city's plan to adjust its debt and exit bankruptcy. The deal with Oakland, Wayne and Macomb counties created the Great Lakes Water Authority, a new regional water and sewer authority, but allowed Detroit to maintain control of its local system. The deal was crucial to adjusting the city's $18 billion of debt and helping it exit its historically unprecedented municipal bankruptcy.

Detroit would reach deals with more of its creditors throughout the fall. In September it came to terms with bond insurer Syncora on its $400 million claim; Syncora would receive $25 million in cash and bonds, as well as a 20-year lease extension on their P3 operation of the Detroit-Windsor Tunnel and 30-year lease of the underground garage at Grand Circus Park.

On October 16, lawyers for the city and Financial Guaranty Insurance Company (FGIC), a bond insurer with a $1 billion claim, disclosed in court that they had reached a deal to settle the company's claims. Under the deal, the city and state would pay for the demolition of the city-owned Joe Louis Arena once the Red Wings move into the new arena. After demolition, FGIC would receive the arena site and an adjacent parking lot, giving the company nearly 9 acres (3.6 ha) for redevelopment.

On November 7, 2014, Judge Rhodes accepted the city's plan of adjustment, 17 months after the city had filed bankruptcy—a far shorter time frame that had been predicted based on other municipal bankruptcies. At the hearing Rhodes remarked, "We have used the phrase 'the Grand Bargain' to describe the group of agreements that will fix the city's pension problem. That description is entirely fitting. In our nation, we join together in the promise and in the ideal of a much grander bargain. It is the bargain by which we interact with each other and with our government, all for the common good. That grander bargain, enshrined in our Constitution, is democracy. It is now time to restore democracy to the people of the City of Detroit".

On December 10, 2014, the ownership of DIA transferred to the non-profit DIA, Inc. The following day Detroit exited bankruptcy protection with finances returned to the control of city, subject to three years of oversight by the Detroit Financial Review Commission.

== Detroit after bankruptcy ==
In the years following the bankruptcy filing in 2013 and subsequent bargaining, there has been major private investment and development in Detroit, including in the downtown, Midtown, riverfront, Corktown, and New Center areas. Many development projects have received government subsidies or tax breaks from the city.

While development has increased, Detroit continues to face financial problems as well as continued housing foreclosures and unemployment, particularly in the area of the city outside of the 7.2 square miles in the center of the city where development is occurring. Housing foreclosures persisted after the bankruptcy, with a 30% tax delinquency rate in 2015. Provision of city services are also a problem due to old infrastructure, low tax revenue, and a smaller population spread across the city area. Still, it has been less than a decade since Detroit emerged from bankruptcy on paper, and many of these problems have roots beyond the bankruptcy. A Forbes article published in 2018 notes that “Detroit has yet to witness the full economic impact of its resurgence,” predicting an additional five to ten years of rebuilding.

Further challenges also emerged. During the COVID-19 pandemic, loss of city revenue from casinos and unemployment created another budget deficit. In addition to layoffs of city employees and reductions in hours and wages, Mayor Mike Duggan has cut funding used to destroy blighted and vacant buildings around the city to prevent the deficit from reaching the 5% city revenue threshold for another state intervention in city finances.

== See also ==
- History of Detroit
- Partial list of chapter 9 bankruptcies of the United States.
- History of New York City (1946–77): During the 1970s, New York City received a federal loan to avoid filing for bankruptcy under the administration of President Gerald Ford.
- Flint, Michigan financial emergency
- Municipal bond
- Financial emergency in Michigan
