= New Energy to Reinvent and Diversify Fund =

Political fund

The New Energy to Reinvent and Diversify Fund or NERD fund was developed through State of Michigan Governor Rick Snyder's office in 2011. Developed through a 501c4 organization, the purpose of the fund was to subsidize government expenses from unlimited anonymous corporate donations. The fund gathered $1.3 million in 2011 and another $368,000 in 2012. On October 21, 2013, it was announced that the NERD fund would close down.

The NERD fund was used to support politically sensitive projects for the State of Michigan. Mlive reports "The fund has been used to upgrade an auditorium in the governor's offices, buy an alarm system for his house, pay travel expenses for his staff and cover living expenses for Detroit Emergency Manager Kevyn Orr". Richard Baird, who assisted with several sensitive projects at the request of Governor Snyder, was paid through the NERD fund; Baird will instead be appointed transformational manager for the Governor's office.

== Controversy ==
Since its inception, the NERD fund was criticized for the anonymity of its donors. This criticism is the primary reason stated for closing the fund.
