= Susan K. DeClercq =

American judge (born 1974)

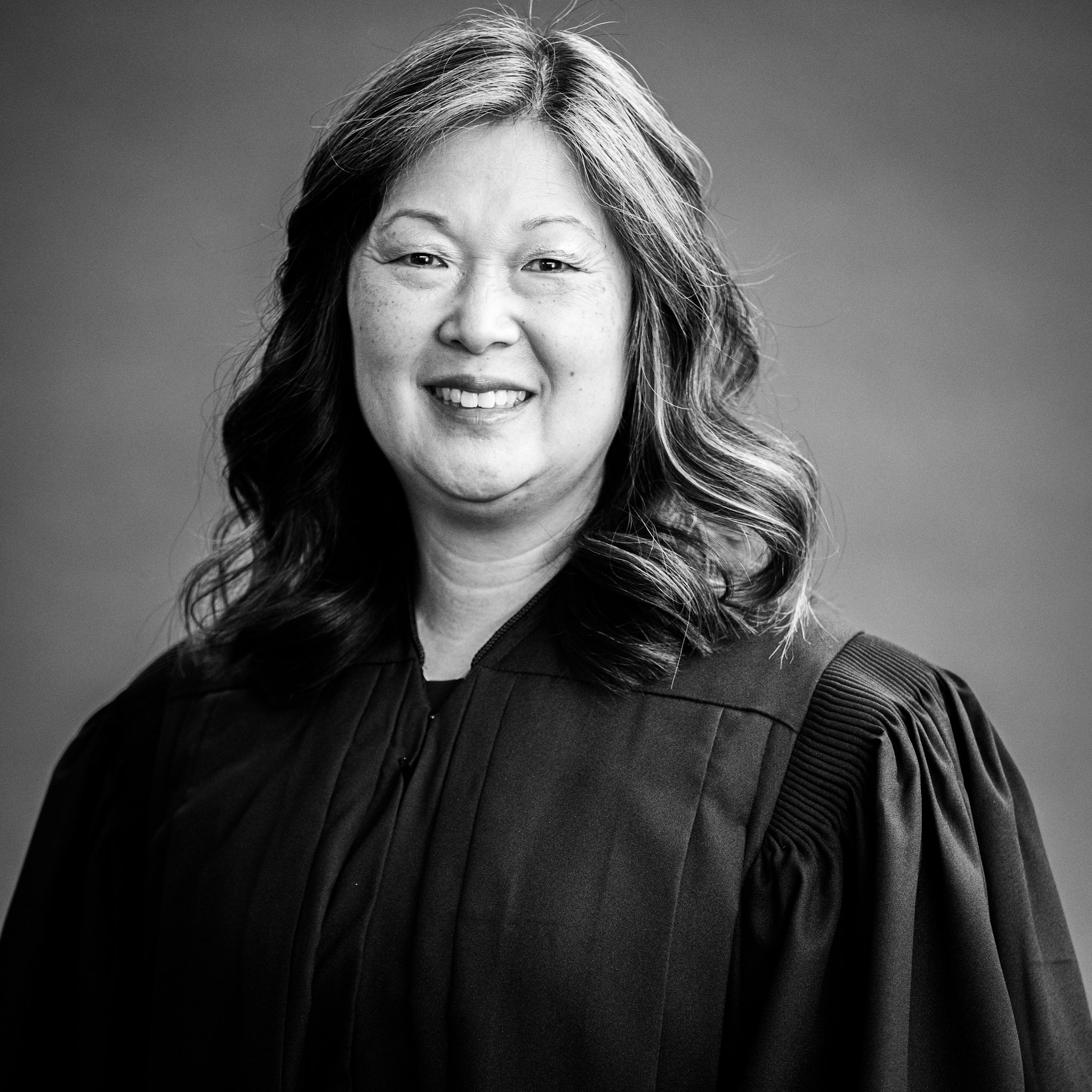

Judge of the United States District Court for the Eastern District of Michigan
- Incumbent
- Assumed office November 9, 2023
- Appointed by: Joe Biden
- Preceded by: Stephanie D. Davis

Personal details
- Born: Sun Jin Kim; 1974 (age 51–52) Seoul, South Korea
- Education: University of Michigan (BA); Wayne State University (JD)

Susan Kim DeClercq (née Kim; born 1974) is an American lawyer from Michigan who is serving as a United States district judge of the United States District Court for the Eastern District of Michigan.

== Early life and education ==
DeClercq's biological mother left her on the steps of a hospital in Seoul, South Korea, and she was adopted and raised by a single mother in the United States. DeClercq received a Bachelor of Arts from the University of Michigan in 1995 and a Juris Doctor, magna cum laude, from Wayne State University Law School in 1999.

== Career ==
From 1999 to 2001, DeClercq served as a law clerk for Judge Avern Cohn of the United States District Court for the Eastern District of Michigan. From 2001 to 2004, she was a litigation associate at Skadden, Arps, Slate, Meagher & Flom in Washington, D.C. From 2004 to 2022, she was an assistant United States attorney in the U.S. Attorney's Office for the Eastern District of Michigan. She served as Chief of the Civil Division and Chief of the Civil Rights Unit in her role, enforcing laws prohibiting discrimination. From 2022 to 2023, she was a director and counsel of special investigations at Ford Motor Company in Dearborn, Michigan.

=== Federal judicial service ===
On May 3, 2023, President Joe Biden announced his intent to nominate DeClercq to serve as a United States district judge of the United States District Court for the Eastern District of Michigan. On May 4, 2023, her nomination was sent to the Senate. President Biden nominated DeClercq to the seat vacated by Judge Stephanie D. Davis, who was elevated to the United States Court of Appeals for the Sixth Circuit on June 14, 2022. On June 7, 2023, a hearing on her nomination was held before the Senate Judiciary Committee. On July 13, 2023, her nomination was reported out of the committee by a 12–9 vote. On October 4, 2023, the United States Senate invoked cloture on her nomination by a 54–44 vote. Later that day, her nomination was confirmed by a 52–42 vote. She received her judicial commission on November 9, 2023. She was sworn in on November 13, 2023. DeClercq is the first federal judge of East Asian descent in Michigan.

== See also ==
- List of Asian American jurists

Legal offices
Preceded by Stephanie D. Davis	Judge of the United States District Court for the Eastern District of Michigan; 2023–present	Incumbent
