= Stephanie D. Davis =

American judge (born 1967)

Stephanie Davis
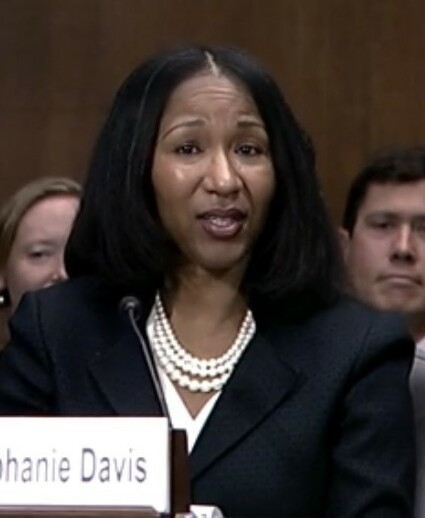

Judge of the United States Court of Appeals for the Sixth Circuit
- Incumbent
- Assumed office June 14, 2022
- Appointed by: Joe Biden
- Preceded by: Helene White

Judge of the United States District Court for the Eastern District of Michigan
- In office December 31, 2019 – June 14, 2022
- Appointed by: Donald Trump
- Preceded by: Gerald Ellis Rosen
- Succeeded by: Susan K. DeClercq

Personal details
- Born: Stephanie Renaye Dawkins; 1967 (age 58–59) Kansas City, Missouri, U.S.
- Children: 3
- Education: Wichita State University (BS); Washington University (JD)

Stephanie Dawkins Davis (née Dawkins; born 1967) is an American lawyer who is serving as a United States circuit judge of the United States Court of Appeals for the Sixth Circuit. She previously served as a United States district judge of the United States District Court for the Eastern District of Michigan and a former United States magistrate judge of the same court.

== Early life and education ==
Davis is a native of Kansas City, Kansas, where she was raised as an only child by a single mother. She graduated from F. L. Schlagle High School. Davis received a Bachelor of Science from Wichita State University in 1989 and her Juris Doctor from the Washington University School of Law in 1992. She became interested in the law as a young student in Kansas because of Brown v. Board of Education (1954).

== Career ==
Davis began her legal career in products liability and commercial law at Dickinson Wright in Detroit, where she was mentored by future Michigan Supreme Court Justice Mary Beth Kelly. She left private practice to join the U.S. Attorney's Office for the Eastern District of Michigan in 1997, where she served in both the civil and criminal divisions. She spent 18 years working in the U.S. Attorney's Office, prosecuting cases at both the trial and appellate levels, and serving as a deputy unit chief of the Controlled Substances Unit and high-intensity drug trafficking area liaison. Davis was a member of the American Constitution Society from 2008 and 2016. She also served as the executive assistant U.S. attorney under then-U.S. Attorney Barbara McQuade from 2010 to 2015. Davis serves on the advisory board for University of Detroit Mercy School of Law.

== Federal judicial service ==
=== United States magistrate judge ===
In January 2016, she became a magistrate judge for the United States District Court for the Eastern District of Michigan. During her tenure, she arraigned Amor Ftouhi for his role in the 2017 Bishop International Airport attack. Her service as a magistrate judge ended on December 31, 2019, when she was elevated to district court judge.

=== District court service ===
In December 2017, Davis was recommended to the Trump administration by Democratic U.S. Senators Debbie Stabenow and Gary Peters. On March 8, 2019, President Donald Trump announced his intent to nominate Davis to serve as a United States district judge for the Eastern District of Michigan as part of a bipartisan package of nominees which included Michael S. Bogren. On March 11, 2019, President Trump nominated Davis to the seat vacated by Judge Gerald Ellis Rosen, who assumed senior status on October 26, 2016. On May 22, 2019, a hearing on her nomination was held before the Senate Judiciary Committee. On June 20, 2019, her nomination was favorably reported by the Senate Judiciary Committee by a voice vote. On December 16, 2019, Majority Leader Mitch McConnell filed cloture on her nomination. On December 18, 2019, the United States Senate invoked cloture on her nomination by a 90–1 vote. On December 19, 2019, her nomination was confirmed by a voice vote. She received her judicial commission on December 31, 2019, and was sworn in later that same day. Her service was terminated on June 14, 2022, when she was elevated to the court of appeals.

=== Court of appeals service ===
On February 2, 2022, President Joe Biden nominated Davis to serve as a United States circuit judge for the Sixth Circuit. President Biden nominated Davis to the seat to be vacated by Judge Helene White, who announced her intent to assume senior status upon confirmation of a successor. On March 2, 2022, a hearing on her nomination was held before the Senate Judiciary Committee. On April 4, 2022, her nomination was favorably reported by the committee by a 13–9 vote. On May 17, 2022, Majority Leader Chuck Schumer filed cloture on her nomination. On May 19, 2022, the United States Senate invoked cloture on her nomination by a 48–36 vote. On May 24, 2022, her nomination was confirmed by a 49–43 vote. She received her judicial commission on June 14, 2022. She is the first African-American woman from Michigan to serve on the Sixth Circuit.

== Personal life ==
Davis is married to an engineer and has three adult children.

== See also ==
- List of African American federal judges
- List of African American jurists

Legal offices
Preceded by Gerald Ellis Rosen	Judge of the United States District Court for the Eastern District of Michigan; 2019–2022	Succeeded by Susan K. DeClercq
Preceded by Helene White	Judge of the United States Court of Appeals for the Sixth Circuit; 2022–present	Incumbent
