= Philip Pratt =

American judge

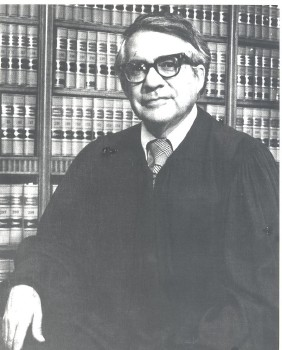

Chief Judge of the United States District Court for the Eastern District of Michigan
- In office 1986–1989
- Preceded by: John Feikens
- Succeeded by: James Paul Churchill

Judge of the United States District Court for the Eastern District of Michigan
- In office December 1, 1970 – February 7, 1989
- Appointed by: Richard Nixon
- Preceded by: Seat established by 84 Stat. 294
- Succeeded by: Gerald Ellis Rosen

Personal details
- Born: Philip Pratt; July 14, 1924 Pontiac, Michigan
- Died: February 7, 1989 (aged 64) Bloomfield Hills, Michigan
- Education: University of Michigan Law School (LL.B.)

Philip Pratt (July 14, 1924 – February 7, 1989) was a United States district judge of the United States District Court for the Eastern District of Michigan.

== Education and career ==
Born in Pontiac, Michigan, Pratt was in the United States Army as a Sergeant in the Office of Strategic Services during World War II, from 1943 to 1946. He received a Bachelor of Laws from the University of Michigan Law School in 1950. He was a title examiner in the Abstract and Title department in Pontiac from 1950 to 1951. He was an assistant prosecutor for Oakland County, Michigan from 1952 to 1953. He was in private practice in Pontiac from 1953 to 1963. He was a judge of the 6th Judicial Circuit Court of Michigan from 1963 to 1970.

== Federal judicial service ==
Pratt was nominated by President Richard Nixon on October 7, 1970, to the United States District Court for the Eastern District of Michigan, to a new seat created by 84 Stat. 294. He was confirmed by the United States Senate on November 25, 1970, and received his commission on December 1, 1970. He served as Chief Judge from 1986 to 1989. Pratt served in that capacity until his death of cancer on February 7, 1989, at his home in Bloomfield Hills, Michigan.

== Sources ==
Legal offices
Preceded by Seat established by 84 Stat. 294	Judge of the United States District Court for the Eastern District of Michigan; 1970–1989	Succeeded by Gerald Ellis Rosen
Preceded by John Feikens	Chief Judge of the United States District Court for the Eastern District of Michigan; 1986–1989	Succeeded by James Paul Churchill
