= Gerald E. Rosen =

American judge (born 1951)

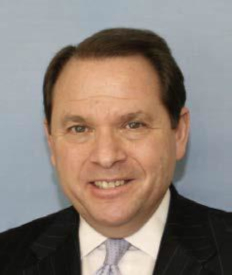

Senior Judge of the United States District Court for the Eastern District of Michigan
- In office October 26, 2016 – January 31, 2017

Chief Judge of the United States District Court for the Eastern District of Michigan
- In office 2009 – December 31, 2015
- Preceded by: Bernard A. Friedman
- Succeeded by: Denise Page Hood

Judge of the United States District Court for the Eastern District of Michigan
- In office March 12, 1990 – October 26, 2016
- Appointed by: George H. W. Bush
- Preceded by: Philip Pratt
- Succeeded by: Stephanie D. Davis

Personal details
- Born: Gerald Ellis Rosen; October 26, 1951 (age 74) Chandler, Arizona
- Party: Republican
- Education: Kalamazoo College (BA); George Washington University Law School (JD)

Gerald Ellis Rosen (born October 26, 1951) is a former United States district judge of the United States District Court for the Eastern District of Michigan.

== Professional career ==
Prior to taking the bench, Rosen was a senior partner in the law firm of Miller, Canfield, Paddock and Stone. While at Miller Canfield, Rosen was a trial lawyer, specializing in commercial, employment and constitutional litigation and litigated a number of important, high-profile cases.

He began his professional career in Washington, D.C. as a Legislative Assistant to United States Senator Robert P. Griffin of Michigan. Rosen served on Senator Griffin's staff in Washington for five years, from February 1974 through January 1979, during which time he was intimately involved in some of the most significant and challenging issues of the period. While serving as Senator Griffin's Legislative Assistant, Rosen attended the George Washington University Law School at night, and obtained his Juris Doctor in May 1979. (He is now a member of the Law School's Board of Advisors). Rosen obtained his Bachelor of Arts degree from Kalamazoo College.

== Published writings ==
Rosen has written and published articles for professional journals and the popular press on a wide range of issues, including civil procedure, evidence, due process, criminal law, labor law and legal advertising, as well as numerous other topics. He is also a co-author of Federal Civil Trials and Evidence, Federal Employment Litigation and Michigan Civil Trials and Evidence and is the Senior Editor of West Publishing Company's Michigan Practice Guide series. For five years prior to taking the Bench, Judge Rosen co-chaired the Judicial Evaluation Committee for the U.S. District Court for the Eastern District of Michigan. In 1982, Judge Rosen was the Republican candidate for Congress in Michigan's 17th congressional district, losing to Congressman Sander Levin (D. Mi.).

== Academic career ==
For eighteen years, Judge Rosen has been an adjunct professor of law, teaching evidence at University of Michigan Law School, Wayne State University Law School, University of Detroit Law School and Thomas M. Cooley Law School. Judge Rosen frequently lectures at continuing legal education seminars for both lawyers and State and Federal Judges. He has also lectured at numerous International conferences, and represented the United States government as part of the U.S. State Department's Rule of Law program in Moscow, Russia and Tbilisi, Georgia, consulting with legal scholars and judges from those nations on the draft of their constitutions and organization of their legal system. Most recently, he lectured to high-ranking Chinese Judges at the Supreme People's Court in Beijing, China and Egyptian judges in Cairo, as well as lecturing at Hebrew University of Jerusalem.

== Federal judicial service ==
Rosen was nominated by George H. W. Bush on November 9, 1989, to the United States District Court for the Eastern District of Michigan to a seat vacated by Philip Pratt. He was confirmed by the Senate on March 9, 1990, and received his commission on March 12, 1990. He served as Chief Judge of the Court from 2009 to 2015. He assumed senior status on October 26, 2016, on his 65th birthday. He retired from active service on January 31, 2017.

From 1995 to 2001, Judge Rosen served on the U.S. Judicial Conference's Committee on Criminal Law. As a member of that Committee, he was actively involved in developing sentencing and criminal law and procedure policy for the Judicial Branch of the US Government. Rosen was also selected by his colleagues to serve on the Board of Directors of the Federal Judges Association.

== Interests ==
Beyond his professional work, Judge Rosen is involved with several charitable and community organizations, including serving on the Board of Directors of Focus: HOPE and the Michigan Chapter of the Federalist Society.

== Sources ==
- FJC Bio
- Biography

Legal offices
Preceded by Philip Pratt	Judge of the United States District Court for the Eastern District of Michigan; 1990–2016	Succeeded by Stephanie D. Davis
Preceded by Bernard A. Friedman	Chief Judge of the United States District Court for the Eastern District of Michigan; 2009–2015	Succeeded by Denise Page Hood
