= Community displacement =

Community displacement is the movement of a population out of a neighborhood as formal or informal redevelopment occurs. Community displacement is a key argument against informal and formal urban renewal projects. The implication is that the benefits calculus undervalues the interests of the community residents who will be displaced.

== Terminology ==
The 1949 Housing Act described the movement of populations out of blighted areas as planned shrinkage. The academic literature describes this movement as serial displacement. Recently, the terms urban displacement and community displacement are used commonly.

=== Related terms ===
Community displacement is used to describe movement in urban areas, while development-induced displacement typically describes movement connected with rural projects, such as dam projects. Community displacement should not be confused with white flight, a phenomenon whereby white residents voluntarily move away from an area as it increases in racial diversity.

== Causes ==
The predominant generator of population displacement is government sponsored projects: new highways, education campuses, hospitals, and other urban renewal projects. Housing projects may displace people temporarily. In the 1960s, the preference was for high-density projects which did not result in net displacement. Low-density projects may or may not cause a net displacement.

Community displacement may be a result of gentrification, the informal redevelopment that occurs when new, and typically richer people, move into a neighborhood. It is the result of urban redevelopment of a residential neighborhood to non-residential uses including retail, education, healthcare, and transportation. However, community displacement is not the same thing as gentrification. It may be a byproduct, but it is not a necessary result. New York City's gentrification of the financial district produced no outflow of population. It did not significantly change the cost of living in the neighborhood.

== Effects ==
It is often criticized because displaced residents have limited options to buy or rent equivalent housing in alternative areas at the same price. If they stay, prices for products, services, and taxes in the local area rise and existing social networks are disturbed.

Economist Lance Freeman concluded that displacement plays a minor role, if any, as a force of change in gentrifying neighborhoods.
