= Demographic history of Detroit =

Demographics of Detroit
- Population pyramid of Detroit in 2021
- Population: 639,111 (2020)

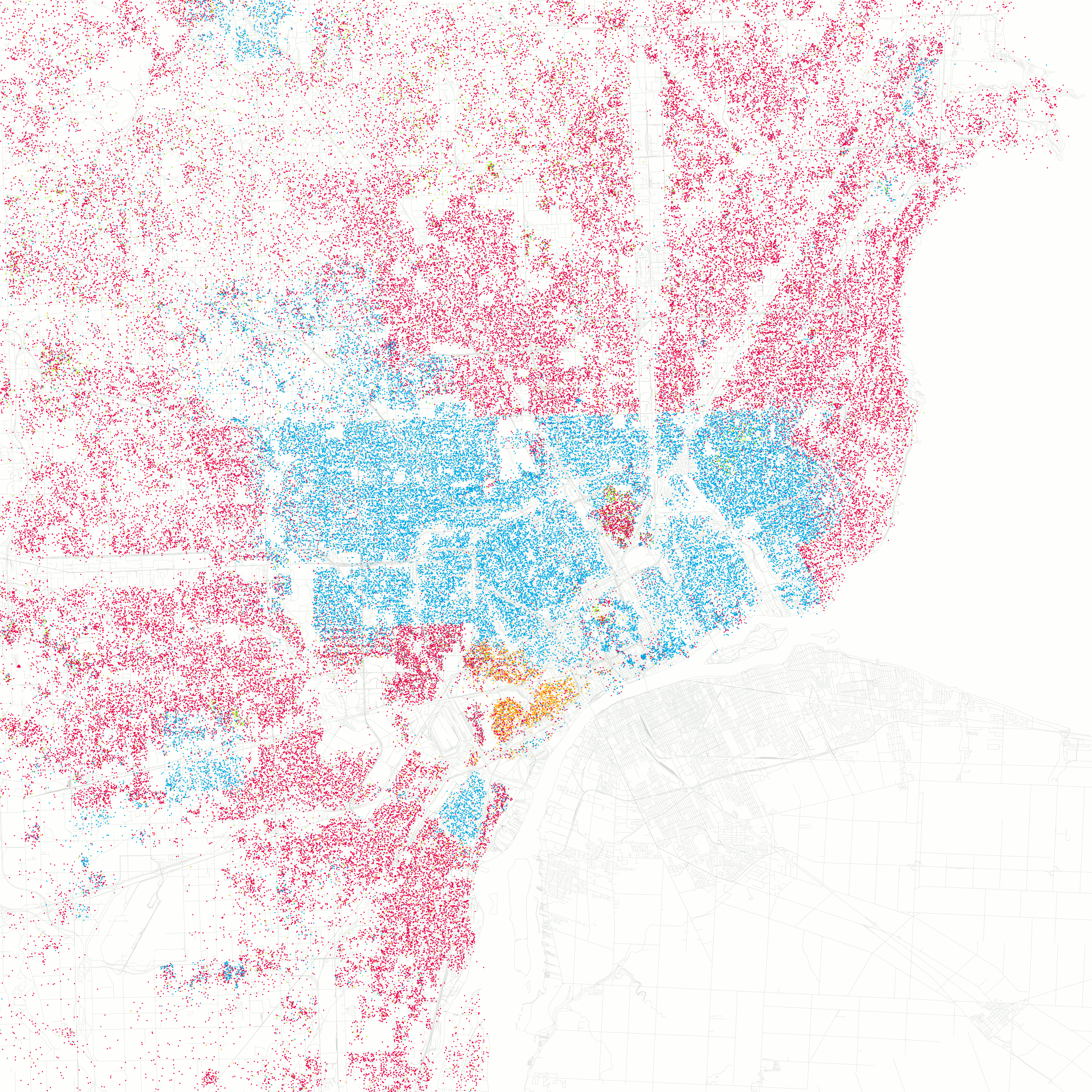
Race and ethnicity in Detroit as of the 2000 census. Each dot is 25 people. The map shows the heavy legacy of historic segregation in American cities. White African-American Asian Hispanic (of any race) Other

Detroit's population began to expand rapidly based on resource extraction from around the Great Lakes region, especially lumber and mineral resources. It entered the period of largest and most rapid growth in the early 20th century and through World War II, with the development of the automotive industry and related heavy industry. Attracting hundreds of thousands of immigrants from southern, central, and eastern Europe and from the Near East, as well as black and white migrants from the Southern United States, the city became a boomtown.

Detroit's population increased more than a thousand-fold between 1820 and 1930. Most of the increase occurred during the early decades of the 20th century. This massive population increase was driven by the expansion of the auto industry during the early twentieth century. By 1920, Detroit had become the fourth-largest city in the country, and it held this position for decades. Postwar suburbanization and industrial restructuring caused massive job loss and population changes in the city.

View chart definition.
Historical census population of Detroit, Michigan

== History ==
=== Early years ===
Detroit was founded by Europeans in 1701 when the colonial French established a fort here as a center for trading. The European population numbered 100 French soldiers, farmers and merchants. The first women arrived in September. The fort attracted Native Americans of the region, and bands of various tribes settled nearby, including the Huron. They soon far outnumbered the French.

Detroit developed as the most important French city between Montreal and New Orleans, two major areas of colonial settlement. Its European population was 800 people in 1765, shortly after France ceded its territory east of the Mississippi River to Great Britain after being defeated in the Seven Years' War. By that time, most or all of the Native Americans had moved from the area.

By 1773, the population of Detroit was 1,400. By 1778, its population was 2,144 and it was the third largest city in the British Province of Quebec. At this time, the British considered it part of Quebec rather than the Thirteen Colonies.

After the American Revolutionary War and settlement of the northern boundary between Canada and the United States, Detroit and Michigan became part of US territory.

=== 20th century ===
In the early 20th century from 1910 to 1930, Detroit was among the many cities in the North that attracted immigrants from southern, central, and eastern Europe as well as African American migrants during the Great Migration. The promise of lucrative employment opportunities in the burgeoning auto industry in addition to readily available property brought many people to Detroit. They sought a place where they could settle down and live the American Dream. More than one-fifth of the population of the city was consistently composed of immigrants during the first half of the 20th century. From at least 1880 to the 1980s, the greatest number of immigrants and their descendants living in Wayne County, Michigan (where Detroit is located) were from central and eastern Europe.

Detroit's population increased from under 500,000 in 1910 to over 1.8 million at the city's peak in 1950, making Detroit the fourth-most populous city in the United States at that time. The population grew largely because of an influx of European immigrants, in addition to the migration of both black and white Americans to Detroit. During the Great Migration, beginning around 1920, black people left the South in search of better jobs as well as to escape Jim Crow laws. During the first wave of the Great Migration, thousands of African Americans settled in Detroit, as part of the total of 1.5 million black people who left the South in the first half of the 20th century looking for opportunities in the Northeast and Midwest. In 1910, about 6,000 black people lived in the city. By 1930, more than 120,000 black people lived in Detroit. Despite the large influx of black residents, in 1940, whites still made up 90.4% of the city's population, indicating a similarly large influx of white residents due to the burgeoning job market.

During the Great Migration, it was not only black Americans seeking better opportunities throughout the United States. In the 1930s and early 40s, many Native Americans, such as the Creek (Muscogee) and Cherokee from Oklahoma settled in Detroit. The federal government encouraged such urban relocation so that Native Americans would have access to jobs and other opportunities. The Hispanic population of Detroit also rapidly increased after 1940, especially in the late 20th century as immigration laws changed. By 2010, the Hispanic population of Detroit was ten times higher than that of 1940.

During the 1940s, the booming defense industries attracted large numbers of workers, who enjoyed the readily available jobs and often higher wages. The expansion of industry for war production during World War II resulted in Detroit's population growing by 350,000 people from 1940 to 1943. The defense industries attracted 50,000 black people from the South in the Second Great Migration, along with 300,000 whites mostly from the South. Many industries in Detroit were willing to hire black people for work, particularly during the war when there was a shortage of workers. By 1940, nearly 12% of automotive giant Ford's workers were black.

While there may have been many jobs available to new immigrants to the city, the rapidly growing population created a significant housing crisis in Detroit. Most black residents who moved to Detroit settled in the neighborhoods of Black Bottom or Paradise Valley, on the East side of Detroit. These choices in housing were largely dictated by restrictive covenants that prevented black people from purchasing homes in white neighborhoods. In addition to restrictive covenants, neighborhoods of Detroit experienced redlining, which prevented anyone who lived in a redlined district from getting a loan or mortgage for their house from the FHA (the HOLC would lend to residents of redlined districts). Real estate agents also often refused to show houses in white neighborhoods to black people, and white residents formed homeowners associations to prevent black residents moving in. In addition, the city council used the construction of highways in Detroit as a tool for slum removal. Much of Paradise Valley and Black Bottom was bulldozed to make room for I-375. This further constricted the already tight housing market for black migrants, exacerbating the housing crisis. Despite the lack of housing, black people continued to move to Detroit, and by 1960, almost 30% of the population of Detroit was black.

The white population of the city peaked in 1950 and then steadily declined due to white flight and net emigration through 2010. The white population fell 95% between the 1950 and 2010 censuses, as whites who often still worked in the city moved to the surrounding suburbs. Many of these white residents were moving out of the city to avoid black Detroiters who were now able to buy houses in white neighborhoods after landmark civil rights cases such as Shelley v. Kraemer began to lower barriers to home ownership. Additionally, the industrial boom of the postwar period had begun to decline by the 1950s and '60s. In 1950, 56% of all automobile-manufacturing employment in the United States was in Michigan, but by 1960, that had fallen to 40%. Many of the factories that had employed thousands of Detroiters were forced to lay off workers, leading to Detroiters moving elsewhere for work.

Major changes to US immigration law in 1965 resulted in a large influx of Middle Eastern residents. The Middle Eastern population in Detroit rose from 70,000 in 1974 to 92,000 in 2004.

The Detroit riot of 1967, a result of years of segregation in Detroit, only exacerbated the phenomenon of white flight. One of the major consequences of white flight was the commercial vacuum that it created. The city lost a great deal of tax revenue, and many neighborhoods lost valuable commercial centers and markets, contributing to a vicious cycle of disinvestment and population decline. By 1980, not only did black people make up over 60% of the population, but the population of Detroit as a whole had decreased by 35% since its height in 1950. This trend of population decline did not change in the following 30 years, and by 2010, the population of Detroit had decreased by about 60%. The black population of Detroit peaked at over 3/4 of a million between 1980 and 2000, and then black flight began, and between 2000 and 2020 over 1/3 of all black and white residents left Detroit for the surrounding suburbs. While Detroit had been in the top ten most populous cities in the United States between 1910 and 2000, given its population decline after 2000 Detroit ranked as the 18th-most populous city in the United States in 2010, and the 28th-most populous city in the United States in 2020.

In an apparent turn-around, the Detroit News reported in its September 17, 2015, edition that the white population of the city was rising, with a reported increase in white residents from 2013 to 2014 of nearly 8,000. This was the first measurable increase in Detroit's white population since 1950, when the city was 84% white. Indeed, the 2020 U.S. census showed that the non-Hispanic white population of Detroit increased by 5,000 people between 2010 and 2020. Though this was a small amount relative to Detroit's overall population, it was the first measurable population growth in decades.

Estimates by the Census Bureau reported that the population of Detroit increased 1,852 in 2023, the first growth in population since 1957.

== Table ==
Demographic history profile of Detroit, Michigan, Between 1820 and 2020
Year	Population	White	% White	Non-Hispanic White	% Non-Hispanic White	Black	% Black	Asian	% Asian	Other or Mixed	% O/M	Hispanic/ Latino	% Hispanic/ Latino	Foreign Born	% FB
1820	1,422	1,355	95.29	NA	NA	67	4.71	0	0	0	0	NA	NA	NA	NA
1830	2,222	2,096	94.33	NA	NA	126	5.68	0	0	0	0	NA	NA	NA	NA
1840	9,102	8,909	97.88	NA	NA	193	2.12	0	0	0	0	NA	NA	NA	NA
1850	21,019	20,432	97.21	NA	NA	587	2.79	0	0	0	0	NA	NA	9,927	47.23
1860	45,619	44,216	96.92	NA	NA	1,403	3.08	0	0	0	0	NA	NA	NA	NA
1870	79,577	77,338	97.19	NA	NA	2,235	2.81	0	0	4	0	NA	NA	35,381	44.46
1880	116,340	113,475	97.54	NA	NA	2,821	2.42	10	0	34	0.04	NA	NA	45,645	39.23
1890	205,876	202,422	98.32	NA	NA	3,431	1.67	12	0.01	11	0	NA	NA	81,709	39.69
1900	285,704	281,575	98.55	NA	NA	4,111	1.44	4	0	14	0.01	NA	NA	96,503	33.78
1910	465,766	459,926	98.75	NA	NA	5,741	1.23	58	0.01	41	0.01	NA	NA	157,534	33.82
1920	993,678	952,065	95.81	NA	NA	40,838	4.11	620	0.06	155	0.02	NA	NA	290,884	29.27
1930	1,568,662	1,446,656	92.22	NA	NA	120,066	7.65	1,590	0.10	350	0.03	NA	NA	405,882	25.87
1940	1,623,452	1,472,662	90.71	1,467,506	90.39	149,119	9.19	1,237	0.08	434	0.02	5,156	0.32	322,688	19.88
1950	1,849,568	1,545,847	83.58	NA	NA	300,506	16.25	1,734	0.09	1,481	0.08	NA	NA	278,260	15.04
1960	1,670,144	1,182,970	70.83	NA	NA	482,223	28.87	2,780	0.17	2,171	0.13	NA	NA	201,713	12.08
1970	1,511,482	838,877	55.50	815,823	53.98	660,428	43.69	4,478	0.30	7,699	0.51	27,038	1.79	119,347	7.90
1980	1,203,339	413,730	34.38	402,077	33.41	758,939	63.07	6,621	0.55	24,049	2.00	28,970	2.41	68,303	5.68
1990	1,027,974	222,316	21.63	212,278	20.65	777,916	75.67	8,461	0.82	19,281	1.88	28,473	2.77	34,490	3.36
2000	951,270	116,599	12.26	99,921	10.50	775,772	81.55	9,519	1.00	49,380	5.19	47,167	4.96	45,541	4.79
2010	713,777	75,758	10.61	55,604	7.79	590,226	82.69	7,559	1.06	40,234	5.64	48,679	6.82	36,000	5.1
2020	639,111	68,407	10.70	60,770	9.50	496,534	77.69	10,193	1.59	60,886	9.52	51,269	8.02		

Detroit demographics
Self-identified race (2020)	Detroit City	Wayne County, MI
Total population	639,111	1,793,561
Population, percent change, 2010 to 2020	−10.5%	−1.5%
Population density	4,606.87/sq mi (1,778.72/km^{2})	2,665/sq mi (1,029/km^{2})
White alone, percent	10.7% ▲	49.2% ▼
(White alone, not Hispanic or Latino, percent)	9.5% ▲	47.8% ▼
Black or African-American alone, percent	77.7% ▼	37.6% ▼
Hispanic or Latino (of any race)	7.7% ▲	6.6% ▲
American Indian and Alaska Native alone, percent	0.5% ▲	0.4% ▲
Pacific Islander or Native Hawaiian alone, percent	0.0%	0.0%
Asian alone, percent	1.6% ▲	3.6% ▲
Two or more races, percent	4.9% ▲	6.2% ▲
Some Other Race, percent	4.6%▲	3.0%▲

== Central city ==
"7.2 Sq Mi"; a 2013 report created by a coalition of Data Driven Detroit, Downtown Detroit Partnership, Midtown Detroit Inc., and the Detroit Economic Growth Corp.; outlined the demographics of the following communities: Downtown, Corktown, Eastern Market, the eastern riverfront, Lafayette Park, Midtown, New Center, and Woodbridge, a total of 7.2 square miles (19 km^{2}), according to the 2010 U.S. census data. This central area is not as wealthy as comparable central areas in Minneapolis, Pittsburgh, and other similar cities, yet its residents have more ethnic diversity and are wealthier than other areas of Detroit. Eric Lacy of MLive wrote "Consider that data either proof downtown Detroit is on an upswing, other neighborhoods are deteriorating fast or a mixture of both."

== See also ==
- Demographics of Metro Detroit
- Timeline of Detroit
