= Kevyn Orr =

American lawyer

Personal details
- Born: Kevyn Duane Orr; May 11, 1958 (age 68) Fort Lauderdale, Florida, U.S.
- Party: Democratic
- Spouse: Donna Neale (m. 2006)
- Children: Kevyn; Alexandra
- Parents: Allen Eugene Orr; Donna Neale
- Education: University of Michigan (BA, JD)

Kevyn Duane Orr (born May 11, 1958) is an American lawyer who served as the emergency financial manager of the city of Detroit from 2013 to 2014 during the city's Chapter 9 bankruptcy. Orr is now a partner at the law firm Jones Day in its bankruptcy practice.

== Prior career ==
Orr holds B.A. (1979) and J.D. (1983) degrees from the University of Michigan. He began his legal career as an associate with Sterns Weaver Miller Weissler Alhadeff & Sitterson in Miami, where he was promoted to shareholder in 1988. He joined the Federal Deposit Insurance Corporation in 1991, and soon transferred to the Resolution Trust Corporation, where he became assistant general counsel for complex litigation and bankruptcy. Starting in 1995 he was the deputy director of the Executive Office for United States Trustees, a division of the United States Department of Justice that monitors the nation's bankruptcy system, and in 2000 he became the director of the United States Trustees Program.

In 2001, Orr joined the Washington, D.C. office of the international law firm Jones Day as a partner. Orr had been picked to lead Jones Day's new Miami office before he resigned his partnership to move to Detroit. Noting his "impressive depth of experience," legal industry publication Chambers and Partners listed Orr among the top bankruptcy lawyers in Washington as of 2013.

While at Jones Day, Orr represented Chrysler in connection with its 2009 bankruptcy and restructuring. According to bankruptcy court records, Orr billed $700 an hour during the bankruptcy. The Detroit News described Orr as "the lead attorney on convincing the court to allow Chrysler to abruptly close a quarter of its U.S. dealerships". The Chrysler bankruptcy proceeding was widely regarded as successful for leading to greater sales and profits and Chrysler's renewed "reputation as a bold and innovative automaker".

== Tenure as emergency manager ==
A Democrat, he was appointed by Michigan Governor Rick Snyder as emergency manager to oversee Detroit financial operations on March 14, 2013 under Public Act 72. On January 24, 2013 Snyder had signed a revised version of a controversial emergency manager law that was rejected by voters during the November election. The new law, Public Act 436, took effect on March 28, 2013 and gave the Detroit emergency manager extraordinary control over all Detroit financial matters, and the ability to recommend to the governor and state treasurer that the government enter Chapter 9 bankruptcy.

Orr began his expected 18-month term as emergency manager on March 25, 2013.

At Orr's recommendation and with the approval of Governor Snyder, the city of Detroit filed for bankruptcy on July 18, 2013. His former law firm Jones Day was hired to handle Detroit's bankruptcy. The pick has been criticized as a conflict of interest (Jones Day represents several of Detroit's creditors like Bank of America) and the firms billing rates of up to $1,075 per hour and large travel expenses have been questioned. Yet some legal scholars have opined that no conflict existed between Orr and his former employer. Orr has said of his former employer, "if I didn’t have Jones Day, I might have had to hire six to eight additional firms."

On December 3, 2013, U.S. Bankruptcy Judge Steven Rhodes ruled that Detroit was legally entitled to pursue bankruptcy.

By the summer of 2014, thousands of Detroit residents per week were being denied access to running water in their homes. On July 28, 2014, Orr signed Emergency Manager Order No. 31, further clarifying the roles of the Detroit Water and Sewerage Department and the Board of Water Commissioners, in part: "the EM has determined that, at the present time, it is in the best interest of the City that the Mayor be granted the power and authority that the mayor would have had with respect to the Detroit Water and Sewerage Department ("DWSD") and the Board of Water Commissioners for DWSD ("BOWC") absent PA 436 in order to aid the EM in providing necessary governmental services essential to the public health, safety and welfare" of its residents.

On November 7, 2014, U.S. Bankruptcy Judge Steven Rhodes approved Orr's plan for the city of Detroit.

On December 10, 2014, Governor Snyder announced that Detroit had emerged from bankruptcy, and that he had accepted Orr's resignation as emergency manager, returning control of Detroit to its elected government.

== Personal ==
Orr was born in Fort Lauderdale, Florida. Orr's father, Allen Eugene Orr, was an "A.M.E. minister who marched to support the rights of south Florida's African-American minority in the 1960s and 1970s"; his mother, Dorothy Jackson, was a teacher who eventually became an administrator in the office of Broward County's superintendent of schools.

In 1990, the Miami Herald listed Orr as one of the area's "Most Eligible Men".

Since 2004, he has been married to Dr. Donna Neale, a surgeon at Johns Hopkins Hospital in Baltimore, Maryland; they began dating in 1994. They have a son named Kevyn and a daughter named Alexandra.
