= Eduardo Bueno =

Brazilian journalist

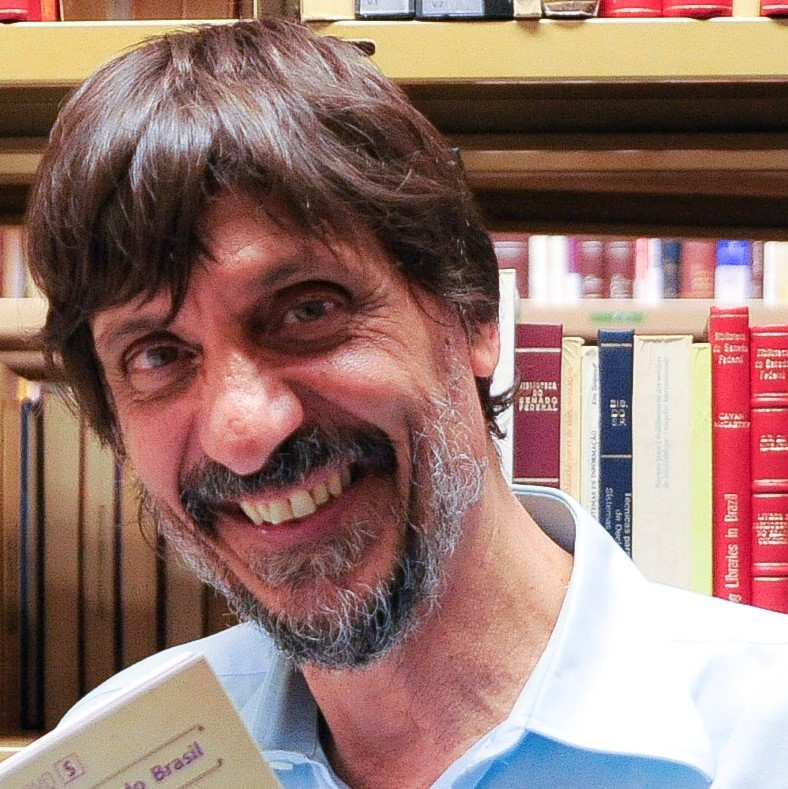
- Bueno in 2019
- Born: Eduardo Romulo Bueno; 30 May 1958 (age 68); Porto Alegre, Rio Grande do Sul, Brazil
- Education: Federal University of Rio Grande do Sul
- Occupations: Journalist, writer, translator, and Youtuber

Eduardo Romulo Bueno (born 30 May 1958), also known as Peninha, is a Brazilian journalist, writer, translator, and YouTuber. Initially working as a journalist at newspapers, he became known for his translation of books from English to Portuguese, and later for his books about various historical subjects. Beginning in the mid-2000s, he also began hosting educational shows and television programs about Brazilian history. He is currently the host of his own YouTube channel, Buenas Ideias, in which he creates educational material about the history of Brazil in a relaxed setting. His channel, as of September 2024, has over 1.4 million subscribers.

== Biography ==
Bueno was born on 30 May 1958 in Porto Alegre. He began his professional career at 17 years old as a reporter for the Rio Grande do Sul–based newspaper Zero Hora, where he gained the nickname "Peninha", based on Fethry Duck of the Walt Disney universe. He later worked at A Patada. He became an editor, screenwriter, and translator in various forms of media. He would later graduate with a degree in journalism from the Federal University of Rio Grande do Sul (UFRGS).

He became known when he was young for his participation in the show "Pra Começo de Conversa", by TV Educativa de Porto Alegre. In 1988, he also had a block in another program by that educational TV station, during lunch time, alongside Maria do Carmo Bueno, José Pedro Goulart, Cândido Norberto dos Santos, and others. He also became part of the team of journalist Augusto Nunes at Zero Hora.

In 2003, Bueno was awarded the Ordem do Mérito Cultural.

=== Literature ===
Bueno became known nationally for translating Jack Kerouac's "On the Road", one of the beatnik era's most well-known pieces, which he translated into Portuguese as "Pé na Estrada".

Taking advantage of the preparation for the national celebrations of the 500th anniversary of when Europeans first encountered what is now Brazil, he signed a contract with Editora Objetiva for the release of four books about the history of Brazil aimed at average people, called the Coleção Brasilis. These books included:

1. A Viagem do Descobrimento (1998);
2. Náufragos, Traficantes e Degredados (1998);
3. Capitães do Brasil (1999);
4. A Coroa, a Cruz e a Espada (2006).

The sales of the first three books alone reached 500,000 as of 2006. During this period, Bueno released twelve other works on historical themes including, but not limited to, the Caixa Econômica Federal ("Caixa: Uma História Brasileira"), the Brazilian Health Regulatory Agency ("À Sua Saúde — A Vigilância Sanitária na História do Brasil"), Porto Alegre-based Grêmio FBPA ("Grêmio: Nada Pode Ser Maior"), the Avenida Rio Branco in Rio de Janeiro ("Avenida Rio Branco"), public health in Brazil ("Passado a Limpo"), the Confederação Nacional da Indústria ("Produto Nacional"), and the band Mamonas Assassinas ("Mamonas Assassinas - Blá, Blá, Blá: a Biografia Autorizada"). He had also participated in a project about a biography of Bob Dylan, a musician for whom he has great admiration. In 2023, as part of the 80th anniversary of the creation of Disney character Zé Carioca, he collaborated on a graphic novel featuring the character, titled Zé Carioca conta a história do Brasil, which was published by Culturama.

Bueno has considered other projects as well, and has affirmed his interest in writing about subjects such as the Pre-Cabraline history of Brazil, the bandeirantes, and about the Dutch occupation of what is now Brazil.

=== TV and Radio ===
From September to November 2007, Bueno hosted the series "É muita história" on the show Fantástico, broadcast on Rede Globo. In each episode, for about 10 minutes, he would appear dressed as one of the real people that were involved in the episode's subject matter and go onto the streets to converse with people in public. In the series' debut episode, Um Dia de Fúria, he tackles the famous saying of “Independência ou morte”, which was shouted on the banks of the Ipiranga by Dom Pedro I. Bueno dressed up as Dom Pedro talked with passersby that walked the same path as was made by Dom Pedro on 7 September 1822.

In 2010, he was interviewed by Steve Kroft of 60 Minutes as part of a segment on Brazil as a growing economic power on the world stage, as well as on president Luiz Inácio Lula da Silva.

== Journalist versus historian ==
Though his works have been used as part of the teaching material of Brazilian classes and Bueno has been at points been viewed as a historian, his education and professional background is in journalism. As a result, his works have been criticized by some historians, who have evaluated his works as superficial and bounded to just quirks of history, thereby hurting the profession and publication of more rigorous material based on historiographic studies. When asked about this by Laurentino Gomes, Bueno responded that the discussion increasingly became unnecessary and foolish, and that many historians could immediately differentiate between a historiographical investigation and what he does. He names various historians with whom he believes he had obtained the understanding and respect of, including Nicolau Sevcenko, Max Justo Guedes, Joaquim Romero Magalhães, Lilia Moritz Schwarcz, Eric Hobsbawm, Kenneth Maxwell, and Bueno's friend Mary del Priore.

=== 2025 social media remarks about Charlie Kirk ===
In September 2025, after the assassination of American political activist Charlie Kirk, Eduardo Bueno posted a video on his Instagram account making remarks about the incident. In the video, Bueno said that Kirk's daughters “would grow up better without” him and described Kirk as “a repugnant, scoundrel, racist, homophobic man linked to pedophile Donald Trump.” The comments generated widespread criticism, leading to the cancellation of a scheduled event in Porto Alegre and his removal from the Editorial Council of Brazil's Federal Senate (CEDIT). Bueno later posted a second video expressing regret to those close to him who felt offended, while maintaining that he had not said anything wrong about Kirk.

== Bibliography ==
Year	Title	Publisher	Ref.
1996	Mamonas Assassinas: Blá, Blá, Blá - A Biografia Autorizada	L&PM Editores	
1998	A Viagem do Descobrimento — Coleção Terra Brasilis	Objetiva	
1998	Náufragos, Traficantes e Degredados — Coleção Terra Brasilis	Objetiva	
1999	Capitães do Brasil — Coleção Terra Brasilis	Objetiva	
2000	Brasil — Terra à Vista!: A Aventura Ilustrada do Descobrimento	L&PM Editores	
2002	Pau Brasil	Axis Mundi	
2002	Caixa: Uma História Brasileira	Buenas Ideias	
2003	Brasil, Uma História — A Incrível Saga de um País	Ática	
2005	Grêmio: Nada Pode Ser Maior	Ediouro	
2005	À Sua Saúde — A Vigilância Sanitária na História do Brasil	Anvisa	
2005	Avenida Rio Branco, Um Século em Movimento	Buenas Ideias	
2006	A Coroa, a Cruz e a Espada — Coleção Brasilis	GMT Editores	
2007	Passado a Limpo — História da Higiene Pessoal no Brasil	Gabarito	
2008	Produto Nacional: uma história da indústria no Brasil	CNI	
2013	Brasil, Uma História — Cinco Séculos de Um País em Construção	Leya	
2019	Textos contraculturais, crônicas anacrônicas & outras viagens	L&PM Editores	
2020	Dicionário da Independência — 200 anos em 200 verbetes	Piu	
