= Priore =

Priore is a surname, and may refer to:

- Antoine Prioré (1912–1983), scientist
- Chuck Priore, American football coach
- Domenic Priore (born 1960), American author and television producer
- Fabian Del Priore (born 1978), German composer
- Mary del Priore (born 1952), American historian
- Michael Del Priore (1954-2020), American painter
- Nicolás Del Priore (1996), Argentine footballer
- Ray Priore (born 1963), American football coach
