= Kenneth E. Bailey Sr. =

American politician

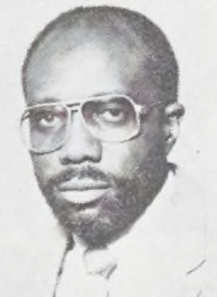
- Bailey in 1985

Member of the South Carolina House of Representatives from the 94th district
- In office February 26, 1985 – August 27, 1991
- Preceded by: John W. Matthews Jr.
- Succeeded by: Heyward Groverman Hutson

Personal details
- Born: Kenneth Elvin Bailey; November 12, 1946 Eutawville, South Carolina, U.S.
- Died: February 10, 2018 (aged 71) Holly Hill, South Carolina, U.S.
- Party: Democratic
- Spouse: Ida Lemon (m. 1971)
- Children: 2
- Education: Morris College; South Carolina State College (M.Ed.)

Kenneth Elvin Bailey Sr. (November 12, 1946 – February 10, 2018) was an American politician. A member of the Democratic Party, he served in the South Carolina House of Representatives from 1985 to 1991.

== Early life and military service ==
Bailey was born in Eutawville, South Carolina, the son of Peter Bailey and Annie Ruth. He was the fourth of nine children. He attended Morris College and South Carolina State College, earning his M.Ed. degree. He completed the requirements for a Doctor of Divinity while attending Carolina Theological Bible Institute, Southeastern Baptist Theological Seminary, and Shaw University Divinity School.

Baily served in the United States Army from 1968 to 1970. He served in the armed forces during the Korean War, and was honorably discharged with the rank of Sergeant.

== Career ==
After his military service, Bailey taught at Williams Memorial High School in St. George, South Carolina. During this time he joined the Eutawville Branch of the NAACP, gaining an introduction to political organizing. In 1975, he was elected the Vice Chairman of the Holly Hill School District Board, and in 1980, he was elected the South Eutawville Precinct President. He became the State Democratic Party Executive Committeeman in 1984.

Bailey served in the South Carolina House of Representatives from 1985 to 1991. He lost his seat in the House, in 1991, as a result of Operation Lost Trust, after pleading guilty to accepting a $500 cash bribe and conspiracy. At the time, future Minority Leader of the Senate, Brad Hutto, would serve as his lead defense attorney.

== Death ==
Bailey died on February 10, 2018 in Holly Hill, South Carolina, at the age of 71. He is buried in Eutawville, South Carolina.

South Carolina House of Representatives
Preceded by John W. Matthews Jr.	Member of the South Carolina House of Representatives from the 94th district 1985–1991	Succeeded by Heyward Groverman Hutson
