= Charles Wycliffe Joiner =

American judge

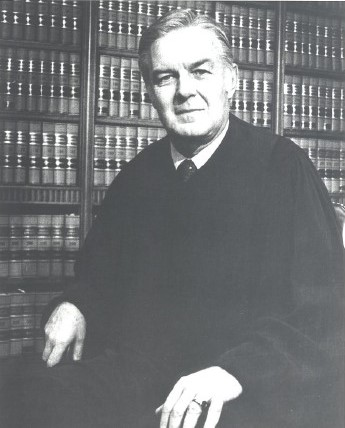

Senior Judge of the United States District Court for the Eastern District of Michigan
- In office August 15, 1984 – March 10, 2017

Judge of the United States District Court for the Eastern District of Michigan
- In office June 9, 1972 – August 15, 1984
- Appointed by: Richard Nixon
- Preceded by: Talbot Smith
- Succeeded by: Barbara Kloka Hackett

10th Dean of University of Michigan Law School
- In office 1965–1966
- Preceded by: Allan F. Smith
- Succeeded by: Francis A. Allen

Personal details
- Born: Charles Wycliffe Joiner; February 14, 1916 Maquoketa, Iowa, U.S.
- Died: March 10, 2017 (aged 101) Naples, Florida, U.S.
- Education: University of Iowa (B.A.); University of Iowa College of Law (J.D.)

Charles Wycliffe Joiner (February 14, 1916 – March 10, 2017) was a United States district judge of the United States District Court for the Eastern District of Michigan.

== Education and career ==
Born on February 14, 1916, in Maquoketa, Iowa, Joiner received a Bachelor of Arts degree from the University of Iowa in 1937 and a Juris Doctor from the University of Iowa College of Law in 1939. He was in private practice in Des Moines, Iowa from 1939 to 1947. He was in the United States Army Air Forces as a Lieutenant during World War II, from 1943 to 1945. He was a member of the faculty of University of Michigan Law School from 1947 to 1965. He was an associate dean for the University of Michigan Law School from 1960 to 1968. He was acting dean of the University of Michigan Law School from 1965 to 1966. He was an Alderman for the City of Ann Arbor, Michigan, from 1955 to 1959. He was director of research and drafting for the Constitutional Convention of the State of Michigan from 1961 to 1962. He was a dean and professor of law at Wayne State University in Detroit, Michigan from 1967 to 1972. He was a lecturer in law for the University of Michigan Law School from 1974 to 1984.

== Federal judicial service ==
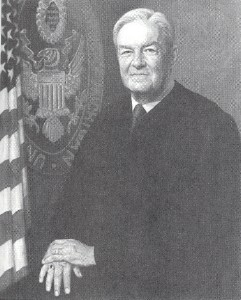
Judicial portrait of Joiner, 1996, by Michael Del Priore.

On April 25, 1972, Joiner was nominated by President Richard Nixon to a seat on the United States District Court for the Eastern District of Michigan vacated by Judge Talbot Smith. He was confirmed by the United States Senate on June 8, 1972, and received his commission on June 9, 1972. He assumed senior status on August 15, 1984. He turned 100 in February 2016 and died on March 10, 2017, in Naples, Florida, at the age of 101.

== Viola Liuzzo ==
Joiner presided over a lawsuit brought against the FBI by the family of murdered civil rights activist Viola Liuzzo. In 1965, three Ku Klux Klan members had been convicted for their parts in the fatal attack on Liuzzo. A fourth man, Gary Thomas Rowe, had accompanied them, but was not charged until 1978, when the cover up of his role as an FBI informant and the FBI smear campaign against Liuzzo were revealed. In 1983, Joiner rejected the Liuzzo family's claims, saying there was "no evidence the FBI was in any type of joint venture with Rowe or conspiracy against Mrs. Liuzzo. Rowe's presence in the car was the principal reason why the crime was solved so quickly."

== See also ==
- List of United States federal judges by longevity of service

== Sources ==
Legal offices
Preceded by Talbot Smith	Judge of the United States District Court for the Eastern District of Michigan; 1972–1984	Succeeded by Barbara Kloka Hackett
