= Senator Long =

Senator Long may refer to:

== United States ==
=== Members of the United States Senate ===
- Chester I. Long (1860–1934), U.S. Senator from Kansas from 1903 to 1909
- Edward V. Long (1908–1972), U.S. Senator from Missouri from 1960 to 1968
- Huey Long (1893–1935), U.S. Senator from Louisiana from 1932 to 1935
- Oren E. Long (1889–1965), U.S. Senator from Hawaii from 1959 to 1963
- Rose McConnell Long (1892–1970), U.S. Senator from Louisiana from 1936 to 1937
- Russell B. Long (1918–2003), U.S. Senator from Louisiana from 1948 to 1987

=== Members of U.S. state senates ===
- David C. Long (born 1955), Indiana State Senate
- Ed Long (politician) (1934–2017), Oklahoma State Senate
- Edward Henry Carroll Long (1808–1865), Maryland State Senate
- Gerald Long (born 1944), Louisiana State Senate
- J. H. Long (1845–1898), Washington State Senate
- Jefferson M. Long Jr. (1927–2003), South Carolina State Senate
- John David Long (1901–1967), South Carolina State Senate
- Macon M. Long (1885–1988), Virginia State Senate
- Marshall Long (1936–2018), Kentucky State Senate
- Patrick Long (New Hampshire state senator) (born 1955), New Hampshire State Senate
- Speedy Long (1928–2006), Louisiana State Senate

== Others ==
- James Long (Australian politician) (1870–1932), Australian politician, Senator for Tasmania from 1910 to 1918
- John Andrew Long (1869–1941), Northern Irish Senator from 1921 to 1941
