= Vernon Stephens =

Vernon Stephens may refer to:

- Vern Stephens (1920–1968), American baseball player
- Vernon Stephens (politician), American politician
