= Operation Lost Trust =

FBI investigation into the South Carolina General Assembly

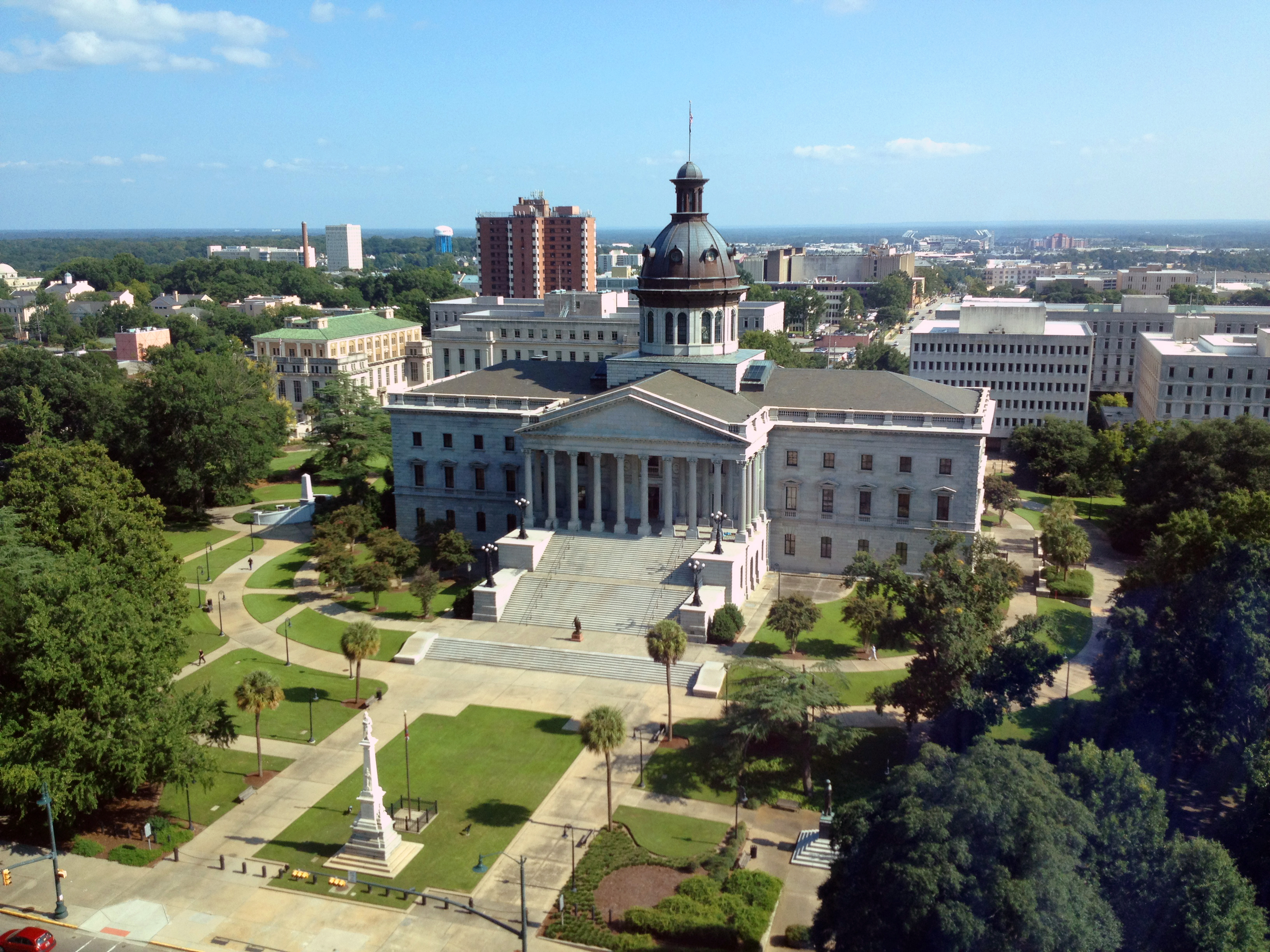
The South Carolina State House.

Operation Lost Trust was the name of an FBI investigation into the South Carolina General Assembly from 1989 to 1999. By the end of the investigation, seventeen members of the South Carolina General Assembly were arrested for bribery, extortion, or drug use. Operation Lost Trust is often considered the greatest political scandal in the history of the state of South Carolina. It directly influenced the passing of South Carolina's Ethics Reform Act of 1991, and led to the restructuring of the state government in 1993. In its wake, the once-dominant South Carolina Democratic Party was weakened as a political party, and the Republican Party emerged as a viable political entity in the state.

== Investigation ==
In 1989, the Federal Bureau of Investigation began investigating the South Carolina General Assembly after the narcotics arrest of Ron L. Cobb, a lobbyist and former Democratic member of the South Carolina House of Representatives. The FBI supplied Cobb with a boat located in Hilton Head Island, South Carolina and an office in Atlanta for the purposes of misleading state lawmakers into believing that he represented the Alpha Group, a fake organization seeking support for a bill legalizing dog and horse-track betting. Cobb was instructed to bribe lawmakers with campaign contributions in return for their support for the bill.

In July 1990, a grand jury subpoenaed the campaign finance records of all 170 members of the General Assembly, consequently revealing the existence of the investigation. The investigators were looking for self-reported disclosures of the in-total $30,000 that investigators doled out to tempt lawmakers during the election season. Five legislators, including State Representative Robert A. Kohn (R), were initially indicted for failure to disclose the payments and violating the Hobbs Act. Kohn later agreed to cooperate with prosecutors. While the four indicted members of the General Assembly in the House of Representatives were suspended from official duties, the lone senator, William Richard Lee (R), was able to continue his work in the South Carolina Senate.

Those convicted included:

1. Jack Rogers (D) — State Representative and Speaker Pro Temp from the 54th District; was accused of extorting money from lobbyists. He pled guilty to a charge of racketeering, and was sentenced to 45 months in prison. (1991)
2. Kenneth E. Bailey Sr. (D) — State Representative of Eutawville; accepted a $500 cash bribe, and was convicted of conspiracy.
3. Larry Blanding (D) — State Representative from Sumter. After several trials and reversals, Blanding was found guilty of conspiracy and extortion, and sentenced to 37 months.
4. Robert B. Brown (D) — State Representative from Charleston; pled guilty to bribery.
5. Paul Wayne Derrick (R) — State Representative of Lexington; was found guilty of conspiracy and extortion for accepting $1,000 in bribes. He was sentenced to 34 months.
6. Ennis M. Fant (D) — State Representative from Greenville; pled guilty to conspiracy and extortion, received 20 months.
7. James Faber (D) — State Representative from Richland County; pled guilty to accepting a 41,000 bribe.
8. James C. Tee Ferguson (D) — State Representative and Circuit Judge of Spartanburg; guilty of extortion and drug charges, and sentenced to 33 months.
9. Benjamin J. Gordon Jr. (D) — State Representative of Kingstree; found guilty of conspiracy and extortion, but died during appeal.
10. Robert Albert Kohn (R) — State Senator from Charleston; pled guilty to conspiracy and bribery, and served seven months in prison.
11. Rick Lee (R) — State Senator from Boiling Springs; pled guilty to accepting a $2,000 bribe. He was sentenced to six months at a halfway house.
12. Thomas A. Limehouse (D) — State Representative from Dorchester; pled guilty to charges of conspiring to accept a bribe and tampering with a witness. Sentenced to 20 months.
13. John Charles “Jack” Lindsay (D) — State Senator from Marlboro; found guilty in the Lost Trust investigation, but died during appeals.
14. Jefferson M. Long Jr. (D) — State Senator from Horry; guilty to $42,000 bribe.
15. Frank McBride (D) — State Representative from Columbia; pled guilty to accepting $1,000 in bribes.
16. Luther L Taylor, Jr. (D) — State Representative from Columbia; pled guilty to conspiracy and bribery, and was sentenced to 80 months in prison, but died during appeals.
17. Daniel E. Winstead (R) — State Representative from Charleston; pled guilty to accepting bribes and obstruction of justice.

At that time, South Carolina required that state lawmakers report any campaign contributions they received to the respective ethics committee of their governing body. After the initial five indictments made the news, Governor Carroll A. Campbell Jr. (R) and Speaker of the House Robert Sheheen (D) both stated that reforms to this system were in order. Out of the 28 indictments in total (including indicted lobbyists), only the indictment of Representative Timothy Castles Wilkes (D) resulted in a not guilty verdict. The South Carolina Legislative Black Caucus raised concerns about the large number of African American lawmakers charged during the investigation.

== Aftermath ==
=== Ethics Reform Act of 1991 ===
In response to Operation Lost Trust, state lawmakers passed the Ethics Reform Act of 1991. This act made it illegal for lobbyists to give any gift, including campaign contributions, to any serving member of the government. It also capped donations from lobbying firms (lobbyists themselves had to be uninvolved in the decision) to $1,000 when it was previously unlimited. The act also regulated how businesses and organizations which employ lobbyists could entertain lawmakers, ensuring that the entertainment was conducted only in formal groups.

=== Strengthening the governorship ===
On February 23, 1993, a bill was introduced to the South Carolina House of Representatives to restructure the state government. Up to this point, the governor of South Carolina had largely been a ceremonial figurehead with limited power. However, after Operation Lost Trust, the General Assembly voted to give the governor what was essentially a "third" of its power. According to The State, the main newspaper of Columbia, South Carolina, “the legislation condensed 75 agencies into 17, and let the governor hire and fire the directors of 11.” The legislature maintained its power over education, road construction, and environmental regulations, while giving the governor power over agencies that imprisoned people, managed healthcare, and collected taxes for the state. South Carolina is still considered a “legislative state,” with the General Assembly maintaining a large proportion of power over the governor’s appointments, as well as the ability to appoint judges.

== See also ==
- South Carolina Statehouse corruption investigation
