= Ken Kennedy =

Ken Kennedy may refer to:

- Kenneth Kennedy (speed skater) (1913–1985), Australian Olympic speed skater
- Kenneth A. R. Kennedy (1930–2014), American anthropologist
- Kenneth Kennedy (bishop) (died 1943), Anglican bishop in India, 1926–1936
- Ken Anderson (wrestler) (born 1976), professional wrestler who used ring name Ken Kennedy, better known as Mr. Kennedy
- Ken Kennedy (computer scientist) (1945–2007), computer scientist from Rice University, father of High Performance Fortran
- Ken Kennedy (rugby union) (1941–2022), Ireland international rugby union footballer
- Kenneth Kennedy (politician) (1942–2015), known as Ken, American businessman and member of the South Carolina House of Representatives
- Kenneth Kennedy (sprinter) (born 1903), American sprinter, winner of the 440 yards at the 1926 USA Outdoor Track and Field Championships
