= Numertia Plantation =

Historic house in South Carolina, United States

- U.S. National Register of Historic Places
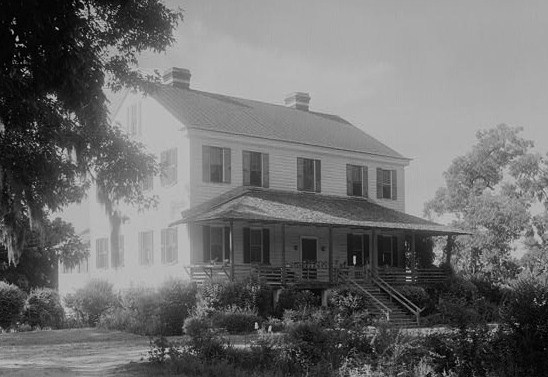
- Numertia Plantation House, HABS Photo

- Location within South Carolina Location within the United States
- Location: Off of Highway 138 (about 1.5 miles SW of Highway 6 intersection), Eutawville, SC
- Coordinates: 33°23′04″N 80°16′44″W
- Built: 1851
- Architectural style: Greek Revival
- NRHP reference No.: 82003898
- Added to NRHP: March 19, 1982

Numertia Plantation is an historic plantation house located near Eutawville, Orangeburg County, South Carolina. It was built about 1850–1851, probably for Major Samuel Porcher. It is a two-story frame structure on a brick foundation. The house follows the pattern of central hall farmhouses, two rooms deep and two rooms wide.

It was added to the National Register of Historic Places in 1982.
