= Douglas Jennings Jr. =

American politician

Member of the South Carolina House of Representatives from the 54th district
- In office 1991–2014
- Preceded by: Jack Rogers (politician)
- Succeeded by: Elizabeth Munnerlyn

Personal details
- Spouse: Suzanne
- Children: 2
- Education: Clemson University; University of South Carolina
- Profession: Attorney

Douglas Jennings Jr., is an American attorney and politician from South Carolina. Jennings was previously an assistant solicitor for the fourth circuit.

== Early life and education ==
Jennings graduated from Clemson University with a BA in 1978 and with a JD from the University of South Carolina in 1982. He served as a Legislative Assistant in the United States House of Representatives from 1978 to 1979, and as a Research Assistant for the South Carolina Senate Judiciary Committee from 1979 to 1982.

== Political career ==
Jennings was a member of the South Carolina House of Representatives from 1991 to 2014. He served as House Minority Leader and on the Sentencing Reform Commission. He was a founding member of the North Eastern Strategic Alliance (NESA), and chaired its I-73 Committee. Jennings also served as Chairman of the Marlboro County Election Commission from 1986 to 1991.

== Awards ==
Jennings received the Governor's Rural Economic Leadership Award in 1999 and an Honorary Doctorate from Francis Marion University in 2002. When Jennings retired from the South Carolina Legislature in 2010, he received the Order of the Palmetto from Governor Mark Sanford, and a Concurrent Resolution by the House and Senate in recognition of his contributions. A portion of highway in Blenheim, South Carolina was named in his honor.
