= Laurie J. Michelson =

American judge (born 1967)

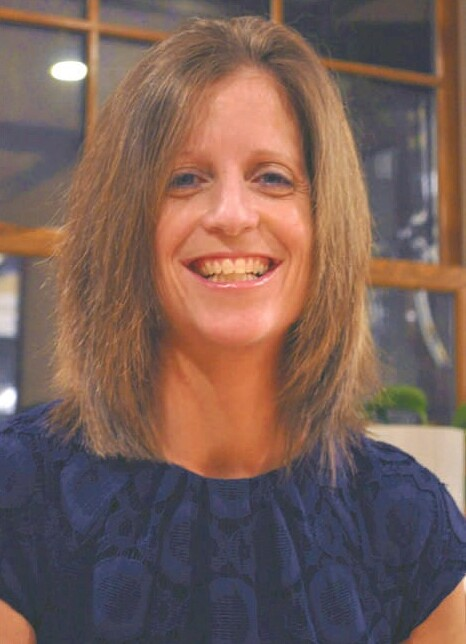

Judge of the United States District Court for the Eastern District of Michigan
- Incumbent
- Assumed office March 14, 2014
- Appointed by: Barack Obama
- Preceded by: George Caram Steeh III

Magistrate Judge of the United States District Court for the Eastern District of Michigan
- In office 2011 – March 14, 2014

Personal details
- Born: 1967 (age 58–59) Detroit, Michigan, U.S.
- Education: University of Michigan (AB); Northwestern University (JD)

Laurie Jill Michelson (born 1967) is a United States district judge of the United States District Court for the Eastern District of Michigan and former United States magistrate judge of the same court.

== Biography ==
Michelson received an Artium Baccalaureus degree in 1989 from the University of Michigan. She received a Juris Doctor in 1992 from Northwestern University School of Law. From 1992 to 1993, she served as a law clerk to Judge Cornelia Groefsema Kennedy of the United States Court of Appeals for the Sixth Circuit. She joined the law firm of Butzel Long as an associate in 1993, becoming a shareholder in 2000. Her private practice specialized in media law, intellectual property and white collar criminal defense.

=== Federal judicial service ===
In 2011, she was appointed as a United States magistrate judge of the United States District Court for the Eastern District of Michigan, a capacity in which she served until her elevation as a district court judge on March 14, 2014.

On July 25, 2013, President Barack Obama nominated Michelson to serve as a United States district judge of the United States District Court for the Eastern District of Michigan, to the seat vacated by Judge George Caram Steeh III, who assumed senior status on January 29, 2013. On January 16, 2014, her nomination was reported out of committee by a voice vote. On March 11, 2014, the United States Senate invoked cloture on her nomination by a 56–43 vote. On March 12, 2014, her nomination was confirmed by a 98–0 vote. She received her judicial commission on March 14, 2014.

Legal offices
Preceded by George Caram Steeh III	Judge of the United States District Court for the Eastern District of Michigan; 2014–present	Incumbent
