= Daniel E. Winstead =

American politician (1945–2024)

Member of the South Carolina House of Representatives
- In office 1979–1990

Personal details
- Born: Daniel Edward Winstead; November 1, 1945 Ridgeland, South Carolina, U.S.
- Died: April 28, 2024 (aged 78)
- Party: Republican
- Spouse: Iris Mole Winstead (m. 1967)
- Education: Carson–Newman College

Daniel Edward Winstead (November 1, 1945 – April 28, 2024), also known as Danny Winstead, was an American politician. He served as a Republican member of the South Carolina House of Representatives.

== Life and career ==
Winstead was born in Ridgeland, South Carolina. He attended Wade Hampton High School and Carson–Newman College.

Winstead served in the South Carolina House of Representatives from 1979 to 1990. He lost his seat as a result of Operation Lost Trust, after pleading guilty to accepting bribes and obstruction of justice.

Winstead died on April 28, 2024, at the age of 78.
