= St. Julien Plantation =

Historic house in South Carolina, United States

- U.S. National Register of Historic Places
- Location within South Carolina Location within the United States
- Location: South Carolina Highway 6, near Eutawville, South Carolina
- Coordinates: 33°24′35″N 80°21′11″W
- Area: 42 acres (17 ha)
- Built: c. 1854
- Architectural style: Italianate, Carpenter Gothic
- NRHP reference No.: 80003693
- Added to NRHP: November 28, 1980

St. Julien Plantation is a historic plantation complex located near Eutawville, Orangeburg County, South Carolina. The plantation house was built about 1854, and is a two-story, L-shaped, vernacular farmhouse with Italianate influences. It features a low-pitched hipped roof with projecting eaves and a bracketed cornice. Also on the property are the contributing log cotton warehouse, board and batten kitchen, Carpenter Gothic mule barn, smokehouse, garage, storage building, and several wood frame farm buildings.

It was added to the National Register of Historic Places in 1980.
