= Ronnie A. Sabb =

American politician and attorney

Ronnie Sabb

Member of the South Carolina Senate from the 32nd district
- Incumbent
- Assumed office 2014
- Preceded by: J. Yancey McGill

Member of the South Carolina House of Representatives from the 101st district
- In office 2010–2014
- Preceded by: Kenneth "Ken" Kennedy
- Succeeded by: Cezar McKnight

Personal details
- Born: September 2, 1958 (age 68) Greeleyville, South Carolina, U.S.
- Party: Democratic
- Children: 1
- Education: Voorhees College (BS); University of Florida
- Profession: Attorney, politician

Ronnie A. Sabb (born September 2, 1958) is a Democratic member of the South Carolina Senate, representing the 32nd District since 2014. He is an attorney.

== Political career ==
=== S.C. Senate ===
==== Elections ====
===== 2016 election =====
In 2016, Sabb was reelected uncontested.

===== 2020 election =====
In 2020, Sabb faced several Democratic primary challengers, but still secured the nomination by receiving more than 70% of the vote.

===== 2024 election =====
In 2024, Sabb will face a single challenger in the Democratic primary, Prinscillia Sumpter.

South Carolina House of Representatives
Preceded by Kenneth "Ken" Kennedy	Member of the South Carolina House of Representatives from the 101st district 2010-2014	Succeeded by Cezar McKnight
South Carolina Senate
Preceded by J. Yancey McGill	Member of the South Carolina Senate from the 32nd district 2014–present	Incumbent
