= George Caram Steeh III =

American judge (born 1947)

Senior Judge of the United States District Court for the Eastern District of Michigan
- Incumbent
- Assumed office January 29, 2013

Judge of the United States District Court for the Eastern District of Michigan
- In office May 22, 1998 – January 29, 2013
- Appointed by: Bill Clinton
- Preceded by: Barbara Kloka Hackett
- Succeeded by: Laurie J. Michelson

Personal details
- Born: January 29, 1947 (age 79) Ann Arbor, Michigan, U.S.
- Education: University of Michigan (BA, JD)

George Caram Steeh III (born January 29, 1947) is a senior United States district judge of the United States District Court for the Eastern District of Michigan.

== Education and career ==
Steeh was born in Ann Arbor, Michigan. He received a Bachelor of Arts degree from the University of Michigan in 1969 and a Juris Doctor from the University of Michigan Law School in 1973. He worked in the Genesee County Prosecutor's Office from 1973 to 1980, as an assistant prosecuting attorney from 1973 to 1978, and as a first assistant prosecuting attorney from 1978 to 1980. He was in private practice in Michigan from 1980 to 1988, also serving as a public administrator of Macomb County from 1986 to 1989. He was a judge on the 41-B District Court of Michigan from 1989 to 1990, and on the 16th Circuit Court of Michigan from 1990 to 1998.

=== Federal judicial service ===
On September 24, 1997, Steeh was nominated by President Bill Clinton to a seat on the United States District Court for the Eastern District of Michigan vacated by Judge Barbara Kloka Hackett. He was confirmed by the United States Senate on May 13, 1998, and received his commission on May 22, 1998. He assumed senior status on January 29, 2013.

== Notable case ==
In October 2010, he was the first of several federal court judges to hear a case concerning the constitutionality of the Affordable Care Act. The main question here is whether the Commerce Clause of the Constitution of the United States gives the United States Congress the authority to buy any commercial product, which in this case is health insurance. Steeh ruled that the Act is constitutional, writing: "These decisions, viewed in the aggregate have clear and direct impacts on health care providers, taxpayers and the insured population who ultimately pay for the care provided to those who go without insurance," and that choosing not to obtain health insurance qualifies as an example of "activities that substantially affect interstate commerce." According to the Supreme Court of the United States, if a federal law arbitrates activities that substantially affect interstate commerce, then that law complies with the Commerce Clause.

Steeh tossed a civil rights lawsuit filed by a couple who claimed Detroit police officers operating as a “dog death squad” shot and killed their three dogs during a marijuana raid. He dismissed the suit filed by Kevin Thomas and Nikita Smith against Detroit police officers, saying they couldn’t recover because their dogs did not have a city license. Steeh reasoned that, because the dogs were unlicensed, Thomas and Smith had no legitimate possessory interest in the dogs, and there could be no violation of the Fourth Amendment. “When a person owns a dog that is unlicensed, in the eyes of the law it is no different than owning any other type of illegal property or contraband,” Steeh wrote. As precedent, Steeh cited a decision by the Chicago-based 7th U.S. Circuit Court of Appeals that held a plaintiff didn’t have a legitimate possessory interest in an unregistered submachine gun seized by police without a warrant.

== Sources ==
Legal offices
Preceded by Barbara Kloka Hackett	Judge of the United States District Court for the Eastern District of Michigan; 1998–2013	Succeeded by Laurie J. Michelson
