= Benjamin J. Gordon Jr =

American politician

Benjamin J. Gordon Jr.

Member of the South Carolina House of Representatives from the 101st district
- In office 1973–1989
- Succeeded by: Kenneth "Ken" Kennedy

Personal details
- Born: November 20, 1932 Waycross, Georgia, US
- Died: July 12, 1997 (aged 64) Florence, South Carolina, US
- Education: Claflin University

Benjamin James "BJ" Gordon Jr (November 20, 1932 – July 12, 1997) was a minister, businessman and American politician.

== Political career ==
Gordon served as a Democratic member for the 101st district in the South Carolina House of Representatives from 1973 to 1989.

During his time as a legislator Gordon served on the Water Resources Commission, as a member of the Governor's Advisory Medicare Committee, on the Rules Committee, the House Ways and Means Committee and the Committee on Hunger.

Gordon lost his seat as a result of Operation Lost Trust An order by United States Federal District Court Judge Falcon B. Hawkins dismissed the charges.

== Death ==
Gordon died on July 12, 1997.
