= Thomas A. Limehouse =

American politician

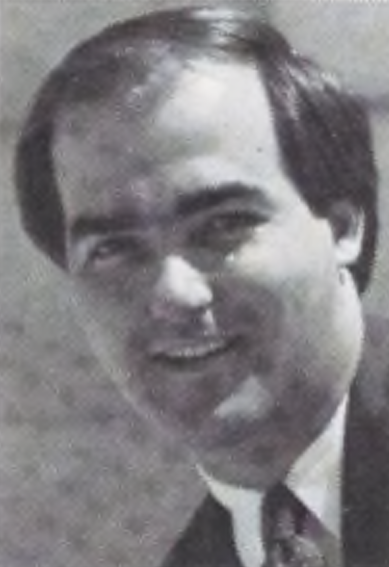
- Limehouse in 1985

Member of the South Carolina House of Representatives from the 98th district
- In office 1985–1990
- Preceded by: William S. Branton Jr.
- Succeeded by: Annette Young

Personal details
- Born: December 14, 1958 (age 67) Summerville, South Carolina, U.S.
- Party: Democratic; Republican
- Children: 1
- Education: University of South Carolina

Thomas A. Limehouse Sr. (born December 14, 1958) is an American politician. A member of the Democratic Party and the Republican Party, he served in the South Carolina House of Representatives from 1985 to 1990.

== Life and career ==
Limehouse was born in Summerville, South Carolina, the son of T. C. Limehouse and Willie Mae Spivey. He attended the University of South Carolina, earning his BA degree in 1979 and his JD degree in 1982, which after earning his degrees, he worked as an attorney.

Limehouse served in the South Carolina House of Representatives from 1985 to 1990. He lost his seat in the House, in 1990, as a result of Operation Lost Trust, after pleading guilty to charges of conspiring to accept a bribe and tampering with a witness.
