= Elizabeth Munnerlyn =

American politician

Elizabeth R. Munnerlyn

Member of the South Carolina House of Representatives from the 54th district
- In office 2011 – November 2014
- Preceded by: Douglas Jennings Jr.
- Succeeded by: Pat Henegan

Personal details
- Born: June 20, 1969 (age 57) Bennettsville, South Carolina
- Party: Democratic
- Spouse: Ronald
- Education: Converse College; University of South Carolina
- Profession: Attorney

Elizabeth Munnerlyn is Democratic politician from South Carolina. She was a member of the South Carolina House of Representatives from 2011 to 2014. Munnerlyn was previously an assistant solicitor for the fourth circuit.
