= Tom Fernandez =

American politician

Member of the South Carolina Senate from the 39th district
- Incumbent
- Assumed office 2024
- Preceded by: Vernon Stephens

Personal details
- Party: Republican
- Education: Coastal Carolina University (BA); Charleston School of Law (JD); The Citadel (MBA)
- Profession: Attorney

Tom Fernandez is an American politician. He has been a member of the South Carolina Senate, representing the 39th District, since 2024 and is a member of the Republican Party.

== Background ==
Fernandez spent his youth on a farm in Michigan. He earned a Bachelor of Arts in political science from Coastal Carolina University, a Juris Doctor from Charleston School of Law, and a Master of Business Administration from The Citadel. He has been a board member of Central Berkeley Fire & EMS since 2023.

In 2021, Fernandez received a $315,000 settlement from the South Carolina Department of Transportation (SCDOT). Fernandez brought suit against the agency for violating his First Amendment rights when they deleted his comment and blocked him on their Facebook page. After paying his attorney fees, he donated the remainder of the settlement to the Whitesville Rural Fire Department.

== Political career ==
=== 2018 State House race ===
Fernandez challenged Republican incumbent Sylleste Davis in 2018 for a seat in the South Carolina House of Representatives, losing in the Republican primary.

=== 2024 State Senate race ===
On March 28, 2024, Fernandez filed to run for State Senate seat 39. He defeated Democratic incumbent Vernon Stephens to flip the Senate seat.

=== Member of the State Senate ===
Fernandez serves on the Senate Corrections and Penology, Education, Family and Veterans' Services, Judiciary and Medical Affairs committees.

In 2025, Fernandez voted against confirming Dr. Edward Simmer to lead the South Carolina Department of Public Health because Simmer had strongly recommended that people take COVID vaccines during the COVID pandemic and because he wore a face mask to protect his immunocompromised wife.

On June 14, 2025, Fernandez was filmed honking his horn and making obscene gestures while driving by a No Kings protest in Summerville, South Carolina. Fernandez said his behavior was in response to "heckling" from protesters.

On November 18, 2025, Fernandez voted in favor of Senate Bill 323, which sought to make abortion in South Carolina a felony punishable up to 30 years in prison and remove exceptions for sexual assault, incest, and fetal anomalies. The bill failed to secure the senatorial support needed to advance.
