= Talbot Smith =

American judge

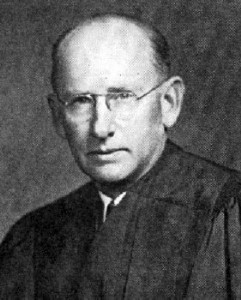

Senior Judge of the United States District Court for the Eastern District of Michigan
- In office October 31, 1971 – December 21, 1978

Judge of the United States District Court for the Eastern District of Michigan
- In office October 5, 1961 – October 31, 1971
- Appointed by: John F. Kennedy
- Preceded by: Seat established by 75 Stat. 80
- Succeeded by: Charles Wycliffe Joiner

Personal details
- Born: Talbot Smith; October 11, 1899 Fayette, Missouri
- Died: December 21, 1978 (aged 79)
- Education: United States Naval Academy (B.S.); Naval Postgraduate School (M.S.); University of Michigan Law School (J.D.)

Talbot Smith (October 11, 1899 – December 21, 1978) was a United States district judge of the United States District Court for the Eastern District of Michigan.

== Early life ==
Smith was born on October 11, 1899, in Fayette, Missouri. He received a Bachelor of Science degree from the United States Naval Academy in 1920. He graduated with a Master of Science from the Naval Postgraduate School in 1928. He received a Juris Doctor from University of Michigan Law School in 1934.

He was in the United States Navy as a Lieutenant from 1917 to 1931. He was an engineer with the Atlantic Refining Company in 1931.

== Career ==
After attending law school, Smith established a legal practice in Detroit, Michigan from 1934 to 1937. He was professor at the University of Missouri from 1937 to 1941. During World War II, he served with the Office of Price Administration from 1941 to 1944, overseeing civil litigation and acting as a hearing administrator with notable acumen.

Smith was in private practice in Ann Arbor, Michigan from 1944 to 1945. He was a professor at the University of California, Berkeley from 1945 to 1946. He returned to private practice in Ann Arbor from 1947 to 1955.

In 1955, Smith was appointed to the Michigan Supreme Court, securing election in 1956 and serving until 1961. His contributions extended beyond the bench, as he wrote for various legal periodicals and authored a volume in the Career Book Series titled “Lawyer” in 1961. Smith’s judicial opinions were marked by clarity and a touch of wry humor, as evidenced in a child neglect case where he wrote, “All of this is straight from outer space. It is pure fantasy. It is unrelated to life on this earth. It requires no treatise on child development to tell us that a child 2 years 8 months of age is as inquisitive as a hornet and as slippery as an eel .”

Wallace Riley, one of Smith’s former law clerks, described him as possessing “the infinite patience of a great teacher, the forgiveness of a minister, the sternness of a Naval officer, and the inspiration of a saint.”

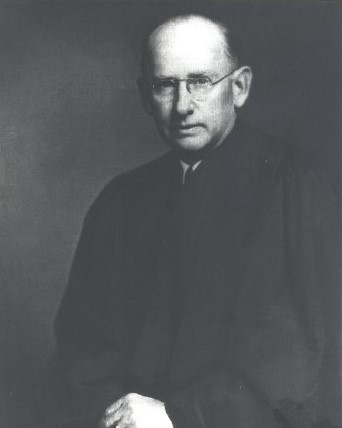
Judicial portrait of Smith, 1982.

Smith received a recess appointment from President John F. Kennedy on October 5, 1961, to the United States District Court for the Eastern District of Michigan, to a new seat created by 75 Stat. 80. He was nominated to the same seat by Kennedy on January 15, 1962. He was confirmed by the United States Senate on February 5, 1962, and received his commission on February 9, 1962. He assumed senior status on October 31, 1971, serving until he died.

== Personal life ==
In 1921, Smith wed Lola Hamlen, with whom he raised two children. Beyond his professional endeavors, he was deeply engaged in civic life, notably serving on the board of inquiry that investigated the South Michigan Prison Riot.

Smith died on December 21, 1978.

== Sources ==
Legal offices
| Preceded by Seat established by 75 Stat. 80 | Judge of the United States District Court for the Eastern District of Michigan; 1962–1971 | Succeeded by Charles Wycliffe Joiner |
