= Barbara Kloka Hackett =

American judge (1928–2018)

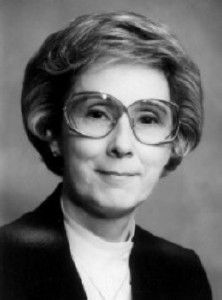

Senior Judge of the United States District Court for the Eastern District of Michigan
- In office April 8, 1997 – March 1, 2000

Judge of the United States District Court for the Eastern District of Michigan
- In office April 7, 1986 – April 8, 1997
- Appointed by: Ronald Reagan
- Preceded by: Charles Wycliffe Joiner
- Succeeded by: George Caram Steeh III

Magistrate Judge of the United States District Court for the Eastern District of Michigan
- In office 1973–1984

Personal details
- Born: March 17, 1928; Detroit, Michigan, U.S.
- Died: December 23, 2018 (aged 90); Brighton, Michigan, U.S.
- Education: University of Detroit (PhB, JD)

Barbara Kloka Hackett (March 17, 1928 – December 23, 2018) was a United States district judge of the United States District Court for the Eastern District of Michigan.

== Early life and education ==
Hackett was born in Detroit, the oldest of two daughters, and attended St. Gregory School in northwest Detroit. She completed a Bachelor of Philosophy from the University of Detroit in 1948 and a Juris Doctor from the University of Detroit School of Law in 1950.

== Career ==
Hackett was a staff lawyer for the Michigan-Wisconsin Pipeline Company from 1950 to 1951. She was a law clerk to Judge Frank Picard of the United States District Court for the Eastern District of Michigan from 1951 to 1952. She was in private practice in Detroit from 1952 to 1967. She was a lawyer for the New York Central Railroad Company from 1963 to 1965.

She was chief law clerk to the Michigan Court of Appeals from 1965 to 1966, and was an assistant prosecuting attorney of Wayne County, Michigan from 1967 to 1972. She then returned to private practice until 1973. After briefly serving as a magistrate judge, she later continued in private practice until 1986, when she was briefly acting chief of the Appellate Division of the Wayne County Prosecutor's Office.

=== Federal judicial service ===
Hackett served as a United States magistrate judge for the Eastern District of Michigan from 1973 to 1984, and was the first woman to serve in such a position.

On February 11, 1986, Hackett was nominated by President Ronald Reagan to a seat on the United States District Court for the Eastern District of Michigan vacated by Judge Charles Wycliffe Joiner. She was confirmed by the United States Senate on March 27, 1986, and received her commission on April 7, 1986. She assumed senior status on April 8, 1997. Hackett served in that capacity until her retirement on March 1, 2000.

During her career, Hackett presided over a number of high-profile cases. In 1987, she stripped former Nazi concentration camp guard Johann Leprich of his American citizenship; she also sentenced former New Jersey Mayor John McCann to life in prison without parole for operating an international cocaine smuggling scheme. In 1999 Hackett ruled that rap duo OutKast was not required to pay Rosa Parks for using her name in the title of their Grammy-winning song.

== Later life and death ==
After her retirement from the bench, Hackett practiced law in Venice, Florida. She was licensed and in good standing with the State Bar of Michigan, having been a licensed attorney since 1951. Hackett died on December 23, 2018, from declining health at her home in Brighton, Michigan. She was 90.

Legal offices
Preceded by Charles Wycliffe Joiner	Judge of the United States District Court for the Eastern District of Michigan; 1986–1997	Succeeded by George Caram Steeh III
