= Jack Rogers (politician) =

American politician (born 1937)

Member of the South Carolina House of Representatives for the 54th district
- In office 1972–1991
- Succeeded by: Douglas Jennings Jr.

Personal details
- Born: October 2, 1937 (age 88) Bennettsville, South Carolina, United States
- Party: Democratic
- Occupation: Attorney

John Irby Rogers III (born October 2, 1937) is a former American politician in the state of South Carolina. He served in the South Carolina House of Representatives as a member of the Democratic Party from 1972 to 1991. He is an attorney. He served a stint as speaker pro tempore of the House.

In 1991, Rogers was indicted as a result of an FBI corruption sting operation entitled Operation Lost Trust. He pleaded guilty to a charge of racketeering in 1991 and was sentenced to 45 months in prison.

== Personal life ==
Rogers was the son of John Irby Rogers Jr., a graduate of Clemson University.
