= Butzel Long =

Butzel Long, P.C.
- Headquarters: Detroit, Michigan
- No. of offices: 7
- No. of attorneys: 155
- Major practice areas: Litigation, corporate, labor and employment
- Key people: Paul Mersino, President & CEO
- Date founded: 1854
- Founder: William Austin Moore
- Company type: Professional corporation
- Website: www.butzel.com

Butzel Long, P.C. is an American law firm, based in Detroit, Michigan. Founded in 1854, the firm is among the oldest in Michigan, and today has 155 attorneys throughout the state, and in Washington, D.C. The firm is a founding member of Lex Mundi, one of the first and largest networks of leading independent law firms located in 180 separate jurisdictions around the world.

== Notable lawyers and alumni ==
- William L. Carpenter, justice on the Michigan Supreme Court
- Donald M. Dickinson, 34th United States postmaster general
- Melvin Hollowell, co-chair of the Michigan Democratic Party (2003–2004)
- Aghogho Edevbie, deputy Michigan Secretary of State (2023–present)
- Roger Gregory, chief judge of the United States Court of Appeals for the Fourth Circuit
- Rich Strenger, former National Football League offensive tackle
- Barbara L. McQuade, United States attorney for the Eastern District of Michigan
- Laurie J. Michelson, United States district judge on the United States District Court for the Eastern District of Michigan
- Christopher Taylor, mayor of Ann Arbor
- Charles B. Warren, former United States ambassador to Japan and United States ambassador to Mexico

== Offices ==
- Detroit, Michigan
- Troy, Michigan
- Ann Arbor, Michigan
- Grand Rapids, Michigan
- Lansing, Michigan
- South Haven, MI
- Niles, MI
- St. Joseph, MI
- Washington, D.C.
