= John W. Matthews Jr. =

American politician

John Wesley Matthews, Jr.
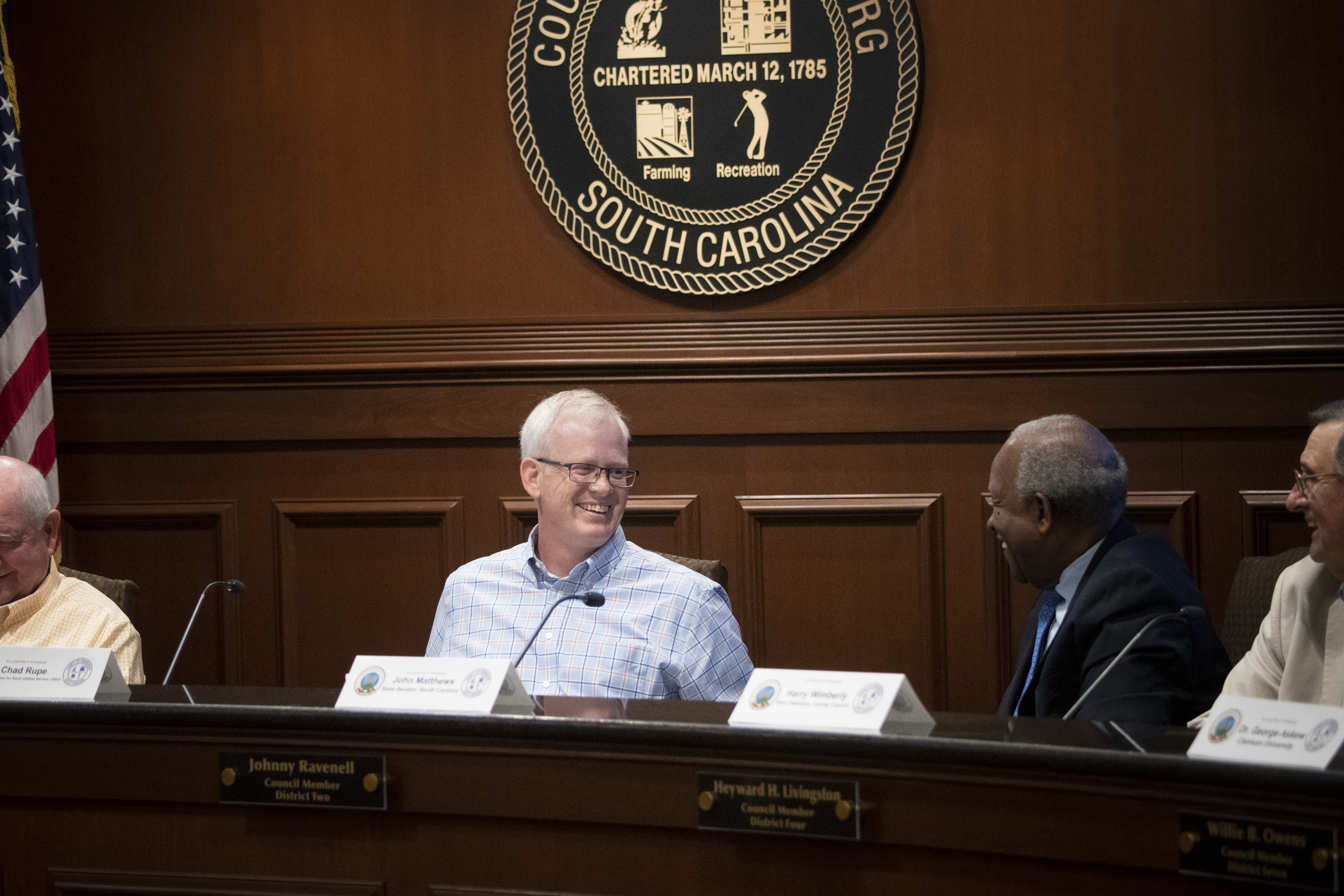

Member of the South Carolina Senate from the 39th district
- In office 1985–2021
- Succeeded by: Vernon Stephens (politician)

Member of the South Carolina House of Representatives from the 94th district
- In office 1975–1984
- Succeeded by: Kenneth E. Bailey Sr.

Personal details
- Born: April 21, 1940 (age 86) Bowman, South Carolina, U.S.
- Party: Democratic
- Spouse: Geraldine
- Profession: Farmer, educator, businessman

John Wesley Matthews, Jr. (born April 21, 1940) is a former Democratic member of the South Carolina Senate, representing the 39th District from 1985 to 2020.
