= Nicolau Sevcenko =

Brazilian historian, university professor, columnist, writer and translator

- Education: Universidade de São Paulo University of London

Nicolau Sevcenko (São Vicente, 1952 — São Paulo, August 13, 2014) was a Brazilian historian, university professor, columnist, writer, and translator.

Sevcenko specialized in the history of Brazilian culture and the social development of the cities of São Paulo and Rio de Janeiro. He graduated from the University of São Paulo (USP), where he also served as a professor of cultural history. He was also a member of the Center for Latin American Cultural Studies at King's College of the University of London. He also served as a visiting professor at Georgetown University, the University of Illinois Urbana-Champaign, and Harvard University.

For many years, he published a column in the Folha de S.Paulo.

== Biography ==
=== Early life ===
He was born in 1952 in São Vicente to a Ukrainian family that fled the Russian Civil War. He grew up in the city of São Paulo, in the working class district of Vila Prudente, which had a concentration of Slavs.

He graduated from the history program at the University of São Paulo (USP) in 1975. He earned his doctorate in social history in 1981, also from USP, with a thesis entitled: "Literatura como Missão: tensões sociais e criação cultural na Primeira República" (Literature as Mission: social tensions and cultural creation in the First Republic). In 1990, he performed post-doctoral work at the University of London.

=== Career ===
He lectured at the Pontifical Catholic University of São Paulo (PUC-SP) and the State University of Campinas (Unicamp).

He became a professor at USP in 1985, where he worked until his retirement in 2012. From 2010, he was a professor of Romance languages and literatures at Harvard University.

== Death ==
He died of a heart attack at his home August 13, 2014.

== Works ==
- Ana Maria Pacheco: gravuras, esculturas. Fundação Memorial da América Latina, 1995.
- A Corrida Para o Século XXI - No loop da montanha-russa. Companhia das Letras, 2001.
- Pindorama Revisitada - Cultura e Sociedade em Tempos de Virada. Fundação Peirópolis, 2000.
- História da Vida Privada no Brasil, vol. 3 - República: da Belle Époque à Era do Rádio (organizador) . Companhia das Letras, 1998.
- Literatura como missão: tensões sociais e criação cultural na I República. São Paulo, Brasiliense, 4ª ed., 1995. Companhia das Letras, 2003.
- O Renascimento. São Paulo/Campinas, Atual/ Editora da Unicamp, 21ª ed., 1995.
- Arte Moderna: os desencontros de dois continentes. São Paulo, Fundação Memorial da América Latina, Coleção Memo, Secretaria de Estado da Cultura, 1995.
- Orfeu Extático na Metrópole - São Paulo nos Frementes Anos 20. Companhia das Letras, 1992.
- Lewis Carroll - Alice no país das maravilhas (tradução). São Paulo, Scipione, 1986.
- A Revolta da Vacina, mentes insanas em corpos rebeldes. São Paulo, Brasiliense, 1984; Scipione, 1993; Editora UNESP, 2018.
- Robert Mandrou - Magistrados e feiticeiros na França do século XVII (tradução). São Paulo, Perspectiva, 1979.

In 1999, he won the Prêmio Jabuti in the category of human sciences for his book The History of Private Life in Brazil (volumes 3 and 4), published by Companhia das Letras.
