= Vernon Stephens (politician) =

American politician

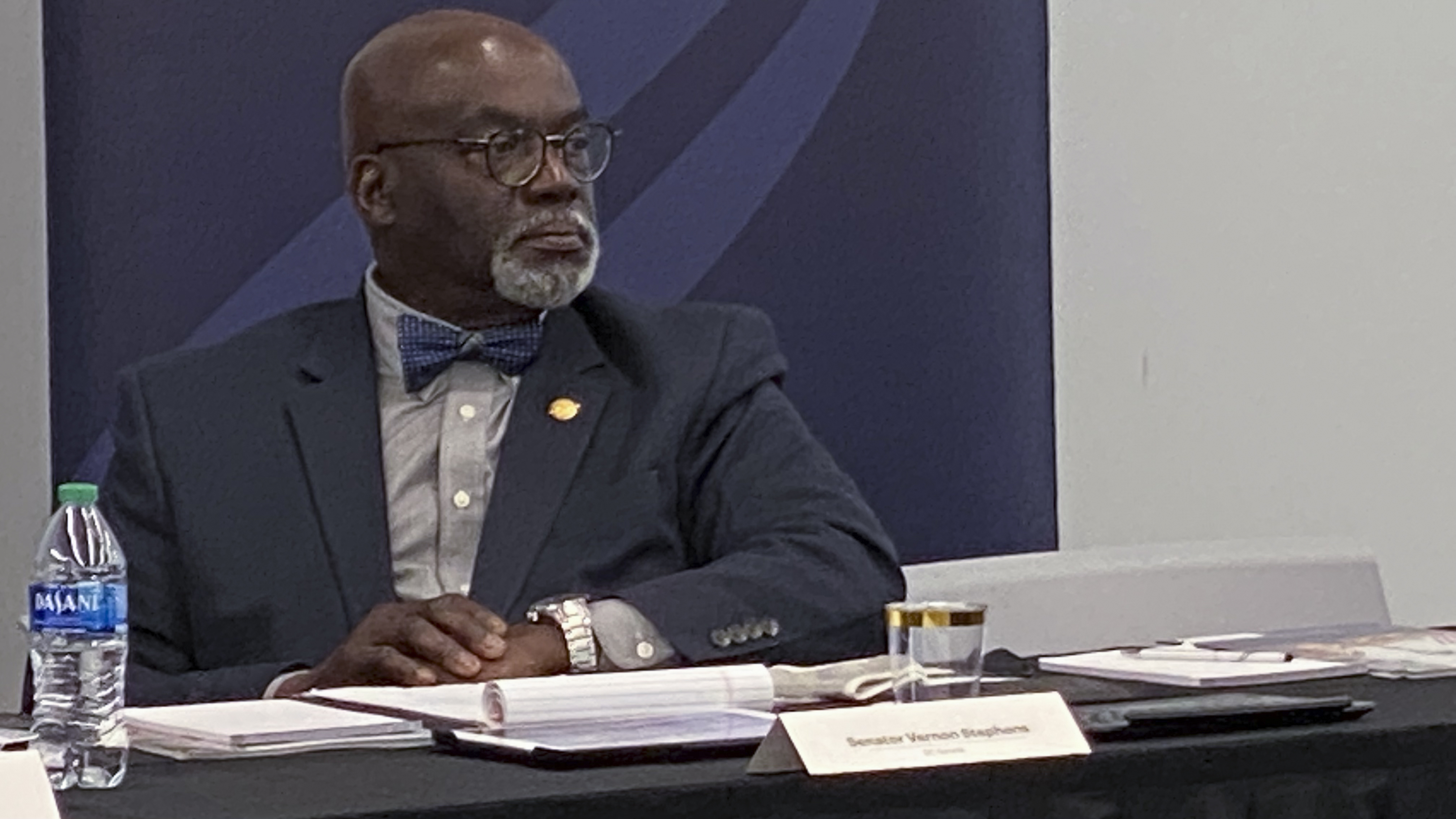

Member of the South Carolina Senate from the 39th district
- In office November 9, 2020 – November 6, 2024
- Preceded by: John W. Matthews Jr.
- Succeeded by: Tom Fernandez

Personal details
- Born: December 14, 1957 (age 68) Bowman, South Carolina, U.S.
- Party: Democratic
- Education: South Carolina State University (B.S.)

Vernon Stephens (born December 14, 1957) is an American politician. He was a member of the South Carolina Senate from the 39th District, serving from 2021 to 2024. He is a member of the Democratic Party.

Stephens served as the Parliamentarian of the South Carolina Legislative Black Caucus.

== Electoral history ==
=== 2020 South Carolina Senate ===
This seat was one of three open seats in this election cycle. Stephens was one of four candidates to run in the Democratic primary, finishing first to advance to a runoff against Cindy Evans.

Democratic Primary
Party	Candidate	Votes	%
Democratic	Vernon Stephens	4,901	41.4
Democratic	Cindy Evans	4,624	38.8
Democratic	William Johnson	1,864	15.6
Democratic	Jerry Montgomery	532	4.5
Total votes		11,921	100.0

Democratic Primary Runoff
Party	Candidate	Votes	%
Democratic	Vernon Stephens	3,968	65.2
Democratic	Cindy Evans	2,120	34.8
Total votes		6,088	100.0

General Election
Party	Candidate	Votes	%
Democratic	Vernon Stephens	24,807	56.2
Republican	Tom Connor	19,267	43.7
Write-in		38	0.1
Total votes		44,112	100.0
Democratic hold			

=== 2024 South Carolina Senate ===
Stephens was defeated by Republican challenger Tom Fernandez in the general election.
