= Michael Del Priore =

American portrait artist

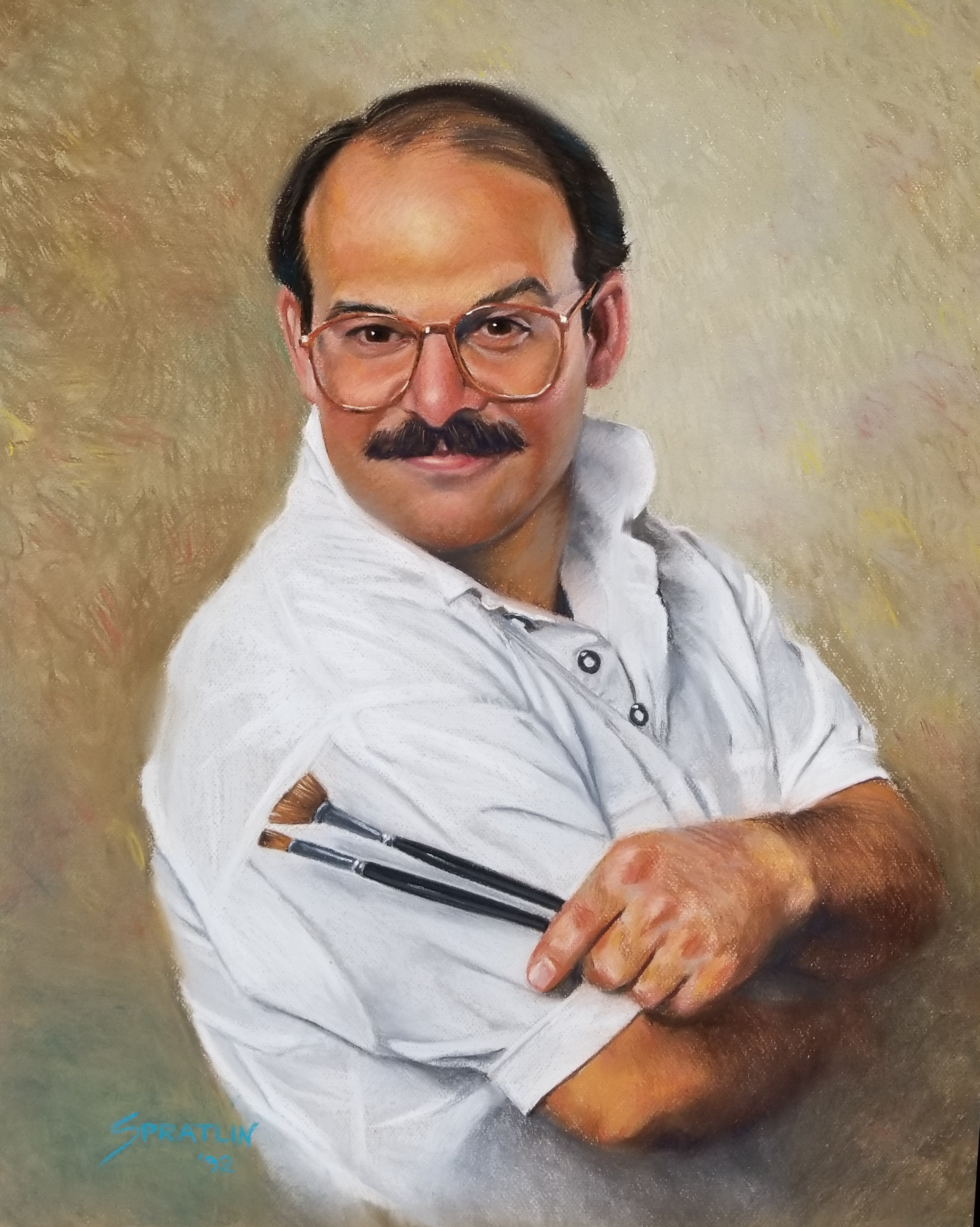
- Michael Del Priore pastel portrait by Harry Spratlin
- Born: 1954
- Died: May 26, 2020 (aged 65–66); Greenville, SC
- Known for: Portraits
- Style: Classical Realism

Michael Del Priore (1954–May 26, 2020, born in Columbia, SC) was an American master portrait artist with an international reputation, known for oil and pastel portraits in the Classical Realism style.

== Notability ==
Del Priore was recognized as "one of America's top portrait artists". A master of the alla prima approach made famous by John Singer Sargent, he achieved many singular accomplishments, among them, painting nationally known subjects in the public sector.

Del Priore lived in Fork Shoals, in upstate South Carolina, however, he garnered international acclaim in his 40+ year career by doing over 850 oil portraits that included Members of Congress, Supreme Court Justices, Governors, clergy, educators, physicians, cultural, corporate, and community leaders. 24 of his works are listed in the National Portrait Gallery Catalog of American Portraits.

== Official portraits ==
Del Priore's most notable portraits include President Ronald Reagan, Microsoft CEO Bill Gates and former Speaker of the House, Representative John Boehner.

Thirteen of his official portraits are in the art collection of the U. S. House of Representatives, the largest number by a single artist in U. S. history.

Ten of his works are displayed in the South Carolina Statehouse art collection. Five are in the Senate Chamber, including acclaimed Senators: Edward E. Saleeby, John Drummond, and John W. Matthews, Jr. Paintings of U. S. Senators Strom Thurmond and Ernest F. "Fritz" Hollings, both former governors are also hung in the Senate Chamber. Del Priore's official paintings in the House Chamber include President Ronald Reagan and former House Speakers, David H. Wilkins and Robert J. Sheheen. In the lobby between the two chambers are Del Priore paintings of U. S. Representative, William Jennings Bryan Dorn, and famed Midlands educator Wil Lou Gray.

Del Priore painted portraits for eight of South Carolina's Governors: Strom Thurmond, Ernest F. "Fritz" Hollings, Donald S. Russell, Robert Evander McNair, James B. Edwards, Richard Riley, Carroll A. Campbell Jr., and David Beasley

== Career ==
Del Priore's artistic talents were evident in his childhood. After graduating from Columbia High School in 1972, he got a job locally as an advertising artist with J.B. White's department store, producing art for The State newspaper, and did freelance art for local businesses. During this time, he befriended established portrait artist Gian Cassone after observing him painting exceptional portraits in a booth at Richland Mall. Cassone, who had studied at the Art Institute of Chicago and the Accademia di Belle Arti in Florence, Italy, saw Del Priore's raw talent but noted his lack of experience and told him to, "Go home and draw a thousand heads, then I'll teach you what you need to know." Del Priore completed the huge task, returning in just six weeks. Cassone never expected to see him again, but made good on his promise, introducing Del Priore to master techniques of portrait painting in oil and pastel. Under Cassone's tutelage, he completed hundreds of portraits during a 5-year stint at the mall location. In 1979, Del Priore was commissioned to paint his first nationally known, publicly elected official when Congressman William Jennings Bryan Dorn commissioned him to do his portrait for permanent display in the lobby of the new Dorn VA Hospital in Columbia, named in his honor.

In 1980, on Cassone's recommendation, Del Priore moved to Charleston to study oil painting at the Gibbes Museum of Art under the late Ray Goodbred, who had studied at the Art Students League under Ogden Pleissner and Robert Brackman, maintained dual residences in New York and Charleston at the time. Goodbred taught him master skills including palette organization, anatomy basics and manipulation of brushes by painting from live models and doing still life studies.

After returning to Columbia in 1984, Del Priore entered a competition announced in The State newspaper for artists to do an official oil portrait of former governor, U. S. Senator Strom Thurmond for the Senate Chamber of the South Carolina Statehouse, honoring his 50th year of public service. Over 200 artists responded. The selection narrowed to two, Del Priore and famed portraitist, Robert Bruce Williams of Washington, DC. "In this case, being a South Carolinian worked to my advantage," said Del Priore. "Because Senator Thurmond was famous for supporting constituents from his home state, he chose me. Afterward, the positive response I received from the public helped me move from the mall to a studio, as I no longer had to search for commissions. It was a great blessing and a major milestone in my career."

Del Priore established professional relationships with America's leading portrait artists, studying with the late John Howard Sanden, the late Daniel Greene, the late Richard Whitney, the late Nelson Shanks, the late Everett Raymond Kinstler, and many others. Throughout his career, he lectured and gave portrait demonstrations at the University of South Carolina, the Columbia Museum of Art; The Metropolitan Museum of Art, and the Art Students League of New York; the Academy of Art University in San Francisco and the Palette and Chisel Academy of Fine Art in Chicago.

== Gallery ==
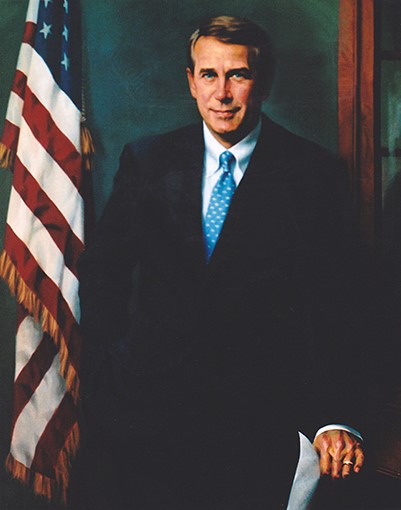
Congressman John Boehner

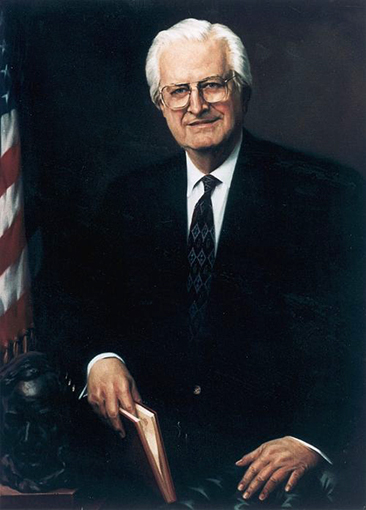
Congressman Henry Hyde

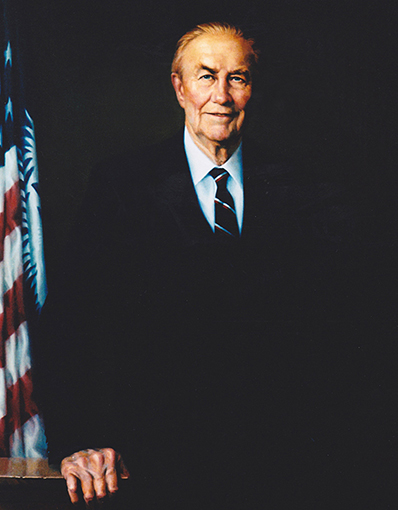
U. S. Senator Strom Thurmond

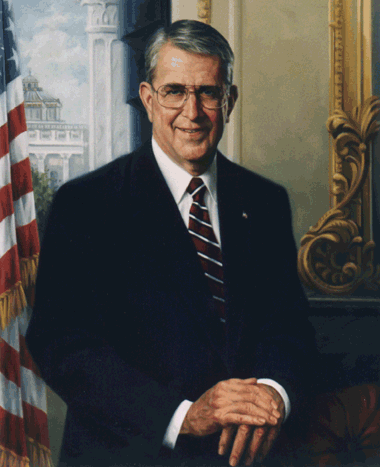
Congressman Gerald Solomon

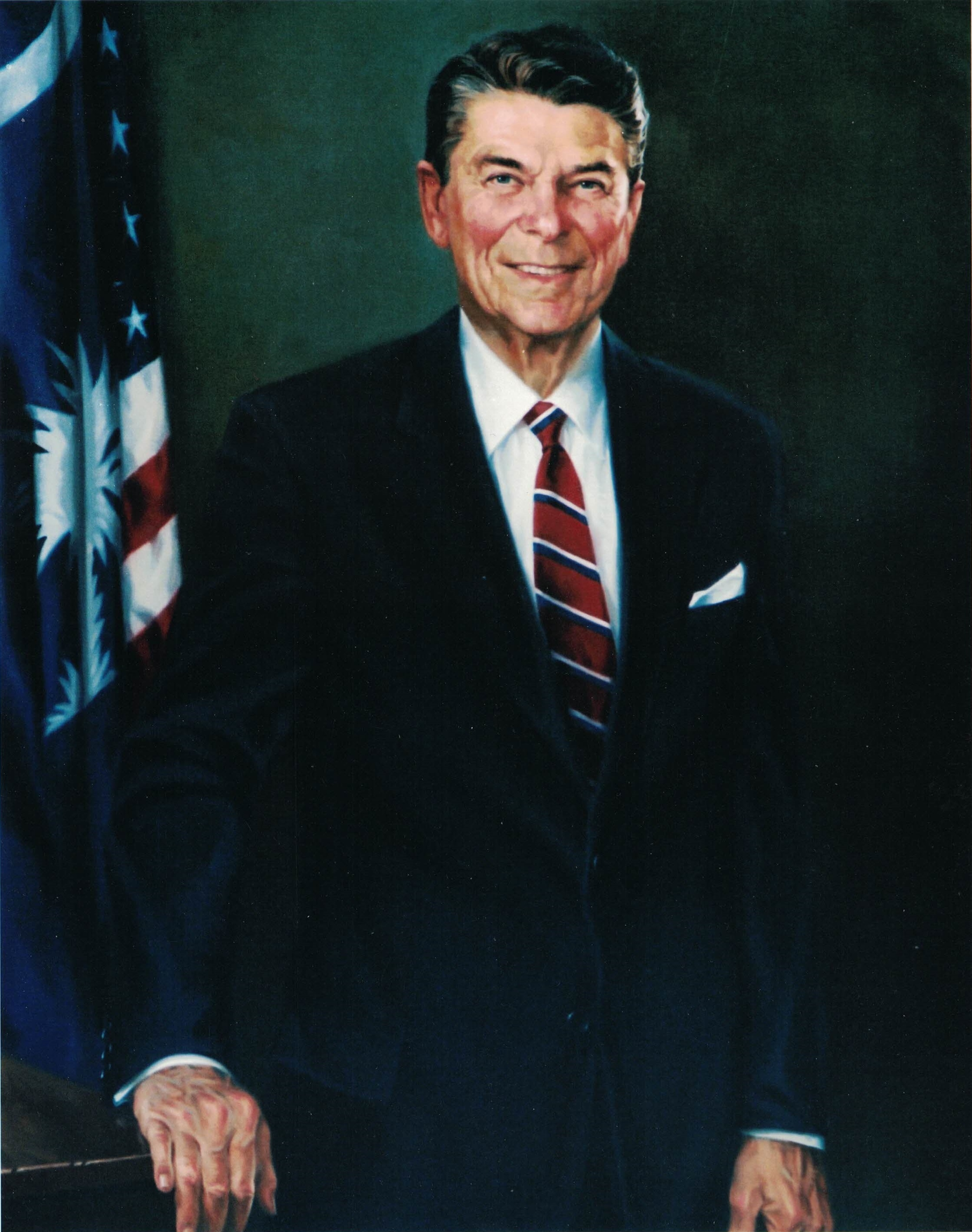
President Ronald Reagan

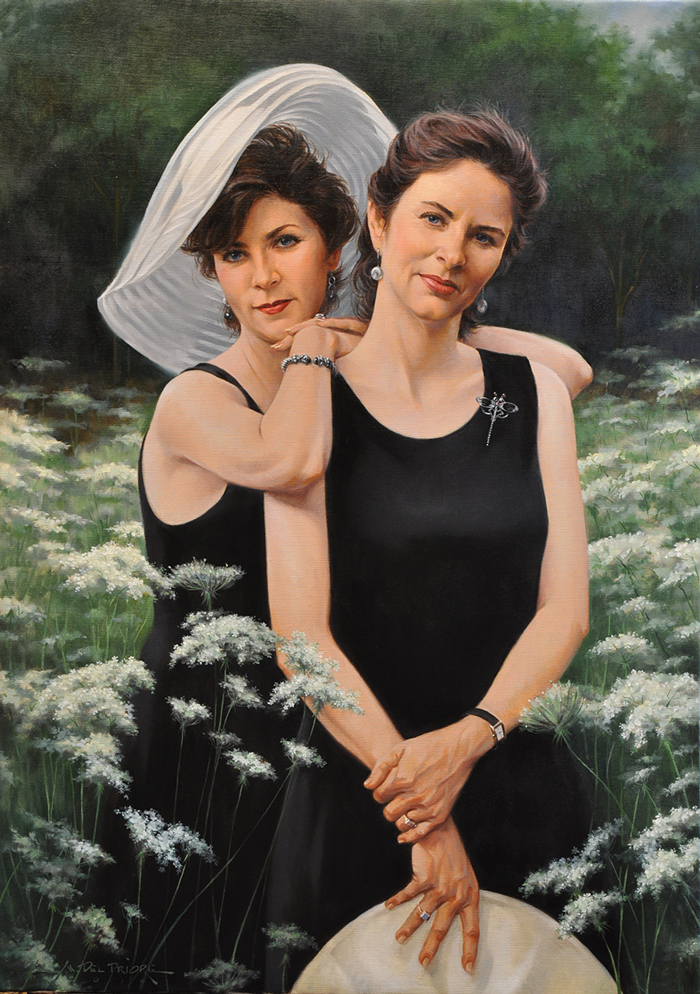
Sisters: Susan and Jan

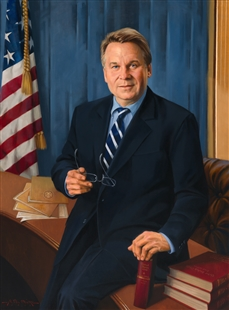
Congressman Chris Smith

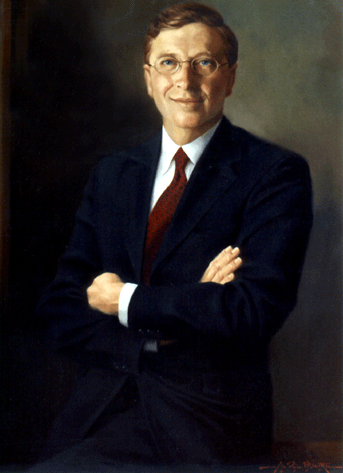
Microsoft CEO Bill Gates

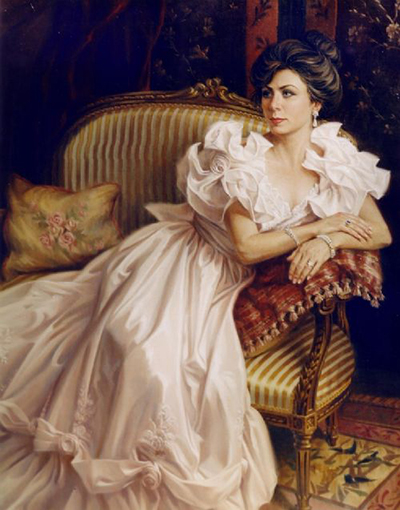
Susan Kissimon

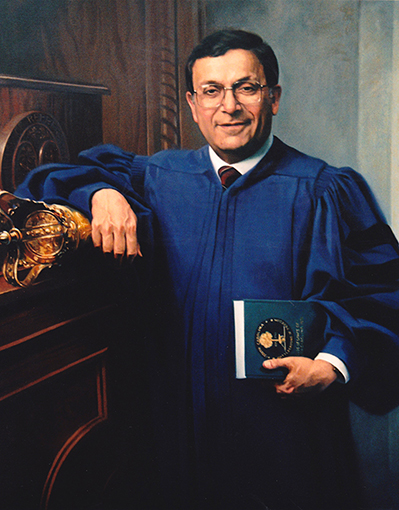
South Carolina Speaker of the House, Bob Sheheen

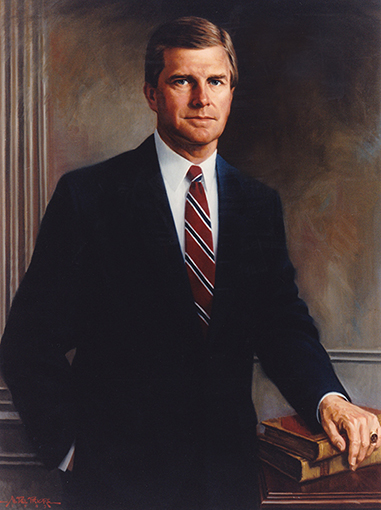
Carroll A. Campbell, 112th Governor of South Carolina

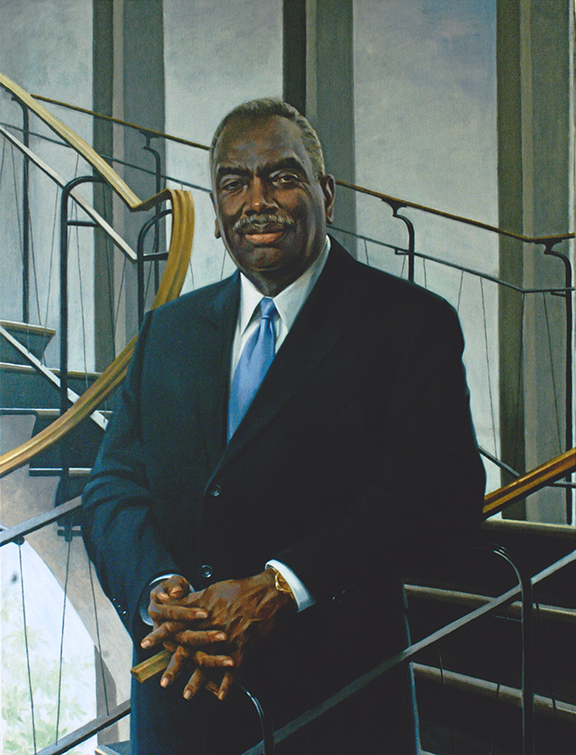
George R. Johnson, Jr., Dean Emeritus, Elon University School of Law

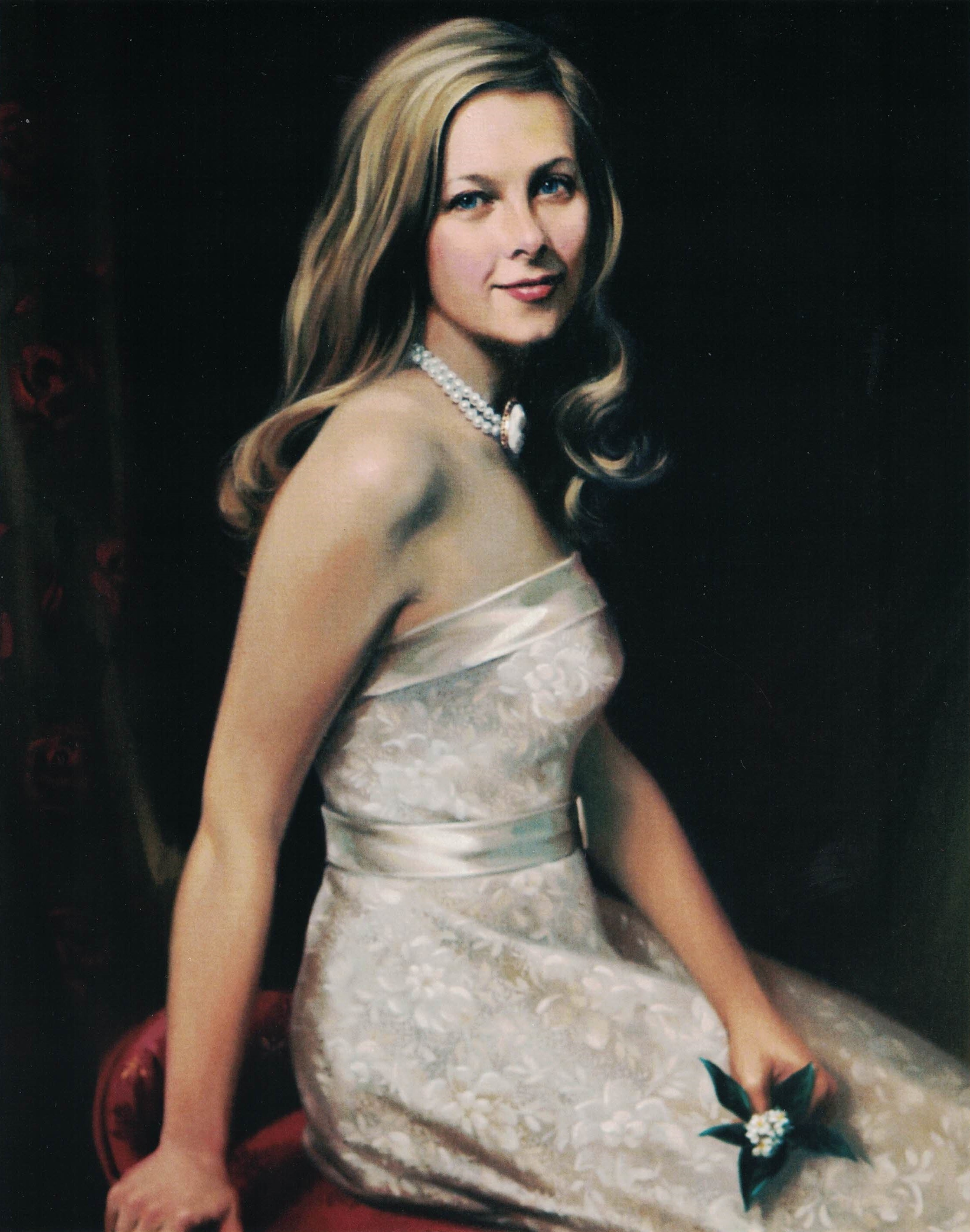
Sidney Heyward

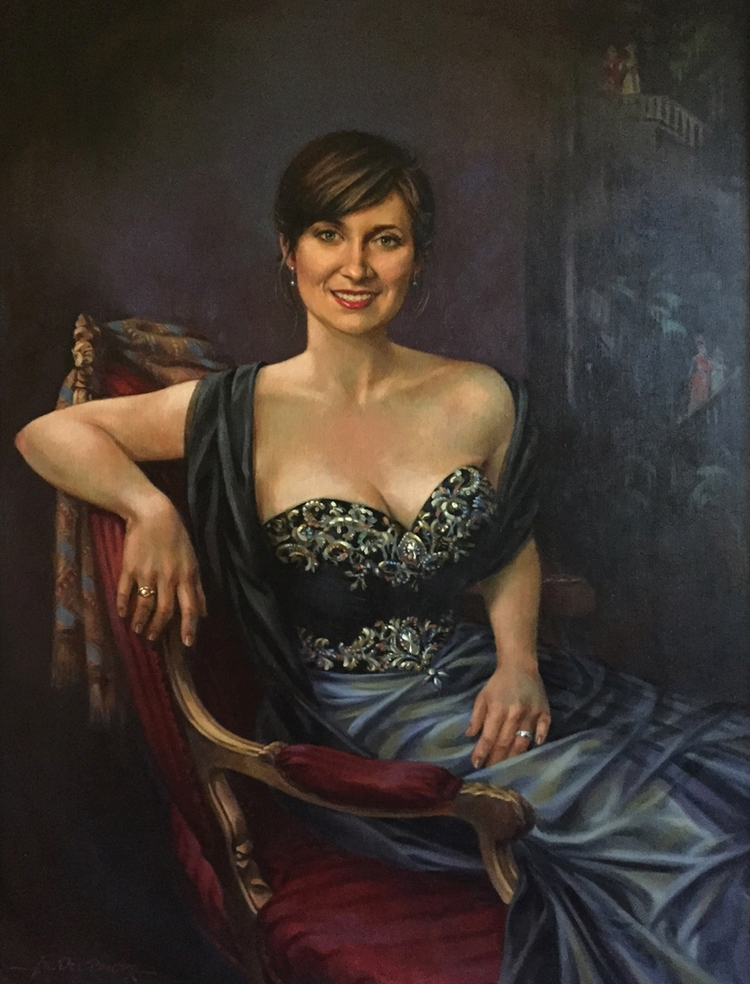
Virginia James

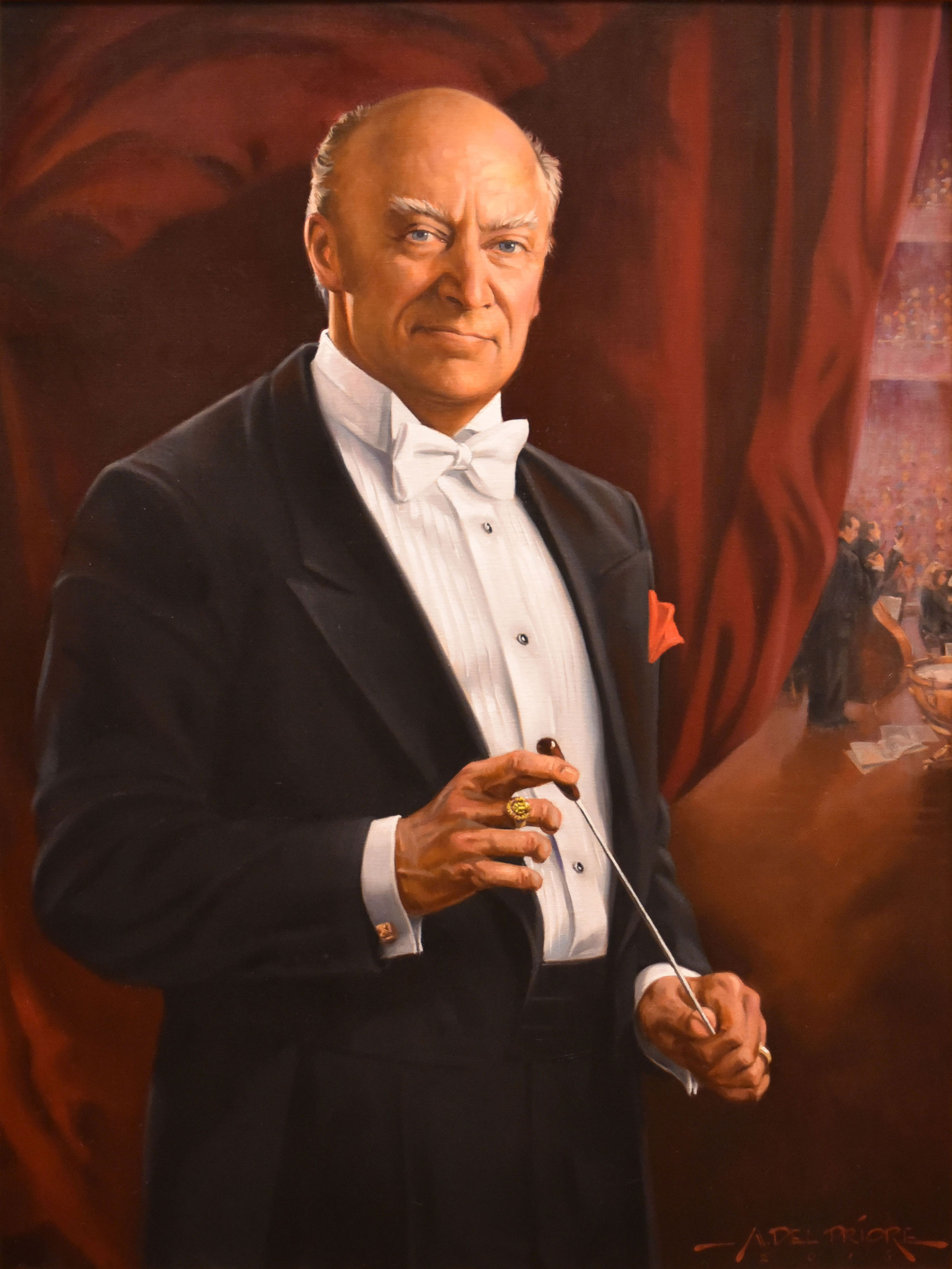
Maestro Edvard Tchivzhel

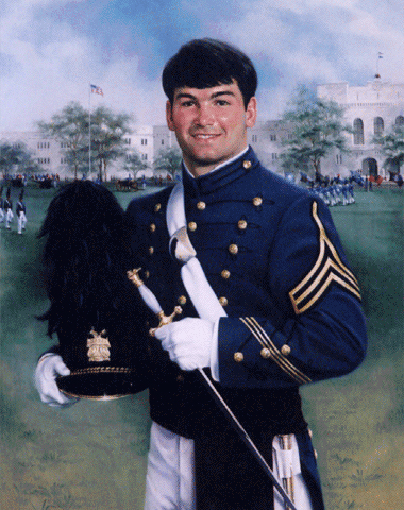
Anthony Del Priore

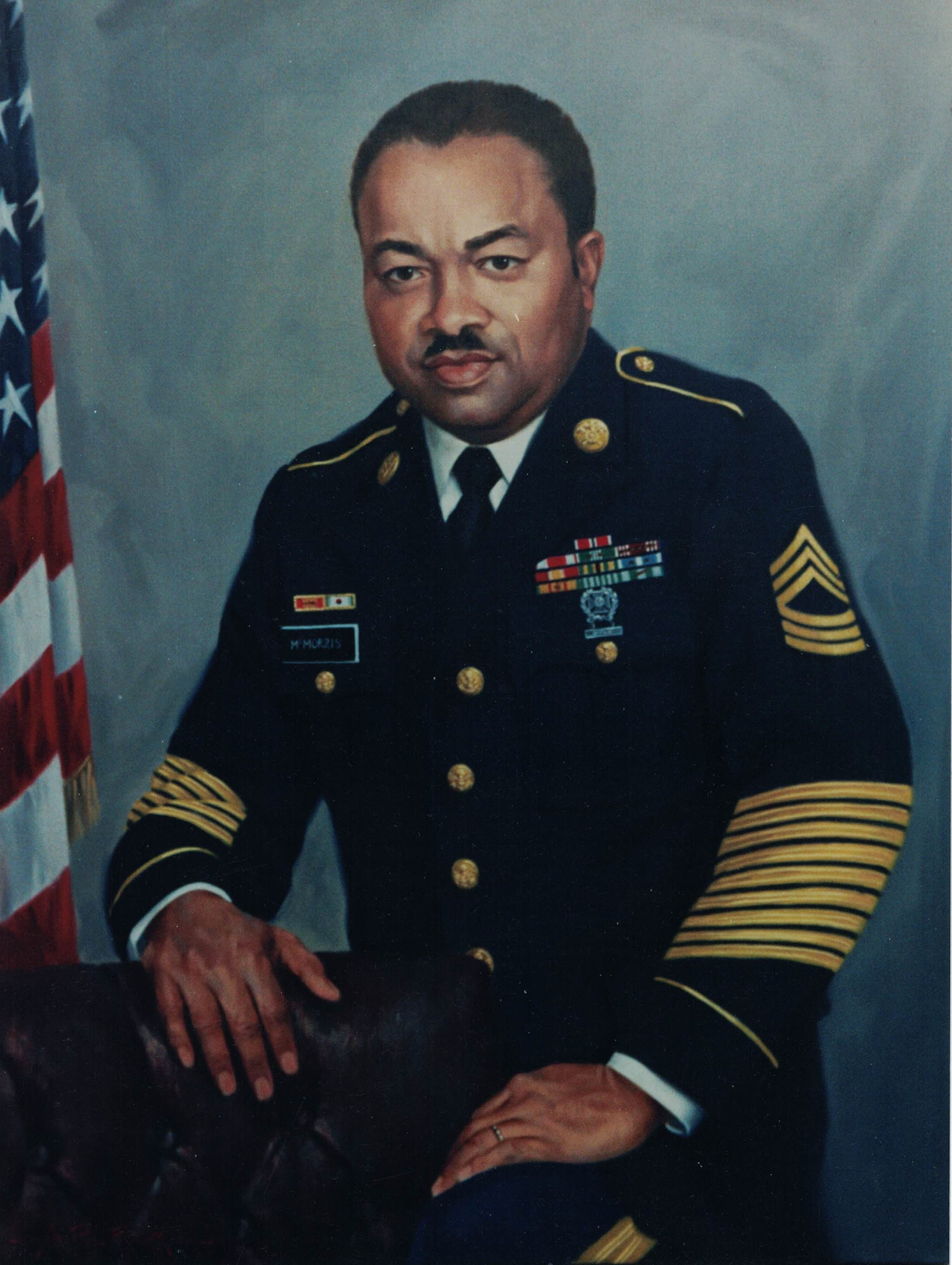
SSGT Melvin Morris, Medal of Honor Recipient

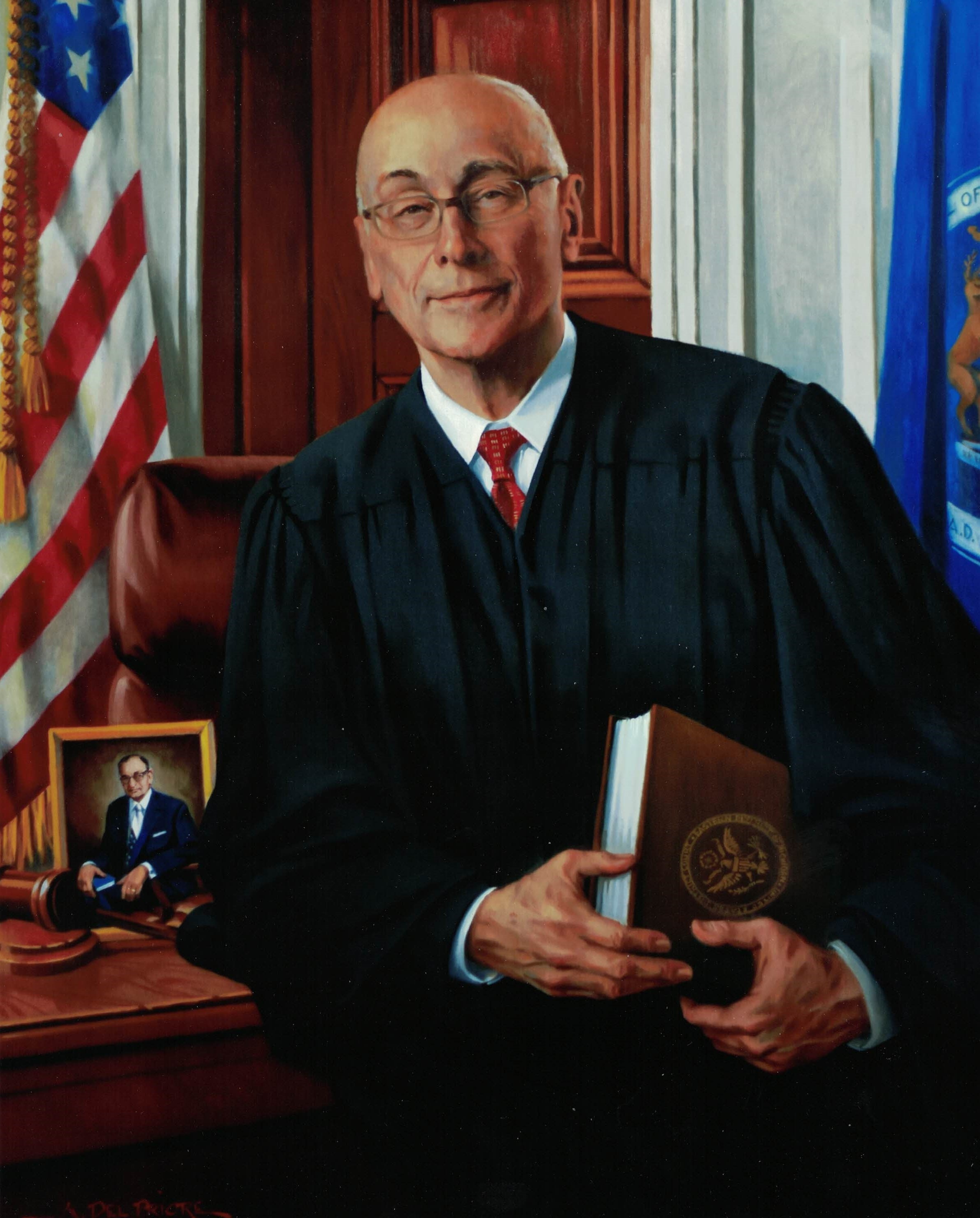
Justice Paul D. Borman

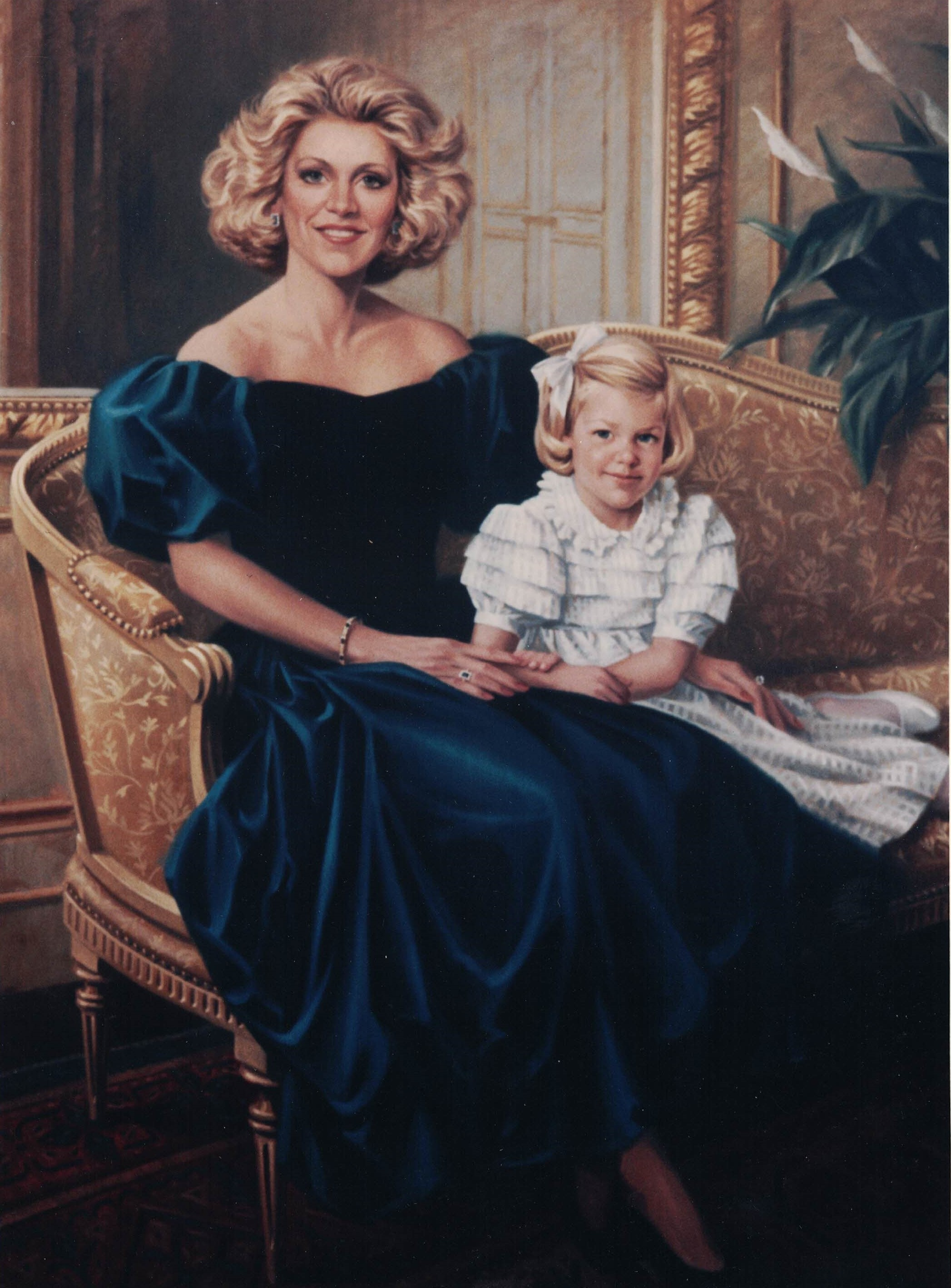
Mrs. Wilson and Elizabeth

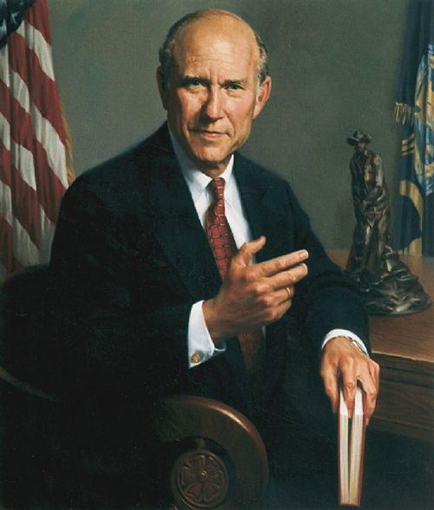
Congressman Pat Roberts

== Honors ==
Del Priore was past chairman and served on the board of directors of the American Society of Portrait Artists (now known as the Portrait Society of America). He was a member of the Artists Fellowship Society of New York and is listed in the Who's Who of American Artists. He served as executive director of the Palmetto Area Cultural Arts Center in Williamston, SC. In 2018, South Carolina Governor Henry McMaster presented him the Order of the Palmetto, the highest honor given by the governor in recognition of his lifetime achievements in the arts.
