= Kenneth Kennedy (politician) =

American politician

Kenneth "Ken" Kennedy

Member of the South Carolina House of Representatives from the 101st district
- In office 1991–2010
- Preceded by: Benjamin J. Gordon Jr
- Succeeded by: Ronnie A. Sabb

Personal details
- Born: September 15, 1942 (age 84) Greeleyville, South Carolina, United States
- Died: May 17, 2015 Greeleyville, South Carolina
- Party: Democratic
- Education: Benedict College; Brooklyn College (J.D.)
- Profession: Businessman

Kenneth "Ken" Kennedy (September 15, 1942 - May 17, 2015) was a businessman and American politician.

== Political career ==
Kennedy was elected to Williamsburg County Council in 1994, and served until 1991. He was a member of the Democratic party, and from 1987 to 1990, Kennedy chaired the Williamsburg County, South Carolina Democratic Party.

Kennedy served as a member of the South Carolina House of Representatives from the 101st District, serving from 1991 to 2010. Kennedy retired in 2010, opting not to seek re-election.

== Community service ==
Kennedy's community contributions included service on the Greeleyville Medical Center Board of Directors, and on the University of South Carolina Substance Abuse Advisory Council.

== Death ==
Kennedy died on May 17, 2015.

South Carolina House of Representatives
| Preceded by Benjamin J. Gordon Jr | Member of the South Carolina House of Representatives from the 101st district 1991–2010 | Succeeded by Ronnie A. Sabb |
