= Jefferson M. Long Jr. =

American politician (1927–2003)

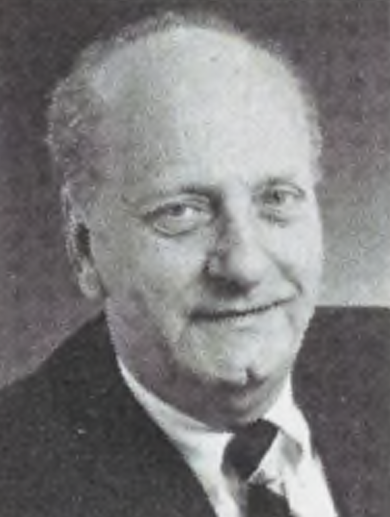
- Long in 1988

Member of the South Carolina Senate from the 33rd district
- In office 1985–1991
- Preceded by: District established
- Succeeded by: Luke A. Rankin

Personal details
- Born: Jefferson Marion Long Jr. March 5, 1927 Loris, South Carolina, U.S.
- Died: April 25, 2003 (aged 76) Horry County, South Carolina, U.S.
- Party: Democratic
- Education: University of South Carolina

Jefferson Marion Long Jr. (March 5, 1927 – April 25, 2003) was an American politician. A member of the Democratic Party, he served in the South Carolina Senate from 1985 to 1990.

== Life and career ==
Long was born in Loris, South Carolina, the son of Jefferson Marion Long Sr., an attorney and Mary Liles Miller, a teacher. He attended and graduated from Myrtle Beach High School. After graduating, he served in the United States Navy during World War II, which after his discharge, he attended the University of South Carolina, earning his LLB degree in 1950.

Long served in the South Carolina Senate from 1985 to 1991. He lost his seat in the Senate, in 1991, as a result of Operation Lost Trust, after pleading guilty to accepting a $42,000 bribe.

== Death ==
Long died on April 25, 2003, in Horry County, South Carolina, at the age of 76.
