= Eutawville, South Carolina =

- Town
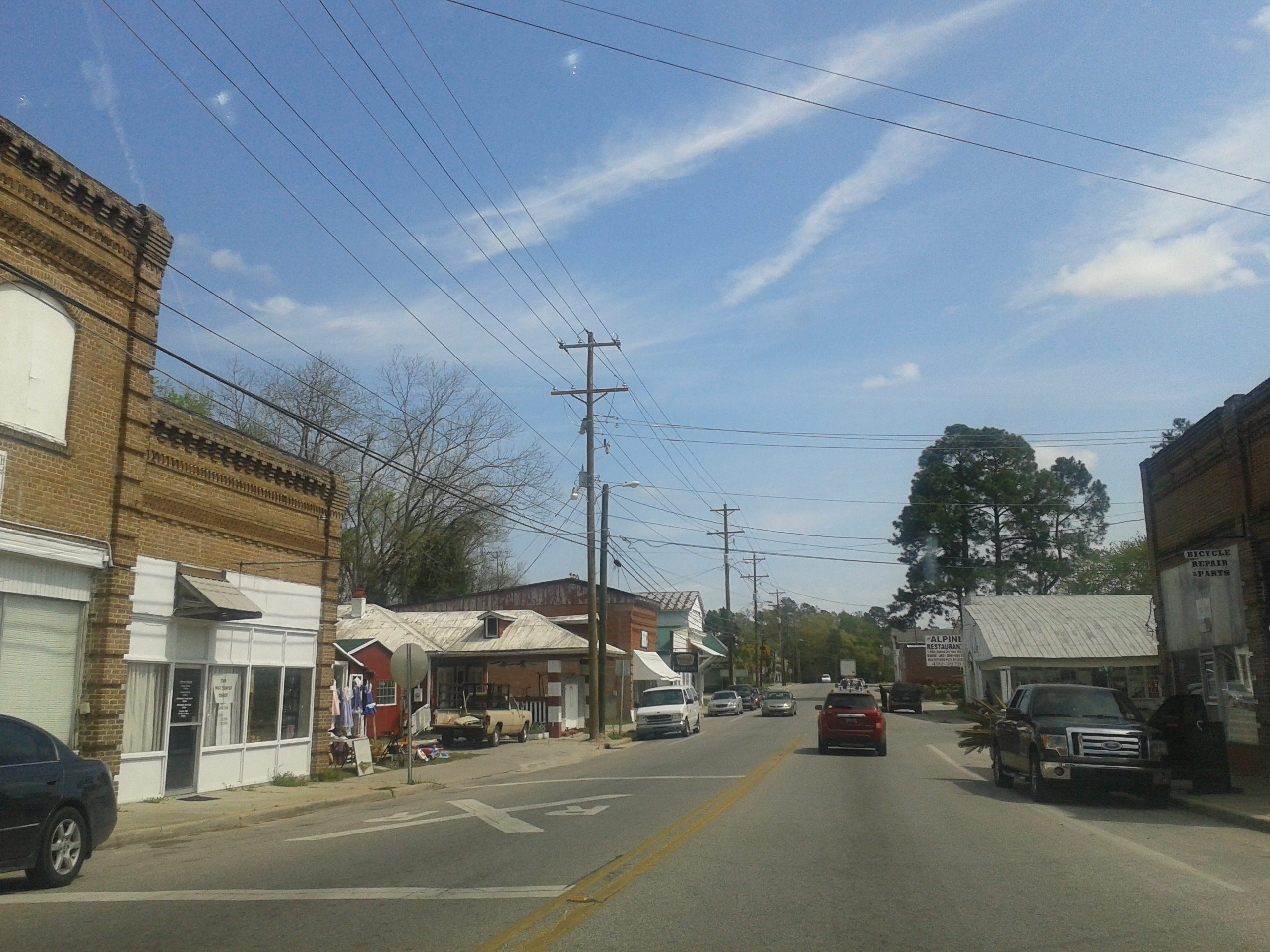
- Central Eutawville in April 2015

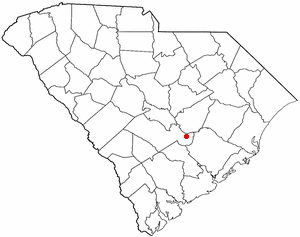
- Location of Eutawville, South Carolina
- Coordinates: 33°24′N 80°21′W
- Country: United States
- State: South Carolina
- County: Orangeburg

Area
  - Total: 0.95 sq mi (2.47 km^{2})
  - Land: 0.95 sq mi (2.47 km^{2})
  - Water: 0 sq mi (0.00 km^{2})
- Elevation: 108 ft (33 m)

Population (2020)
  - Total: 235
  - Density: 247/sq mi (95.3/km^{2})
- Time zone: UTC-5 (Eastern (EST))
  - Summer (DST): UTC-4 (EDT)
- ZIP code: 29048
- Area codes: 803, 839
- FIPS code: 45-24100
- GNIS feature ID: 2406471
- Website: www.eutawvillesc.org

Eutawville /juːˈtoʊvəl/ is a town in Orangeburg County, South Carolina, United States. Prior to 1910, Eutawville was located in the northwest portion of Saint James Goose Creek Township, Berkeley County. As of the 2020 census, Eutawville had a population of 235.

== History ==
Eutawville takes its name from the Eutaw Spring.

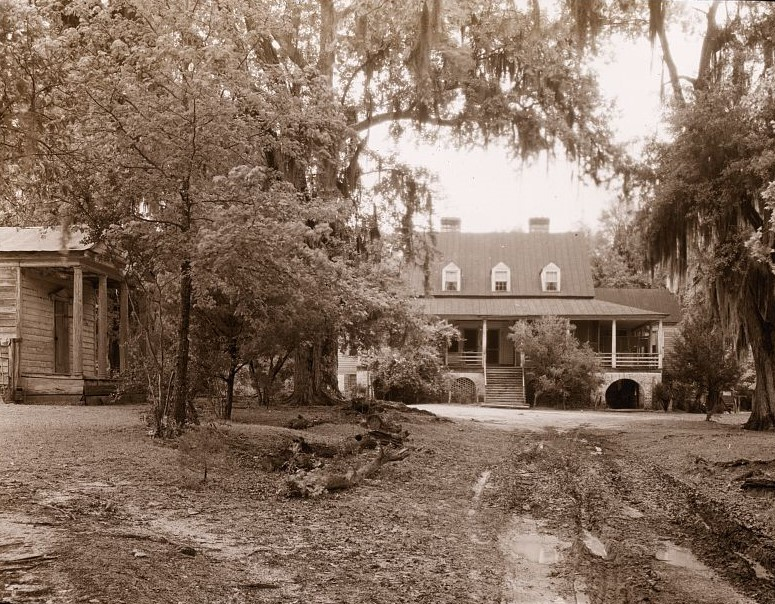
"The Eutaw," William Henry Sinkler house, Eutawville vicinity, by Frances Benjamin Johnston, 1938

James Sinkler (died 1752) moved to America from Scotland in the early 1700s and settled near Bonneau, South Carolina. James Sinkler (1740–1800) and his wife Margaret Cantey moved to Upper St. John's Parish in 1785. William Sinkler (1787–1853), son of James and Margaret Cantey Sinkler and in turn his son, William Henry, owned Belvidere plantation in Eutawville.

Eutawville was the site of the Battle of Eutaw Springs in 1781 during the American Revolutionary War. It was the last battle in the field in the southern states during the war.

Eutaw Springs Battleground Park, Numertia Plantation, and St. Julien Plantation are listed on the National Register of Historic Places.

== Geography ==
Eutawville is located near the Santee River.

According to the United States Census Bureau, the town has a total area of 0.9 square miles (2.3 km^{2}), all land.

== Demographics ==
Historical population
Census	Pop.	Note	%±
1890	224		—
1900	305		36.2%
1910	405		32.8%
1920	285		−29.6%
1930	327		14.7%
1940	496		51.7%
1950	478		−3.6%
1960	468		−2.1%
1970	386		−17.5%
1980	615		59.3%
1990	350		−43.1%
2000	344		−1.7%
2010	315		−8.4%
2020	235		−25.4%
U.S. Decennial Census

=== 2020 census ===
Eutawville town, South Carolina – Racial and ethnic composition Note: the US Census treats Hispanic/Latino as an ethnic category. This table excludes Latinos from the racial categories and assigns them to a separate category. Hispanics/Latinos may be of any race.
Race / Ethnicity (NH = Non-Hispanic)	Pop 2000	Pop 2010	Pop 2020	% 2000	% 2010	% 2020
White alone (NH)	226	189	138	65.70%	60.00%	58.72%
Black or African American alone (NH)	111	113	75	32.27%	35.87%	31.91%
Native American or Alaska Native alone (NH)	1	0	0	0.29%	0.00%	0.00%
Asian alone (NH)	0	0	7	0.00%	0.00%	2.98%
Native Hawaiian or Pacific Islander alone (NH)	0	0	0	0.00%	0.00%	0.00%
Other race alone (NH)	0	0	0	0.00%	0.00%	0.00%
Mixed race or Multiracial (NH)	4	2	12	1.16%	0.63%	5.11%
Hispanic or Latino (any race)	2	11	3	0.58%	3.49%	1.28%
Total	344	315	235	100.00%	100.00%	100.00%

=== 2000 census ===
As of the census of 2000, there were 344 people, 134 households, and 92 families residing in the town. The population density was 371.7 inhabitants per square mile (143.5/km^{2}). There were 161 housing units at an average density of 174.0 per square mile (67.2/km^{2}). The racial makeup of the town was 65.99% White, 32.27% African American, 0.29% Native American, 0.29% from other races, and 1.16% from two or more races. Hispanic or Latino of any race were 0.58% of the population.

There were 134 households, out of which 27.6% had children under the age of 18 living with them, 47.0% were married couples living together, 18.7% had a female householder with no husband present, and 30.6% were non-families. 27.6% of all households were made up of individuals, and 11.2% had someone living alone who was 65 years of age or older. The average household size was 2.57 and the average family size was 3.11.

In the town, the population was spread out, with 26.2% under the age of 18, 8.4% from 18 to 24, 23.5% from 25 to 44, 26.7% from 45 to 64, and 15.1% who were 65 years of age or older. The median age was 40 years. For every 100 females, there were 84.9 males. For every 100 females age 18 and over, there were 91.0 males.

The median income for a household in the town was $21,136, and the median income for a family was $36,354. Males had a median income of $26,458 versus $21,750 for females. The per capita income for the town was $12,352. About 21.8% of families and 28.1% of the population were below the poverty line, including 34.0% of those under age 18 and 30.6% of those age 65 or over.

== Climate ==
The climate in this area is characterized by relatively high temperatures and evenly distributed precipitation throughout the year. According to the Köppen Climate Classification system, Eutawville has a Humid subtropical climate, abbreviated "Cfa" on climate maps.

Climate data for Eutawville, South Carolina
Month	Jan	Feb	Mar	Apr	May	Jun	Jul	Aug	Sep	Oct	Nov	Dec	Year
Mean daily maximum °C (°F)	15 (59)	16 (60)	20 (68)	24 (75)	28 (83)	32 (89)	32 (90)	32 (90)	30 (86)	25 (77)	20 (68)	16 (60)	24 (75)
Mean daily minimum °C (°F)	2 (36)	3 (37)	7 (44)	11 (51)	15 (59)	19 (67)	21 (70)	21 (69)	18 (64)	12 (53)	6 (42)	2 (36)	11 (52)
Average precipitation cm (inches)	7.6 (3)	9.4 (3.7)	9.1 (3.6)	7.9 (3.1)	8.9 (3.5)	12 (4.8)	17 (6.5)	15 (5.8)	13 (5)	6.4 (2.5)	5.8 (2.3)	8.4 (3.3)	120 (47)
Source: Weatherbase
