= Mary del Priore =

Brazilian historian and teacher

Mary Lucy Murray Del Priore
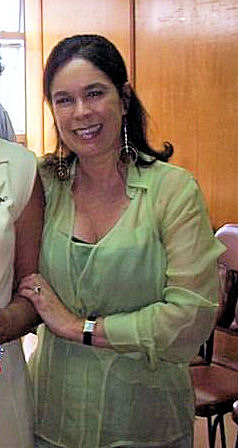
- Mary Del Priore
- Born: 1952 (age 73–74); Rio de Janeiro
- Occupations: historian, professor, writer
- Employer: Federal University of Rio de Janeiro
- Title: Mary Del Priore
- Website: marydelpriore.com.br

Mary Lucy Murray Del Priore (Rio de Janeiro, 1952) is a Brazilian historian and teacher. She wrote several books on the history of everyday Brazilian people during the colonial, imperial and Republican periods.

== Career ==
Mary Del Priore completed her doctorate in Social History at the University of São Paulo and her postdoctoral degree at the Ecole des Hautes Etudes en Sciences Sociales, France. She taught History in several Brazilian universities, such as the University of São Paulo, the Pontifical Catholic University of Rio de Janeiro, and Universidade Salgado de Oliveira. She collaborates with national and international journals, scientific or not .

Del Priore wrote, organized or collaborated in several publications, winning titles such as the Casa Grande & Senzala Prize, awarded by the Joaquim Nabuco Foundation and the Jabuti Prize.

== Awards ==
- Prêmio Fundação Biblioteca Nacional 2009 for the book Condessa de Barral;
- Prêmio APCA 2008 for the book O Príncipe Maldito;
- Prêmio Themis CCJF (2004);
- Prêmio Casa Grande e Senzala (2000);
- Prêmio Personalidade Cultural do Ano (1998);
- Prêmio Casa Grande e Senzala (1998);
- Prêmio Manoel Bonfim (1998);
- Prêmio da União Brasileira de Escritores (1998);
- Prêmio Jabuti (1998) em duas categorias;
- Prêmio do Ministério dos Negócios Estrangeiros do Governo da França e da Organização dos Estados Americanos (1992);

== Books published ==
Some books published by the author:

- Histórias da Gente Brasileira, Vol. 4: República – Memórias (1951–2000), Editora LeYa, 2018.
- Histórias da Gente Brasileira, Vol. 3: República – Memórias (1889–1950), Editora LeYa, 2017.
- Histórias da Gente Brasileira, Vol. 2: Império, Editora LeYa, 2016.
- Histórias da Gente Brasileira, Vol. 1: Colônia, Editora LeYa, 2016.
- Beije-me onde o Sol não alcança, Editora Planeta do Brasil, 2015.
- Do Outro Lado – A História do Sobrenatural e do Espiritismo, Editora Planeta do Brasil, 2014.
- O Castelo de Papel. Rio de Janeiro: Editora Rocco, 2013.
- A Carne e o Sangue. A Imperatriz D. Leopoldina, D. Pedro I e Domitila, a Marquesa de Santos. Rio de Janeiro: Editora Rocco, 2012.
- Histórias Íntimas. Sexualidade e Erotismo na História do Brasil. São Paulo: Editora Planeta, 2011.
- Matar para não morrer. A morte de Euclides da Cunha e a noite sem fim de Dilermando de Assis. Rio de Janeiro: Objetiva, 2009.
- Condessa de Barral, a paixão do Imperador. Rio de Janeiro: Objetiva, 2008.
- O príncipe maldito. Rio de Janeiro: Objetiva, 2007.
- História do Amor no Brasil. São Paulo: Contexto, 2005.
- História das mulheres no Brasil. São Paulo: Contexto, 1997.
- Festas e utopias no Brasil colonial. São Paulo: Brasiliense, 1994.
- História da Criança no Brasil. São Paulo: Contexto, 1991.
