= Noah Hood =

American jurist

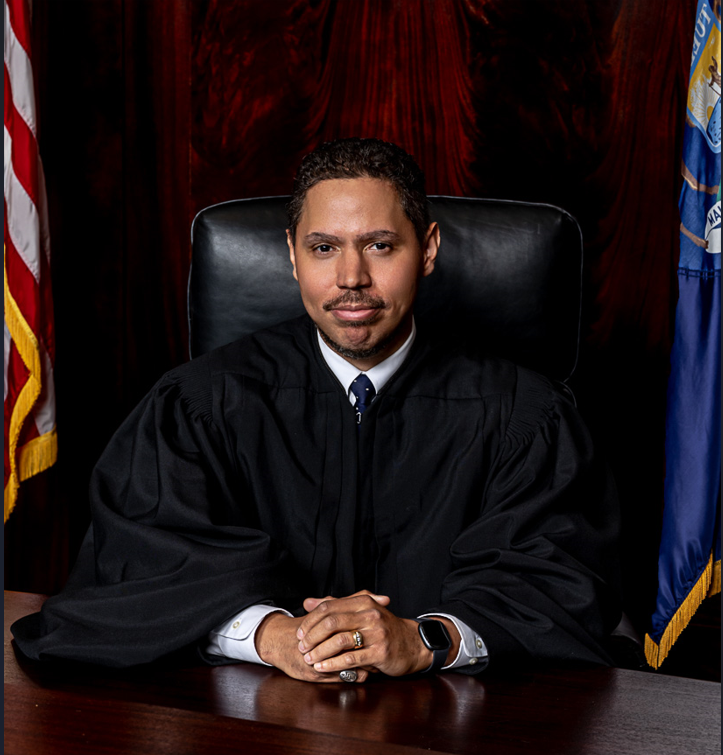

Justice of the Michigan Supreme Court
- Incumbent
- Assumed office May 27, 2025
- Appointed by: Gretchen Whitmer
- Preceded by: Elizabeth T. Clement

Judge of the Michigan Court of Appeals for the 1st district
- In office March 7, 2022 – May 20, 2025
- Appointed by: Gretchen Whitmer
- Preceded by: Karen Fort Hood
- Succeeded by: Mariam Bazzi

Personal details
- Born: 1986 (age 39–40) Detroit, Michigan, U.S.
- Party: Democratic
- Relatives: Denise Page Hood (mother); Nicholas Hood (grandfather)
- Education: Yale University (BA); Harvard University (JD)

Noah P. Hood (born 1986) is an American lawyer and jurist who has served as a justice of the Michigan Supreme Court since 2025. He previously served as a judge of the Michigan Court of Appeals after being appointed by Governor Gretchen Whitmer on February 3, 2022. Hood assumed office the following month and retained his seat in a special election later that year. Hood previously served as a judge on the Third Judicial Circuit of Michigan from 2019 to 2022 and as an assistant United States attorney from 2014 to 2019.

In April 2025, Hood was nominated by Whitmer to fill a vacant seat on the Michigan Supreme Court, this time succeeding former chief justice Elizabeth Clement. Hood took office the following month.

== Early life and education ==
Hood was born in Detroit, Michigan to parents who were both public servants. His father, Rev. Nicholas Hood, III, served on the Detroit City Council and is senior minister of Plymouth United Church of Christ. His mother, Judge Denise Page Hood, is a senior United States district judge on the United States District Court of the Eastern District of Michigan. His paternal grandfather was civil rights activist Rev. Nicholas Hood, Sr., a founding member of the Southern Christian Leadership Conference and the second African American to serve on the Detroit City Council.

Hood attended Detroit Public Schools and graduated from Cass Technical High School. He received his Bachelor of Arts in anthropology from Yale University in 2008. At Yale, Hood was active with the Black Student Alliance at Yale and the Afro-American Cultural Center and a member of the Skull and Bones senior society. He received his Juris Doctor from Harvard Law School in 2011.

== Career ==
From 2011 to 2014, Hood worked as a litigation associate at the Detroit office of Miller, Canfield, Paddock & Stone. During that time, Michigan Community Resources recognized him for pro bono work on nuisance abatement in Detroit.

Hood served as an assistant United States attorney for the Northern District of Ohio from 2014 to 2018 and Eastern District of Michigan from 2018 to 2019. In 2018, he received the United States Treasury FinCEN Director’s law enforcement award for effective use of Bank Secrecy Act data in safeguarding the financial system. He also received a certificate of appreciation from the Director of the United States Secret Service for his contributions to the service’s law enforcement responsibilities.

In March 2019, Hood was appointed to a vacancy on the Third Judicial Circuit of Michigan. He assumed office in May 2019 and was elected to retain his seat in a special election on November 3, 2020. From 2019 to 2022, Judge Hood was assigned to a trial docket in the Criminal Division, where he presided over felony cases arising in Wayne County. From 2021 to 2022, Judge Hood also presided over the Veterans Treatment Court, a specialty court docket that supervised high-need probationers that previously served in the United States military. He previously presided over the Swift and Sure Sanctions Probation Program, a specialty court docket that supervised high-risk probationers.

In February 2022, Governor Whitmer announced her decision to appoint Judge Hood to a vacancy on the Michigan Court of Appeals' First District. Hood was sworn in on March 7, 2022. Hood ran in a special election on November 8, 2022 to complete the partial term ending on January 1, 2027. During his tenure, Hood has participated in several high-profile cases including election law challenges to Perry Johnson's candidacy for Governor in 2022 and Cornel West's candidacy for president in 2024.

In August 2026, Hood was nominated by the Michigan Democratic Party for election to the state's Supreme Court, where he would be serving his first full term if elected.

== Personal life ==
Hood is married. He, his wife, and their son live in Detroit. He is a deacon at Plymouth United Church of Christ.

Hood is a member of the Wolverine Bar Association, the Detroit Metropolitan Bar Association, and the Association of Black Judges of Michigan.

== Electoral history ==
2022 Michigan Court of Appeals special general election, 1st district (partial term)
Party	Candidate	Votes	%
Nonpartisan	Noah Hood (incumbent)	522,016	100%
Total votes		522,016	100.0%
Democratic hold			

Legal offices
Preceded by Elizabeth T. Clement	Justice of the Michigan Supreme Court; 2025–present	Incumbent
