= 1990 Michigan elections =

- November 6, 1990

The 1990 Michigan elections were held in the U.S. state of Michigan on November 6, 1990. The state primary was held on August 7.

== Federal ==
=== U.S. Senate ===
Incumbent Democratic U.S. senator Carl Levin defeated Republican nominee Bill Schuette.

=== U.S. House of Representatives ===
Michigan's U.S. House delegation maintained its 11–7 Democratic majority.

== Executive ==
=== Governor and lieutenant governor ===
Incumbent Democratic governor James J. Blanchard was defeated by Republican nominee John Engler.

=== Secretary of state ===
Incumbent Democratic secretary of state Richard H. Austin defeated Republican nominee Judy Miller.

=== Attorney general ===
Incumbent Democratic attorney general Frank J. Kelley defeated Republican nominee Clifford Taylor.

== Legislature ==
=== Senate ===
The Republicans maintained their 20–18 majority over the Democrats in the chamber.

=== House of Representatives ===
The Democrats won another 61–49 majority over the Republicans in the chamber.

=== House of Representatives special election ===
There was a special election in the 25th state House district. The special primary was held on December 12, 1989. The special general was held on January 16, 1990. It was triggered when incumbent Democrat Dennis Dutko resigned on October 2, 1989, after being sentenced for two drunk driving convictions on March 24, 1989. The special general election was won by Republican D. Roman Kulchitsky.

== Judiciary ==
=== Supreme Court ===
There were two Michigan Supreme Court justices to elect on November 6, 1990. Incumbent Democratic justices Patricia Boyle and Michael Cavanagh won re-election. This maintained the previous make-up of the court, consisting of 3 Democrats, 3 Republicans, and 1 independents.

== Michigan State Board of Education and University Boards ==
=== Michigan State Board of Education ===
Incumbent Democrats Barbara Roberts-Mason and the appointed Rollie Hopgood ran for re-election. Roberts-Mason was re-elected but Hopgood lost to Republican Dick DeVos. This resulted in a 5–3 Republican majority on the board.

=== Michigan State University Board of Trustees ===
Incumbent Democrat Larry Owen sought re-election, while incumbent Democrat Malcolm Dade decided not to. The election was won by Republcians Dee Cook and Jack Shingleton. This resulted in a 5–3 Republican majority on the board.

=== University of Michigan Board of Regents ===
Incumbent Democrat Philip Power sought re-election, while incumbent Democrat Thomas Roach decided not to. Power and Republican Shirley McFee won. This resulted in an even 4–4 split of Democrats and Republicans on the board.

=== Wayne State University Board of Governors ===
Incumbent Democrats Michael Einheuser and Mildred Jeffrey did not run for re-election. Democrat Brenda M. Scott and Republican Elizabeth Hardy won.
