= Gary Brown =

Gary Brown may refer to:

== Sports ==
- Gary Brown (running back) (1969–2022), American football running back and coach
- Gary Brown (offensive lineman) (born 1971), American football player
- Gary Brown (rugby union) (born 1980), Irish rugby player
- Gary Brown (footballer) (born 1985), former Rochdale footballer
- Gary Brown (baseball) (born 1988), American baseball outfielder
- Gary Brown (cricketer) (born 1965), former English cricketer

== Other ==
- Gary Brown (Michigan politician) (born 1953), politician from Detroit, Michigan
- Gary Brown (Wyoming politician)
- Gary Brown (musician), American bass player, see Speak No Evil and Motéma Music
- Gary R. Brown (born 1963), United States District Judge for the Eastern District of New York
- Gary D. Brown, lawyer, whistleblower, former deputy to Harvey Rishikof, when he was the Guantanamo military commission, convening authority
- Gary Hugh Brown (born 1941), American artist

== See also ==
- Gary Browne (disambiguation)
- Garry Brown (disambiguation)
