= Plymouth Educational Center =

School in Detroit, Michigan, United States

Coordinates: 42.36°N 83.0475°W

Plymouth Educational Center was a public K-8 charter school, located in the Vivian H. Ross Campus at 1460 E Forest Ave in Detroit, Michigan 48207. It was formerly K-12.

== History ==
Nicholas Hood, Sr., who had operated the Plymouth United Church of Christ Day Care Center, established a day school division in 1974. Nicholas Hood, III took control of the school in 1984. The Plymouth Day School was incorporated as a private school in 1985. The school moved to a new location in 1990, and it began to cover grades K-5. The school moved back to the church facility in 1991, occupying the lower level. It only covered grades K-2. The school began steps to become a charter school in 1992. On August 31, 1995, it was designated as a Michigan Chartered Public School Academy. The current facility opened in 1999; at the time it covered grades K-8 and had over 700 students.

Its final semester was the spring semester of 2024. Its last official event was a Farewell & Fun Day held on 28 June 2024.

== See also ==
- List of public school academy districts in Michigan
