= Turnipseed =

Turnipseed is a surname. Notable people with the surname include:

- Erica Simone Turnipseed (born 1971), American author
- Tom Turnipseed (1936–2020), American politician and activist

== Fictional people ==
- Harold and Martha Turnipseed, characters in the video game Destroy All Humans!
- Adrian Turnipseed, a character in the Unseen University in books by Terry Pratchett

== See also ==
- Donald Turnupseed, driver involved in the death of James Dean
