= Charles Pugh =

American politician

Member of the Detroit City Council
- In office January 1, 2010 – September 13, 2013

President of the Detroit City Council
- In office January 1, 2010 – July 7, 2013
- Preceded by: Kenneth Cockrel Jr.
- Succeeded by: Saunteel Jenkins

Personal details
- Education: University of Missouri

Charles Pugh (born August 3, 1971) is an American former television journalist, radio personality, and politician from Detroit, Michigan. For ten years, he served as the weekend anchor at WJBK in Detroit. He also served as the radio personality on CoCo, Foolish and Mr. Chase in the Morning and his own talk show, That's What's Up, which both originally aired Sunday evenings on WJLB.

In 2009, Pugh was elected council president of Detroit City Council, becoming the city's first openly LGBT elected official. Pugh served as president from 2010 until resigning in 2013 and relocating to New York City.

In 2016, he was convicted of three counts of criminal sexual misconduct and sentenced to 5 1/2 – 15 years in prison. On December 22, 2021 he was released from Bellamy Creek Correctional Facility in Ionia, Michigan to serve a two-year term of parole. He will have to comply with sex offender registration for the rest of his life.

== Early life, career and entry into politics ==
Pugh was born in Detroit to George and Marcia Pugh. His parents divorced when he was a toddler. At the age of three his mother was murdered by a drug dealer in their home in the San Juan neighborhood of Detroit, and in 1978 his father committed suicide. At the age of nine he moved in with his grandmother. Pugh graduated from Murray-Wright High School in 1989 and attended the University of Missouri in Columbia, Missouri on a $24,000 ($48,500 adjusted for inflation) scholarship from Ford Motor Company.

After graduating in 1993, Pugh started as an anchor on WIBW in Topeka, Kansas, later moving to WISE in Fort Wayne, Indiana, and news stations in Columbia, Missouri, and Norfolk, Virginia. In 1999 Pugh, joined WJBK the FOX affiliate in Detroit.

Pugh resigned from the station in March 2009 to campaign for Detroit City Council. He won the most votes of any council candidate on election day, giving him the title of council president, despite a controversy late in the campaign when he acknowledged that he had been struggling financially and his home had been foreclosed.

In 2012, Pugh sold his home, a condo on 73 Adelaide Street in Midtown Detroit, in a short sale to Shamrock Acquisitions LLC for $106,000. Pugh had purchased the home for $385,000 in 2005.

In 2012, Pugh made headlines in what local newspapers termed a "Twitter war" with an intern at Automotive News. After a brief disagreement on the social network, Pugh tweeted Automotive News requesting that they speak with the intern about his "offensive" posts. Pugh's action was widely derided.

In June 2013, City Councilman Ken Cockrel Jr., who had served as mayor and president of the council, made note of Pugh's recent attendance problems, noting that the then-council president had missed four meetings in a row. At the end of that meeting, Gary Brown, who was the council's president pro tempore and presided over the council in Pugh's absence, told his colleagues that Pugh had requested a four-week leave of absence as "sick leave". Later that day, Emergency Manager Kevyn Orr denied Pugh's request and told him to return to work or resign.

On June 27, 2013, Detroit emergency financial manager Kevyn Orr formally stripped Pugh of his responsibilities and pay as president of Detroit City Council.

Pugh formally resigned from the Detroit City Council in September 2013. He now works at the Pizza Cat in Westland, MI.

== Sex abuse allegations ==
On June 26, 2013, Pugh made headlines again when it was alleged that while serving as president of Detroit City Council he had an inappropriate relationship with a male high school student, aged 17 or 18, whom he mentored. Family spokesman Skip Mongo told reporters Pugh "was in a position of authority and he tried to seduce this young man." News broke of the allegations, and Pugh allegedly left Detroit in the middle of the night, and went into hiding requesting a four-week medical leave, which was denied.

On June 29, 2013, a police report was filed claiming a teenager was being groomed by Pugh. Though at first saying that he could not disclose whether sexual activity took place, the family's lawyer later stated no physical contact happened. The teen's mother complained of being accused of trying to extract a cash payment from Pugh after legal experts questioned why she contacted her lawyers before police. Pugh's supporters, including colleagues and adolescent students he mentored, said the allegations did not match his behavior in or out of class.

In December 2013, Oakland County Prosecutor Jessica Cooper announced she would not file charges against Pugh as there was no evidence that he had engaged in any wrongdoing. "We didn't even have enough probable cause to issue subpoenas", she said. "You have to remember this young man was 18."

The victim filed a civil lawsuit in the United States District Court for the Eastern District of Michigan, asking for $1.5 million in damages. On November 9, 2015, the jury found for Pugh's accuser, awarding him $250,000. In January 2016, when Pugh's accuser attempted to recover the judgment by garnishing Pugh's wages, it was revealed that Pugh never "ran" two restaurants in New York City as he had stated in a deposition, and was just a waiter at soul food restaurant in Harlem. Pugh dropped his appeal after entering mediation with his accuser and agreed to a payment plan in April 2016.

On June 22, 2016, Pugh was formally charged by the Wayne County prosecutor's office and a warrant was issued for his arrest on six counts of criminal sexual conduct (CSC), three each of first and third degree, for an incident in September 2003. A conviction of first degree criminal sexual conduct in Michigan is punishable by up to life in prison, while a conviction of third degree CSC in punishable by a maximum of 15 years in prison. He was formally taken into custody on June 23, 2016, through coordination with the Detroit Police Department and the United States Marshals Service in Harlem, New York, to await extradition to Michigan and arraignment. Pugh was formally arraigned in front of Wayne County District Court Magistrate Millicent Sherman, who entered a not guilty plea on his behalf. Sherman ordered Pugh held on $500,000 bond and remanded him to the Wayne County Jail. On August 5, 2016, Wayne County District Court Judge Deborah Langston bound Pugh over for trial on five of the six felony counts, while dismissing one count of third degree CSC. She reduced Pugh's bond to $150,000 cash.

On October 26, 2016, Pugh pleaded guilty in Wayne County Circuit Court before Judge Thomas Cameron. Pugh's plea agreement called for him to agree to plead guilty to two counts of third degree CSC, while prosecutors dropped three counts on first degree CSC. His deal calls for him to serve between 5 1/2 and 15 years in prison and register as a sex offender for life. In the hearing, Pugh admitted to having sex with the victim at least twice in 2003 and 2004, when the victim was between 13 and 15. Cameron formally sentenced Pugh to 5 1/2 to 15 years in prison on November 9, 2016. In August 2021, Pugh was granted parole by the Michigan Department of Corrections and is expected to be released around December 22, 2021, which is his earliest release date.
