= Peter Whigham =

English poet

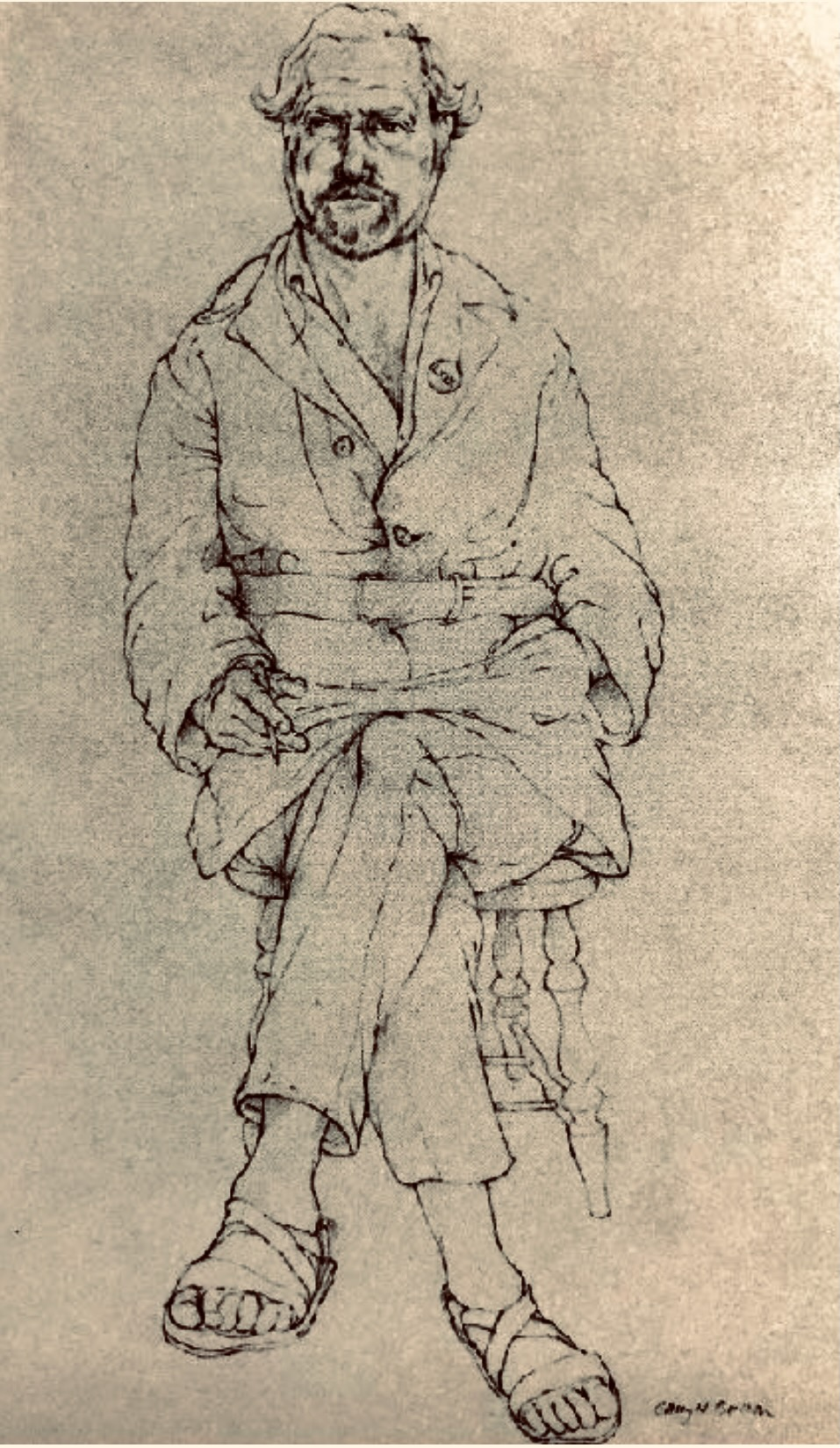
- Peter Whigham, charcoal drawing by Gary H. Brown (1969)
- Born: Peter George Whigham; 6 March 1925; Oxford, England
- Died: 6 August 1987 (aged 62); Santa Barbara, California, US
- Occupation: Poet
- Spouse: Margaret Whigham

Peter George Whigham (6 March 1925 – 6 August 1987) was an English poet and translator, widely known for his translation of the poems of Catullus published by Penguin Books in 1966. He helped popularize the writings of authors like Ezra Pound, George Santayana, and William Carlos Williams.

== Early life ==
Whigham was born on 6 March 1925 in Oxford, England, where he was largely self-educated. His parents were Robert George Murray Whigham (1903-1941) and Ellen Rose Carr (1903-1988).

== Career ==
He worked as a gardener, a school teacher, an actor, a newspaper reporter, and a script writer. He was the grandson of General Sir Robert Whigham (1865-1950). In the 1950s, he contributed to The European, a magazine edited by Diana Mosley. In the early 1960s he moved to Italy to devote himself entirely to writing.

In 1965 Whigham moved to the United States after working as an actor, broadcaster, and scriptwriter for the British Broadcasting Corp. At the BBC, he coordinated the first features focusing on Pound, Santayana, and Williams. In 1968–69 he was a guest lecturer in poetry at the University of California, Santa Barbara, as were Basil Bunting, Fred Turner, and Kenneth Rexroth. His seminar classes were popular among undergraduates new to the experience of living, modern poetry. In the mid-1980s he taught a graduate poetry seminar in the Comparative Literature Department at the University of California, Berkeley.

The Blue Winged Bee was honored by the Poetry Book Society in 1969 in England. The dust jacket and frontispiece for this book was done by artist and professor Gary Hugh Brown. Whigham's poetry appeared in several poetry anthologies, including 23 Modern Poets, Penguin Book of Love Poems, and Twenty Times in One Place.

== Death ==
Whigham died on 6 August 1987 in Humboldt County, California, of injuries he suffered in a car crash. He was 62 years old. He is buried in Santa Barbara, California.

== Books ==
- Ezra Pound (1955)
- Clear Lake Comes From Enjoyment (1958)
- The Marriage Rite (1959)
- Poems of Catullus (1966)
- The ingathering of Love, Work in Progress, Santa Barbara, (1967)
- The Blue Winged Bee: Love poems of the VIth Dalai Lama, Anvil Press (1969), ISBN 0-900977-02-7
- Spectrum, Volume IX, Number 2 (1967)
- The Crystal Mountain (1970)
- The Poems of Meleager (1976)
- Things Common, Properly: Selected Poems 1942 - 1982, Black Swan Books (1984), ISBN 0-933806-21-3.
