= Senayt Samuel =

Eritrean photographer (born 1969)

- Born: 1969 (age 56–57); Asmara, Ethiopia
- Education: Paier College of Art
- Alma mater: Southern Connecticut State University; University of Westminster
- Occupation: Photographer

Senayt Samuel (born 1969) is a photographer, based in London, England. Her work is informed by her family's deportation from Ethiopia and has been included in exhibitions at the Royal Festival Hall and Tate Britain in London.

== Life and work ==
Samuel was born in Asmara and was raised in Addis Ababa and New Haven, Connecticut. She studied Art History and Fine Arts at Paier College of Art in Hamden, Connecticut, and at Southern Connecticut State University in New Haven. While studying abroad as a teenager, her family were deported from Ethiopia, which is a topic that informs her work as a photographer. She moved to London in 2002, where she gained an MA degree in Photographic Studies from the University of Westminster.

She interned as a photojournalist at the New Haven Register, then worked freelance as a photographer in Connecticut and New York.

Her Id series (2003) comprises portraits taken in front of mirrors.

She has a daughter, born in 2005.

== Exhibitions ==
=== Solo exhibitions ===
- People and Landscape of East Africa (Eritrea, Ethiopia and Kenya), Afro-American Cultural Center at Yale, Yale University, New Haven, Connecticut, June–July 1999.

=== Group exhibitions ===
- Imagine Art After, Tate Britain, London, October 2007 – January 2008. Work by Samuel, 'Muyiwa Osifuye, Addisalem Bizuwork, Estabrak, and Denis Hyka and Violana Murataj.
- Reflections on the Self: Five African Women Photographers, Royal Festival Hall, Southbank Centre, London, March–April 2011; Lancaster Arts at Lancaster University, February–March 2012; The Brindley, November 2012–January 2013. Work by Samuel, Hélène Amouzou, Majida Khattari, Zanele Muholi and Nontsikelelo Veleko. Curated by Christine Eyene.
