= Gary Browne =

Gary Browne may refer to:

- Gary Browne (basketball) (born 1993), Puerto Rican basketball player
- Gary Browne (footballer) (born 1983), Northern Irish footballer

== See also ==
- Gary Brown (disambiguation)
- Garry Brown (disambiguation)
