= Jonathan J. C. Grey =

American judge (born 1982)

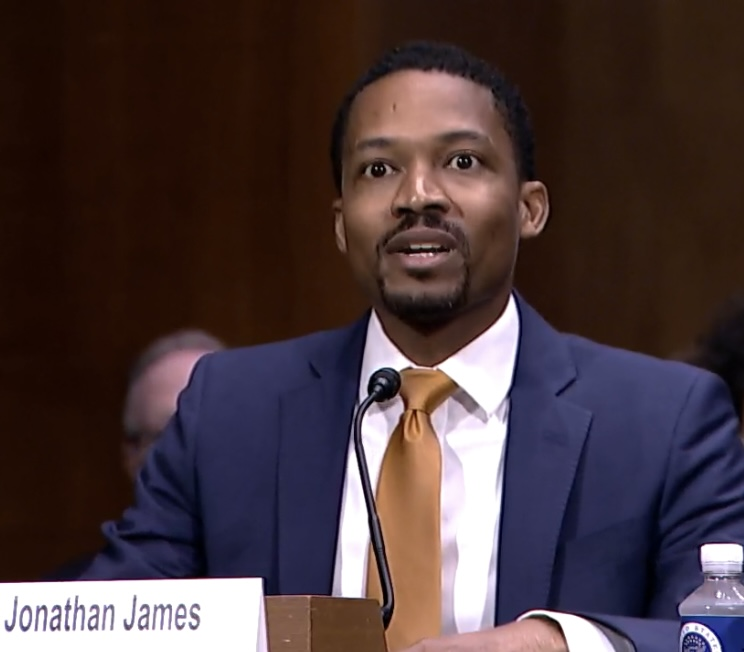

Judge of the United States District Court for the Eastern District of Michigan
- Incumbent
- Assumed office March 9, 2023
- Appointed by: Joe Biden
- Preceded by: Denise Page Hood

Magistrate Judge of the United States District Court for the Eastern District of Michigan
- In office August 24, 2021 – March 9, 2023

Personal details
- Born: Jonathan James Canada Grey; 1982 (age 43–44) Poplarville, Mississippi, U.S.
- Education: Morehouse College (BS); Georgetown University (JD)

Jonathan James Canada Grey (born 1982) is an American lawyer serving as a United States district judge of the United States District Court for the Eastern District of Michigan. He previously served as a magistrate judge of the same court.

== Education ==
Grey earned a Bachelor of Science degree from Morehouse College in 2004 and a Juris Doctor from the Georgetown University Law Center in 2007.

== Career ==
Grey served as a law clerk for Judge Willie Louis Sands of the United States District Court for the Middle District of Georgia from 2009 to 2010 and Judge Damon Keith of the United States Court of Appeals for the Sixth Circuit from 2010 to 2011. From 2011 to 2012 and 2007 to 2009, he was an associate at Seyfarth Shaw. Grey served as an assistant United States attorney for the Eastern District of Michigan from 2012 to 2016 and Southern District of Ohio from 2016 to 2021.

=== Federal judicial service ===
On April 6, 2021, Grey was selected as a United States magistrate judge. He was sworn into office on August 24, 2021.

On September 2, 2022, President Joe Biden announced his intent to nominate Grey to serve as a United States district judge of the United States District Court for the Eastern District of Michigan. On September 6, 2022, his nomination was sent to the Senate. President Biden nominated Grey to the seat vacated by Judge Denise Page Hood, who assumed senior status on May 1, 2022. Grey was unanimously rated "well qualified" for the judgeship by the American Bar Association's Standing Committee on the Federal Judiciary. On November 30, 2022, a hearing on his nomination was held before the Senate Judiciary Committee. On January 3, 2023, his nomination was returned to the President under Rule XXXI, Paragraph 6 of the United States Senate. He was renominated on January 23, 2023. On February 9, 2023, his nomination was reported out of committee by a 13–8 vote. On March 1, 2023, the Senate invoked cloture on his nomination by a 52–44 vote. On March 2, 2023, his nomination was confirmed by a 49–42 vote. He received his judicial commission on March 9, 2023, and was sworn in on the same day.

== See also ==
- List of African-American jurists
- List of African-American federal judges

Legal offices
Preceded by Denise Page Hood	Judge of the United States District Court for the Eastern District of Michigan; 2023–present	Incumbent
