= William P. Bradley =

American lawyer

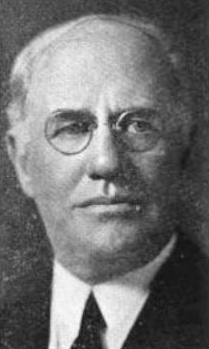
- Born: William Patrick Bradley; December 22, 1867; Williamsport, Pennsylvania
- Died: June 26, 1938 (aged 70); Detroit, Michigan
- Burial place: Mount Olivet Cemetery
- Education: Niagara College
- Occupation(s): Lawyer, politician
- Spouse: Fidelis Ann Fox (m. 1913)
- Children: 3

William Patrick Bradley (December 22, 1867 – June 1938) was a lawyer, who also served in the United States Navy. He served on the City Council of Detroit, Michigan from 1919 to 1938.

== Career ==
William P. Bradley was born in Williamsport, Pennsylvania on December 22, 1867. He attended the local Catholic parish schools and then attended Niagara College in Niagara, New York. Upon graduation, Bradley stayed on at Niagara and studied for his bar exam. He passed and became an attorney in 1891.

He then traveled to Ireland to visit some of his relatives and wrote article for the local Williamsport newspaper. Bradley was paid $5 for each article he wrote, and that enabled him to continue his travels from Ireland to see many countries in Europe. He sent postcards back to his family, and his sister saved them. She later became a Catholic nun.

Upon returning to Williamsport, Bradley decided to travel to Kansas City. There, he enlisted in the Navy.

Bradley served in the Navy for 20 years, and then returned to Williamport to practice law, until his father, Patrick J. Bradley, died in 1915. William and his brother Lewis Jones Bradley moved to Detroit, Michigan. He met Fidelis Ann Fox from Pittsford, Vermont, who was a nurse at Providence Hospital in Detroit, and they were married on November 6, 1913.

Bradley was the Chairman of the Great Lakes Tide Water Commission.

He practiced law in Detroit, and also was part owner of the Ekhardt & Becker Brewing Co. He owned a real estate firm, as well as the Cadilac Moving and Storage Company. He was active in working with the Detroit Red Wings to build the Olympia Hockey Arena in 1926.

Bradley was elected at large as a non-partisan candidate to the Detroit City Council, and served from 1919 until he died in June 1938. On several occasions, he was chairman of the City Council, and was acting mayor in 1924, filling in when the mayor died in office.

William and Fidelis had three sons, William P. Bradley Jr, John Fox Bradley and Dan Fox Bradley. They built a home at 540 East Grand Blvd. in Detroit. East Grand Boulevard was the entranceway to Belle Isle Park, which William helped get built. His name is on the plaque dedicating the Belle Isle Bridge.

William P. Bradley died in Detroit on June 26, 1938, and was buried at Mount Olivet Cemetery.
