= Karen Fort Hood =

American judge (died 2021)

Judge of the Michigan Court of Appeals for the First District
- In office January 1, 2003 – August 15, 2021
- Succeeded by: Noah Hood

Judge of the Wayne County Circuit Court
- In office 1998–2003

Judge of the Recorder's Court
- In office 1992–1998

Personal details
- Born: August 26, 1953 Detroit, Michigan, U.S.
- Died: August 15, 2021 (aged 68)
- Education: Regents College (BA); Detroit College of Law (JD)

Karen Fort Hood (August 26, 1953 – August 15, 2021) was an American judge. She served as a judge of the 1st District of the Michigan Court of Appeals from 2003 to 2021. She received a Bachelor of Arts degree from Regents College of the University of the State of New York at Albany and a Juris Doctor from the Detroit College of Law. She died on August 15, 2021.

== Sources ==
- Court of Appeals bio of Hood
