= Denise Page Hood =

American judge (born 1952)

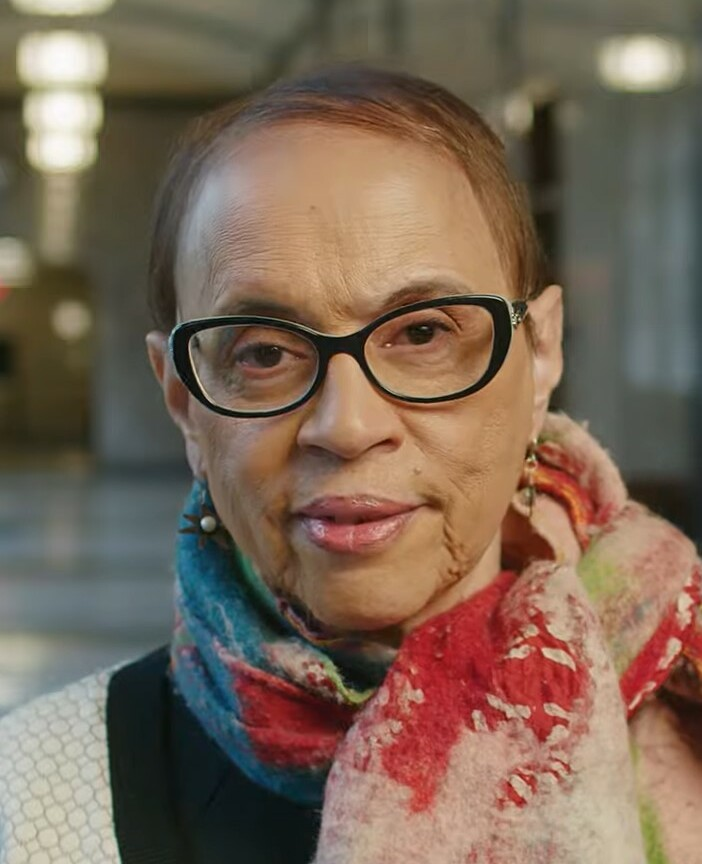
- Hood in 2021

Senior Judge of the United States District Court for the Eastern District of Michigan
- Incumbent
- Assumed office May 1, 2022

Chief Judge of the United States District Court for the Eastern District of Michigan
- In office December 31, 2015 – February 21, 2022
- Preceded by: Gerald Ellis Rosen
- Succeeded by: Sean Cox

Judge of the United States District Court for the Eastern District of Michigan
- In office June 16, 1994 – May 1, 2022
- Appointed by: Bill Clinton
- Preceded by: George E. Woods
- Succeeded by: Jonathan J. C. Grey

Personal details
- Born: Denise Arlene Page; 1952 (age 73–74) Columbus, Ohio, U.S.
- Relatives: Noah Hood (son)
- Education: Yale University (BA); Columbia University (JD)

Denise Arlene Page Hood (born 1952) is a senior United States district judge of the United States District Court for the Eastern District of Michigan.

== Education and career ==
Born in Columbus, Ohio, Hood received a Bachelor of Arts from Yale University in 1974 and a Juris Doctor from Columbia Law School in 1977. She was assistant corporation counsel to the Law Department of the City of Detroit, Michigan, from 1977 to 1982. She then held several state judicial positions, first on the 36th District Court of Michigan from 1983 to 1989, then on the Recorder's Court of the City of Detroit from 1989 to 1992, and lastly on the Michigan Circuit Court for Wayne County, Michigan, from 1993 to 1994.

== Federal judicial service ==
On March 9, 1994, Hood was nominated by President Bill Clinton to a seat on the United States District Court for the Eastern District of Michigan vacated by George E. Woods. She was confirmed by the United States Senate on June 15, 1994, and received her commission on June 16, 1994. She became Chief Judge on December 31, 2015. and served in that role until February 15, 2022. She assumed senior status on May 1, 2022.

== Personal life ==
Page Hood is married to Rev. Nicholas Hood III, current pastor at the Plymouth United Church of Christ in Detroit and a former member of the Detroit City Council. The two have a son, Noah Hood, who currently serves on the Michigan Supreme Court.

== See also ==
- List of African-American federal judges
- List of African-American jurists

Legal offices
Preceded by George E. Woods	Judge of the United States District Court for the Eastern District of Michigan; 1994–2022	Succeeded by Jonathan J. C. Grey
Preceded by Gerald Ellis Rosen	Chief Judge of the United States District Court for the Eastern District of Michigan; 2015–2022	Succeeded by Sean Cox
