= Kay Everett =

American politician

Member of the Detroit City Council
- In office 1991–2004

Personal details
- Born: 1941 Detroit, Michigan, U.S.
- Died: November 25, 2004 (aged 62–63) Detroit, Michigan, U.S.
- Occupation: Politician, educator

Kay Everett (1941 – 2004) was a member of Detroit City Council from 1991 to 2004.

== Education and career ==
Everett was a graduate of Cass Technical High School, and Wayne State University. She was on the Detroit Board of Education prior to becoming a Detroit City Council member. Prior to that she was an English teacher for Detroit Public Schools.

Everett was a native Detroiter who grew up on the east side of the city.

== Allegations of corruption ==
On November 1, 2004, Everett was indicted by a Detroit federal grand jury on charges of wire fraud, extortion, bribery, conspiracy to commit those offenses, making false statements to investigators, and filing false tax returns in connection with accepting more than $150,000 from a local contractor between 1997 and 2002. Her case was dismissed.

== Death ==
On Thanksgiving Day 2004, Everett succumbed unexpectedly to kidney disease. Her hats and other memorabilia were donated to both the African American Museum and Detroit Historical Museum.
