= Garry Brown =

Garry Brown may refer to:

- Garry E. Brown (1923–1998), US politician
- Garry Brown (artist), creator of comics such as Black Road
- Garry Brown (athlete) (born 1954), Australian hurdler
- Garry A. Brown (politician), chairman of the New York Public Service Commission (PSC)
- Garry A. Brown (producer), American television producer

== See also ==
- Gary Brown (disambiguation)
- Gary Browne (disambiguation)
