= George E. Woods =

American judge (1923–2007)

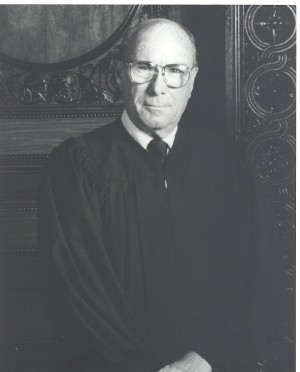

Senior Judge of the United States District Court for the Eastern District of Michigan
- In office November 16, 1993 – August 13, 2004

Judge of the United States District Court for the Eastern District of Michigan
- In office November 16, 1983 – November 16, 1993
- Appointed by: Ronald Reagan
- Preceded by: Patricia Boyle
- Succeeded by: Denise Page Hood

Personal details
- Born: George E. Woods; October 10, 1923 Cleveland, Ohio
- Died: October 9, 2007 (aged 83) Waterford, Michigan
- Education: Detroit College of Law (J.D.)

George E. Woods (October 10, 1923 – October 9, 2007) was a United States district judge of the United States District Court for the Eastern District of Michigan.

== Education and career ==
Born in Cleveland, Ohio, Woods was in the United States Army during World War II, from 1943 to 1946. He received a Juris Doctor from Detroit College of Law (now Michigan State University College of Law) in 1949. He was in private practice in Pontiac, Michigan from 1949 to 1951. He was an assistant prosecuting attorney of Oakland County, Michigan from 1951 to 1952. He was in private practice in Pontiac in 1953. He was the Chief Assistant United States Attorney of the Eastern District of Michigan from 1953 to 1960. He was the United States Attorney for the Eastern District of Michigan from 1960 to 1961. He was in private practice in Detroit, Michigan from 1961 to 1981. He was the chief special prosecutor for the Wayne County Grand Jury from 1965 to 1966.

== Federal judicial service ==
Woods served as a United States Bankruptcy Judge for the Eastern District of Michigan from 1981 to 1983. Woods was nominated by President Ronald Reagan on November 1, 1983, to a seat on the United States District Court for the Eastern District of Michigan vacated by Judge Patricia Boyle. He was confirmed by the United States Senate on November 15, 1983, and received his commission on November 16, 1983. He assumed senior status on November 16, 1993. Woods served in that capacity until his retirement on August 13, 2004.

== Death ==
Woods died in Waterford, Michigan on October 9, 2007.

== Sources ==
Legal offices
Preceded by Patricia Boyle	Judge of the United States District Court for the Eastern District of Michigan; 1983–1993	Succeeded by Denise Page Hood
