= Erica Simone Turnipseed =

American novelist

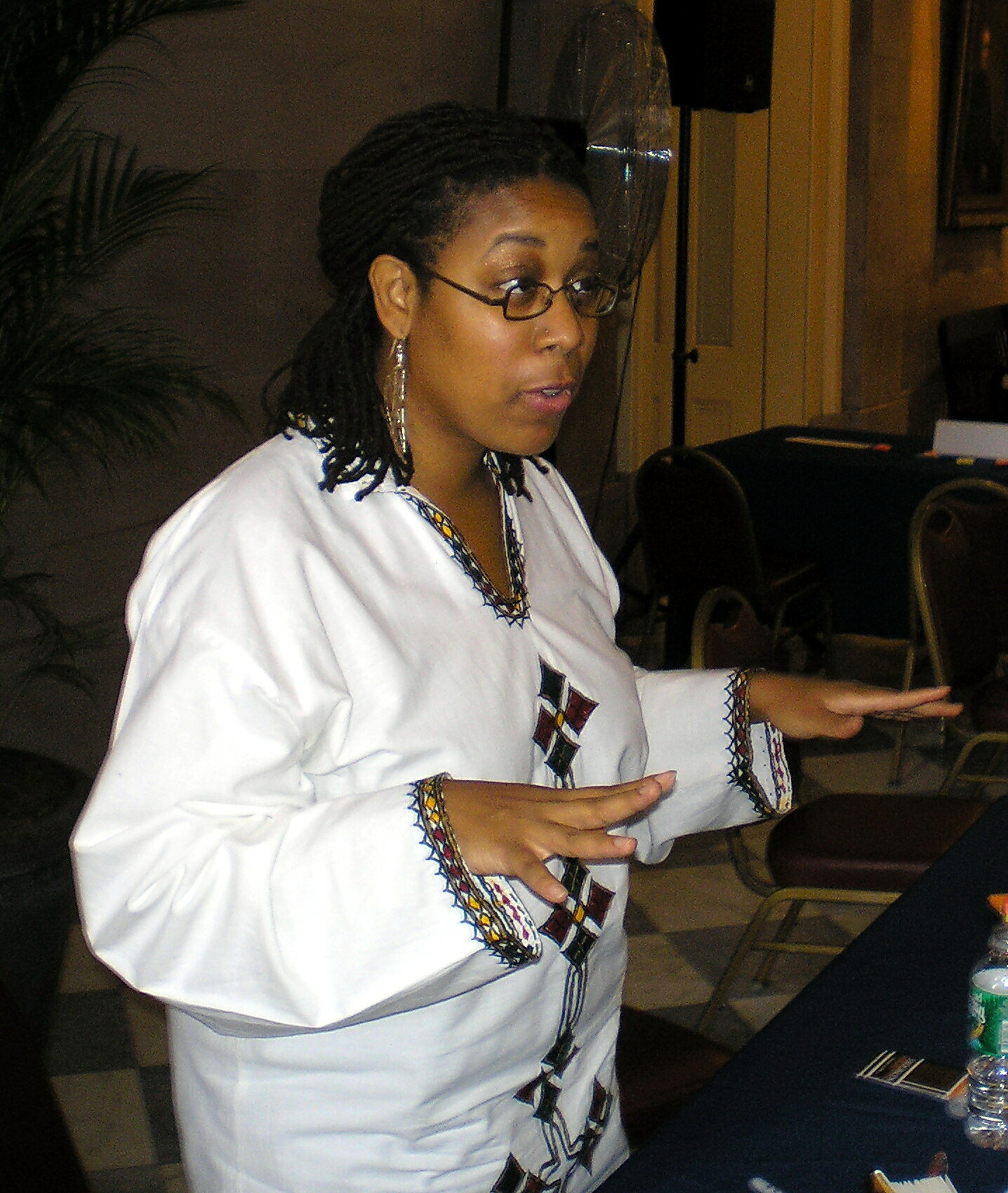
- Born: June 12, 1971 (age 55)
- Education: Yale University (BA); Columbia University (MA)
- Occupation: Novelist

Erica Simone Turnipseed (born June 12, 1971) is an African American novelist.

== Education ==
Turnipseed earned her B.A. and M.A degrees in anthropology from Yale University and Columbia University respectively.

== Career ==
Her debut novel A Love Noire won the Atlanta Choice Award Author of the Year from the Atlanta Daily World. She published her second novel Hunger in 2006. Complementing Turnipseed's first two novels is A Love Noire/Hunger: The Soundtrack.

In addition, Turnipseed was nominated for Breakout Author of the Year for the African American Literary Awards Show Open Book Award.

Among her many appearances, Turnipseed has served as a guest lecturer at Spelman College, Medgar Evers College, Baruch College, Midwood High School, and Yale University. She was a panelist at the inaugural Brooklyn Book Festival, the Brooklyn Best Festival, and the Up South International Book Festival.

She is also the founder of the "Five Years for the House Initiative," a fund raising drive for the Afro-American Cultural Center at Yale.

She lives with her husband in Brooklyn, New York.
