= Nicholas Hood =

American politician

- Born: June 21, 1923; Terre Haute, Indiana
- Died: April 10, 2016 (aged 92); Detroit, Michigan, U.S.
- Occupations: Minister, civil rights activist, and politician

Nicholas Hood Sr. (June 21, 1923 – April 10, 2016) was an American minister, civil rights activist, and politician. He served six terms as a member of the Detroit City Council.

== Early life and career ==
Nicholas Hood Sr. was born in Terre Haute, Indiana, in 1923, the youngest of eight children born to Orestes and Daisy Eslick Hood. His paternal grandfather was a former slave who managed a brickyard in Martinsville, Indiana. His father was an electrician and a teacher; his mother was a graduate of Fisk University who had been a teacher and social worker.

Hood grew up under Jim Crow segregation in Terre Haute. For grade school, he went to Booker T. Washington School, which served only black students; he did not attend an integrated school until he reached junior high. He then went to Wiley High School, graduating in 1940. As a student in the recently integrated school, it was made clear to him that his presence was unwelcome – an experience Hood later described as "very difficult".

After finishing high school, he had to undergo intensive surgery at the Children's Hospital of Indiana to address a spinal deformity. Inspired by this experience, he decided to become a doctor, and enrolled at Purdue University as a pre-med biology and chemistry major. He began his studies while still recovering from the surgery, and had to wear a steel back brace throughout his freshman year.

Hood's professional goals shifted away from medicine after he became involved with a Methodist student group at Purdue. The group organized student volunteers to work with white churches across northwest Indiana in an attempt to build connections across the divide of racial segregation. They were led by a pair of white ministers that had opened up their home to black students who otherwise could not find housing at the West Lafayette campus; Hood lived in this "international house" the entire time he attended Purdue. With the encouragement of these advisors, Hood decided to pursue a career that blended ministry and civil rights activism. He graduated from Purdue University in 1945 with a Bachelor of Science, then spent a year at North Central College in Naperville, Illinois studying liberal arts in order to balance his science-heavy background. He applied to Yale Divinity School, and completed his master's degree there in 1949.

== Career ==
=== Ministry ===
After finishing divinity school, Hood became the pastor of the Central Congregational Church in New Orleans, Louisiana. In 1957, he joined Martin Luther King Jr.'s Southern Christian Leadership Council as one of its founding members.

In 1958, Hood moved to a position as senior pastor of the Plymouth Congregational Church (now the Plymouth United Church of Christ) in Detroit, Michigan, taking the helm of a congregation with roots going back to 1919. He arrived at a crucial moment in the church's history: the city of Detroit, under mayor Louis Miriani, had announced urban renewal plans to tear down acres of city neighborhoods, including the church building itself, to make way for a new medical center. Rev. Hood Sr. joined other local churches, labor groups, and civil rights organizations to protest this displacement of majority-black communities, launching a movement that would be some of the first substantial resistance to "slum clearance" policies in the United States. In 1961 he formed the Fellowship of Urban Renewal Churches, which anchored a successful opposition to the Miriani administration and helped lead to a historic upset in the 1962 election of Mayor Jerome Cavanagh.

Under Rev. Hood's leadership, Plymouth Congregational Church created an active housing ministry and went on to purchase nearly fifty acres of "urban renewal" land. He insisted on depositing funds for this initiative in a black-owned bank, which helped avoid the rampant discrimination in mortgage lending. A new church was built and plans were made for new housing developments, including accessible options for seniors and people with disabilities. Their efforts came to fruition with the construction of the Nicholas Hood Sr. Medical Center Courts apartments in 1963, and the Medical Center Village Apartments in 1975; these two sites comprised more than 650 units of housing. The new church and the housing complexes were designed by the Cleveland architect Robert P. Madison.

Hood remained the senior pastor at Plymouth Congregational Church until 1985, when he retired and became pastor emeritus.

=== Politics ===
In 1965, Hood was elected to the Detroit City Council. He was the second black council member in the history of that body.

Hood was a political moderate on the city council, and he kept much of his focus on civil rights activism. One notable battle was with the Detroit hospitals, which refused to hire black medical staff members. Hood and a coalition of physicians used anti-discrimination requirements attached to urban-renewal land purchases to block the hospitals from expanding until they agreed to hire black doctors.

As the only black member of the city council during the riot of 1967, Hood found himself in a highly visible position that he has called a "focal point," asked frequently to meet with the governor and mayor for strategy sessions that he later described as "[not] much strategizing, other than to try to keep the troops that they brought in from going berserk."

In 1993, Hood retired from his position on the city council, after serving six terms over 28 years.

== Personal life ==
Nicholas Hood Sr. married Dr. Elizabeth Flemister Hood in 1949. The 42-year marriage ended with her death in 1991.

The couple had three children: Sarah, Stephen, and Nicholas. Stephen Hood has worked as a political consultant and Wayne County official.

Rev. Nicholas Hood III is the current pastor of Plymouth United Church of Christ in Detroit and a former city council member himself, as well as a candidate in the 2001 Detroit mayoral election. Rev. Hood III is married to Denise Page Hood, Chief District Judge of the U.S. District Court for the Eastern District of Michigan. Their son, Noah Hood, is also a judge, currently serving on the Michigan Supreme Court.

Hood remarried on December 4, 1993, to Doris Chenault Hood, a public school administrator.

== Death and legacy ==
Rev. Nicholas Hood Sr. died in Detroit, Michigan in 2016 at the age of 92. Fellow civil rights leader and politician Andrew Young gave the eulogy at his funeral.

Hood was recognized by the city of Detroit later that year with an honorary street naming at St. Antoine and Canfield St., near Plymouth United Church of Christ and in front of one of the housing complexes he fought to build in the 1960s. Speakers at the dedication ceremony included SCLC leader Dr. Charles Steele, City Council president Brenda Jones, and Senator Carl Levin.
