= Brenda M. Scott =

American politician

Member of the Detroit City Council
- In office January 1, 1994 – September 2, 2002

Personal details
- Born: Brenda M. Scott; December 22, 1954 Detroit, Michigan
- Died: September 2, 2002 (aged 47) Detroit, Michigan
- Party: Democratic
- Education: Wayne State University

Brenda M. Scott was a Detroit City Council member from 1994 to 2002.

== Early life ==
Rudy Scott, a manager at General Motors, and Nancy M. Scott, a restaurant and caterer, welcomed Scott into the world on December 22, 1954. She was inspired to enter public service by her mother. Scott held a Bachelor of Arts degree with a dual major in political science and speech communication from Wayne State University. She also earned a Master of Arts in urban politics from the University of Detroit.

== Political career ==
Scott began her career as an administrative assistant to the former Detroit City Council Member, Herbert McFadden, Jr. She later served as both an administrative and executive assistant to the former Detroit City Council Member, Mel Ravitz.

In 1990, Scott was elected a member of the Wayne State University (WSU) board of governors. She held this position from 1991 to 1995. Scott resigned from the board due to a court ruling that precluded her from holding two elected offices as a councilwoman and board of governor. After serving on the board, Scott started the Brenda M. Scott Scholarship Fund. The scholarship was endowed for $10,000 by former Wayne State President David Adamany on behalf of the board of governors. The scholarship is open to all WSU students and is awarded on the basis of scholastic achievement, financial need and demonstrable qualities of leadership. She was a founding member of the Wayne State University Organization of Black Alumni.

Scott was elected to the Detroit City Council in 1993. At the time of her death in 2002, Scott had begun her third term and was the City Council Designee on the City of Detroit General Retirement System Board of Trustees. She was the first African-American woman to serve as a trustee.

While on City Council, Scott chaired several task forces and led numerous initiatives. She chaired the City Council Task Force on Firearm Violence, which created an ordinance to remove illegal firearms from the streets by cracking down on neighborhood gun dealers. She also led the City Council's effort to make sure all Detroiters were counted in the 2000 Census.

Scott sponsored several community service activities throughout the year which included her annual Black History Month Program, Belle Isle Family Fun Day Picnic, Health Fair, Thanksgiving Food Drive and Golf Classic.

Scott was vice chair of the Detroit Entrepreneurial Institute and a member of Alpha Kappa Alpha and Gamma Phi Delta sororities.

== Death ==
Scott died on Labor Day, September 2, 2002, from a severe stomach infection, peritonitis, three days after having stomach-reduction surgery.

== Legacy ==
Detroit Public Schools honored Scott in 2003 by naming a PK-8 school after her, Brenda M. Scott Academy for Theatre Arts.

In April 2017, Helena Scott, Scott's sister-in-law, ran for Detroit City Council in District 2.
