= Third Judicial Circuit of Michigan =

Largest circuit court in Michian

The Third Judicial Circuit of Michigan is the largest circuit court in the state, with 61 judges and three operating divisions as of 2023. The Third Circuit Court has jurisdiction over civil, criminal, and family matters arising in Wayne County. The National Center for State Courts has cited the Third Circuit Court as one of the model urban courts in the United States for case flow management and the timely disposition of the Court's docket.

== Organization ==
The Third Judicial Circuit of Michigan has 3 divisions, with the Family Division having three subsections.

- Civil Division
- Criminal Division
- Family Division
  - Domestic Section
  - Friend of the Court
  - Juvenile section

=== Civil ===
Civil matters involve claims in excess of $25,000; the Civil Divison also handles civil matters appealed from Wayne County district courts and administrative agencies.

Judge	First term start	Current term end	Mandatory retirement
David J. Allen	2003	2026	
Annette J. Berry	2018	2030	
Kevin J. Cox	2013	2030	
Melissa A. Cox	2017	2028	
Paul J. Cusick	2016	2030	
Charlene M. Elder	2006	2026	
Wanda A. Evans	2017	2028	
Patricia P. Fresard	1999	2028	
Sheila Ann Gibson (Note: Current presiding judge.)	1999	2028	
John H. Gillis, Jr.	1997	2026	
Adel A. Harb	2015	2030	
Dana M. Hathaway	2013	2030	
Catherine L. Heise	2014	2030	
Susan L. Hubbard	2011	2028	
Muriel D. Hughes	2006	2028	
Edward J. Joseph	2014	2026	
Qiana Denise Lillard	2013	2030	
Kathleen M. McCarthy	2001	2030	
Martha M. Snow	2015	2028	2032
Brian R. Sullivan	1999	2028	

=== Criminal ===
Judge	First term start	Current term end	Mandatory retirement
Charise Anderson	2023	2028	
Rula Aoun	2026	2028	
Chandra W. Baker-Robinson	2021	2026	
Christopher Blount	2022	2026	
Nicole Castka	2025	2026	
Bradley L. Cobb	2022	2026	
Kiefer Cox	2023	2028	
Prentis Edwards, Jr.	2017	2030	
Robbie Gaines, Jr.	2026	2030	
John C. Gillis	2023	2028	
Tracy E. Green	2019	2030	
Bridget Mary Hathaway	2019	2030	
Nicholas J. Hathaway	2023	2028	
Donald L. Knapp (Note: Current presiding judge.)	2018	2026	
Anne M. McCarthy	2023	2028	
Cylenthia Latoye Miller	2019	2026	
Kelly A. Ramsey	2017	2028	
Mark T. Slavens	2007	2028	
Regina D. Thomas	2019	2030	
Margaret M. Van Houten	2012	2016	
Shannon N. Walker	2015	2026	
Darnella D. Williams-Claybourne	2020	2028	

== Chief Judges ==
Chief Judges	Term
Joseph A. Sullivan	January 1967 - January 1975
James N. Canham	January 1975 - December 1977
Richard Dunn	January 1978 - December 1985
Joseph B. Sullivan	January 1986 - March 1986
W. Leo Cahalan	March 1986 - March 1986
Richard Kaufman	March 1986 - December 1993
James Rashid	January 1994 - September 1997
Michael Sapala	October 1997 - December 2001
Timothy M. Kenny (Co-Chief Judge)	January 2002 - December 2003
Mary Beth Kelly	January 2002 - December 2007
William Giovan	January 2008 - December 2008
Virgil C. Smith	January 2009 - December 2013
Robert J. Colombo, Jr.	January 2014 – December 2018
Timothy M. Kenny	January 2019 – December 2022
Patricia Perez Fresard	January 2023 – December 2025
Edward Ewell, Jr.	January 2026 – present
