= Patricia Boyle =

American judge (1937–2014)

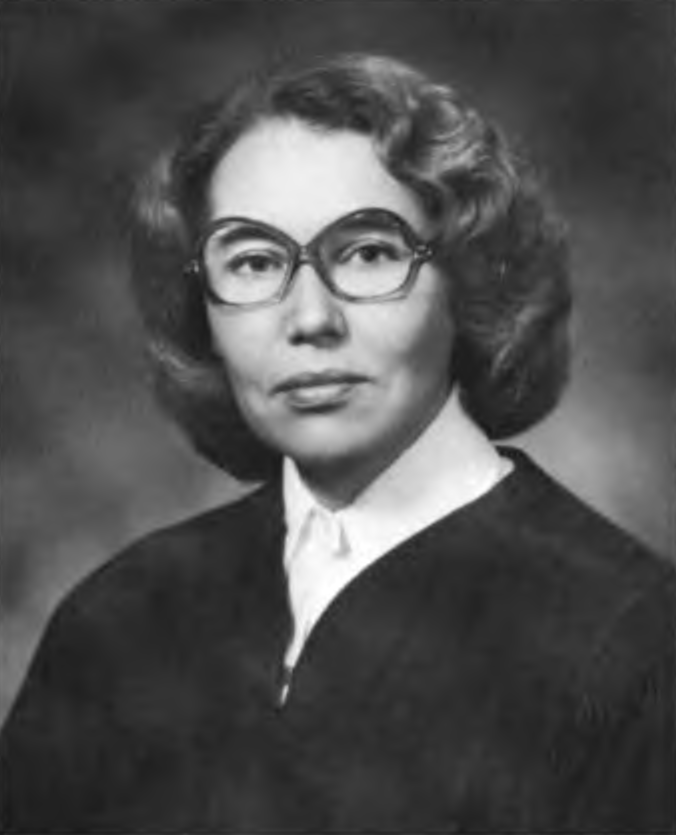

Associate Justice of the Supreme Court of Michigan
- In office April 20, 1983 – January 1, 1999
- Appointed by: James Blanchard
- Preceded by: Dorothy Comstock Riley
- Succeeded by: Maura D. Corrigan

Judge of the United States District Court for the Eastern District of Michigan
- In office September 23, 1978 – April 20, 1983
- Appointed by: Jimmy Carter
- Preceded by: Damon Keith
- Succeeded by: George E. Woods

Personal details
- Born: Patricia Jean Ehrhardt; March 31, 1937 Detroit, Michigan, U.S.
- Died: January 13, 2014 (aged 76) Fort Myers, Florida, U.S.
- Party: Democratic
- Education: Wayne State University (BA, JD)

Patricia Jean Boyle (née Ehrhardt, later Pernick; March 31, 1937 – January 13, 2014) was a United States district judge of the United States District Court for the Eastern District of Michigan from 1978 to 1983 and an associate justice of the Michigan Supreme Court from 1983 to 1999.

== Education and career ==
Born in Detroit, Michigan as Patricia Jean Ehrhardt, Boyle received a Bachelor of Arts degree from Wayne State University and a Juris Doctor from Wayne State University Law School in 1963. She was a law clerk to Kenneth Davies, a Detroit attorney from 1963 to 1964, and to Judge Thaddeus M. Machrowicz of the United States District Court for the Eastern District of Michigan from 1964 to 1965. She was an Assistant United States Attorney for the Eastern District of Michigan in Detroit from 1965 to 1970. She was an assistant prosecuting attorney of Wayne County, Michigan from 1970 to 1976. She was a judge of the Recorder's Court of the City of Detroit from 1976 to 1978.

== Judicial service ==
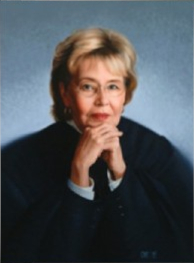
Judicial portrait of Boyle, 2001, by Carl Owens.

On July 25, 1978, Boyle was nominated by President Jimmy Carter to a seat on the United States District Court for the Eastern District of Michigan vacated by Judge Damon Keith. She was confirmed by the United States Senate on September 22, 1978, and received her commission the following day. She resigned on April 20, 1983, to be appointed as an associate justice of the Michigan Supreme Court. She was elected to the Court in 1986, and re-elected to an eight-year term beginning in 1990. Her service on the Michigan Supreme Court ended in 1998.

== Death ==
Boyle died on January 13, 2014, of respiratory failure at the age of 76, in Fort Myers, Florida.

Legal offices
Preceded by Damon Keith	Judge of the United States District Court for the Eastern District of Michigan; 1978–1983	Succeeded by George E. Woods
Preceded by Dorothy Comstock Riley	Associate Justice of the Michigan Supreme Court; 1983–1999	Succeeded by Maura D. Corrigan
