= Detroit City Council =

Legislative body of Detroit, Michigan, U.S.

History
- Founded: 1824 (as the Common Council)

Leadership
- President: James Tate since 2026
- President Pro-Tempore: Coleman Young II since 2026

Structure
- Seats: 7 districts 2 at-large
- Council political groups: Officially nonpartisan: Democratic (9)
- Council committees: Budget and Finance, Neighborhood and Community Services, Human Resources, Law and Public Safety, Planning and Economic Development
- Length of term: 4 years
- Authority: Article 4, Chapter 1, Charter of the City of Detroit, 2012

Elections
- Council voting system: First-past-the-post (district seats); Block voting (at-large seats)
- Last Council election: November 4, 2025

Motto
- Speramus Meliora, Resurget Cineribus (We hope for better things, It will rise from the ashes)

Meeting place
- 13th floor, Coleman A. Young Municipal Building

Website
- Official website

The Detroit City Council is the legislative body of Detroit, Michigan, United States. The full-time council is required to meet every business day for at least 10 months of the year, with at least eight of these meetings occurring at a location besides city hall. The Detroit City Council most recently elected James Tate to be its president. The council may convene for special meetings at the call of the mayor or of at least four members of council.

== History ==
The city council was first constituted as the legislative body of the city in 1824. The city began to grow more rapidly in the late 19th century, absorbing immigrants from Europe and migrants from the rural South and other areas. This body was called the Common Council until July 1, 1974.

Until the early 20th century, the council was elected from city wards, or single-member districts. However, starting in 1918, at a time of changes in local government thought to be Progressive, the city council voted to require all city council members elected at-large. This reduced representation by geography from wards, where various ethnic groups tended to concentrate. It was considered unusual for a city of Detroit's size, which had competing political parties.

While voters in the city have become predominantly affiliated with the Democratic Party, they wanted more representation by district. On November 4, 2009, city voters overwhelmingly approved a referendum to once again elect seven of the nine council seats from single-member districts, and two at-large seats, beginning in 2013.

== Composition ==
The council is composed of nine members, seven of whom are district representatives elected from single-member districts, with two additional members elected at-large using block voting. The district representatives are elected by a majority in a general election, with the general election candidates being selected in a top-two non-partisan primary election. The council includes two officers, the president and president pro tempore, who are elected from among the members of the council at the beginning of each new session of the body for four-year terms. The officers can be removed by a unanimous vote of council, exclusive of the member being removed, during any session meeting. Elections to the body are officially non-partisan.

Detroit City Council Electoral Districts Map

=== Current members ===
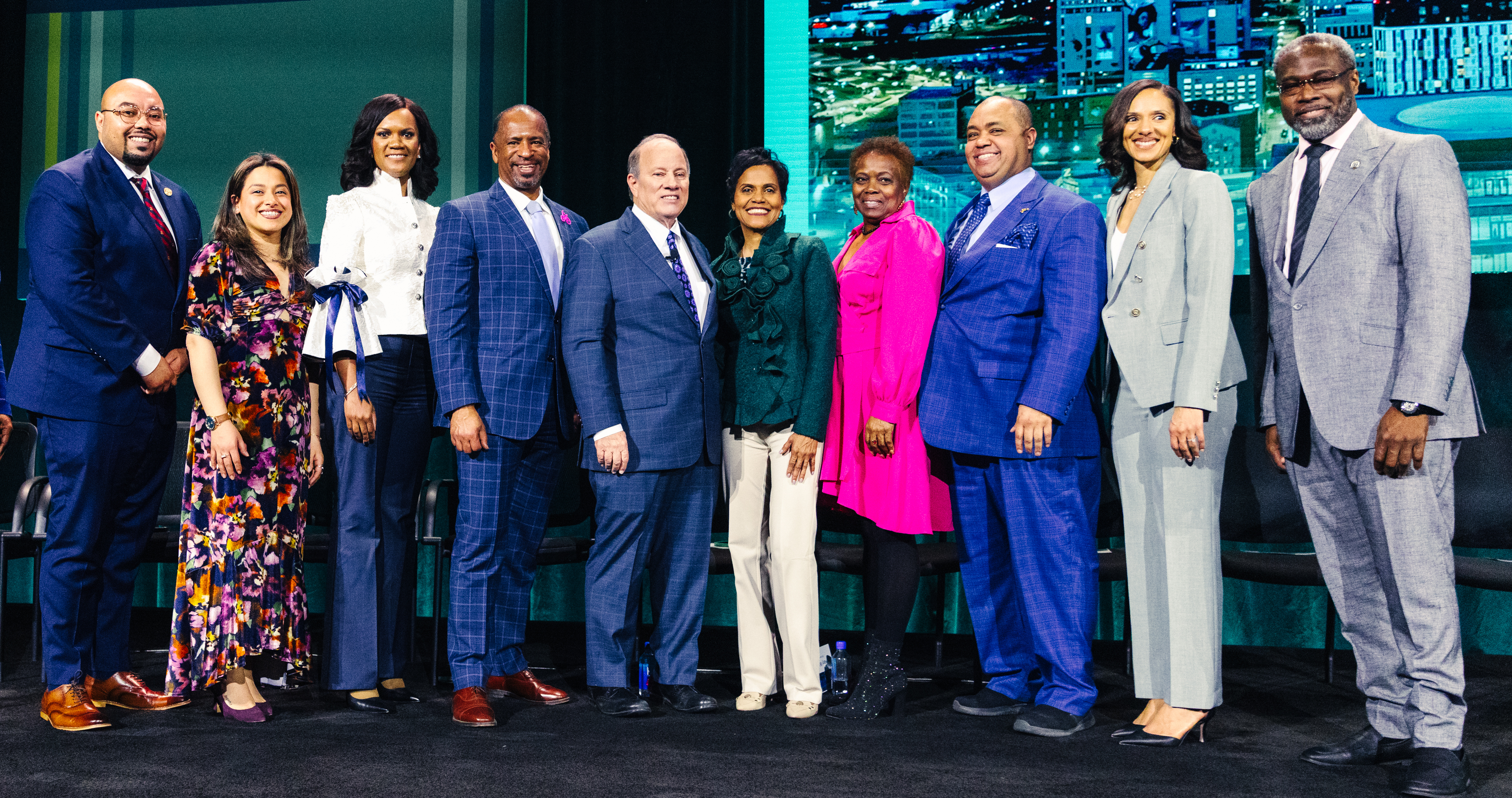
Members of the city council with Mike Duggan in 2025, from left: Durhal II, Santiago-Romero, Johnson, Benson, Duggan, Whitfield-Calloway, Waters, Young III, Sheffield, and Tate.

District	Communities included	Councilor	Position	Since	Party (officially nonpartisan)	Additional affiliation(s)
1	Rosedale Park, Old Redford, Brightmoor	James Tate	President	2010	Democratic	
2	Bagley, University District, Palmer Woods	Angela Whitfield-Calloway	–	2022	Democratic	
3	Conant Gardens, Regent Park, Farwell	Scott Benson	–	2014	Democratic	
4	Chandler Park, East English, Jefferson Chalmers	Latisha Johnson	–	2022	Democratic	
5	Boston Edison, Lafayette Park, Brush Park	Renata Miller	–	2026	Democratic	
6	Delray, Midtown, Mexicantown	Gabriela Santiago-Romero	–	2022	Democratic	DSA
7	Warrendale, Russel Woods, Rouge Park	Denzel Anton McCampbell	–	2026	Democratic	DSA
At-large	–	Coleman Young II	President Pro-Tempore	2022	Democratic	
At-large	–	Mary Waters	–	2022	Democratic	

=== Committees ===
The council has six standing committees:

- Budget, Finance & Audit
- Neighborhood & Community Services
- Internal Operations
- Public Health & Safety
- Planning and Economic Development
- Rules

The council is granted the power to form additional committees at its own discretion

== Vacancies and special elections ==
If a vacancy occurs on the city council, it is filled by appointment of the city council based on a two-thirds vote of its existing members. The appointee serves until an elected member takes office, which is filled at the next general election scheduled in the city not held sooner than 180 days after the vacancy occurs, be that an election to fill federal, state, county or city offices.

== Former members ==
Starting in 1919, nine Detroit City Council members were elected at large. Members of the council, from 1919 to the present, are:

- Color coding: pink = Republican; blue = Democratic; light green = Farmer-Labor; dark green = Progressive; gray = unaffiliated.

Year	Detroit City Council Members								
1919	John C. Lodge	James Vernor	John C. Nagel	Sherman Littlefield	William P. Bradley (Died June 1938)	Charles F. Bielman (Died April 16, 1920)	Fred W. Castator	David W. Simons	John Kronk
	John C. Lodge	James Vernor	John C. Nagel	Sherman Littlefield	William P. Bradley (Died June 1938)	Richard M. Watson (Elected November 21, 1920)	Fred W. Castator	David W. Simons	John Kronk
1922	John C. Lodge	James Vernor	John C. Nagel	Sherman Littlefield	William P. Bradley (Died June 1938)	Richard M. Watson (Elected November 21, 1920)	Fred W. Castator	Robert G. Ewald	John Kronk
1924	John C. Lodge	John Stevenson	John C. Nagel	Sherman Littlefield	William P. Bradley (Died June 1938)	Arthur E. Dingeman	Fred W. Castator	Robert G. Ewald	Phillip A. Callahan
1926	John C. Lodge	John Stevenson	John C. Nagel	Sherman Littlefield	William P. Bradley (Died June 1938)	Arthur E. Dingeman	Fred W. Castator	Robert G. Ewald	Phillip A. Callahan
1928	John C. Lodge	George A. Walters	John Kronk	Sherman Littlefield	William P. Bradley (Died June 1938)	Arthur E. Dingeman	Fred W. Castator	Robert G. Ewald	Phillip A. Callahan
1930	John C. Nagel	George A. Walters	John Kronk	John S. Hall (Died January 19, 1934)	William P. Bradley (Died June 1938)	Arthur E. Dingeman	Fred W. Castator	Robert G. Ewald	Phillip A. Callahan
1932	Frank Couzens	John W. Smith	Richard Lindsay (Died January 7, 1937)	John S. Hall (Died January 19, 1934)	William P. Bradley (Died June 1938)	John C. Lodge	Fred W. Castator	Eugene Van Antwerp	Edward Jeffries
1934	George Engle (Until June 23, 1937)	John W. Smith	Richard Lindsay (Died January 7, 1937)	John S. Hall (Died January 19, 1934)	William P. Bradley (Died June 1938)	John C. Lodge	Fred W. Castator	Eugene Van Antwerp	Edward Jeffries
	George Engle (Until June 23, 1937)	John W. Smith	Richard Lindsay (Died January 7, 1937)	Arthur E. Dingeman (November 13, 1934 – Oct. 1935)	William P. Bradley (Died June 1938)	John C. Lodge	Fred W. Castator	Eugene Van Antwerp	Edward Jeffries
1936	George Engle (Until June 23, 1937)	John W. Smith	Richard Lindsay (Died January 7, 1937)	Robert G. Ewald (Out May 26, 1942)	William P. Bradley (Died June 1938)	John C. Lodge	Fred W. Castator	Eugene Van Antwerp	Edward Jeffries
		John W. Smith	John Kronk (Elected April 5, 1937)	Robert G. Ewald (Out May 26, 1942)	William P. Bradley (Died June 1938)	John C. Lodge	Fred W. Castator	Eugene Van Antwerp	Edward Jeffries
1938	Philip Breitmeyer	Harry I. Dingeman (Out April 10, 1941)	John Kronk (Elected April 5, 1937)	Robert G. Ewald (Out May 26, 1942)	William P. Bradley (Died June 1938)	John C. Lodge	Henry S. Sweeny	Eugene Van Antwerp	Edward Jeffries
	Philip Breitmeyer	Harry I. Dingeman (Out April 10, 1941)	John Kronk (Elected April 5, 1937)	Robert G. Ewald (Out May 26, 1942)	John W. Smith (Elected November 8, 1938, Died June 1942)	John C. Lodge	Henry S. Sweeny	Eugene Van Antwerp	Edward Jeffries
1940	Charles E. Dorais (Rsgd. May 27, 1947)	Harry I. Dingeman (Out April 10, 1941)	John Hamilton (Out April 2, 1941)	Robert G. Ewald (Out May 26, 1942)	John W. Smith (Elected November 8, 1938, Died June 1942)	John C. Lodge	Henry S. Sweeny	Eugene Van Antwerp	James H. Garlick
1942	Charles E. Dorais (Rsgd. May 27, 1947)	William G. Rogell	George C. Edwards	William A. Comstock (Died June 16, 1949)	John W. Smith (Elected November 8, 1938, Died June 1942)	John C. Lodge	Henry S. Sweeny	Eugene Van Antwerp	James H. Garlick
	Charles E. Dorais (Rsgd. May 27, 1947)	William G. Rogell	George C. Edwards	William A. Comstock (Died June 16, 1949)	Frank Cody (Elected November 3, 1942, Died April 1946)	John C. Lodge	Henry S. Sweeny	Eugene Van Antwerp	James H. Garlick
1944	Charles E. Dorais (Rsgd. May 27, 1947)	William G. Rogell	George C. Edwards	William A. Comstock (Died June 16, 1949)	Frank Cody (Elected November 3, 1942, Died April 1946)	John C. Lodge	Henry S. Sweeny	Eugene Van Antwerp	Fred C. Castator
1946	Charles E. Dorais (Rsgd. May 27, 1947)	William G. Rogell	George C. Edwards	William A. Comstock (Died June 16, 1949)	Frank Cody (Elected November 3, 1942, Died April 1946)	John C. Lodge	Charles G. Oakman	Eugene Van Antwerp	Fred C. Castator
		William G. Rogell	George C. Edwards	William A. Comstock (Died June 16, 1949)	Patrick V. McNamara (Elected November 5, 1946)	John C. Lodge	Charles G. Oakman	Eugene Van Antwerp	Fred C. Castator
1948	Louis C. Miriani	Charles F. Edgecomb	George C. Edwards	William A. Comstock (Died June 16, 1949)	Leo J. Nowicki (Resigned April 14, 1948)	Del A. Smith	Charles G. Oakman	John A. Kronk (Died February 13, 1954)	James H. Garlick
	Louis C. Miriani	Charles F. Edgecomb	George C. Edwards		Edward Connor (Elected November 2, 1948, Resigned December 31, 1966)	Del A. Smith	Charles G. Oakman	John A. Kronk (Died February 13, 1954)	James H. Garlick
1950	Louis C. Miriani	Edward Jeffries (Died April 2, 1950)	Mary Beck	William G. Rogell	Edward Connor (Elected November 2, 1948, Resigned December 31, 1966)	Del A. Smith	Charles G. Oakman	John A. Kronk (Died February 13, 1954)	James H. Garlick
	Louis C. Miriani	Eugene Van Antwerp (Elected November 7, 1950, Died August 5, 1962)	Mary Beck	William G. Rogell	Edward Connor (Elected November 2, 1948, Resigned December 31, 1966)	Del A. Smith	Charles G. Oakman	John A. Kronk (Died February 13, 1954)	James H. Garlick
1952	Louis C. Miriani	Eugene Van Antwerp (Elected November 7, 1950, Died August 5, 1962)	Mary Beck	William G. Rogell	Edward Connor (Elected November 2, 1948, Resigned December 31, 1966)	Del A. Smith	Charles G. Oakman	John A. Kronk (Died February 13, 1954)	James H. Garlick
1954	Louis C. Miriani	Eugene Van Antwerp (Elected November 7, 1950, Died August 5, 1962)	Mary Beck	William G. Rogell	Edward Connor (Elected November 2, 1948, Resigned December 31, 1966)	Del A. Smith	Charles Youngblood	John A. Kronk (Died February 13, 1954)	Blanche Parent Wise
	Louis C. Miriani	Eugene Van Antwerp (Elected November 7, 1950, Died August 5, 1962)	Mary Beck	William G. Rogell	Edward Connor (Elected November 2, 1948, Resigned December 31, 1966)	Del A. Smith	Charles Youngblood	James H. Lincoln (Elected November 2, 1944, Resigned May 5, 1960)	Blanche Parent Wise
1958	Ed Carey	Eugene Van Antwerp (Elected November 7, 1950, Died August 5, 1962)	Mary Beck	William G. Rogell	Edward Connor (Elected November 2, 1948, Resigned December 31, 1966)	Del A. Smith	William T. Patrick (Resigned December 31, 1963)	James H. Lincoln (Elected November 2, 1944, Resigned May 5, 1960)	Blanche Parent Wise
	Ed Carey	Eugene Van Antwerp (Elected November 7, 1950, Died August 5, 1962)	Mary Beck	William G. Rogell	Edward Connor (Elected November 2, 1948, Resigned December 31, 1966)	Del A. Smith	William T. Patrick (Resigned December 31, 1963)	Charles N. Youngblood (Elected November 8, 1960)	Blanche Parent Wise
1962	Ed Carey	Eugene Van Antwerp (Elected November 7, 1950, Died August 5, 1962)	Mary Beck	William G. Rogell	Edward Connor (Elected November 2, 1948, Resigned December 31, 1966)	James H. Brickley (Resigned January 15, 1967)	William T. Patrick (Resigned December 31, 1963)	Anthony Wierzbicki	Mel Ravitz
	Ed Carey	Phillip J. Van Antwerp (Elected April 1, 1963)	Mary Beck	William G. Rogell	Edward Connor (Elected November 2, 1948, Resigned December 31, 1966)	James H. Brickley (Resigned January 15, 1967)	William T. Patrick (Resigned December 31, 1963)	Anthony Wierzbicki	Mel Ravitz
	Ed Carey	Phillip J. Van Antwerp (Elected April 1, 1963)	Mary Beck	William G. Rogell	Edward Connor (Elected November 2, 1948, Resigned December 31, 1966)	James H. Brickley (Resigned January 15, 1967)	Thomas L. Poindexter (Elected November 3, 1964)	Anthony Wierzbicki	Mel Ravitz
1966	Ed Carey	Phillip J. Van Antwerp (Elected April 1, 1963)	Mary Beck	William G. Rogell	Edward Connor (Elected November 2, 1948, Resigned December 31, 1966)	James H. Brickley (Resigned January 15, 1967)	Louis C. Miriani	Nicholas Hood	Mel Ravitz
	Ed Carey	Phillip J. Van Antwerp (Elected April 1, 1963)	Mary Beck	William G. Rogell	Robert Tindal (Elected November 5, 1968, Died July 30, 1971)	Anthony J. Wierzbicki (Elected November 5, 1968)	Louis C. Miriani	Nicholas Hood	Mel Ravitz
1970	Carl M. Levin	Phillip J. Van Antwerp (Elected April 1, 1963)	David Eberhard	William G. Rogell	Robert Tindal (Elected November 5, 1968, Died July 30, 1971)	Anthony J. Wierzbicki (Elected November 5, 1968)	Ernest C. Browne Jr.	Nicholas Hood	Mel Ravitz
	Carl M. Levin	Phillip J. Van Antwerp (Elected April 1, 1963)	David Eberhard	William G. Rogell	Erma Henderson (Elected November 7, 1972)	Anthony J. Wierzbicki (Elected November 5, 1968)	Ernest C. Browne Jr.	Nicholas Hood	Mel Ravitz
1974	Carl M. Levin	Clyde Cleveland	David Eberhard	William G. Rogell	Erma Henderson (Elected November 7, 1972)	Maryann Mahaffey	Ernest C. Browne Jr.	Nicholas Hood	Jack Kelley
1978	Kenneth Cockrel Sr.	Clyde Cleveland	David Eberhard	William G. Rogell	Erma Henderson (Elected November 7, 1972)	Maryann Mahaffey	Herbert McFaddend Jr. (Died September 21, 1981)	Nicholas Hood	Jack Kelley
1982	Mel Ravitz	Clyde Cleveland	David Eberhard	Barbara-Rose Collins (Resigned 11/90)	Erma Henderson (Elected November 7, 1972)	Maryann Mahaffey	John W. Peoples	Nicholas Hood	Jack Kelley
1986	Mel Ravitz	Clyde Cleveland	David Eberhard	Barbara-Rose Collins (Resigned 11/90)	Erma Henderson (Elected November 7, 1972)	Maryann Mahaffey	John W. Peoples	Nicholas Hood	Jack Kelley
1990	Mel Ravitz	Clyde Cleveland	David Eberhard	Gil Hill	Keith Butler	Maryann Mahaffey	Kay Everett	Nicholas Hood	Jack Kelley
1994	Mel Ravitz	Clyde Cleveland	Alberta Tinsley-Talabi	Gil Hill	Nicholas Hood III	Maryann Mahaffey	Kay Everett	Sheila Cockrel	Brenda M. Scott (Died September 2, 2002)
1998	Kenneth Cockrel Jr.	Clyde Cleveland	Alberta Tinsley-Talabi	Gil Hill	Nicholas Hood III	Maryann Mahaffey	Kay Everett	Sheila Cockrel	Brenda M. Scott (Died September 2, 2002)
2002	Kenneth Cockrel Jr.	Sharon McPhail	Alberta Tinsley-Talabi	Barbara-Rose Collins	Alonzo W. Bates	Maryann Mahaffey	Kay Everett	Sheila Cockrel	Brenda M. Scott (Died September 2, 2002)
	Kenneth Cockrel Jr.	Sharon McPhail	Alberta Tinsley-Talabi	Barbara-Rose Collins	Alonzo W. Bates	Maryann Mahaffey	Kay Everett	Sheila Cockrel	JoAnn Watson (Elected April 29, 2003)
2006	Kenneth Cockrel Jr.	Monica Conyers	Alberta Tinsley-Talabi	Barbara-Rose Collins	Kwame Kenyatta (Resigned June 21, 2013)	Martha Reeves	Brenda Jones (see col 1 in 2014)	Sheila Cockrel	JoAnn Watson (Elected April 29, 2003)
2010	Kenneth Cockrel Jr.	Saunteel Jenkins {Resigned October 17, 2014)	James Tate; District 1, Council President Pro-Tem (2022–2026), Council President (2026–present)	Charles Pugh (Seat declared vacant July 8, 2013)	Kwame Kenyatta (Resigned June 21, 2013)	Andre L. Spivey; District 4 (Resigned September 29, 2021)	Brenda Jones (see col 1 in 2014)	Gary Brown (Resigned June 24, 2013)	JoAnn Watson (Elected April 29, 2003)
2014	Brenda Jones; At-Large; Council President	Saunteel Jenkins {Resigned October 17, 2014)	James Tate; District 1, Council President Pro-Tem (2022–2026), Council President (2026–present)	George Cushingberry Jr. District 2	Scott R. Benson; District 3	Andre L. Spivey; District 4 (Resigned September 29, 2021)	Mary Sheffield; District 5, Council President (2022–2026)	Raquel Castañeda-López; District 6	Gabe Leland; District 7 (Resigned May 3, 2021)
	Brenda Jones; At-Large; Council President	Janeé Ayers; At-Large (Appointed February 17, 2015; elected November 8, 2016)	James Tate; District 1, Council President Pro-Tem (2022–2026), Council President (2026–present)	George Cushingberry Jr. District 2	Scott R. Benson; District 3	Andre L. Spivey; District 4 (Resigned September 29, 2021)	Mary Sheffield; District 5, Council President (2022–2026)	Raquel Castañeda-López; District 6	Gabe Leland; District 7 (Resigned May 3, 2021)
2018	Brenda Jones; At-Large; Council President	Janeé Ayers; At-Large (Appointed February 17, 2015; elected November 8, 2016)	James Tate; District 1, Council President Pro-Tem (2022–2026), Council President (2026–present)	Roy McCalister Jr. District 2	Scott R. Benson; District 3	Andre L. Spivey; District 4 (Resigned September 29, 2021)	Mary Sheffield; District 5, Council President (2022–2026)	Raquel Castañeda-López; District 6	Gabe Leland; District 7 (Resigned May 3, 2021)
2022	Coleman Young II; At-Large, President Pro-Tem (2026–present)	Mary D. Waters; At-Large	James Tate; District 1, Council President Pro-Tem (2022–2026), Council President (2026–present)	Angela Whitfield-Calloway; District 2	Scott R. Benson; District 3	Latisha Johnson; District 4	Mary Sheffield; District 5, Council President (2022–2026)	Gabriela Santiago-Romero; District 6	Fred Durhal III; District 7
2026	Coleman Young II; At-Large, President Pro-Tem (2026–present)	Mary D. Waters; At-Large	James Tate; District 1, Council President Pro-Tem (2022–2026), Council President (2026–present)	Angela Whitfield-Calloway; District 2	Scott R. Benson; District 3	Latisha Johnson; District 4	Renata Miller; District 5	Gabriela Santiago-Romero; District 6	Denzel Anton McCampbell; District 7

== Salaries ==
Salaries for elected officials are recommended every odd-numbered year by the Detroit Elected Officials Compensation Commission. The 7-member board is appointed by the mayor and approved by the council, each member serving a 7-year term.

City council approved a recommendation by the commission in February 2023, with an immediate pay increase of 7% and 3.5% each fiscal year for the next three years. Regular City Council members will be paid $106,231 annually by July 2025, while the City Council President will be paid $111,647. Prior to 2015, increases had not happened since 2001.

== See also ==
- Government of Detroit, Michigan
- List of mayors of Detroit, Michigan
