= Gary Hugh Brown =

American painter

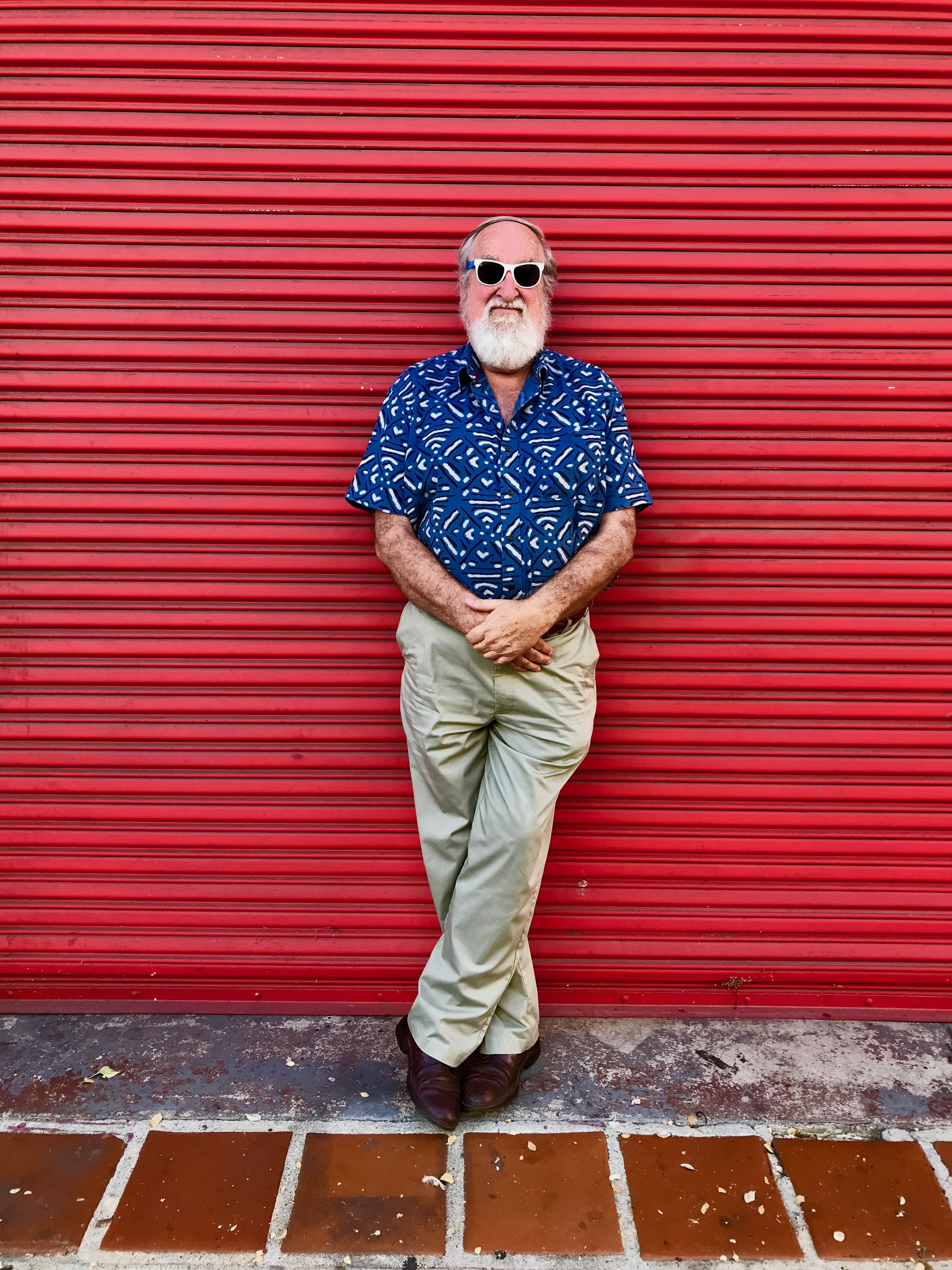
- Gary Brown
- Born: 1941 (age 84–85)
- Education: DePauw University (BA); University of Wisconsin–Madison (MFA)
- Known for: Painting, drawing, printmaking, journaling
- Awards: The Elizabeth Greenshields Foundation, Travel Grant

Gary Hugh Brown (born 1941) is an American artist, painter, draftsman, and professor emeritus of art at the University of California, Santa Barbara. Brown has a drawing in the collection of the Santa Barbara Museum of Art. He has exhibited his work in Japan, Ireland, Brazil, and the United States.

== Early life and education ==
Brown was born to Earl Hugh and Dorothy Aileen Brown in 1941, in Evansville, Indiana. While a student, Brown designed and painted sets for the Mesker Amphitheatre in Evansville.

In 1966, Brown received a Master of Fine Arts from University of Wisconsin–Madison in Madison, Wisconsin.

== Career ==
Brown worked as an artist in Wisconsin, exhibiting his art at several galleries in the area. In that same year he accepted a position as assistant professor at UCSB. In September 1966, Brown had a one-person exhibition at the Evansville Museum of Arts, History and Science in Evansville, Indiana, where he was reviewed by The Courier-Journal. In February 1971, Brown's watercolors were displayed at the Plaza Gallery of Fine Arts in Oxnard, California. His work was influenced by his travels. Another exhibition in 1972, selected by Richard Ames, a critic for the Santa Barbara News-Press, was at the Gallery de Silva in Montecito Village. It included Landscape Reflection, a self-portrait of Brown done in 1971. Brown did the drawings of the Santa Cruz Mountain Poems, by poet and author Morton Marcus in November 1972.

Included in Anthology were Brown's drawings of the Devereaux Series sketchbooks and prints at the Art/Life Gallery.

In November 1991, Brown had a solo exhibition at the Allan Hancock College Art Gallery in Santa Maria, California.

His work was displayed at the Evansville Museum of Arts, History and Science in 1966 and in one man shows Folded Drawings, at the Fleischer-Anhalt gallery, Los Angeles in 1967.
