= Gary Brown (Michigan politician) =

American politician and police officer

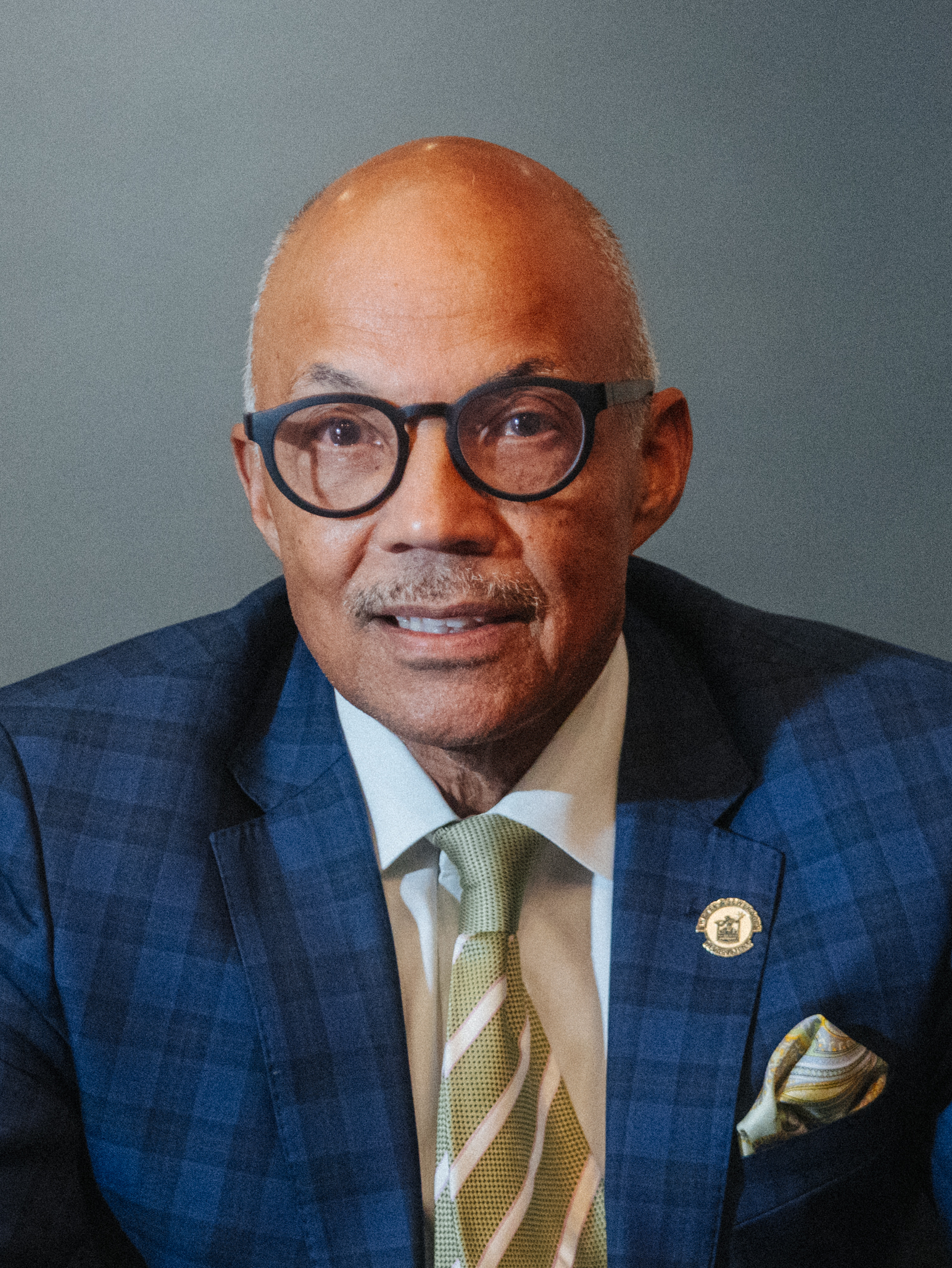
- Brown in 2025

Chief Operations Officer for the City of Detroit
- Incumbent
- Assumed office November 2013

Gary A. Brown (born 1953) is an American municipal politician and former police officer. He is currently serving as the Chief Operations Officer for the City of Detroit. Brown was elected as the Detroit City Council President Pro-Tem on November 4, 2009 after receiving the second most votes. He was appointed to the non-elected position of Chief Compliance Officer in June 2013 under the state-appointed Emergency Manager Kevyn Orr. Following the election of Mike Duggan as Mayor of the City of Detroit in November 2013, Brown was appointed as the Chief Operations Officer under the Mayor, a position he currently serves. The former Deputy Chief of the Detroit Police Department was born in Detroit, Michigan in 1953 and remains a Detroit resident with his wife.

Gary A. Brown was born and raised in Detroit, Michigan. He is a graduate of Detroit's Northwestern High School. While in high school, Brown worked as a bagger at a Farmer Jack supermarket in Detroit. When he left seven years later, he was the assistant store manager. Brown entered the United States Marine Corps during this same timeframe, and within two years, received three promotions. After being honorably discharged, he attended Wayne State University in Detroit and received a Bachelor of Science Degree in Criminal Justice.

In addition, Brown earned a Master of Science degree from Eastern Michigan University and attended the FBI National Academy, as well as Northwestern University's Staff and Command.

Brown joined the Detroit Police Department in 1977 and was selected president of his recruit class. During his 26 years of service with the police department, he began as a patrol officer and upon his retirement was the Deputy Police Chief. In between, Brown served as Commander of the 1st, 3rd, 9th and 11th Precincts, and during different periods led Gang Squad, Narcotics and Internal Affairs (as deputy chief). He was the first African-American to receive the highest score on the Detroit Police Lieutenant's Promotional Examination.

Brown was wrongly fired as Deputy Police Chief by former City of Detroit Mayor Kwame Kilpatrick in May 2003 and was part of a successful $8.4 million whistle-blowers' lawsuit against the City of Detroit which reclassified his firing as retirement.

Brown is the founder and owner of Brown & Associates, a case consultant firm for law enforcement and private security litigation. He is married and has three children and four grandchildren.

== 2009 Election ==
The 2009 City of Detroit council race was the first time Gary A. Brown ran for public office after having served in the Detroit Police Department. More than 160 Detroit citizens filed petitions to seek one of the nine council seats. Brown ran on the platform of returning integrity, ethics and visionary leadership to the Detroit City Council which had in recent years been faced with corruption.

Brown received the second highest number of votes in the election, earning the position of Council President Pro Tem, which is the number two position on the Council and second in the line of succession (after the City Council President) to be the Mayor of Detroit.

In late June 2013, Brown announced he would be resigning his seat on the City Council effective July 1, 2013, to become the Chief Compliance Officer under then-Detroit Emergency Manager Kevyn Orr. Brown said part of his reasons for resigning is that he felt he could have more of an impact in Detroit's future working for Orr, rather than the Council, whose authority had been severely limited since Gov. Rick Snyder appointed Orr as Detroit's Emergency Manager.

== Electoral history ==
- 2009 Election for City Council (Detroit)
  - Charles Pugh (D), 9%
  - Gary A. Brown (D) (inc.), 9%
  - Saunteel Jenkins (D), 8%
  - Kenneth Cockrel Jr. (D), 8%
  - Brenda B. Jones (D), 7%
  - Andre L. Spivey (D), 6%
  - James Tate (D), 6%
  - Kwame Kenyetta (D), 6%
  - JoAnn Watson (D), 6%
- 2009 Primary Election for City Council (Detroit)
  - Charles Pugh
  - Ken Cockrel Jr.
  - Gary Brown
  - Brenda B. Jones
  - Saunteel Jenkins
  - Kwame Kenyatta
  - JoAnn Watson
  - Jai-Lee Dearing
  - Alberta Tinsley-Talabi
  - Andrew L. Spivey
  - James Tate
  - Lisa Howze
  - Shelley I. Foy
  - Fred Elliott Hall
  - Raphael B. Johnson
  - Mohamed Okdie
  - David J. Cross
  - John K. Bennett
