= Afro-American Cultural Center at Yale =

Cultural house on the campus of Yale University

The Afro-American Cultural Center at Yale is a cultural house on the campus of Yale University in New Haven, Connecticut. The center opened in 1969 after the Yale Corporation approved the establishment of a space for black students and community members. The Afro-American Cultural Center is home to over thirty resident student organizations including the Black Student Alliance at Yale, the Urban Improvement Corps, the Black Church at Yale, Rhythmic Blue, and the Black Men's Union. Timeica Bethel, Assistant Dean of Yale College, currently serves as the Director.

== History ==
In September 1964, 14 black males students matriculated to Yale, a record number for the time. Along with black upperclassmen, these freshmen launched the first Spook Weekend, a huge social weekend that brought hundreds of Black students to Yale from throughout the Northeast. The next year the Yale Discussion Group on Negro Affairs was founded. The discussion group soon became the Black Student Alliance at Yale, (BSAY), in 1967. Among the founding members of BSAY were Donald Ogilvie ’68, Armstead Robinson ’68, Glen DeChabert ’70, Woody Brittain ’70, Craig Foster ’69, and Ralph Dawson ’71. BSAY advocated for increased black enrollment, the development of Afro-American Studies, improved relations with the African-American community of New Haven, and the establishment of a cultural center for black students on Yale’s campus. In 1968, undergraduate students founded the Urban Improvement Corps, an organization that aimed to help local New Haven students through tutoring and mentoring.

In the spring of 1968, the Yale Corporation approved the establishment of a center for black Students and community members. The center was named Afro-America and opened in the fall of 1969 in a house on Chapel Street, a block from its current location. For the next year, students would use “the House” as it quickly became nicknamed, for meetings and other social gatherings. The center moved to its current location of 211 Park Street in 1970. Over the next year, the center received a grant from the Cummins Foundation, which allocated funds for travel, speakers, internships, and student-run publications.

Around this time, the center was also a center of organizing and political protest during the New Haven Black Panther Trials of 1970. Students from the Afro-American Cultural Center helped to house visiting Black Panthers. Ralph Dawson, moderator of the Black Student Alliance at Yale, and Kurt Schmoke played important roles as liaisons between the undergraduate community and the administration.

The name of the center was changed from Afro-America to its present name, the Afro-American Cultural Center, in 1974 and in the same year Khalid Lum was appointed by the Yale College administration to serve as the center’s first full-time director.

In 1981, 211 Park St.: Newsletter of the Afro-American Cultural Center at Yale was established as a quarterly publication superseding Liberator.

In 2004, Director Pamela George and a group of alumni led a massive fundraising effort to pay for renovations and to establish the Ogilvie, Robinson, and DeChabert Leadership Forum. The ORD endowment was created in memory of three of the principle founders of the House and African-American Studies. The endowment is used to support leadership programming at the center and sponsors the Higher Education Initiative, a weeklong annual public service trip held in conjunction with the Yale Black Alumni Association.

== Black Studies ==
In the spring of 1968, students from the Black Student Alliance at Yale submitted a proposal to the Yale College administration calling for the creation of an Afro-American Studies major at the university. Yale College Dean Georges May appointed a planning committee, chaired by political science professor Robert A. Dahl composed of both undergraduates and faculty. The planning committee reached an agreement by the fall of 1968. On December 12 of the same year, the establishment of the new major was unanimously approved by the entire faculty and was officially offered to students in September 1969. This feat made Yale the first major university in the country to offer a degree conferring Afro-American studies major. In the fall of 1972 Yale's first undergraduate lecture course in the History of Jazz was initiated by Maury Yeston while he was a PhD graduate student in Music Theory, having created the course and taught it several years earlier as a Wilson Teaching Fellow at Lincoln University (Pennsylvania) - America's oldest Black College.

== The Center ==
Originally, the building at 211 Park Street was home to the Yale chapter of Chi Psi fraternity. The building still contains small elements left over from the fraternity. Most noticeably, Greek lettering can be found in the foundational stonework of the building as well as the stained glass. In the 1960s, the University bought the building, along with the surrounding buildings, then known as Frat Row, in response to withering undergraduate fraternity life and a new desire for social equality that was contradictory to what the fraternity system traditionally stood for. Today, the building contains a library, a game room (known as the Lighten Room), a kitchen, and several large multipurpose rooms.

== Directors of the Afro-American Cultural Center ==
- Khalid Lum 1974-79
- Dr. Patricia Romney 1979-81
- Caroline Jackson 1981-89
- Melvin Wade, 1989–91
- Kim Goff-Crews, 1992–98
- Frank Mitchell, 1998–99
- Pamela George, 1999-2010
- Dr. Rodney T. Cohen, 2010–2015
- Risë Nelson, 2015-2022
- Timeica Bethel, 2022–present

== Resident Groups ==
The center features 30 student organizations ranging from academic, cultural, political/ethnic, performance, community service and Greek life.

- Alpha Phi Alpha fraternity
- Black Church at Yale
- Black Graduate Network
- Black Men's Union
- Breath of Life
- Black Student Alliance at Yale
- Delta Sigma Theta sorority
- DZANA
- Generational African American Student Association at Yale
- Heritage Theatre Ensemble
- Kappa Alpha Psi fraternity
- KONJO!
- Minority Association of Pre-Medical Students
- Yale Chapter of the NAACP
- National Society of Black Engineers
- Pan, Jam, and Lime Steel Band
- Paul Huggins African Drumming Core
- Rhythmic Blue
- Shades
- Steppin' Out
- Teeth
- Urban Improvement Corps
- WORD
- Yale African Student Association
- Yale Black Women's Coalition
- Yale Gospel Choir
- Yale Caribbean Student Organization
- Yale Undergraduate Black Pre-Law Association
