= List of killings by law enforcement officers in the United States, April 2022 =

This is a list of people reported killed by non-military law enforcement officers in the United States in April 2022, whether in the line of duty or not, and regardless of reason or method. The listing documents the occurrence of a death, making no implications regarding wrongdoing or justification on the part of the person killed or officer involved. Killings are arranged by date of the incident that caused death. Different death dates, if known, are noted in the description. The table below lists 41 people.

== April 2022 ==
Date	Name (age) of deceased	Race	City/state	Description
2022-04-30	Jonathan Daniel Laubscher (28)	White	Duluth, Georgia	
2022-04-30	Carmello Brumfield (16)	Black	Jackson, Mississippi	
2022-04-30	Bradley S. Allen (35)	White	Beatrice, Nebraska	
2022-04-29	Stephen Scott Wheeler (48)	White	Jasonville, Indiana	Decedent was shot and killed after threatening police with knife.
2022-04-29	Chase McDermott (22)	Black	Fairburn, Georgia	
2022-04-29	Jamie Feith (34)	White	Hyde Park, New York	Hyde Park police responded to Feith's call about a "domestic violence situation." During their interaction in her home, appearing to "[have] a meltdown," she drew and brandished a folding knife. Police tased Feith, which "seemingly had no effect," then fatally shot her.
2022-04-27	Daniel Ryan Palato (39)	White	Lakeside, Florida	Police believed the decedent was armed with a firearm shot him after a short vehicle pursuit. The decedent was unarmed.
2022-04-27	Jayden Baez (20)	Unknown	Kissimmee, Florida	Police responding to reports of a suspicious vehicle were told by Target employees that two men wearing masks had just left with a stolen pizza and Pokémon Trading Cards. Police initially released few details, other than that an officer involved shooting occurred and one man was killed. One man, Baez, was killed, and two others were wounded by gunfire, with attorneys stating the deputies involved fired into their vehicle without identifying themselves and that one of the wounded had his hands in the air when he was shot.
2022-04-27	Jalen Randle (29)	Black	Houston, Texas	Following a car chase Randle exited his vehicle holding a bag and a shoe. Bodycam footage shows an officer yelling a command at Randle, but shooting him before he finished his sentence. The video also shows the officer react in surprise after shooting Randle. An autopsy showed Randle was shot in the back of the neck.
2022-04-26	Frank Robles (53)	White	Roseville, Michigan	Police responded after Robles, who may have been experiencing a mental health crisis, crashed his truck in a head-on collision with a semi-trailer truck, shooting Robles after he refused to drop a knife at the scene.
2022-04-23	Clifford Jones (65)	Unknown	Seattle, Washington	An off-duty Auburn police officer was arrested for striking a pedestrian after losing control of his car. The officer was arrested and processed for DUI.
2022-04-21	Kevin Lee Mahan (43)	White	Jacksonville, Florida	A police officer from the Jacksonville Sheriff's Office shot and killed Mahan who was armed with an axe.
2022-04-21	Jeffrie Glover Jr. (34)	Unknown	Mott, North Dakota	A deputy responded to reports of a disturbance at Mott-Regent Public School and shot Glover. Police say Glover assaulted the deputy before he was shot.
2022-04-20	Gordon Casey (19)	White	Washington, D.C.	Secret Service agents responded to reports of a robbery at the home of the Peruvian ambassador Oswaldo de Rivero. Police say the agents encountered Casey outside the home holding a metal pole. Secret Service agents attempted to use electronic control devices and shot Casey when they didn’t work.
2022-04-20	Bryant Jackson (28)	Black	Yonkers, New York	An FBI agent and a Yonkers police detective attempted to arrest several men in connection to a gun investigation when one, Jackson, pulled out a gun and shot the detective. The FBI agent then shot and killed Jackson. The detective is expected to survive.
2022-04-18	Guy Walker	Unknown	Vinita, Oklahoma	A Vinita Police officer and Craig County deputy shot and killed Walker outside his home after he allegedly threatened them with a bow and arrow.
2022-04-16	Amelia Baca (75)	Latino	Las Cruces, New Mexico	An officer responding to reports of a woman making threats shot and killed Baca, who police say was armed with a knife. A family member of Baca says that Baca had dementia, and claimed that Baca had knives next to her, but not in her hand.
2022-04-14	Timmy Lee Thurman Jr (28)	White	Bristol, Tennessee	An officer attempted to pull a vehicle over that he noticed was 'driving erratically.' Thurman allegedly fired shots out of the window and fled, eventually driving into a yard before leaving the vehicle and running behind a house. Officers shot and killed Thurman when he allegedly pointed a gun at them when they attempted to make contact.
2022-04-11	Ali Coulter (20)	Black	Covington, Kentucky	Wanted on a murder charge, Coulter appeared with a loaded handgun when officers arrived outside his house. Coulter refused to drop his weapon, and then fled through the neighborhood. Officers approached him again outside a nearby house, and shot him dead when he refused to drop his gun.
2022-04-10	David Paul Dixon (36)	Unknown	Savannah, Georgia	Savannah police responded to a call of two men fighting. When they ordered Dixon to drop the weapon, he ignored and swung his weapon at officers. Tasers were ineffective. One of the officers fatally shot him.
2022-04-08	Luke Imaizumi Atoigue	Pacific Islander	Tamuning, Guam	Police shot and killed a man after a chase in Harmon. Video shows the man holding what appears to be a rifle before police fired at him. After the shooting it was determined the man was pointing an airsoft weapon.
2022-04-08	Unknown	Unknown	Taylor, Michigan	A man who barricaded himself in an apartment for two hours and emerged shooting at police was killed when police returned fire.
2022-04-07	Unknown (53)	Unknown	New York City, New York	An NYPD van struck a homeless pedestrian in Brooklyn. A witness claims the driver was attempting to beat a red light when he struck the man.
2022-04-07	Dustin F. Saffell (32)	White	Benton Harbor, Michigan	Saffell, who was pulled over and had open warrants, fired at Benton Harbor police and was killed when police returned fire.
2022-04-04	Patrick Lyoya (26)	Black	Grand Rapids, Michigan	Patrick Lyoya was driving with a blood alcohol content three times the legal limit when a GRPD officer stopped him for an improper license plate. Lyoya and the officer struggled over the officer's taser and the officer, who was on top of the prone-positioned Lyoya, shot him in the back of the head.
2022-04-03	Ketura Wilson (21)	Black	Oak Forest, Illinois	Police say Wilson was being transported for a mental health evaluation when she escaped and ran to a nearby store where she allegedly fired at police before being shot. An officer was wounded by gunfire.
2022-04-03	Frank Campbell (58)	Black	Chicago, Illinois	A man who shot his girlfriend and another man started a standoff with SWAT team which lasted about two hours. He fired at SWAT team members and was eventually killed when he raised the gun at them.
2022-04-03	Darius Kirkwood (20)	Unknown race	Wynne, Arkansas	Kirkwood was wanted by police for a shooting case which left one dead and one injured. After a pursuit, a shootout occurred and he was killed. A sheriff was wounded.
2022-04-03	Joshua Seth King (32)	White	Tucson, Arizona	
2022-04-02	Adam Cobb (32)	White	Pana, Illinois	
2022-04-02	Charles Carswell (32)	White	Oklahoma City, Oklahoma	
2022-04-02	Rance Tillman (31)	Black	Laramie, Wyoming	
2022-04-02	James Allen Miller (31)	White	Savannah, Georgia	
2022-04-02	Ralph Ennis (77)	White	Front Royal, Virginia	
2022-04-01	James Sheets (35)	White	Youngstown, Ohio	Sheets was shot and killed by a Struthers officer after police say he pulled a gun following a chase.
2022-04-01	Jeremiah Evans (65)	Unknown race	Sarasota, Florida	
2022-04-01	Luis Guerrero Amezcua (35)	Hispanic	Santa Ana, California	
2022-04-01	Jerry Raleigh Livingston (39)	White	Charleston, Tennessee	
2022-04-01	Jimmy Ray Whiteside (63)	White	Spartanburg, South Carolina	
2022-04-01	Taylor John Crabb (37)	White	Albuquerque, New Mexico	
2022-04-01	Jeremy Denna Berg (43)	White	Purgitsville, West Virginia	

== See also ==
- Death in custody § United States
- Henry A. Wallace Police Crime Public Database
- List of cases of police brutality
- List of countries with annual rates and counts for killings by law enforcement officers
- List of law enforcement officers killed in the line of duty in the United States
- List of law enforcement officers convicted for an on-duty killing in the United States
- List of shootings by US immigration agents
- List of police reforms related to the George Floyd protests
- List of unarmed African Americans killed by law enforcement officers in the United States
- Lists of killings by law enforcement officers
- Police brutality in the United States
- Police misconduct § United States
- Police riot § United States
- Police use of deadly force in the United States
