= George Floyd protests in Michigan =

Protests in Michigan caused by the murder of George Floyd

- Part of George Floyd protests
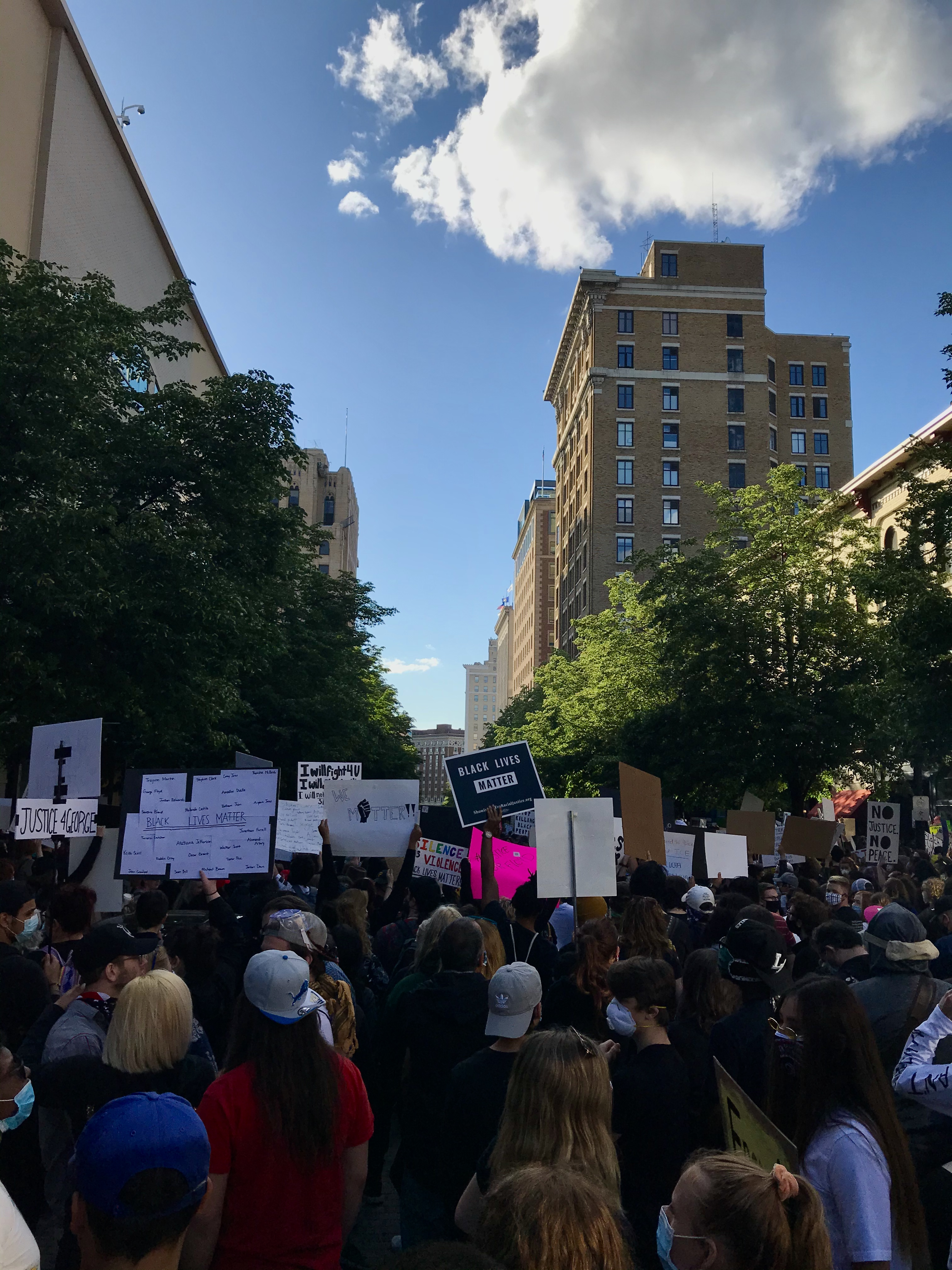
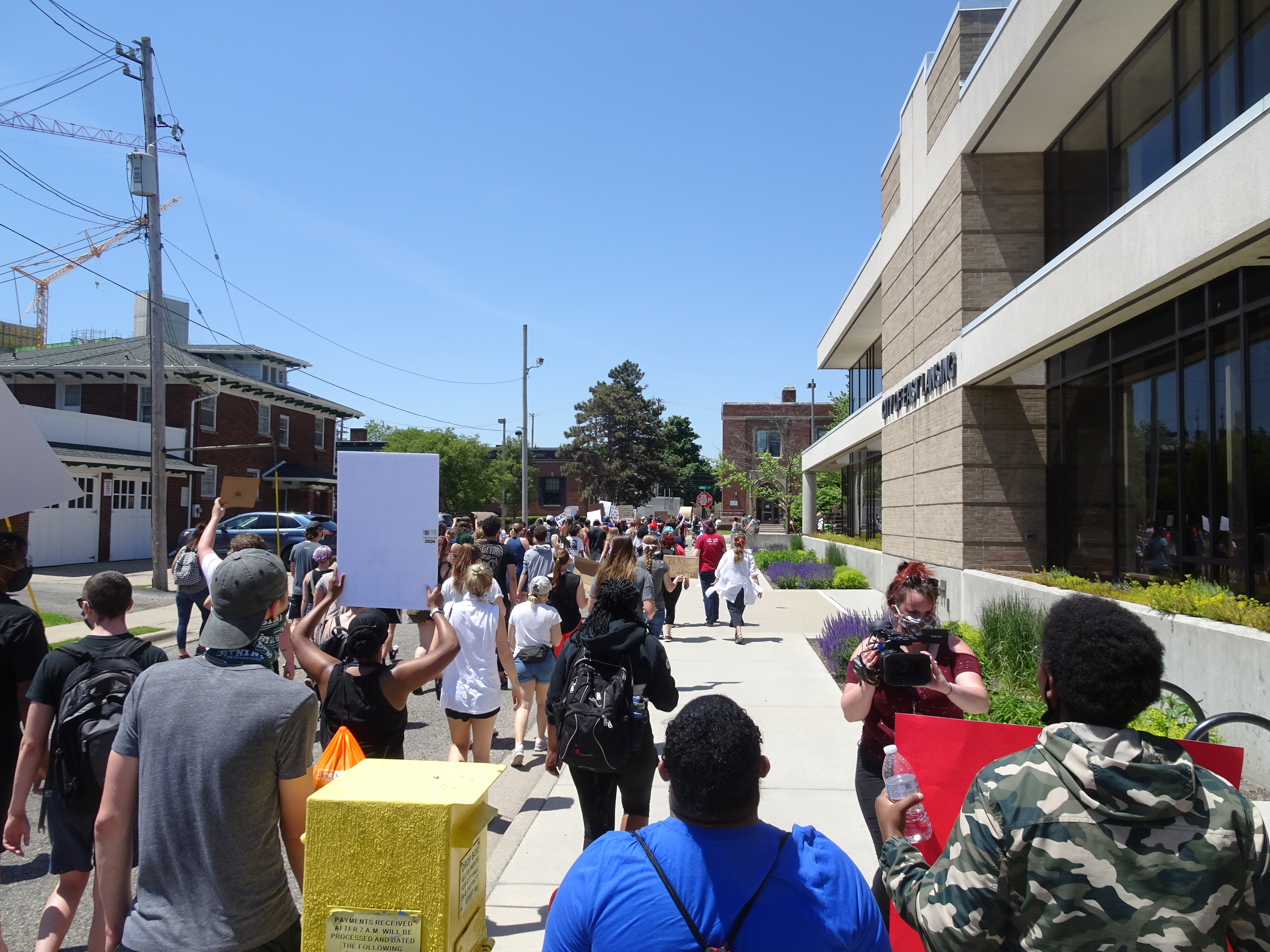
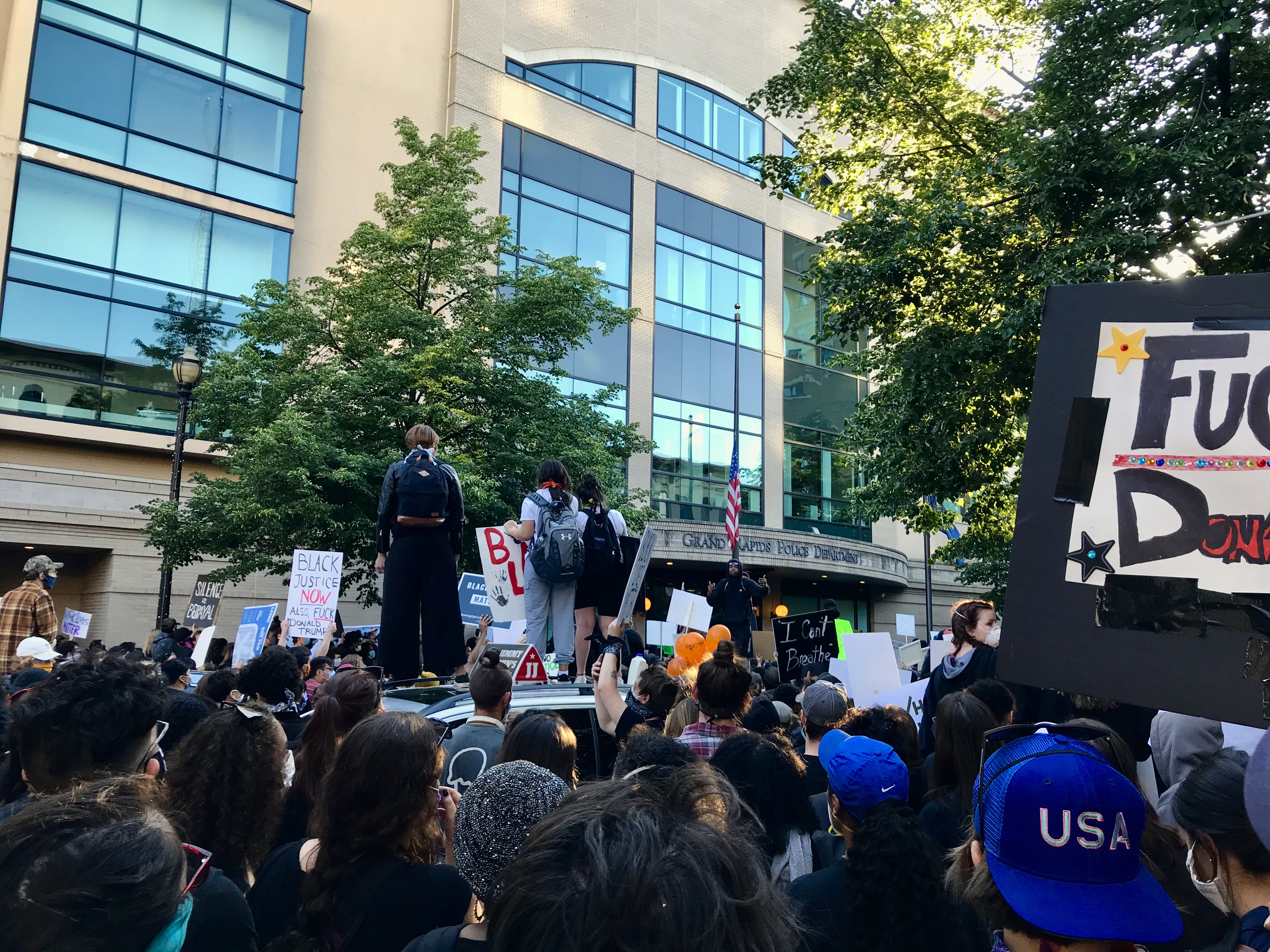
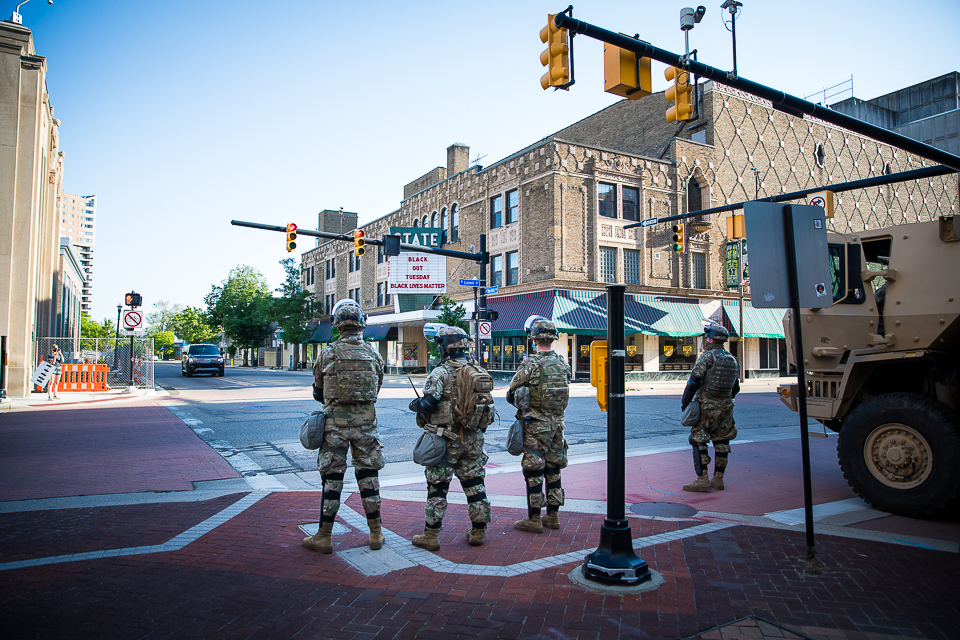
- From top, left to right: Protesters marching in Monroe Center in Grand Rapids, a march in East Lansing, Michigan, a demonstration outside of the Grand Rapids Police Department, Michigan National Guard in Kalamazoo.
- Date: May 28 – August 2020 (2 months and 4 days)
- Location: Michigan, United States
- Caused by: Police brutality; Institutional racism against African Americans; Reaction to the murder of George Floyd; Economic, racial and social inequality

Cities in Michigan in which a protest with about 100 or more participants was held

This is a list of protests that took place in Michigan in 2020 following the murder of George Floyd.

== Locations ==
=== Ann Arbor ===
Hundreds of protesters gathered on the central square of the University of Michigan on May 30, with a series of activists and community members using a megaphone to speak about racial injustice and police violence. That day and for several days beforehand, protesters also marched through the streets of Ann Arbor. These protests were related to an event in neighboring Ypsilanti on May 26, in which a police officer had been filmed punching a local woman and then taking her into custody, where she was held for several days.

=== Bad Axe ===
On June 5, over 200 protesters showed up in front of the Huron County building to raise awareness for the Black Lives Matter protests occurring nationwide and worldwide following Floyd's murder. Bad Axe police chief David Rothe and Huron County sheriff Kelly Hanson were seen marching alongside the protesters. Police presence was able to maintain peace despite numerous armed individuals showing up to oppose the protest until crowds started to disperse at around 6 pm. The event, coordinated by multiple local and national civic groups, was described as being well organized, peaceful, and focused.

=== Bay City ===
On Wednesday, June 3, hundreds of protesters marched outside the Bay County Law Enforcement Center in downtown Bay City. Bay City Public Safety Director Michael J. Cecchini was invited to march alongside the protesters, but he declined, stating that police in his department do not join marches, regardless of the cause. Cecchini explained that he received an email invitation from the protest organizer and replied to it stating that he wanted to first meet with the organizer prior to accepting the invitation. However, Cecchini claimed he did not receive any response.

=== Cassopolis ===
About 100 people marched from Clisbee Park to the police station on Broadway at 3 pm on June 13.

=== Cheboygan ===
Over a hundred people demonstrated at a park on June 4.

=== Dearborn ===
On June 7, hundreds of demonstrators surrounded the Dearborn Historical Museum in Dearborn to peacefully protest against racism and police brutality. Most protesters wore masks to protect against the spread of COVID-19. The crowd listened to speakers prior to marching down Brady Street and across Michigan Avenue while chanting "No justice, no peace". Demonstrators also celebrated the removal of the statue of former Dearborn mayor Orville Hubbard, known for his support of racism and segregation. The statue's removal came days after the statue had a Black Lives Matter T-shirt placed over it. Moving forward, protesters look forward to removing his name from streets, ballrooms, and buildings nearby. Speakers at the protest included Debbie Dingell, the U.S. representative for Michigan's 12th congressional district, Rashida Tlaib, the U.S. representative for Michigan's 13th congressional district, and Abdullah Hammoud, the state representative for Michigan's 15th district.

=== Detroit ===
Hundreds protested in downtown Detroit starting on May 29. Some protesters were seen throwing items at police officers and taunting them. At least 61 people were arrested. On the night of May 29 an unknown assailant fired shots into a vehicle downtown around 11:30 pm; a 21-year-old Eastpointe man in the vehicle was hit and died from his injuries at a local hospital. It was initially thought that this man was 19 years old and that the assailant fired from a vehicle; this was later proven otherwise. On Sunday night, mayor Mike Duggan imposed a curfew from 8 pm to 5 am Monday and more than 100 people were arrested on Gratiot Avenue. On June 1, a ten-mile march was attended by several hundred protesters that spanned from downtown Detroit to the city's southwest boundary. Protesters ignored Detroit's 8 pm curfew with authorities taking no actions against protesters, allowing the demonstrations to end peacefully.

Subsequent protests continued each day afterward, remaining largely peaceful. By the time the 8 pm curfew ended on June 8, an estimated 400 protesters in Detroit had been arrested. The curfew was not renewed. On June 28, two protesters were violently thrown from a Detroit Police Department SUV that they had climbed on top of, and its rear window was also smashed in.

On August 22, forty people were arrested while protesting Operation Legend in Downtown Detroit. Police also used tear gas and pepper spray on the crowd of about 100 people.

=== Flint ===
Hundreds of protesters shut down Miller Road in the Flint Township on May 30. Genesee County Sheriff Chris Swanson spoke to the crowd saying he wanted to stand in solidarity with the protesters. On June 1, hundreds gathered for a peace rally at Flint City Hall.

=== Gladwin ===
On June 4, around 75 people peacefully marched through downtown Gladwin to support Black Lives Matter and George Floyd. Gladwin County Sheriff Mike Shea spoke in support of the event's organizers, but criticized the growing negative view of cops.

=== Grand Rapids ===
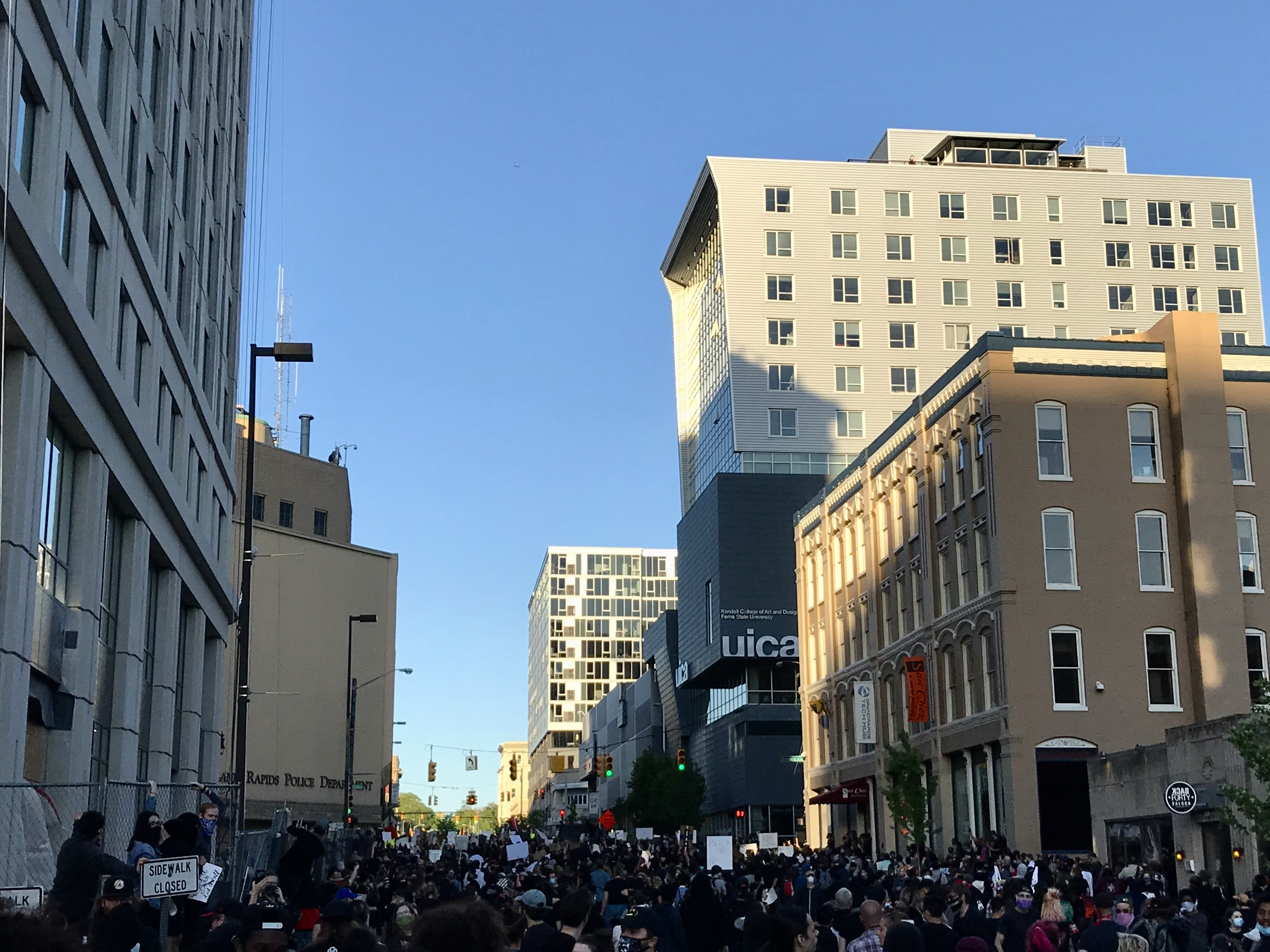
Protests on Fulton Street in Grand Rapids on May 30, 2020.

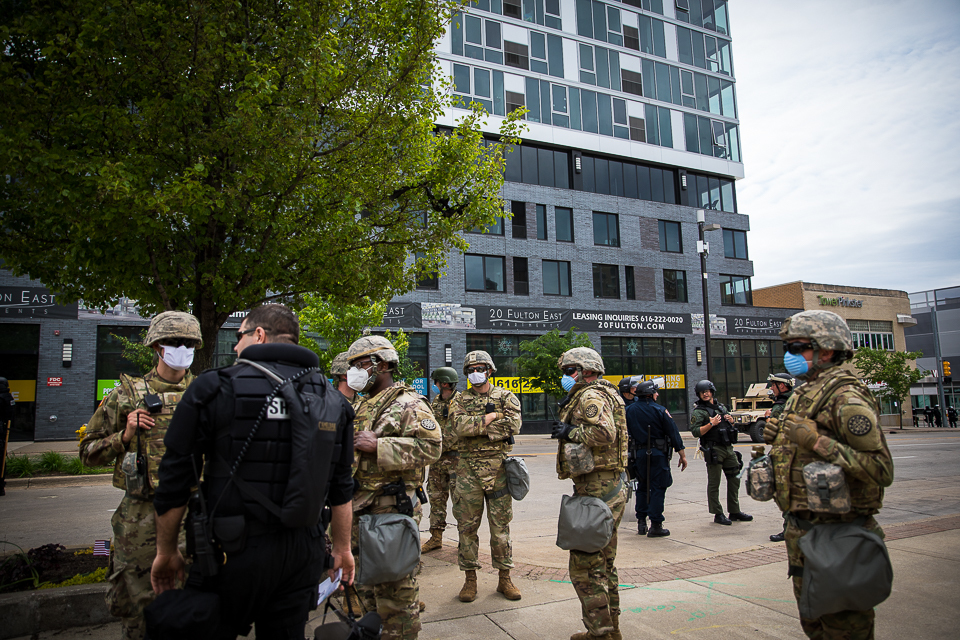
Michigan National Guard deployed in Grand Rapids on June 1

Thousands of demonstrators marched in downtown Grand Rapids on Saturday, May 30. The protesters initially gathered at Rosa Parks Circle for a silent protest while other demonstrators moved to the headquarters of the Grand Rapids Police Department where interactions intensified. That same day, Grand Rapids police chief Eric Payne spoke to protesters stating "I've heard you my entire career. Black lives do matter", with clashes later intensifying with protesters beginning to throw objects at police. Riot police dispersed demonstrators with tear gas and flash bangs. A viral video from the protests showed Grand Rapids Police pepper spraying a protester and then immediately firing a tear gas canister into his shoulder. Into the early morning hours of May 31, looting and fires began to spread through downtown Grand Rapids. Mayor of Grand Rapids Rosalynn Bliss enforced a 7pm-5am curfew for the city beginning that day until June 2, calling for support from the Michigan National Guard. Citizens also arrived downtown during the day to assist with clean-up efforts following the riots. Only a few protesters were arrested on Sunday for violating the city's curfew.

For the first time in Kent County history, prosecutors began to file riot charges on June 1 against particular persons accused of breaking windows and stealing property in the riot of previous days. By June 3, a total of seven persons had been charged, six of them with riot offenses. Protesters downtown grew in numbers over time that day until about 200 people peacefully confronted the Michigan National Guard, Michigan State Police and Grand Rapids Police near Van Andel Arena. Grand Rapids police chief Eric Payne spoke to protesters that day but did not amplify his voice, leaving when protesters asked him to join the demonstration, with Payne later saying the protest was not permitted by city officials. Some protesters would later violate the city's 7 pm curfew and subsequently chased by authorities. In total, 12 people were arrested for violating curfew.

After the curfew ended on June 2, city manager Mark Washington called for the extension of the curfew, though all Grand Rapids officials except for City Commissioner Nathaniel Moody ignored the proposal. Grand Rapids officials said it was time to trust protesters to demonstrate peacefully, with City Commissioner Kurt Reppart stating "I’m really not interesting in arresting people who are protesting peacefully".

=== Houghton ===
On June 3, hundreds of demonstrators of all ages and races marched across the Portage Lake Lift Bridge in Houghton while chanting "No justice, no peace", "Black Lives Matter", and "Say his name, George Floyd" in protest of police brutality. The protest was entirely peaceful, and organizers worked with local police departments to make sure the proceedings went on safely and civilly; the police handed out flowers as a peace offering.

=== Kalamazoo ===
Two protests on May 30 in Kalamazoo brought in thousands of protesters with both protests shutting down major traffic intersections and were peaceful. On June 1, peaceful protests occurred into the evening. Vandalism then began to occur overnight, damaging a number of businesses in the city. Kalamazoo officials established a 7 pm curfew on June 2. Protests occurred again that day, with about 100 protesters staying past the 7 pm curfew to confront a National Guard barricade on Michigan Avenue. Assistant Chief Vernon Coakley Jr. and City Manager Jim Ritsema spoke with protesters for about forty minutes after the curfew, attempting to have them march away from the site with no success. Tear gas was then deployed and the protest dispersed, with Coakley later stating that he "felt awful" for firing chemical agents upon a peaceful demonstration.

On August 15, members of the right-wing group Proud Boys clashed with counter-protesters in Kalamazoo, with police carrying out nine arrests, including a local newspaper reporter, who was later released without facing charges. The city's Police Chief Karianne Thomas said of the protest, "The Proud Boys came to town and completed their mission by creating a decisive situation for the community then leaving, hopefully with the chaos continuing, which is their mode of operation". The city's response to the protest has been criticized since only locals were arrested, none of them members of the Proud Boys. City commission members and residents called for resignations and firings during a 6.5 hour meeting on August 17 then went into the early morning hours of August 18.

=== Lake Orion ===
On June 7, hundreds of protesters marched through downtown Lake Orion in support of the Black Lives Matter movement. One of the protesters, who was interviewed by a local publication as part of its coverage on the protest, was later indicted in a kidnapping plot against Governor Gretchen Whitmer.

=== Lansing and East Lansing ===
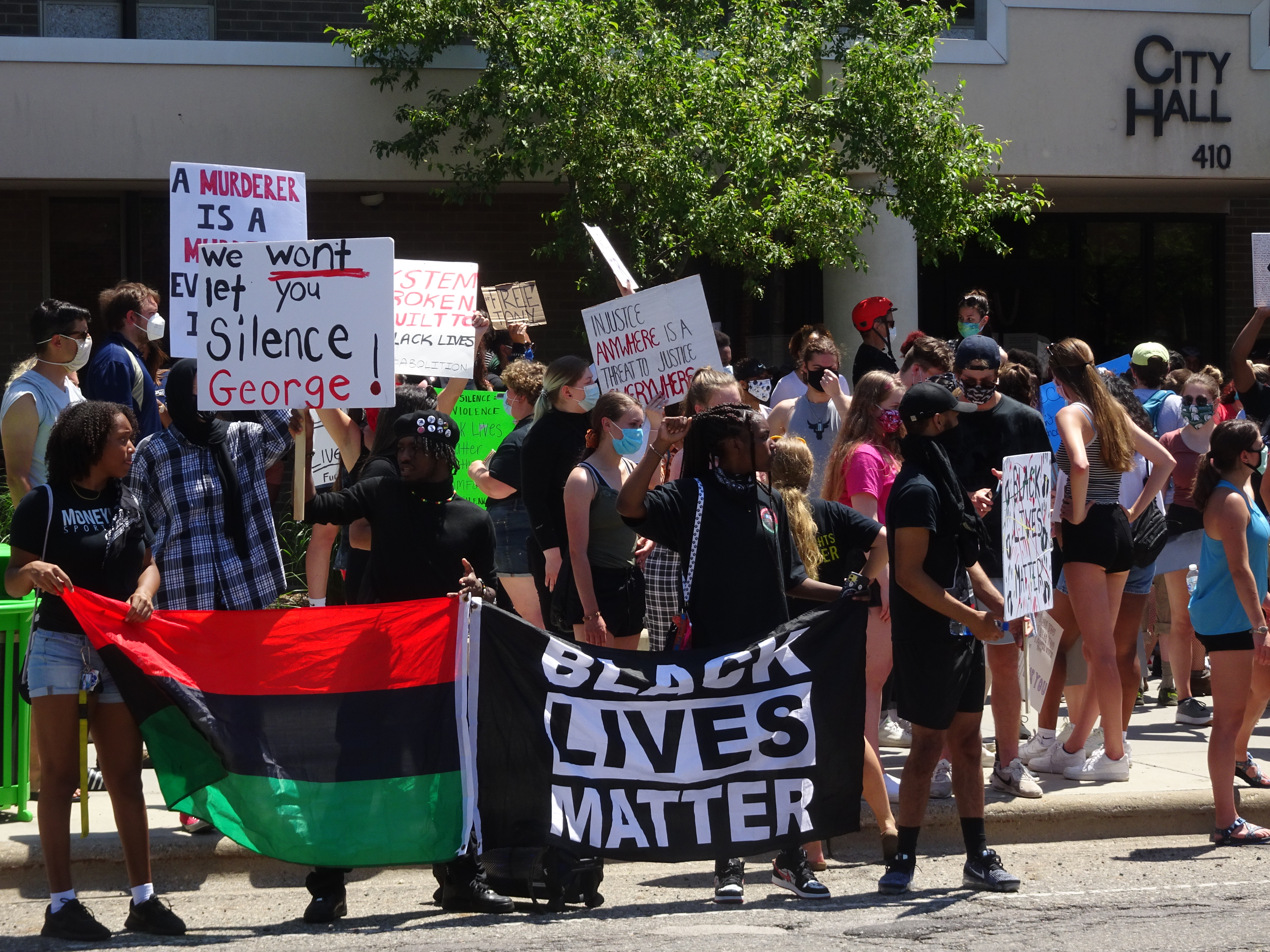
Protesters in East Lansing on June 2

Several thousand people gathered at the Michigan State Capitol in Lansing on May 31. About a thousand of them marched south from the Capitol, and the east to East Lansing where they protested outside the East Lansing Police Department. About 100 protesters then returned to downtown Lansing. As tensions rose in Lansing, the city enacted a curfew which remained in effect until 5:00 am on June 1. On June 2 a group of about 250 gathered at the East Lansing City Hall to protest the murder of George Floyd and two separate incidents where a white East Lansing police officer was accused of using excessive force against black men. On June 6, protesters called on Lansing mayor Andy Schor to resign "over inaction on police abuses".

=== Lincoln Park and Allen Park ===
On June 4, about 600 protesters started marching from Lincoln Park up 4 miles along Southfield Road to Allen Park, stopping at the Lincoln Park police department and Allen Park police department along the way. The two organizers of the event, Cindy Michel and Tia Alvarado, worked with local law enforcement to ensure the proceedings were peaceful. Debbie Dingell, the U.S. representative for Michigan's 12th congressional district, was also in attendance, stating that she supported good police officers but would not support police officers that did not treat people equally.

=== Marquette ===
A number of protesters gathered outside Marquette's post office on May 29. On May 30, a protest march started at Northern Michigan University and proceeded towards the city's downtown; a protester briefly stood on the hood of a city police SUV, but no arrests were reported. On May 31, over 150 people took part in another protest that covered 20 blocks and ended at a county sheriff's office. On June 1, about 200 protesters marched on the streets to peacefully protest against racial injustice.

=== Midland ===
Over a thousand people held a protest on June 7.

=== Mount Pleasant ===
On May 31, crowds of about 200 people marched from Bluegrass Road and Mission Street in Mount Pleasant until they reached Broadway Street as part of a peaceful protest against racism and police brutality. Once there, protesters laid down before chanting "I can't breathe". On June 1, community members (including hundreds of students and faculty at Central Michigan University) participated in a peaceful protest. The protest started at Bovee University Center and ended at the Isabella County Sheriff's Office. Protesters chanted about the injustices they were condemning and their desire for justice and peace. The protesters had the full support of the university and coordinated with police prior to the protest, arranging for police escorts throughout the march.

=== Muskegon ===
On July 4, dozens of protesters assembled at Heritage Landing and marched through downtown Muskegon to protest the murder of George Floyd.

=== Pittsfield Township ===
On June 9, hundreds of protesters (estimates range from 500 to 1000) marched from the Washtenaw County's sheriff office in Pittsfield Township to the Arborland shopping center to demand justice for George Floyd and for Sha'Teina Grady El, a woman from nearby Ypsilanti Township that was caught on camera being hit 3 times by a deputy during an arrest the previous month. Prior to arriving at Arborland, the demonstrators stopped at the intersection of Washtenaw Avenue and Carpenter Road to kneel and chant "Say his name, George Floyd", "Breonna Taylor", and "No justice, no peace" as part of a march to emphatically denounce police brutality. The director of public safety at Pittsfield Township's police department, Matt Harshberger, and the department's public safety community coordinator, Ritchie Coleman, also participated in the kneeling. Organizers of the protest urged demonstrators to vote and helped people register to vote at a makeshift booth they had set up.

=== Port Huron ===
Hundreds of demonstrators showed up outside of the Municipal Office Complex on June 5 to protest the murder of George Floyd, racial injustice, and police brutality. The protesters gathered at Pine Grove Park and headed toward downtown Port Huron. The organizers made an effort to help unregistered voters to be able to vote in the upcoming 2020 presidential election.

=== Saginaw ===
On May 31, protesters began a 72-hour occupation of the area outside the Saginaw Police Department in a demonstration called "Stand with the Ghost of George Floyd." On June 2, the demonstrators marched from Hoyt Park to the Saginaw County Governmental Center building, blocking the Court Street Bridge in the process. They demanded reforms to law enforcement, which included de-militarization and mandatory mental illness and de-escalation training for police officers.

=== Sault Ste. Marie ===
On June 1, about 200 people protested on the corner of Ashmun and Portage in downtown Sault Ste. Marie.

=== Sterling Heights ===
On June 6, an estimated 5,000 to 10,000 peaceful protesters marched eastbound on Hall Road in Sterling Heights while chanting "Black Lives Matter", "Hands up, don't shoot", and "No justice, no peace". Sterling Heights' police chief Dale Dwojakowski stated that the protest went through four or five jurisdictions and no arrests were made; however, police refused to join protesters in kneeling. The protest was organized by three high school girls from Chippewa Valley High School who, along with Eastpointe Mayor Monique Owens, made sure to urge protesters to vote to ensure lasting change. The protest came in the aftermath of Shelby Township police chief Robert J. Shelide being placed on leave for inflammatory social media posts; he called for "body bags" for "vicious subhumans" involved in the nationwide protests over the murder of George Floyd by Minneapolis police officers. Protesters widely condemned his comments at the demonstration, though Dwojakowski declined to answer if he felt Shelide deserved to be fired for them.

=== Traverse City ===
On June 6, hundreds gathered in a peaceful protest in Traverse City to have open conversation on unity and racial inequality. The protest started with a nine-second moment of silence to commemorate the nine minutes that Minneapolis police officer Derek Chauvin spent murdering George Floyd by kneeling on his neck. Both organizers and law enforcement spoke on not being afraid to have conversations on race and not being silenced in fear of confrontation. Traverse City police chief Jeff O'Brien stated "I used to think there's no problem here, but there really is a problem. This issue really is our nation's original sin and we've got to get over that. We have to make sure that equality prevails." He went on to acknowledge that change would have to begin with law enforcement officers holding each other accountable to eliminate the origin of racial inequality and showing loyalty and commitment to the rule of law over loyalty to fellow officers. The protest started at Open Space Park and moved to Grandview Parkway. Speakers asked each demonstrator to support the cause with their vote for their city government.

=== Troy ===
On June 1, police blocked off traffic on Big Beaver Road as hundreds of protesters marched to the Troy police station while chanting "Black Lives Matter" and the names of people recently killed by police. The organizers of the march addressed the crowd, imploring them to vote in the upcoming 2020 presidential election and to continue the momentum of the George Floyd protests as well as the Black Lives Matter movement as a whole. The march was peaceful, although Troy police announced via its Twitter account that a 68-year-old Troy man was charged with felonious assault for intentionally striking a protester with his car. The protester did not appear to sustain any injuries. On June 5, roughly 1500 demonstrators, including students from Troy High School, Troy Athens High School, and the International Academy East, marched from Troy Athens High School to City Hall to protest the murder of George Floyd by an ex-Minneapolis police officer and called for greater police reform. The mayor of Troy, Ethan Baker, stated the police department's use of force, training, hiring and community relations will be reviewed to determine if any policy changes would be necessary.

=== Warren ===
On June 2, more than 100 protesters led a peaceful march along Van Dyke Avenue in Warren to protest George Floyd's murder, racism, and police brutality. Protesters chanted "Black Lives Matter", "Say his name, George Floyd" and "I can't breathe" while marching as cars and bystanders cheered them on; police escorts and the city's mayor and police commissioner were also present. Warren's mayor Jim Fouts called the video of officer Derek Chauvin kneeling on Floyd's neck "shocking" and stated "If that happened in Warren, it would be unacceptable and the officers would be removed."

=== Ypsilanti ===
On May 28, about 100 protesters gathered at the Washtenaw County Sheriff's Office to protest the incarceration of Ypsilanti woman Sha'Teina Grady El after a police officer had been filmed punching her on May 26, the day after George Floyd's murder. These protests were closely linked to the protests in neighboring Ann Arbor that week. Protests continued in Ypsilanti over the subsequent week, with contention over the significant participation by Ypsilanti Police Chief Tony DeGiusti.

== Violence ==
=== Police violence ===
External videos
- Grand Rapids police pepper spraying a protester and then firing a tear gas canister at their head on YouTube

At a protest in Grand Rapids, a viral video showed Grand Rapids Police pepper spraying a protester and then immediately firing a tear gas canister into their head. The Grand Rapids Police Department announced on June 2 that they would conduct an internal investigation on the incident. At a June 2 protest in Grand Rapids, some water bottles were thrown at police, with police later shooting one man with a non-lethal projectile in the arm, chokeslamming one protester and then slammed the head of another protester against the road after they were arrested.

=== Protester property damage ===
Protesters in Detroit smashed police cruiser windows along Michigan Avenue in Corktown on May 29. A glass door at Lafayette Coney Island and windows at a federal building in downtown Detroit were smashed during protests on May 31.

More than 100 buildings were damaged in Grand Rapids on May 30 and 31, while fires were set to several cars. Grand Rapids Police created an internet portal to collect images of protesters, though K-pop fans spammed the website with music videos and other images to prevent the gathering of evidence.

Protests in Lansing resulted in thousands of dollars in damage on May 31.

== Government response ==
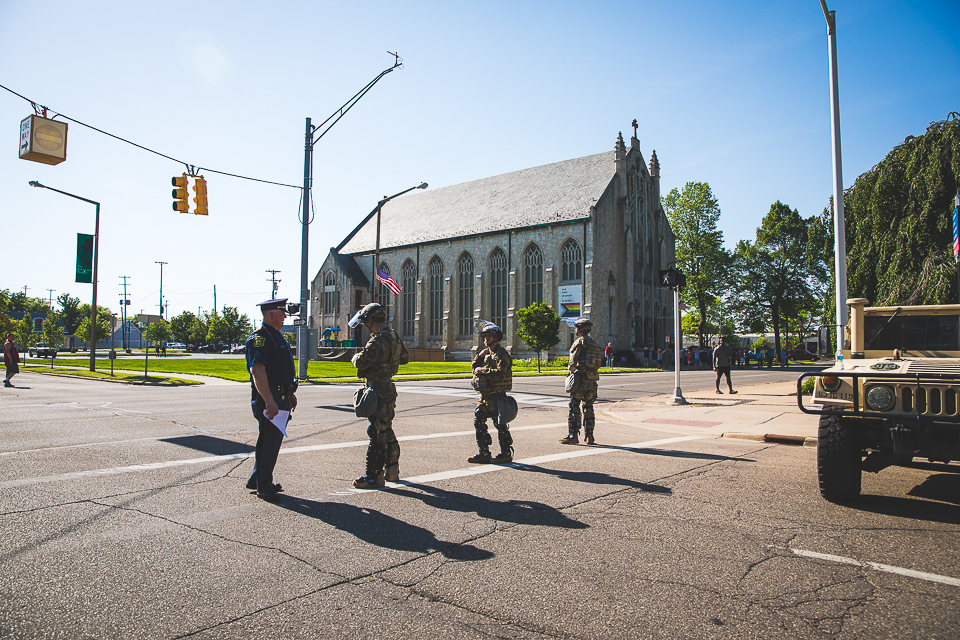
National Guard deployed in Kalamazoo on June 2

On May 28, State Senator Jeff Irwin introduced Senate Bill 945 which would require the addition of "implicit bias, de-escalation techniques, and mental health screening" as part of the Michigan Commission on Law Enforcement Standards certification process for new law enforcement officers. The bill was drafted before George Floyd's murder in response to the broader problem of police brutality. It passed the State Senate unanimously on June 4.

Governor of Michigan Gretchen Whitmer released a statement on June 1, writing "To those who have taken to the streets to peacefully protest the structural inequities Black Americans face every day – I’m with you. Tonight, I urge you to stay home and stay safe. Tomorrow, find a peaceful protest to join and make your voice heard" On June 3 she called for the passage of legislation to require de-escalation and implicit bias training for police officers, and the implementation of policies which would require them to intervene when they saw a colleague doing something "inappropriate or illegal".

Lynn Afendoulis, a Republican member of the Michigan House of Representatives representing the 73rd district in Grand Rapids, proposed a bill to punish those who participate rioting with terrorism charges up to a 20-year felony sentence in, with Afendoulis stating "We want prosecutors to be able to charge them as terrorists. As social terrorists".
