= 1911 Grand Rapids furniture workers' strike =

General strike

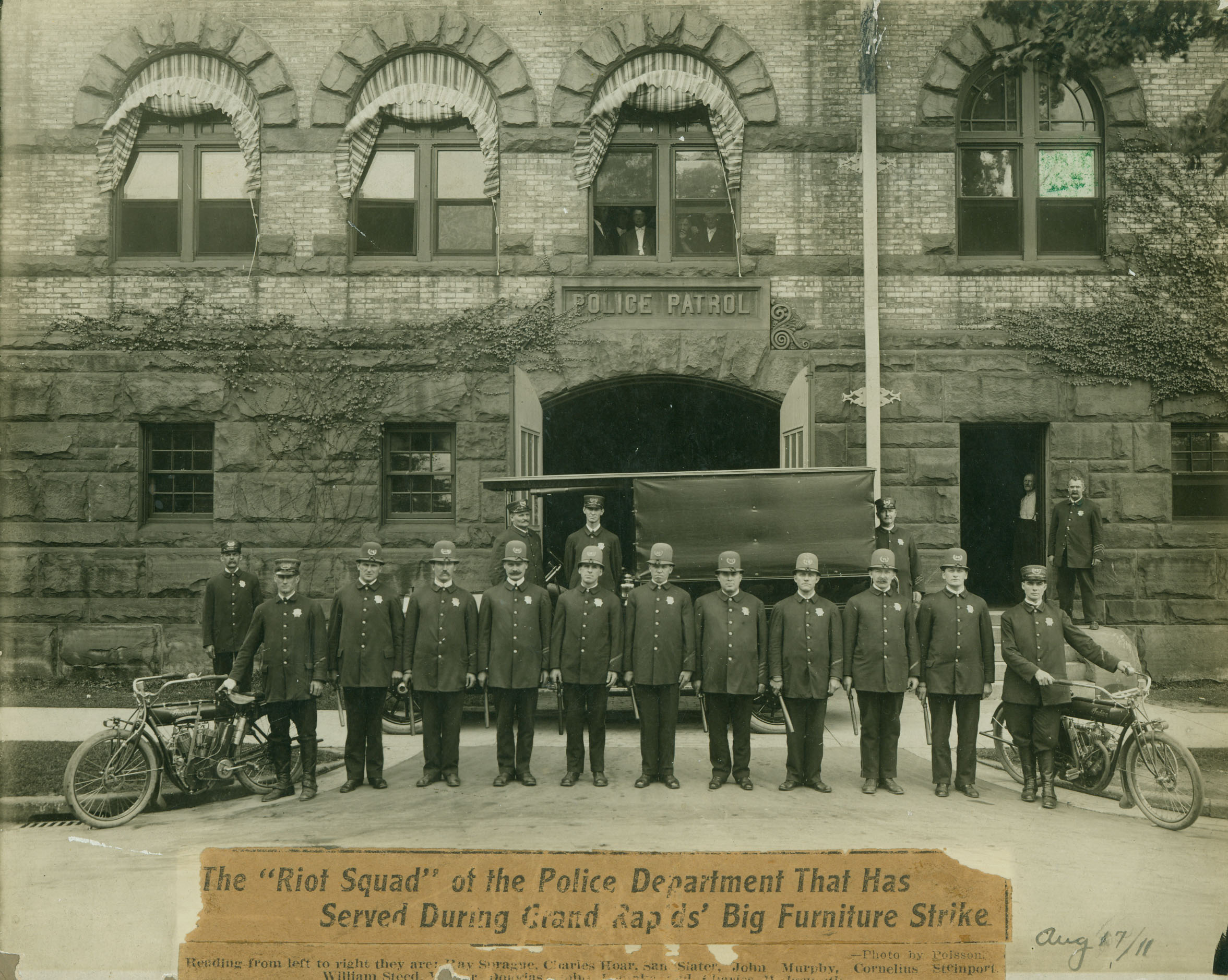
- Riot police of the Grand Rapids Police Department in 1911
- Date: April 19 – August 19, 1911 (121 days)
- Location: Grand Rapids, Michigan
- Goals: Increased wages; Revised work hours; Establishment collective bargaining
- Methods: Labor strike
- Result: Christian Reformed Church denounces strike; Strike ends unsuccessfully; Workers blacklisted by employers

Parties
| United Brotherhood of Carpenters and Joiners of America (UBCJ): Furniture workers; Other labor unions Support: Roman Catholic Diocese of Grand Rapids; Industrial Workers of the World | Furniture Manufacturers Association (FMA); Furniture Manufacturers Employers' Association (FMEA) Support: Christian Reformed Church; Fountain Street Church |

Lead figures
| William MacFarlane; Garrit Verburg; John Timmer; William Wenger Mayor George E. Ellis; Auxiliary Bishop Joseph Schrembs | Francis D. Campau Reverend Wesley Wishart |

Casualties
- Arrested: 25

The 1911 Grand Rapids furniture workers' strike was a general strike performed by furniture workers in Grand Rapids, Michigan, which was then a national leader of furniture production.

Furniture businessmen of Grand Rapids held control of the city's industry and banking sectors, growing so influential that they were able to price fix national furniture production. While Grand Rapids' economy grew, the wages of furniture laborers did not increase, with the city's furniture businesses collaborating on controlling their workers by establishing identical wages and creating an employee identification system that monitored political sympathies and productivity.

Displeased with their treatment by employers, workers demanded furniture companies to provide increased pay, lower work hours and the creation of collective bargaining between laborers and employers. After months of businesses refusing to meet with their workers, the strike began on April 19, 1911. It lasted for four months until leaders of the Christian Reformed Church – its Dutch American members comprised the majority of the labor movement – publicly denounced the efforts of workers, effectively ending the strike.

The strike resulted with city businesses becoming more direct in their political involvement, with companies placing their own representatives into public office and successfully lowering the number of city wards from twelve wards that accurately represented the city's various ethnicities to three wards that provided more voting power to the larger demographic of Dutch Americans. Some striking workers were blacklisted from jobs in Grand Rapids and thousands of others abandoned their jobs at factories, moving to regions that provided higher wages. The signing of the Clayton Antitrust Act of 1914 years later marked the beginning of the decline of Grand Rapids furniture industry as it forced revisions to the monopolies held by local furniture businesses.

== Background ==
=== Furniture City ===
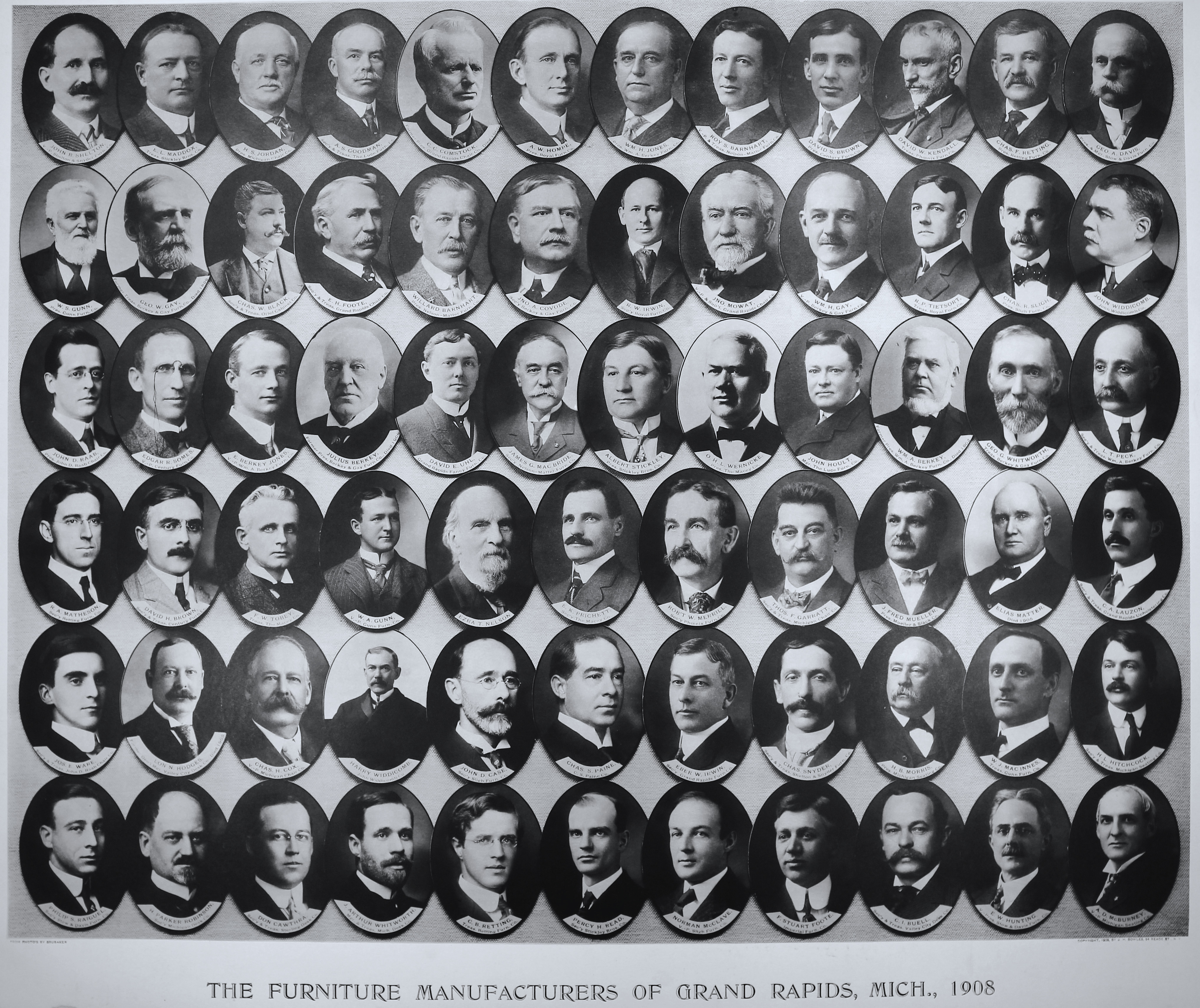
Photographs of the furniture businessmen of Grand Rapids in 1908

The furniture industry was instrumental in developing Grand Rapids, with the 1876 World’s Fair in Philadelphia boosting the city's furniture craftsmanship into the national spotlight and proving an opportunity for Grand Rapids to rebound from the Panic of 1873 economic crisis. Furniture manufacturing in the city then began to grow significantly; in 1870 there were eight factories employing 280 workers and by the time of the strike, the Old National Bank wrote that about 8,500 were employed by forty-seven factories.

At the end of the nineteenth century, business alliances in the United States experienced rising popularity in order to establish a monopoly for controlling the production of goods, with bankers and furniture manufacturers in Grand Rapids uniting in order to compete with larger cities and to monitor the cost of labor. The first of these alliances in Grand Rapids was the Furniture Manufacturers Association (FMA), established in 1881. That same year, the Peninsular Club was founded by wealthy citizens – including department store owners, attorneys and newspaper owners – alongside the most prominent furniture businessmen, who sought to control the city's banking industry. Half of the banks in Grand Rapids had furniture businessmen as their directors. Local businessmen then created a complex network to share insider information amongst each other about local factories and banks. The state of Grand Rapids' industry developed a parochialism solely focusing on the interests of furniture businessmen while ignoring wider economic implications, with one-in-three workers in Grand Rapids employed by furniture companies by 1890. The Grand Rapids' furniture businesses at the time were so influential that they were able to engage in price fixing the industry beginning in 1898, controlling thirty percent of the national market.

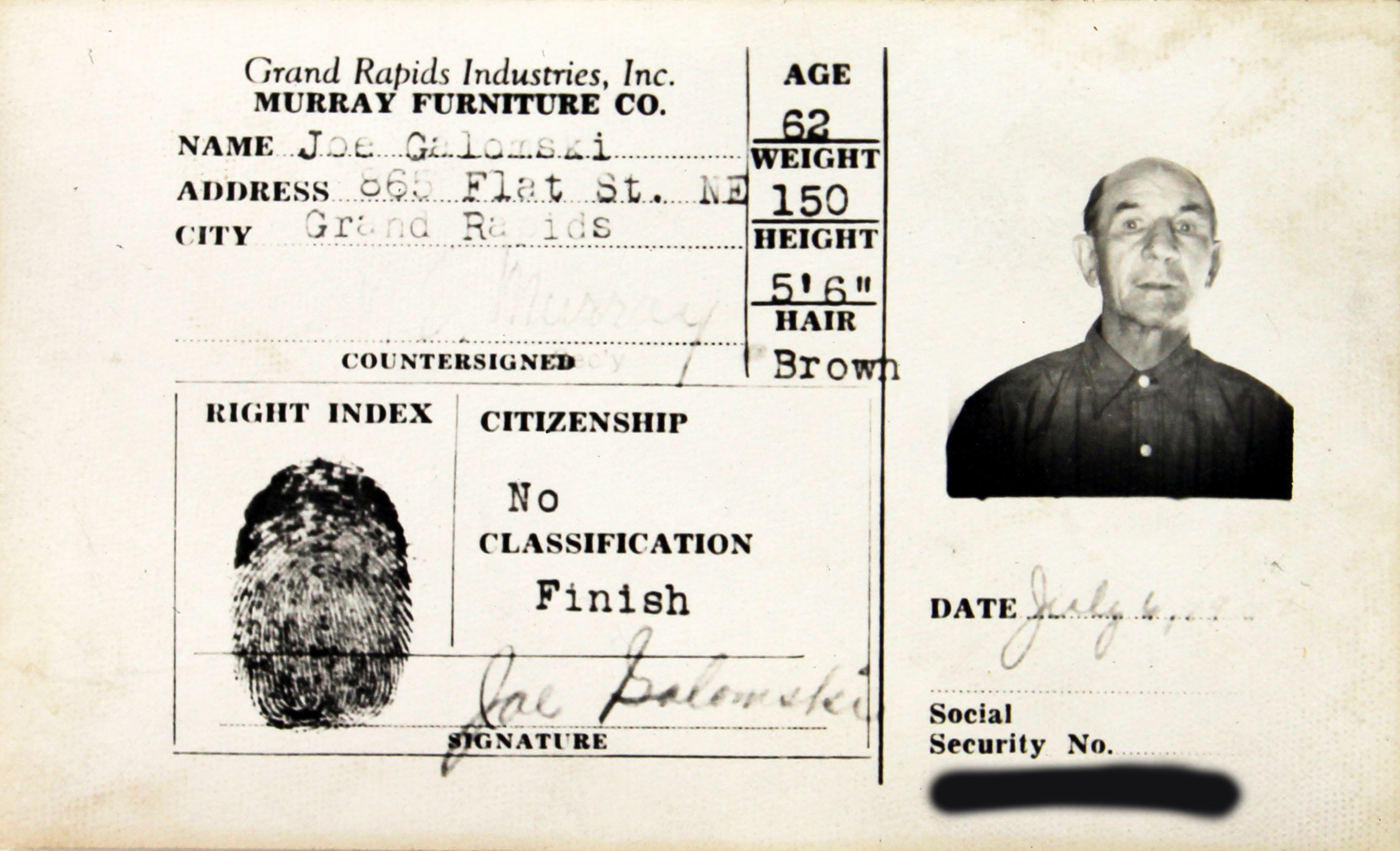
A card used to identify a Grand Rapids furniture worker

By the early twentieth century, Grand Rapids experienced some of the largest economic growth in the United States at the time; the city's value added by manufacturing was forty-second in the country, ahead of Atlanta, Denver, Omaha, Portland and Seattle. In 1905, the Furniture Manufacturers Employers' Association (FMEA) was created by the local furniture industry to monitor employees to determine if they were "competent or worthy" to be employed and to protect businesses from political and governmental "encroachments". The FMEA created cards for every employee in each furniture factory; the cards listed the worker's productivity, union-sympathies and wage.

Despite economic growth, governmental reports in 1907 revealed that while Grand Rapids led the furniture industry in product output, its furniture workers were paid lower wages compared to other areas despite the renowned quality of laborers. The groups of businesses collaborated to maintain low wages to discourage competition, with some skilled workers leaving their factories to work for other local businesses, only to be told by their new employer that they would not pay more than at the former factory. Similar complaints by employees would negatively affect their FMEA cards. Workers also required mortgage loans in order to afford ownership of basic homes near factories; furniture businessmen in contrast lived in opulent homes on the east side of the city and would receive income from their employees' home loans due to their positions in banking. Such disparities instituted a rat race sentiment among workers, further fueling discontent with their employers.

=== Disputes begin ===
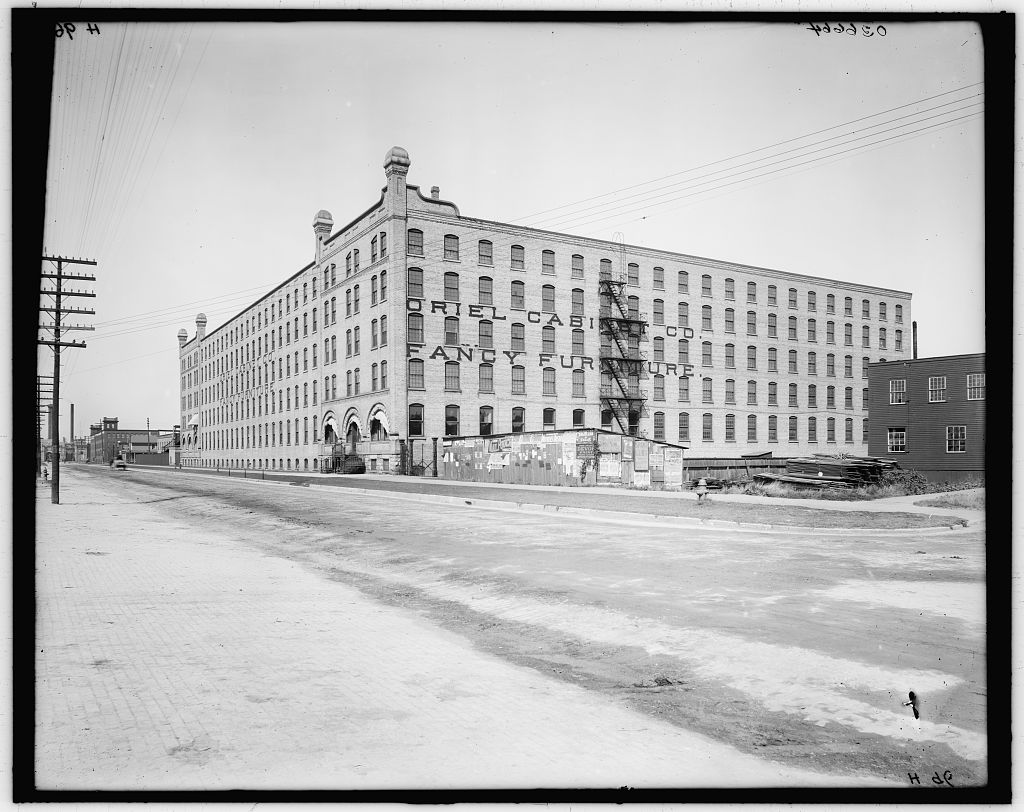
Oriel Furniture Company, where labor disputes first occurred

Labor disputes in Grand Rapids began in November 1909 when a committee of forty-five workers employed by the Oriel Furniture Company recognized that the company had experienced a ten percent increase in its sales, with the workers demanding an increase in pay. The leadership of Oriel told the committee to return in January 1910 at the end of the selling season and when the workers returned, the leader of the committee – who was employed for twenty-six years at Oriel – was fired on charges of "being an agitator", resulting in the workers temporarily deserting their jobs. The incident inspired other workers in different factories who became a charter of the United Brotherhood of Carpenters and Joiners of America (UBCJ), an affiliate of the American Federation of Labor. In July 1910, the UBCJ approached the FMA, demanding revised work hours and an increased wage, though their demands were ignored and the FMA said they would only negotiate with workers on an individual basis. In the fall of 1910, the UBCJ attempted to meet with the FMEA, but were immediately dismissed.

The UBCJ leadership sent letters to the FMEA on February 9, 1911, asking for a meeting to consider a ten percent wage increase, ten hours of pay for nine hours of labor and the institution of a minimum wage to replace the system of piece work used at the time. City leadership and the local media supported the meeting, though furniture businesses opposed any meetings with unions since they believed any encounter meant companies recognized organized labor groups. Such behavior by the businesses resulted with the majority of observers supporting the workers since the furniture companies resisted all opportunities for dialogue.

The FMEA responded with a letter dated March 1, 1911:

We understand that certain officials of an organized body of workmen of the city have expressed a wish to confer with us about the management of our business. We have always operated on an open shop basis; dealing with every man, union and non-union, without discrimination, on the basis of ability and individual agreement. From its organization this company has always recognized liberty of every man to sell his labor freely, independently and at the best price obtainable. This company will continue to conduct its business in these respects in the future as in the past.

Dissatisfied with the response of furniture companies, the UBCJ held a referendum on March 25, 1911, to vote for a labor strike; ninety-five percent of the 3,244 unionized workers voted to begin a strike on April 1. In the following days, the finishers union of 1,500 workers and the carvers union also voted in support of a strike. Mayor of Grand Rapids George E. Ellis, whose voter base comprised the working class in the city, supported the initiatives of the unions and helped organize the Commission of Inquiry in order to avoid a strike; the unions agreed to delay their strike and participate, though the businesses refused any discussions entirely. On April 18, workers gave one last chance of reply to the businesses; they received no answer.

== Strike ==
The strike began on April 19, 1911, at 9:00 am with over 6,000 workers refusing to go to work. Days later on April 22, the janitors at the city hall began a strike and entered the mayor's office, demanding a wage increase while detailing the difficulties they faced, causing Mayor Ellis to nearly faint. The first of few factories to abide by the demands of workers was Veit Manufacturing on April 24.

Businesses responded to the strike by using strikebreakers, hiring vagrants from Chicago and Ionia, with some of the strikebreakers arriving infected with smallpox. The board of aldermen in Grand Rapids condemned such practices, stating that importing workers "cannot but have serious effect upon the social conditions in this city, both because of the large number of unemployed which will result ... [a]nd the bringing in of men of questionable character." Furniture manufacturers were also aided by the American Home Furnishings Alliance, with furniture businesses agreeing to slow production so they would not outcompete Grand Rapids.

Bill Haywood of the Industrial Workers of the World temporarily visited Grand Rapids shortly after the strike began. Auxiliary Bishop Joseph Schrembs of the Roman Catholic Diocese of Grand Rapids expressed support for the striking workers on May 3, noting the deplorable conditions of their living and the low wages they received. Schrembs' congregation of mainly Polish Americans living on the west side of Grand Rapids were the lowest paid class and lived in an area that frequently flooded.

=== Widdicomb Plant riot ===
For days, women gathered near the Widdicomb Furniture Company plant on Fifth Street and Davis Street, with the Grand Rapids Police Department initially believing that they posed no threat of public disorder. On May 15, a riot of 2,000 people occurred during the closing hours of a demonstration in the evening near the plant. Five strikebreakers and factory owner Harry Widdicomb were leaving the plant by car when they were approached by Lithuanian and Polish women – some still holding their children – who initialized the confrontation, throwing stones at Widdicomb's automobile and destroying the vehicles window. Strikers and supporters then rushed the vehicle and began throwing any object at hand towards the occupants.

One police officer posted at the factory, Officer Sprague, approached the women, but was immediately attacked by them with stones. Sprague responded by drawing his weapon and firing in the air, temporarily dispersing the crowd and entered the plant with a detained man who attacked him. More officers arrived on the scene and struggled with holding on to detained individuals, eventually resorting to "use their clubs freely". John Kosc and Joseph Kotowski were "beaten insensible" by officers and then transported bloodied to the city jail. Officers then began to fire into the crowd, with police saying they possibly struck two individuals with gunfire. Rioters were also reported to have fired guns, but no gunshot injuries were reported among authorities.

Fire trucks then began to arrive on the scene and soon after, Mayor Ellis approached the demonstrators and praised their passionate actions, but ultimately called on them to return home. The crowd applauded the mayor, though they refused to leave; firefighters then turned their hoses on the crowd for thirty minutes, knocking many down into the street resulting with the riot's dispersal. In total, six were reported injured, four individuals were arrested and nearly all windows of the Widdicomb plant were destroyed. Two leaders of the fire department were also fired after turning their hoses on protesters, mainly women and children.

==== Response ====
In The Grand Rapids Herald the following day, Mayor Ellis called for one hundred citizens to join the police force, stating "The gathering of large crowds near factories must be discontinued. ... Remember, any person causing disorder is the worst enemy the laboring man has." Brigadier general of the Michigan National Guard Perley L. Abbey observed the riot while on a train to Ludington and discussed deploying troops from other regions of the state.

The UBCJ responded to the riot saying they would remove any members involved in violence and stated they "deeply deplore all acts of violence and if in any way we can avoid such actions we will gladly assist the authorities in so doing".

Days after the riot, American Seating agreed on May 26 to provide its workers ten hours of pay for nine hours of labor.

=== Opposition from churches ===
The Christian Reformed Church and Fountain Street Church were the main organizations leading opposition to the strikes. The furniture factory businessmen, who lived in nearby mansions in the Heritage Hill neighborhood, attended Fountain Street Church and fearing a loss of contributions from the wealthy members, Reverend Alfred W. Wishart expressed disapproval of the strike.

On July 15, in one of the last events during the strike, a parade of 3,000 strikers marched through the main streets of Grand Rapids after Mayor Ellis approved of the event.

Weeks later on August 9, the Christian Reformed Church's seventeen churches condemned union membership, arguing that nowhere in the organization did it call for the interests of serving God. According to Erdmans, this was the "death blow" for the strike as the majority of workers were Dutch and belonged to the Christian Reformed Church. On August 18, workers voted three to one on returning to work and on August 19, the strike officially ended.

== Aftermath and legacy ==
The strike ultimately did not achieve its objectives and the event resulted in lasting changes to the structure of labor and governance in Grand Rapids. Some workers who were involved with the strike were allegedly blacklisted by factories, prohibiting these workers from obtaining jobs. Thousands of workers then decided to abandon their jobs in Grand Rapids and sought to continue their careers in regions where they were provided more compensation. Following the signing of the Clayton Antitrust Act of 1914 into law, furniture businesses in Grand Rapids faced financial crisis as they were intertwined with local banks, beginning their trajectory of decline.

Before the strike, furniture businesses in the city resisted any economic and political changes that negatively affected their interests in subtle approaches, but after the labor movement grew, local businessmen began to establish power through a formal route of municipal office-holders. Businesses were upset with Mayor Ellis for supporting the strike, so they successfully lobbied for the city to change from a twelve-ward government – which more accurately represented the city's ethnic groups – to a three ward system in 1916 that placed more power into the demands of Dutch citizens. Since 1916, the proposal to increase the number of wards occurred in the 1950s and the 1970s, though they were ultimately unsuccessful. In 2020, the city's Task Force on Elected Representation proposed establishing four wards with two representatives after being approached by the groups Empower the Citizens and GR Democracy Initiative.

=== Spirit of Solidarity ===
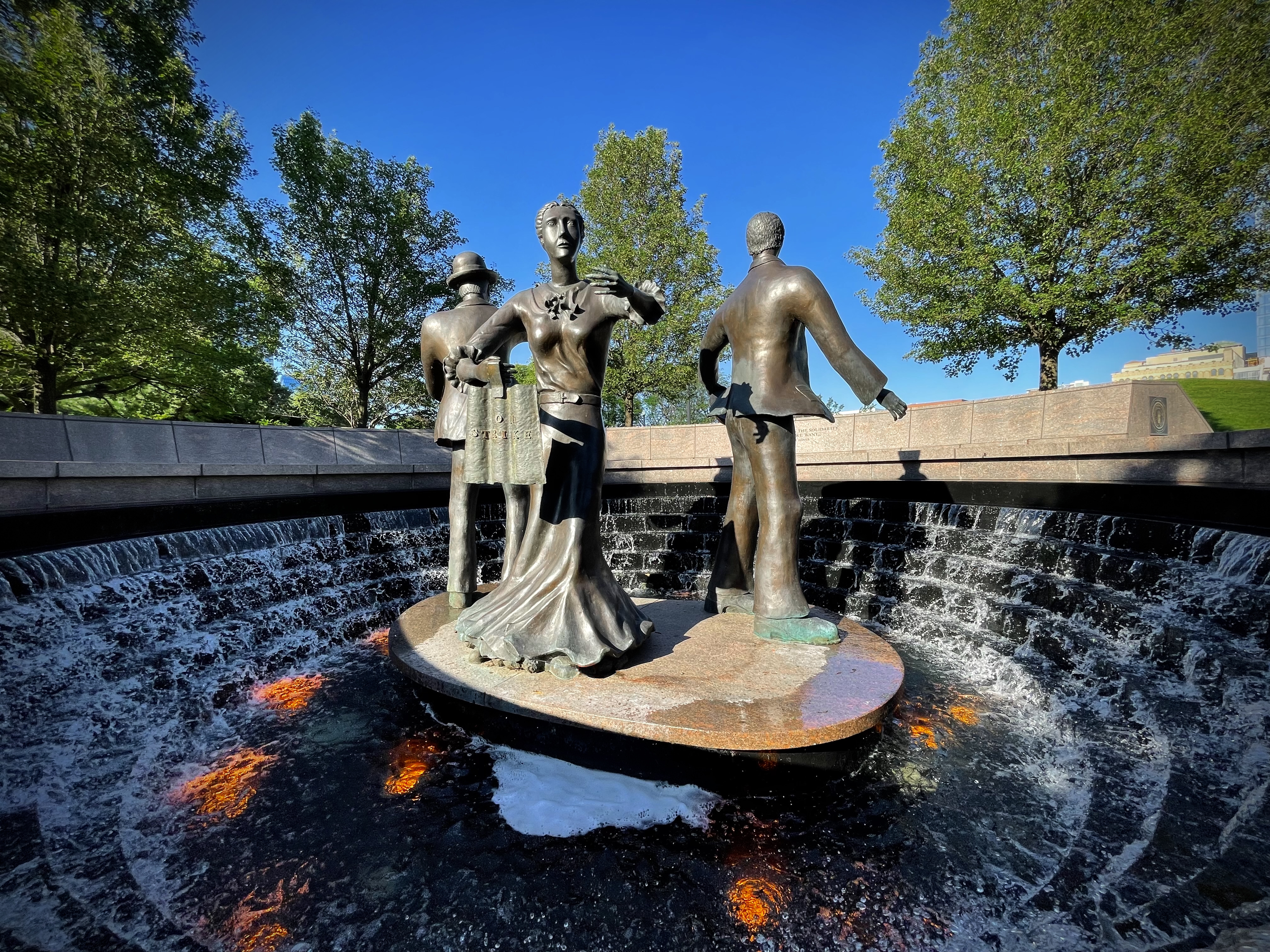
Spirit of Solidarity memorial commemorating the 1911 strike

A $1.3 million memorial designed by Robert Chenlo titled the Spirit of Solidarity was unveiled on April 19, 2007, in commemoration of the 1911 strike's anniversary. The Spirit of Solidarity was initially proposed by citizens of the West Side in the 1980s, though funding for the material and logistical work for the statue's location required years to finalize. Since the work's dedication, the memorial has been the site for labor demonstrations in the Grand Rapids area.
