= Killing of Patrick Lyoya =

2022 police killing in Michigan

- Frame from witness video, showing Schurr on top of Lyoya moments after the shooting
- Date: April 4, 2022; 4 years ago
- Time: c. 8:16 a.m. (EDT)
- Location: Grand Rapids, Michigan, United States
- Type: Homicide by shooting, police killing
- Perpetrator: Christopher Schurr
- Deaths: 1 (Lyoya)
- Charges: Second-degree murder (dropped following mistrial)
- Verdict: Mistrial

On April 4, 2022, Patrick Lyoya, a 26-year-old resident of Grand Rapids, Michigan, United States, was fatally shot by Officer Christopher Schurr of the Grand Rapids Police Department during a scuffle between the two. After Lyoya began to flee the scene, Schurr attempted to detain him, and unsuccessfully fired a taser at Lyoya. Lyoya attempted to disarm Officer Schurr of the weapon and was successful in disarming him. Officer Schurr then discharged one round from his firearm into the back of Lyoya’s head.

As news of the shooting and videos of the incident were released, public protests occurred to denounce the officer's actions, to demand the reform of the GRPD, and for the recusal of the prosecutor handling the case due to alleged conflicts of interest. Per protocol, investigations of the shooting were performed by a non-involved entity, with the Michigan State Police assuming responsibility. On June 9, 2022, Schurr was charged with second-degree murder, alleging that the death was intentional and not justified as self-defense, facing up to life in prison with the possibility of parole if convicted. Schurr's trial began on April 28, 2025. On May 8, the presiding judge declared a mistrial after the jury was unable to reach a verdict following four days of deliberations. On May 22, Kent County prosecutor Chris Becker announced that he would not retry Schurr.

== Parties involved ==
=== Patrick Lyoya ===
Patrick Lyoya, an ethnic Fuliru, was a refugee from the Bafuliiru Chiefdom of the Democratic Republic of the Congo, a nation experiencing unrest fueled by repeated foreign intervention since the overthrow and execution of Patrice Lumumba, which was organized by Belgium and the Central Intelligence Agency, that led to the Congo Crisis and subsequent conflicts. According to Lyoya's family, they fled eastern Congo after experiencing years of violence in the Kivu conflict. Lyoya's parents sold beer and clothing for money; his mother was once raped by rebels on her way home. The Lyoya family moved to Malawi in 2003 and Lyoya spent half of his life living in a bamboo house at a refugee camp. In 2014, the family received asylum in the United States, with Tanzanian scholar Godfrey Mwakikagile writing "Ironically, Lyoya and his family fled the region and sought refuge in the very same country that has played a major role in the disruption ... in eastern Congo". Lyoya often assisted fellow refugees who were establishing themselves in the Grand Rapids area. While in the United States Lyoya had a difficult time establishing himself; he did not yet speak the English language proficiently, he switched homes frequently, and he changed blue-collar jobs multiple times. He had also been arrested for drunk driving several times and was ordered to be assessed for substance use disorder, with Lyoya telling his friends that he was trying to improve his life. He had two children and had been living in Grand Rapids for about five years prior to the incident.

=== Christopher Schurr ===
Mugshot of Christopher Schurr on June 9, 2022

The officer identified as shooting Lyoya is Christopher Schurr, who received a criminal justice degree from Siena Heights University in May 2014. According to The New York Times, former teammates from Schurr's college track team recounted that he was strict with rules and was easily angered, with some peers questioning whether such a temper would be suitable for a career in law enforcement. Schurr also participated in Christian missionary trips in which he assisted people in Africa. Joining the GRPD in 2015, Schurr received multiple commendations by police department leaders for performance of his duties. A 2017 review of his performance resulted with multiple officers praising Schurr. Grand Rapids Police Chief Eric Winstrom initially did not identify Schurr saying that the department would only release the officer's identity if criminal charges are filed, resulting with protests demanding the release of the officer's name. Schurr, per protocol, was placed on paid administrative leave and his police powers were suspended pending an investigation by the Michigan State Police. The name of the officer involved in the shooting was shared on April 25 by Chief Winstrom, who stated "In the interest of transparency, to reduce on-going speculation, and to avoid any further confusion, I am confirming the name already publicly circulating – Christopher Schurr – as the officer involved in the April 4 Officer-Involved Shooting. Beginning this week, as required by law, the Grand Rapids Police Department (GRPD) will be releasing documents in response to requests made under the Freedom of Information Act relative to this incident."

=== Grand Rapids Police Department ===
Police killings in Michigan had been occurring at an increasing rate in the years leading to the shooting and proposed legislation to reform policing practices were never enacted. At the same time, the Grand Rapids Police Department had faced criticism nationally for alleged police brutality prior to the incident and for incidents of officers drawing guns on people of color. In 2017, city data showed that black individuals were pulled over twice as much as non-black individuals. Since 2017, groups and civil rights activists had already been raising concerns about police brutality in Grand Rapids and called for better initiatives to bring better community relations between citizens and the police. The Michigan Department of Civil Rights received dozens of complaints regarding GRPD and calls to investigate possible racial discrimination used by the police department prior to the shooting. Investigations by the Michigan Department of Civil Rights began in 2019, though the department put investigations on hold citing a lack of resources and staff.

According to MLive, alleged incidents involving GRPD officers and people of color continued, with the news outlet listing events where a 12-year-old black girl was allegedly handcuffed, two Latinos boys were approached at gunpoint and handcuffed as they were thought to be involved in a crime, and in September 2021 a black man was accidentally arrested at gunpoint preparing for the wake of his mother-in-law after matching the description of the suspect. The Hill wrote "the Grand Rapids Police Department has been involved with several other incidents involving alleged excessive use of force", detailing a 2021 event where a black 26-year-old man was punched repeatedly in the head by a GRPD officer during an alleged littering incident.

Following the incident, The New York Times reported:

Mr. Lyoya’s death was the latest in a series of incidents that have strained relations between residents and the Grand Rapids police. In 2017, officers searching for a middle-aged woman wanted for a stabbing instead handcuffed an 11-year-old girl at gunpoint while she was leaving a house. Those officers were not disciplined. Months prior, other Grand Rapids officers held five innocent teenagers at gunpoint. And in 2020, local outlets reported, an officer was suspended for two days after shooting a protester in the face with a gas canister.

The city responded to such incidents by hiring consultants and drew up plans to address concerns related to the behavior of its police department, including a youth interaction program for police. In 2018, consultant group 21st Century Policing Solutions provided recommendations and monitored police behavior, with MLive writing the group concluded GRPD "had much more work to be done". The city also initiated studies to evaluate the relationship of residents and the police. In 2020, City of Grand Rapids survey data revealed that black respondents held less trust in GRPD than white or Hispanic respondents. That same year, the GRPD outlined a plan, according to MLive, that included "making every patrol officer a community policing specialist, pilot a co-response of officers and mental health workers to specific incidents, enhance community communication, evaluate specific police technologies and more".

== Incident ==
External videos
- Cellphone footage of the incident on April 4, 2022 on YouTube

According to a Michigan State Police interview with Lyoya's passenger, the passenger and a friend woke Lyoya to ask him for a ride to downtown Grand Rapids. After dropping off the friend, the two purchased beer—the passenger said there were open containers in the vehicle—and the two discussed Lyoya starting a business for haircuts. Shortly after 8:00 a.m. EDT, a dashcam video shows Schurr, who was driving alone, passing a tan Nissan Altima driven by Lyoya in his patrol car, with the officer pulling into a home's driveway to turn around and follow Lyoya for a few residential blocks before pulling him over. Lyoya's passenger said that Lyoya was already pulling over as the vehicle was experiencing mechanical problems. Grand Rapids Police Department records show that Schurr called in the traffic stop at Griggs Street SE and Nelson Avenue SE at 8:11 a.m. EDT.

At the time that Schurr pulled him over for having an improper vehicle registration—its license plates were registered to a different vehicle—Lyoya was on probation and his license had been revoked for a third time, most recently since March 20, 2022, following his third substance abuse conviction in 10 years. He also had three active warrants for his arrest: the first for a traffic accident on Christmas Day 2021 where Lyoya allegedly fled the scene; a second for failure to appear at a court hearing; and a third for domestic violence issued just three days before, after the mother of one of Lyoya's children accused him of punching her and smashing her face into a car in a dispute over bedsheets. It was later determined that Lyoya had a blood alcohol content of 0.29, more than triple the legal limit of 0.08.

Video recordings show Lyoya exiting his sedan, ignoring Schurr's shouted orders for him to remain in the vehicle, then asking the officer "What did I do wrong?" Lyoya initially appears confused when Schurr asks him for his driver's license, but then confirms he speaks English and tells the officer it's inside the car. Lyoya opens the driver's side door of his vehicle and stands there for about 30 seconds while he speaks to a passenger inside, but never reenters the car or retrieves a license. Lyoya then closes the car door again and begins to walk towards the hood of his vehicle, away from Schurr. Schurr attempts to grab Lyoya by the arm, who then runs away. At 8:13 a.m. EDT, Schurr calls for backup, then pursues Lyoya and a scuffle ensues. Schurr tells Lyoya to "stop" and "stop resisting" several times, and at one point Lyoya replies "okay" as his hands are behind his back.

Schurr then pulls out his taser gun and aims it at Lyoya, who pushes it away from his body. With the officer missing twice with the taser, the two can be seen grasping the weapon during the incident, with Lyoya attempting to push the taser gun to the ground away from himself. During the scuffle, Lyoya tells Schurr "Stop what you are doing, please" while the passenger of the car can be heard telling the officer "Stop. You don't have to do all of that; you can talk to him". The struggle for Schurr's Taser lasts about 90 seconds, and ends with Lyoya facing prone on the ground and Schurr atop him, his chest pressed against Lyoya's back. Schurr shouts for Lyoya to "drop the Taser" or "let go of the Taser" at least five times, and at approximately 8:16 a.m. EDT, Schurr draws his gun, presses it to the back of Lyoya's head, yells "Let go of the Taser" a final time, then shoots Lyoya. At 8:16 a.m. EDT, Schurr radioed in the shooting, including that a suspect was down.

Chief Winstrom subsequently confirmed that Lyoya was shot in the back of his head, that he was unaware of any weapons recovered other than Schurr's firearm and Taser, and that the police body camera had become deactivated as a result of the struggle. He also confirmed that Schurr's squad car was equipped with an automatic license-plate reader, but didn't know whether it had been deployed in making the stop, or if Schurr was aware of Lyoya's criminal history at the time of the shooting.

GRPD records include documentation of officers responding to the scene, with one officer writing that a witness said Lyoya had taken Schurr's Taser and stated "Your officer, he did all the right shit. ... He did everything he could do to deescalate the situation." The witness, who stated he was getting his phone from his home when the shot was fired, later stated he changed his opinion about the whether the shooting was justified after viewing video of the killing, stating Schurr "always had the upper hand".

== Investigations and criminal charges ==
Following the shooting, the Michigan State Police (MSP) opened an investigation into the circumstances surrounding Lyoya's death. Multiple videos of the incident, from a police dashcam, a police body camera, a video doorbell and the cell phone of Lyoya's passenger in the vehicle, were released during a press conference by Chief Winstrom on April 13. The investigations conducted by the MSP then go to Kent County Prosecutor Chris Becker, who will decide whether or not to charge the officer. Becker stated following the release of videos that "[w]hile the videos released today are important evidence, they are not all evidence" and chose not to immediately press charges against the officer, waiting for investigations to conclude.

After the official autopsy had been performed but before its results were released, the Lyoya family hired Dr. Werner Spitz to perform a second, independent autopsy. Spitz reported that Lyoya was killed by a single gunshot from a gun pressed to the back of his skull. During a press conference on April 19, attorney Benjamin Crump highlighted Spitz's finding that, prior to his death, Lyoya had a predicted life expectancy of 82 and could have lived a "long and fruitful life". Released on May 6, the official report from Kent County Medical Examiner Stephen Cohle agreed with the cause of death, adding that no other injuries or diseases were present and that Lyoya had died with a blood alcohol content of 0.29%, more than three times the legal drunk-driving limit of 0.08%.

=== Calls for recusal of prosecutor ===
Kent County Prosecutor Chris Becker stated following the release of videos that "[w]hile the videos released today are important evidence, they are not all evidence", with Kent County officials waiting for an investigation to complete before deciding whether to press charges against the officer. After it was discovered that the local police union donated funds to Becker's campaign as the Republican candidate for county prosecutor elections in 2016, some in the community called for Becker to recuse himself from the investigation of the shooting. County commissioner Robert S. Womack described the funding of Becker as a "conflict of interest", though attorneys representing the family of Lyoya said that none existed, instead arguing that biases of local prosecutors favoring police exists everywhere due to their frequent collaborations. Over 50 Grand Rapids area spiritual leaders also demanded the recusal of Becker. Becker refused to recuse himself from determining if charges should be brought against the officer, saying that he did not have a relationship with Lyoya or Schurr, though the prosecutor called on others for guidance on the case. Legal scholar Mark Osler stated that Becker's refusal to recuse himself was "one of the problems with these cases handled locally" and that "[t]here can be real wisdom in removing any determination from the local actor who's going to be working with the police on a continuing basis".

=== Kent County charges ===
On June 9, 2022, Kent County Prosecutor Chris Becker filed a charge of second-degree murder – alleging that the death was intentional and not committed in self-defense – against Officer Christopher Schurr, who killed Patrick Lyoya, with Becker stating "This is not a message. This is just based on the facts and making a decision in this case ... I think it’s a fact of the world: police officers aren’t above the law". Becker shared that he did not believe manslaughter charges were applicable as there was no "heat of passion" apparent in Schurr's actions and that he did not put forth firearms charges due to a Michigan Supreme Court ruling in 1991 prohibiting such charges for active duty officers. According to Becker, he said he would operate the prosecution against Schurr himself. Schurr then turned himself in to authorities in Battle Creek, about 65 miles from Grand Rapids, and was held in Calhoun County Jail.

==== Response to charges ====
According to Professor Mark Dotson of the Western Michigan University Cooley Law School, Becker's charges were "significant on a number of different levels", further stating "With the significance of the charge comes a heavy burden on the prosecutor, ... I’m sure he’s confident enough in getting a conviction, otherwise he would not have brought these charges. ... I think there is sufficient evidence to support the second-degree charge and I think he should be able to carry that burden if it eventually goes to trial". The same day charges were filed, Chief Winstrom of GRPD demanded the City Manager of Grand Rapids to immediately suspend the pay of Schurr while pending the officer's firing from the department. Schurr was fired from the Grand Rapids Police Department, effective on June 10, after he waived his right to a discharge hearing, according to City Manager Mark Washington. Michigan Attorney General Dana Nessel praised Becker's decision and the investigations performed by the Michigan State Police. Attorney Ben Crump representing the Lyoya family said the charges were "more than appropriate".

Schurr's attorneys Mark Dodge and Matthew Borgula stated that the incident "was not murder but an unfortunate tragedy, resulting from a highly volatile situation". The Grand Rapids chapter of the Fraternal Order of Police defended Schurr's actions, stating that the charges against him were a "ridiculous miscarriage of justice".

=== Preliminary hearing ===
A preliminary hearing to determine if Schurr should face trial for second-degree murder was held on October 27, 2022, with the hearing be held by Judge Nicholas S. Ayoub. In Michigan, the legal threshold for second-degree murder is low, with probable cause being sufficient for such charges. During the hearing, an engineer for Axon Enterprise said that the taser could have still been functional if pressed against someone and Sergeant Nicholas Calati of the GRPD stated that when police arrived on the scene, the taser was located near Lyoya's hands.

At a hearing on October 31, Judge Ayoub provided his judicial opinion that Schurr would face a jury trial for second-degree murder, stating that Schurr "knew he was pointing the gun and firing it at close range" at the back of Lyoya's head and that the trial should determine if Schurr's "actions were justified under the law." When stating the facts of the incident, Judge Ayoub said that Lyoya had control of the taser when Schurr shot him. Schurr challenged the decision, but the Michigan Court of Appeals and the Michigan Supreme Court both affirmed Judge Ayoub's ruling.

=== Trial ===
Christopher Schurr's trial began April 28, 2025. On May 8, 2025, Judge Mims declared a mistrial as a result of the jury being unable to reach a verdict following fours days of deliberation.

== Response ==
=== Lyoya family response ===
We are condemning Russian soldiers for shooting civilians in Ukraine in the back of the head, ... Why aren't we condemning police officers here in the United States of America shooting Black civilians in the back of the head? If it's wrong in Ukraine ... it's wrong in Grand Rapids, Michigan

— Benjamin Crump

Lyoya's family and their interpreter Pastor Israel Siku were later shown footage of the incident at an MSP office and reported that Patrick was killed "execution style", with Siku telling his congregation "I saw the video, I could not sleep ... The boy was on the floor, the cop as he lays on him, pulls up the gun and shoots him in the head and back up. Patrick did not move." Siku would also translate a statement from Lyoya's father, who said "I witnessed this thing in Africa. I never expected to see it happen in America." Lyoya's family demanded the immediate public release of footage related to the incident, an open autopsy, the identification of the officer and that a Swahili language translator be present when the family meets with authorities.

Attorney Benjamin Crump, who had worked with the families of Ahmaud Arbery, George Floyd and Breonna Taylor represented Lyoya's family, also demanded the prompt release of any recordings. In the re-enactment of the video from Lyoya's family's perspective, one man representing Lyoya is lying prone on the ground while the other man representing the officer kneels on the prone man's back while holding a finger gun gesture to the back of his head.

In Lansing, the Lyoya family held a vigil at the Epicenter of Worship. At the vigil, Pastor Sean Holland preached "For it was on Good Friday that a man named Jesus was illegally arrested and murdered at the hands of the state. But three days later, justice. There will be a resurrection, ... It is important that we name what happened. Our brother was murdered."

=== Police response ===
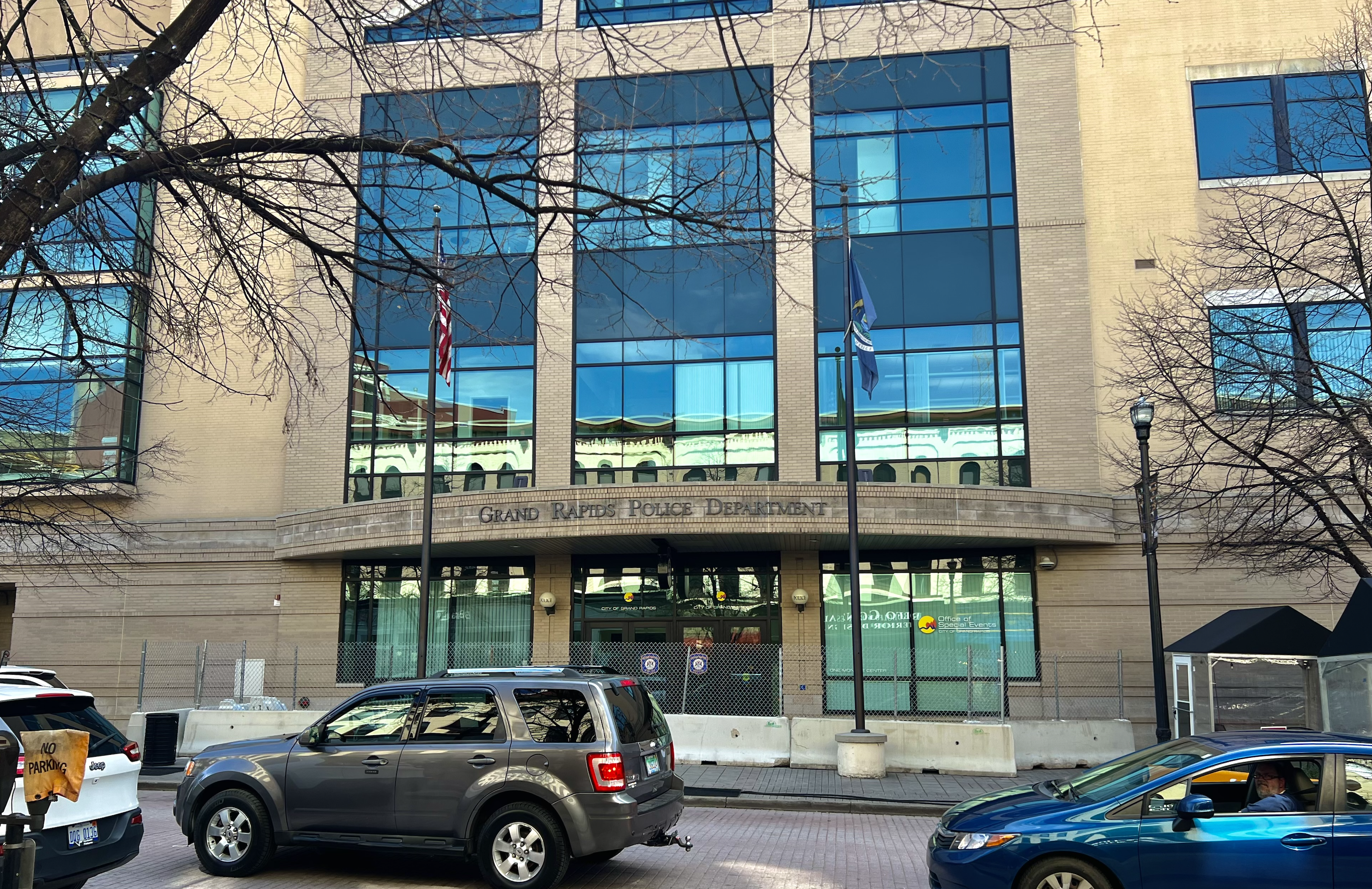
GRPD headquarters fortified on April 12 prior to video releases

On April 6, Kent County Commissioner Robert S. Womack stated "This was an execution. My career was threatened yesterday and today to be quiet." President of the Greater Grand Rapids NAACP Cle Jackson stated in a news conference shortly after the incident "We’ve constantly, constantly been talking about the harassment and the brutality that’s done right here". After the release of statements regarding Lyoya's death, the NAACP of Grand Rapids demanded the immediate release of the video on April 6.

On April 12, authorities announced that they would release mostly-uncensored videos from four different angles of Lyoya's killing the following day, saying that some images "may have been redacted/blurred to ensure privacy." Chief Winstrom stated that authorities would not release the identity of the officer involved in the shooting. Before the video was released, GRPD began to place barriers outside of their headquarters in preparation for demonstrations. Chief Winstrom described the incident as "a tragedy".

=== Organizations ===
On June 1, 2022, the Grand Rapids Association of Pastors presented a document signed by about 70 local pastors and spiritual leaders from multiple denominations announcing a "Call for Justice Sunday" to be held on Pentecost Sunday, June 5, writing "Yes, this is a time for anger. Our anger is appropriate, it is justified, and it is even holy, ... It is anger that comes from admitting that we have created, accepted, perpetuated a system that trains an officer to discern that his best choice in that moment was to reach for his gun and pull the trigger".

The Grand Rapids Association of Pastors listed the following demands:

- The recusal of Kent County Prosecutor Chris Becker
- Federal investigations of the incident and the behavior of the GRPD
- Public participation in GRPD union negotiations and ending the impunity of GRPD officers
- Increased funding and resources for the Grand Rapids Civilian Appeal Board and Office of Oversight and Public Accountability
- That GRPD respect the freedom of speech during public protests against the killing of Lyoya without implementing intimidation or violence against demonstrators

=== Public response ===
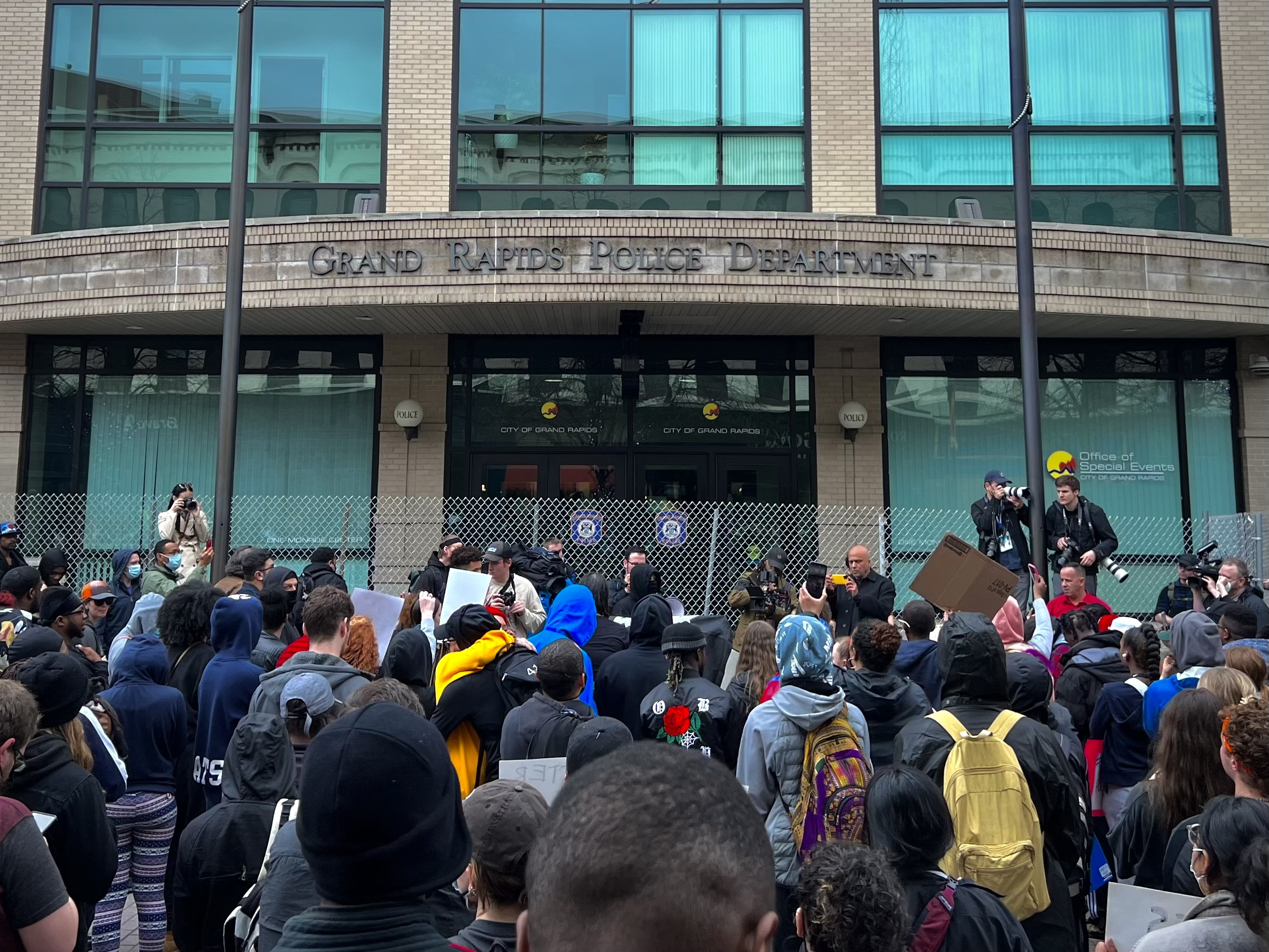
Protesters outside of the GRPD headquarters on April 13 following the release of videos showing Lyoya's killing

A march was held on April 9 in southeast Grand Rapids, with Siku gathering individuals to watch two men re-enact what was reportedly seen in the video. German newspaper Ludwigsburger Kreiszeitung wrote, "Deadly police operations of a similar nature are sadly regularly occurring in the USA", further explaining that the case is reminiscent of the murder of George Floyd. A Grand Rapids City Commission meeting was held on the evening of April 12 and more than 100 protesters organized by the Royal Black Panther Party Grand Rapids marched outside, with chants from the demonstrations being heard in the Council Chambers nine-stories up.

Residents of Grand Rapids responded to the release of the videos, with hundreds demonstrating in the downtown area and outside of the GRPD headquarters. Since the release of the video, protests occurred in Grand Rapids daily. Large protests organized by the Royal Black Panther Party also occurred on April 16, with hundreds marching throughout the city. Leaders of the march encouraged demonstrators to maintain peaceful, with some in the crowd carrying assault rifles and providing directions for the group. As the march approached Van Andel Arena, authorities blocked the area as there was a Kid Rock concert underway. The protest was overall peaceful without any physical altercations occurring, with marchers verbally confronting officers on occasion. After night fell, some protesters attempted to enter the Amway Grand Plaza Hotel around 9:00 p.m., though they were redirected and the march moved on. An hour later, the march finalized, though a small crowd gathered in Rosa Parks Circle to dance to music on a loudspeaker. In Portland, a march against the killing of Lyoya began in Peninsula Park at 9:00 p.m. PDT, with protesters in the Oregon city damaging "a coffee shop, two banks, and three bus shelters", according to KATU.

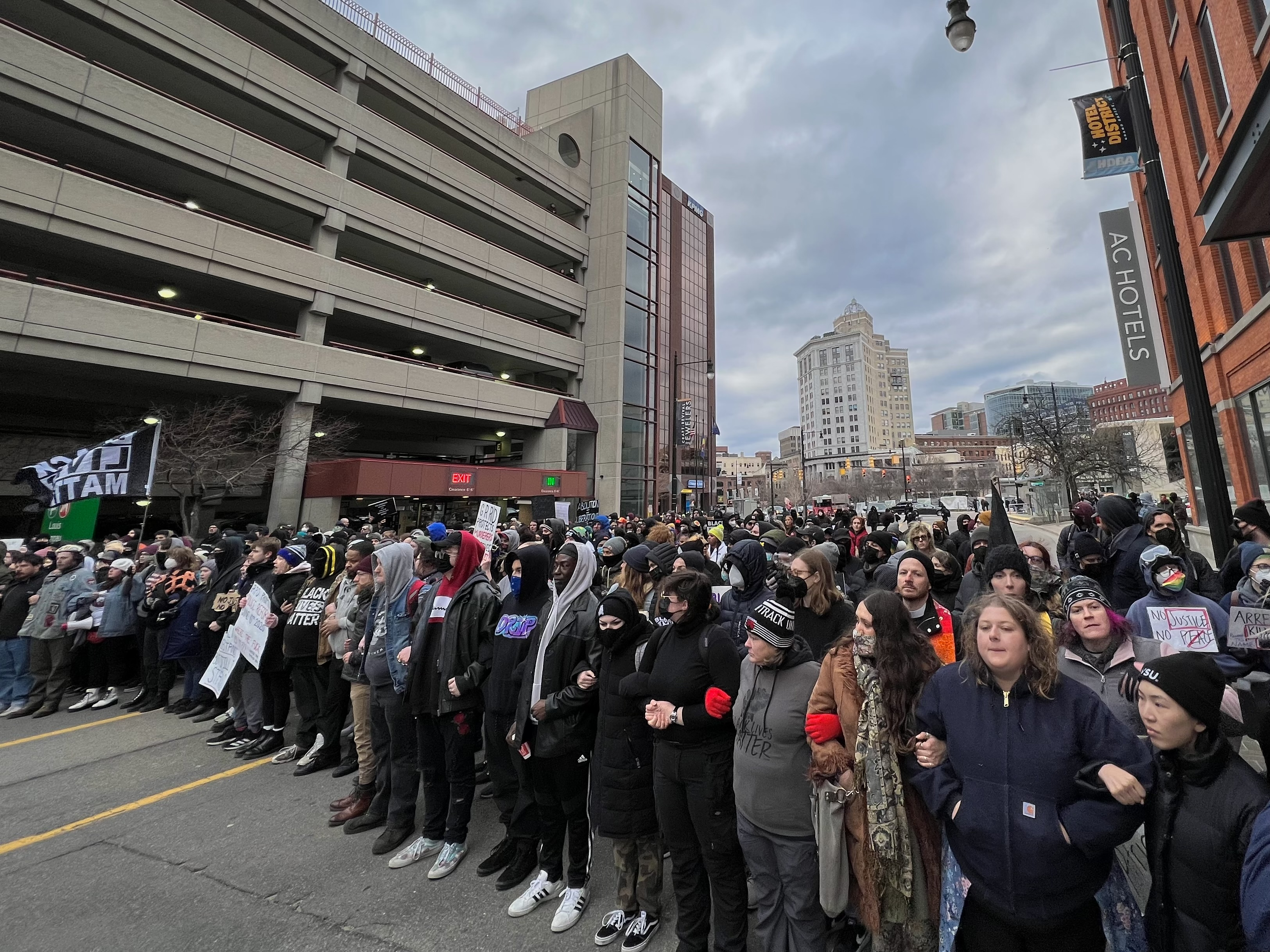
Demonstrators lock arms while marching on April 16

On April 22, the funeral for Lyoya was held at the Renaissance Church of God in Christ, attended by nearly 1,000 people, with many approaching his white casket draped with the flag of the Democratic Republic of the Congo to pay their respect. The eulogy was given by Reverend Al Sharpton, who began his speech noting that Lyoya's death coincided with the 54th anniversary of the assassination of Martin Luther King Jr. Sharpton demanded the release of the officer's name, citing how those in the general public accused of crimes have their background ridiculed while police are protected, also sharing concerns that if the officer was not charged they would remain unidentified. Later in the eulogy, Sharpton would go on to demand a federal investigation and made comparisons to the 2022 Russian invasion of Ukraine, stating "We stand with President Biden for those victims in Ukraine. ... but they shot a young boy in the United States, ... from Ukraine to Grand Rapids we must stand up for victims".

Two city commission meetings were adjourned due to the public entering and protesting; one meeting on April 26 and another on May 10. During the second meeting Mayor of Grand Rapids Rosalynn Bliss told visitors that those who caused disruptions would face misdemeanor charges, causing some observers to respond with shouting. Despite the mayor's statement, no arrests were made after the second meeting was cancelled, with Mayor Bliss responding to the incident stating it was a "disappointment" and that the public had to follow meeting rules.

=== Governmental ===
Governor of Michigan Gretchen Whitmer shared her sympathy with Lyoya's family and asked for any protests to be peaceful. Kent County Commissioner Womack stated at the meeting "We want to see more de-escalation, more training, but that's enough about the system cause everyone is going to be emotionally hurt when they see this...and the family is asking for peace, so I thank the young people who have been acting peacefully....We don't wanna see anymore people die." President of the United States Joe Biden invited Lyoya's family to the White House on May 25, 2022, to be present for the signing of the George Floyd executive order.

== See also ==
- Lists of killings by law enforcement officers in the United States
- List of unarmed African Americans killed by law enforcement officers in the United States
