= Grand Rapids Police Department =

Government organization

- Patch
- Abbreviation: GRPD
- Motto: "Professional, Progressive, and Responsive"

Agency overview
- Formed: 1871

Jurisdictional structure
- Operations jurisdiction: Grand Rapids, Michigan, United States
- Map of the Grand Rapids Police Department's jurisdiction.

Operational structure
- Headquarters: 1 Monroe Center NW; Grand Rapids MI
- Officers: 294
- Unsworn members: 104
- Agency executive: Joseph Trigg, Chief of Police

Website
- www.grandrapidsmi.gov/Government/Departments/Police-Department

The Grand Rapids Police Department is a municipal police department within Grand Rapids in the state of Michigan, United States.

== History ==
=== 19th century ===
Prior to the founding of the police department, the city used contracted individuals, with Henry Baker becoming the first watchman in 1856 who patrolled what is now downtown Grand Rapids. The Grand Rapids Police Department was established in 1871 with eight patrolmen operating under one chief. The police department originally operated under the direction of the mayor and city council, though a separate board of commissioners was created for police and fire department in 1881, initially creating conflict between city officials and the board.

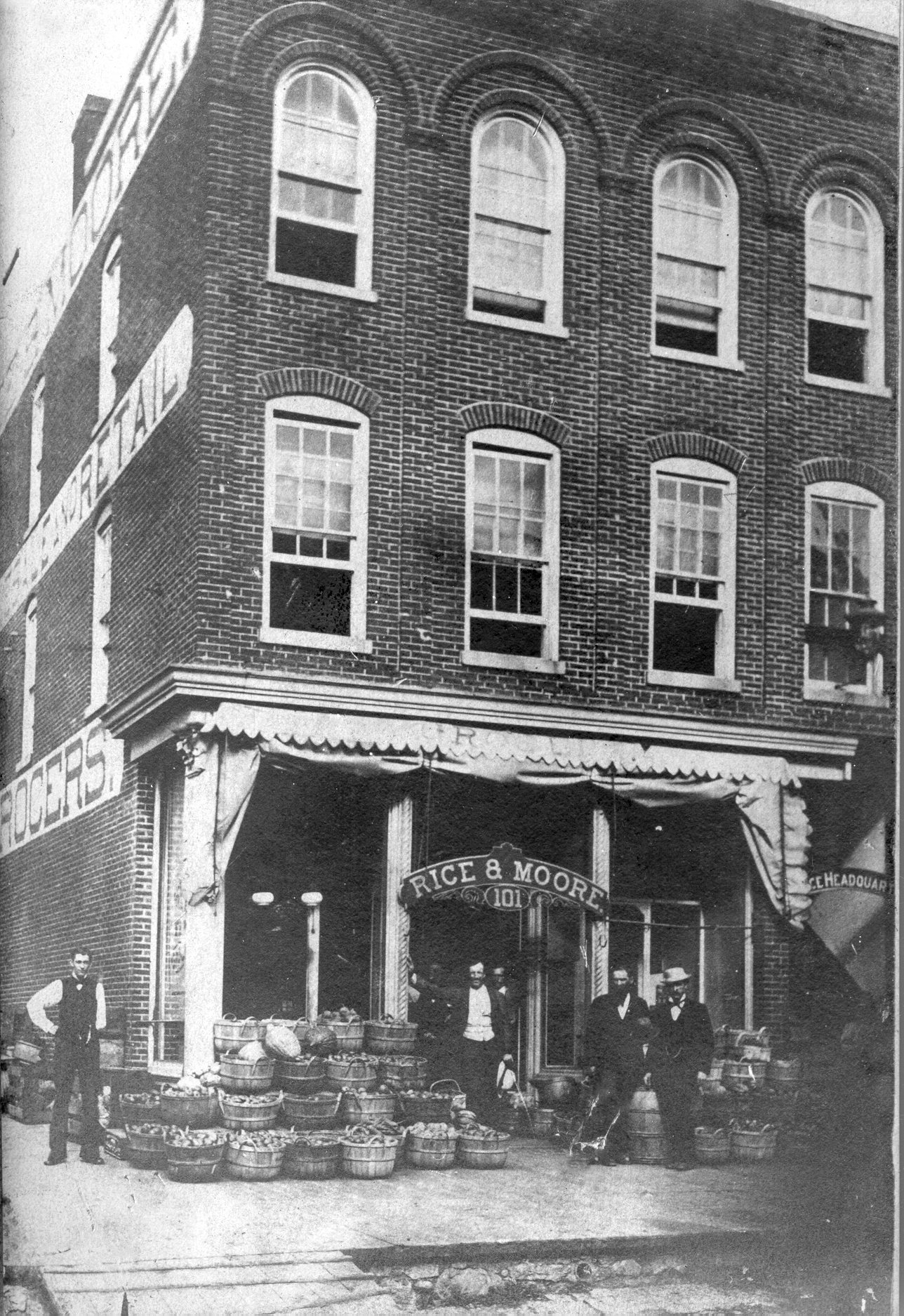
Original headquarters at 101 Monroe Ave

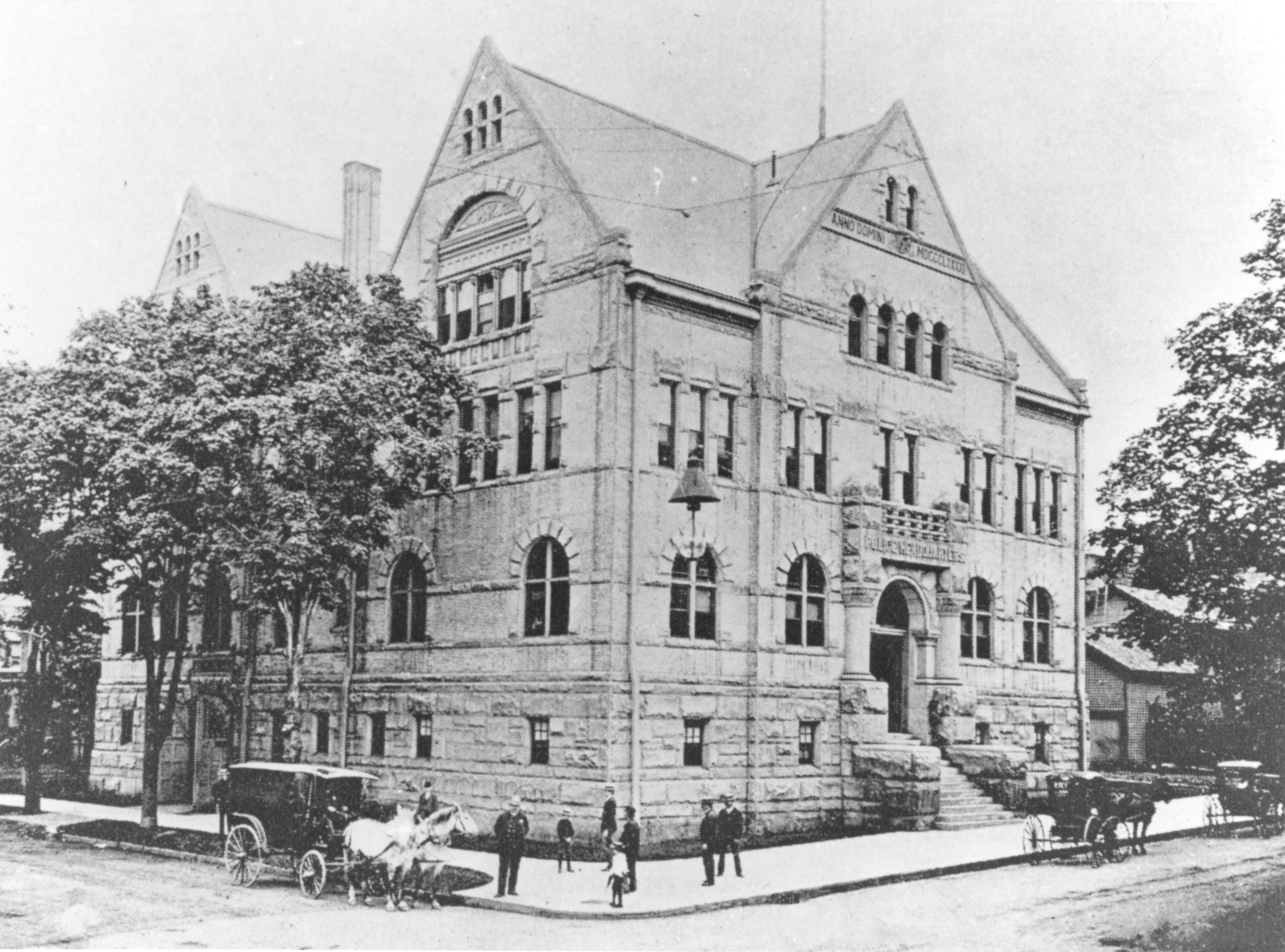
Headquarters at Crescent and Ottawa

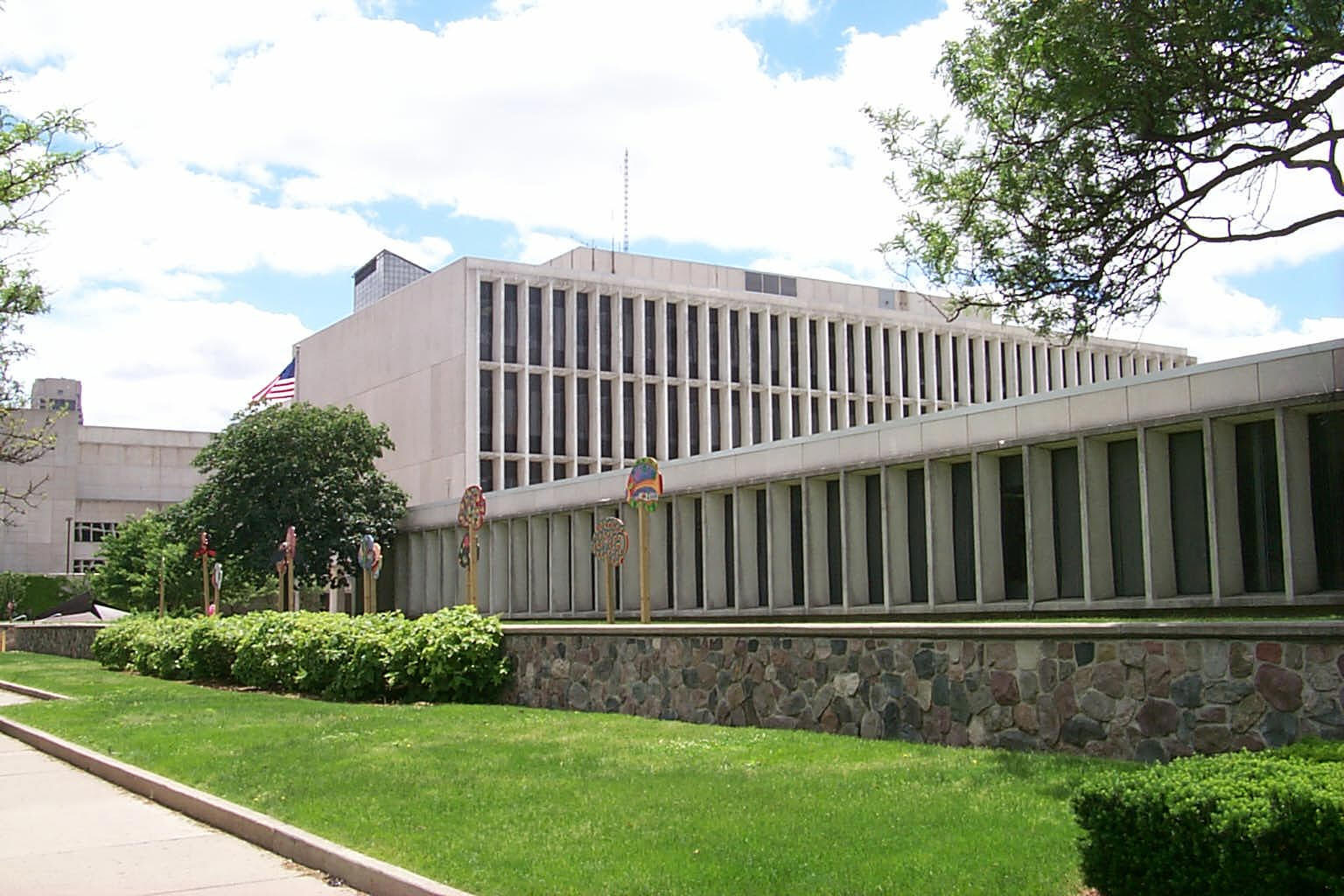
Grand Rapids Hall of Justice on Monroe Avenue

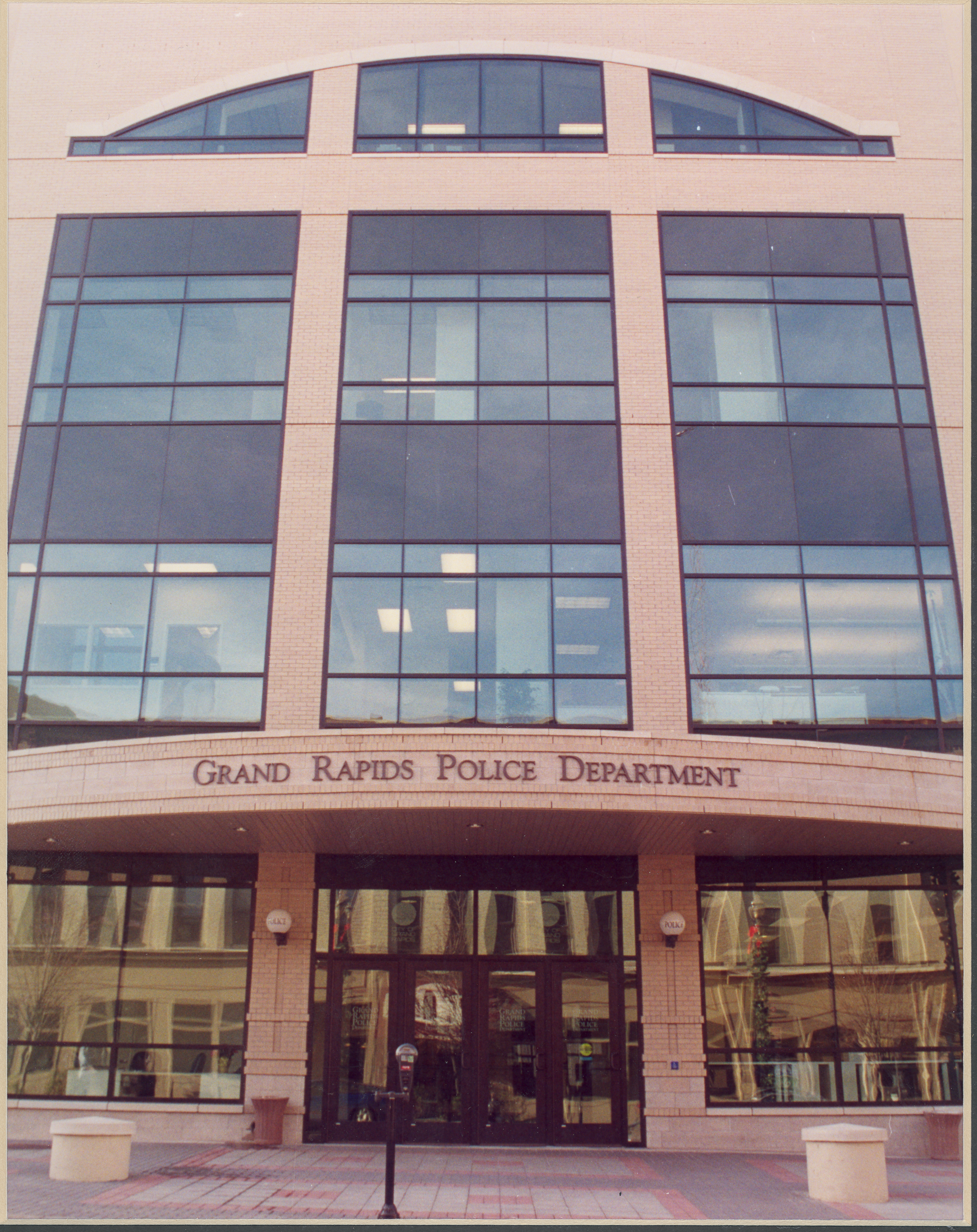
Current headquarters at 1 Monroe Center

To date, the GRPD headquarters has been in four different buildings; none of the previous sites remain standing today. The first police headquarters consisted of a two-room office suite located over the Rice & Moore grocer at 101 Monroe Avenue in downtown Grand Rapids. In 1882, the department moved to the intersection of Lyon and Campau and ten years later in 1892, a new headquarters was built at the intersection of Crescent and Ottawa designed by notable Detroit-based architect Elijah E. Meyers. The newly built headquarters had two cells, two jailer rooms and a boiler in the basement.

=== 20th century ===
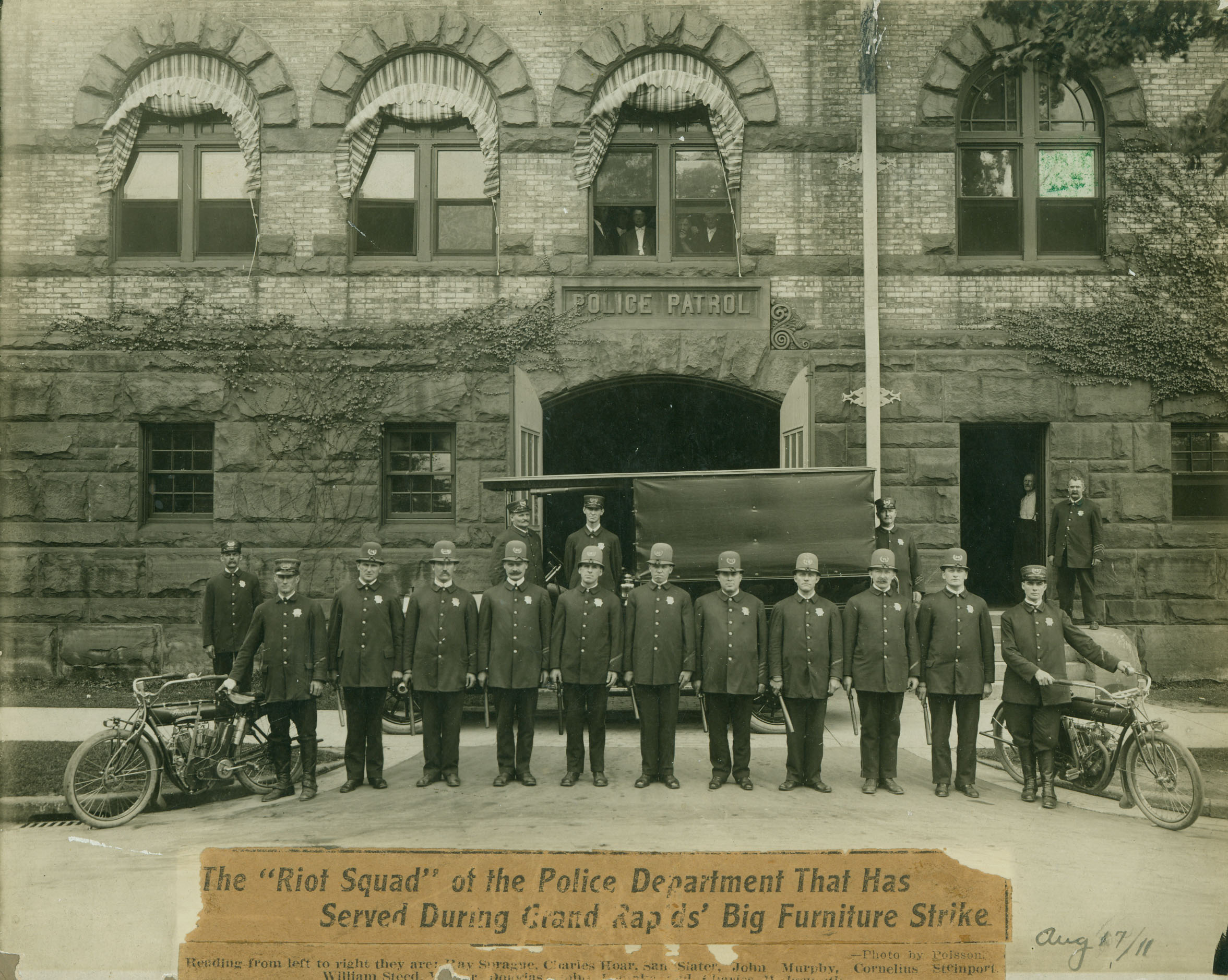
Riot police of the Grand Rapids Police Department in 1911

During the 1911 Grand Rapids furniture workers' strike, GRPD was involved in clashes during the Widdicomb Plant riot that saw officers fire into a crowd of protesters, though no gunshot injuries were reported. The Crescent and Ottawa police station was expanded in 1915. In 1928, the public safety James Sinke director was fired after he directed the psychiatrist Dr. Gustav A. Blumenthal to interview and perform phrenological procedures on officers, with Blumenthal charging the city $4,000, the equivalent to $60,287 in 2020. As the third headquarters was being torn down in 1965, old police records were also disposed of in the process.

In 1967, the department moved to the newly built Hall of Justice, located on the site of the present-day DeVos Place convention center on Monroe Avenue. That year the race riots of the long, hot summer of 1967 occurred, with police responding in July 1967 to riots in the African American community in the South Division area of Grand Rapids and armed white vigilantes who patrolled the streets.

=== 21st century ===
In 2001, the department moved into the current headquarters at a fifth location, a renovated Herpolsheimer's department store located at 1 Monroe Center NW. The GRPD faced increased controversy with the residents of Grand Rapids in the 2010s. Beginning in 2010, the GRPD watch commander's office telephone line, Line 3407, was labeled as "unrecorded", though it began recording the conversations of callers. In 2017, GRPD officers detained five teenagers innocent of any wrongdoing at gunpoint while later that year, officers handcuffed an 11-year-old girl at gunpoint without facing discipline.

In 2019, Eric Payne was named police chief, serving as the first African American leader of the department. The GRPD faced controversy in 2019 after Grand Rapids officials deleted recording from the Line 3407, with Senior Staff Attorney Miriam Aukerman of the American Civil Liberties Union stating "You’ve got to wonder what is so damaging that was on those recordings that the city had to destroy them over the weekend in order to keep the public from seeing them". Chief Payne oversaw the department during the COVID-19 pandemic and the George Floyd protests in Grand Rapids, when police were involved with clashes and responded to looting and fires. During the 2020 protests, an officer who shot a tear gas canister at the face of a protester received a two-day suspension. A year after the protests, Chief Payne would announce his retirement.

In March 2022, Eric Winstrom, a 20-year veteran of the Chicago Police Department was sworn in as police chief for GRPD. Shortly thereafter, GRPD faced widespread scrutiny following the April 2022 killing of Patrick Lyoya, with The New York Times writing "Mr. Lyoya’s death was the latest in a series of incidents that have strained relations between residents and the Grand Rapids police". In March 2026 Winstrom left to become Police Chief of the Pensacola Police Department.Winstrom was replaced on an interim and later permanent basis by longtime veteran of the GRPD, Joseph Trigg.

== Fallen officers ==
A total of fifteen GRPD officers have been killed since the department's first recorded death in 1895. The first killed was detective George Powers who was shot on August 22, 1895, while attempting to arrest train robbery suspects on a Grand Rapids and Indiana Railroad train at the city's Grand Trunk Western Railroad crossing. Fourteen of those officers died on-duty, while one was killed off-duty attempting to rescue an electrocution victim. Of those killed on-duty, eight were killed by gunfire and six were killed in traffic accidents.

== Equipment ==
=== Patrol vehicles ===
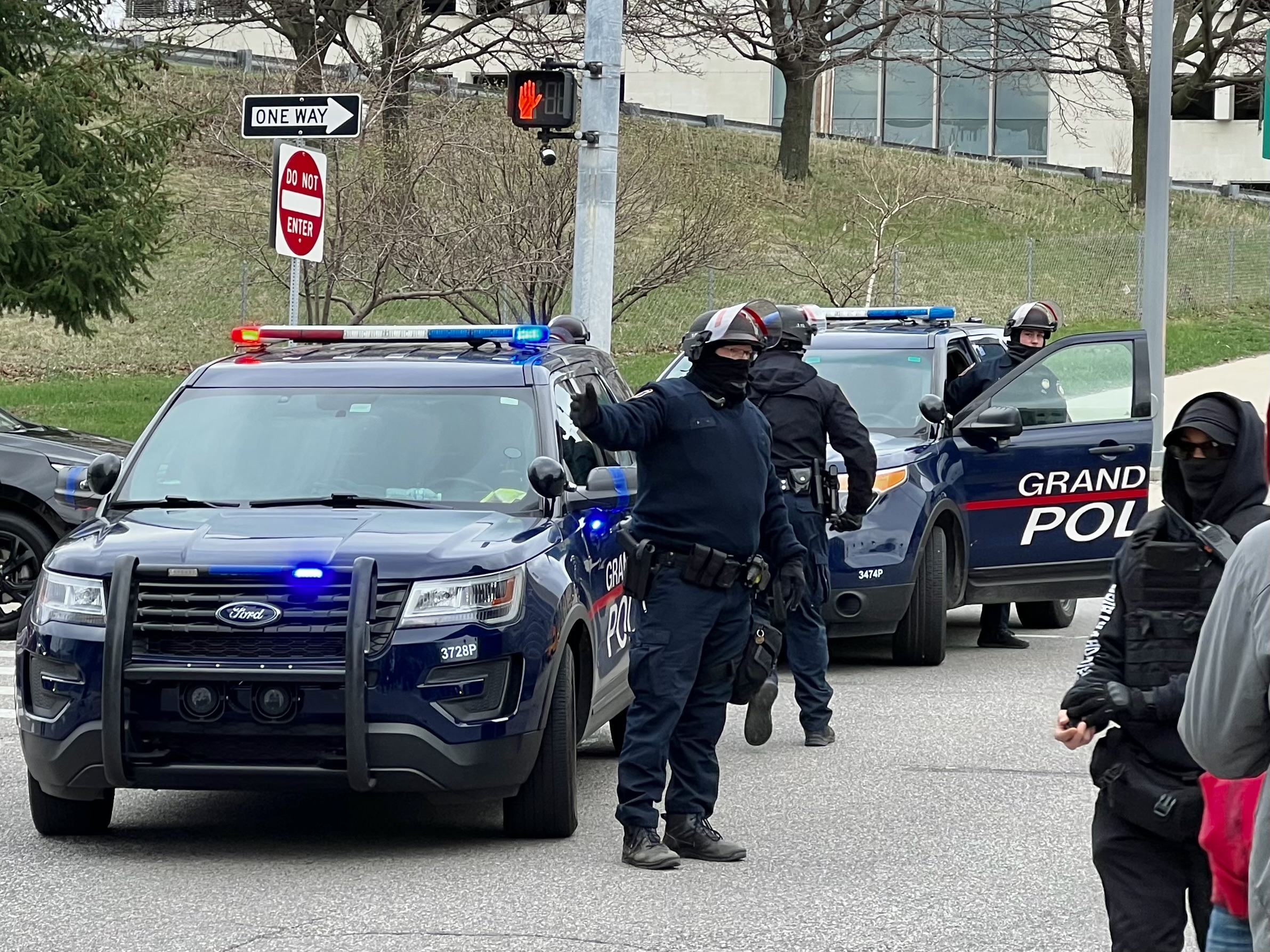
GRPD responding to protests against the killing of Patrick Lyoya

The GRPD utilizes the Ford Police Interceptor Utility SUV for marked patrol vehicles.

The department also utilizes a number of other platforms for specialized patrol functions, including bicycles, segways, and horses.

=== Firearms ===
The GRPD issues the 9mm Glock 17 as its primary service weapon. The department chose the Glock in 2014 as a replacement for the previously issued .40 caliber SIG Sauer P229 pistol.

In 2015, the department began deploying Colt M4 semi-automatic rifles in marked patrol vehicles to supplement the shotguns that were already carried.

=== Less-lethal ===
GRPD officers carry a number of less-lethal options, including pepper spray, collapsible batons, and tasers.

=== Body cameras ===
All GRPD uniformed patrol officers wear Axon 3 body cameras.
