= Rosa Parks Circle =

Plaza in Grand Rapids, Michigan

Coordinates: 42.96562°N 85.67159°W

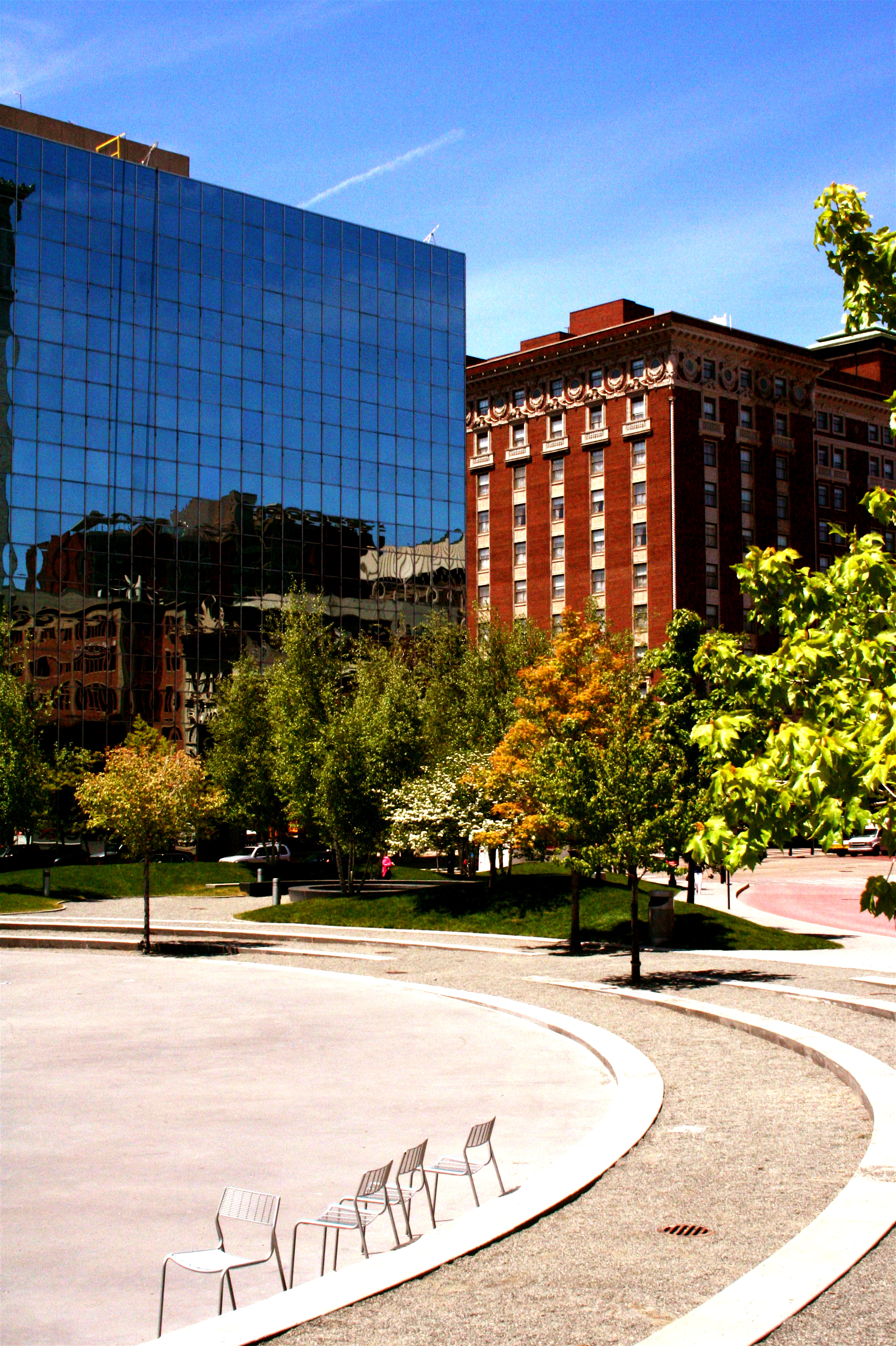
Rosa Parks Circle (2006)

Rosa Parks Circle is a plaza located in the heart of Grand Rapids, Michigan. During the warmer months it is a multipurpose facility, acting as a venue for events like concerts or dances put on by the Grand Rapids Original Swing Society (GROSS). In the winter the Circle is converted to an ice rink. Below the ice there are 166 fiber optic lights designed to represent the sky of Michigan as it appeared at midnight, January 1, 2000.

The area was designed by Maya Lin who is famous for her work on the Vietnam Veterans Memorial.

The original name of the circle was Monroe Mall Amphitheater. It is now named in honor of longtime Michigan resident Rosa Parks, of whom there is a statue in the park.

On August 7, 2012 Rosa Parks Circle was the location of a Guinness Book world record for the largest number of people swing dancing in unison (756 individuals) organized by the Grand Rapids Original Swing Society.
