= 2023 in Michigan =

- Decades: 2000s; 2010s; 2020s
- See also: History of Michigan; Historical outline of Michigan; List of years in Michigan; 2023 in the United States

This article reviews 2023 in Michigan, including the state's office holders, performance of sports teams, a chronology of the state's top news and sports stories, and a list of notable Michigan-related deaths.

== Top stories ==
The top news stories in Michigan included:

- The 2023 Michigan State University shooting on February 13 resulting in the deaths of three students and the shooter;
- The 2023 United Auto Workers strike from mid-September through the end of October, with the union targeting all three Detroit automakers at the same time, and including President Joe Biden's joining the picket line;
- Michigan prosecution of fake electors, 13 Republican officials who sought to award Michigan's Electoral College votes to Donald Trump in the 2020 presidential election in Michigan;
- The guity plea and sentencing of Ethan Crumbley in the Oxford High School shooting and the rejection of motions to dismiss charges against his parents, James and Jennifer Crumbley;
- The killing of Samantha Woll, the president of a downtown Detroit synagogue, stabbed to death at her home;
- Smoke from the 2023 Canadian wildfires blanketed the state in June and July; and
- Litigation against Michigan State University in connection with the Larry Nassar sex abuse scandal.

Top Michigan sports stories of 2023 included:

- The 2023 Michigan Wolverines football team going 15-0 and winning a national championship despite distractions from the University of Michigan football sign-stealing scandal and two suspensions of head coach Jim Harbaugh totaling six games;
- The 2023 Detroit Lions compiling a 12–5 record, winning the NFC North championship, and advancing to the NFC Championship Game where they lost to the San Francisco 49ers;
- The firing of Michigan State head football coach Mel Tucker amid allegations that he sexually harassed a rape victim;
- Miguel Cabrera's last game in Major League Baseball after 16 seasons with the Detroit Tigers; and
- Dwane Casey stepping down as coach of the Detroit Pistons following a 17–65 season and the hiring of Monty Williams to replace him.

Notable Michigan-related deaths in 2023 included former Detroit Tigers relief pitcher Willie Hernández; singer Sixto Rodriguez; actor Tom Sizemore; former Michigan State football coach Denny Stolz; Unabomber and former University of Michigan student Ted Kaczynski; Motown singer Barrett Strong; actress and Detroit native Piper Laurie; former Pistons shooting guard Chris Ford; former Lions center Ed Flanagan; and catcher/sports journalist Jim Price.

== Office holders ==
=== State government ===
- Governor: Gretchen Whitmer (D)
- Lieutenant Governor of Michigan: Garlin Gilchrist (D)
- Michigan Attorney General: Dana Nessel (D)
- Michigan Secretary of State: Jocelyn Benson (D)
- Speaker of the Michigan House of Representatives: Joe Tate (D)
- Majority Leader of the Michigan Senate: Winnie Brinks (R)
- Chief Justice, Michigan Supreme Court: Kyra Harris Bolden (D)

=== Mayors of major cities ===
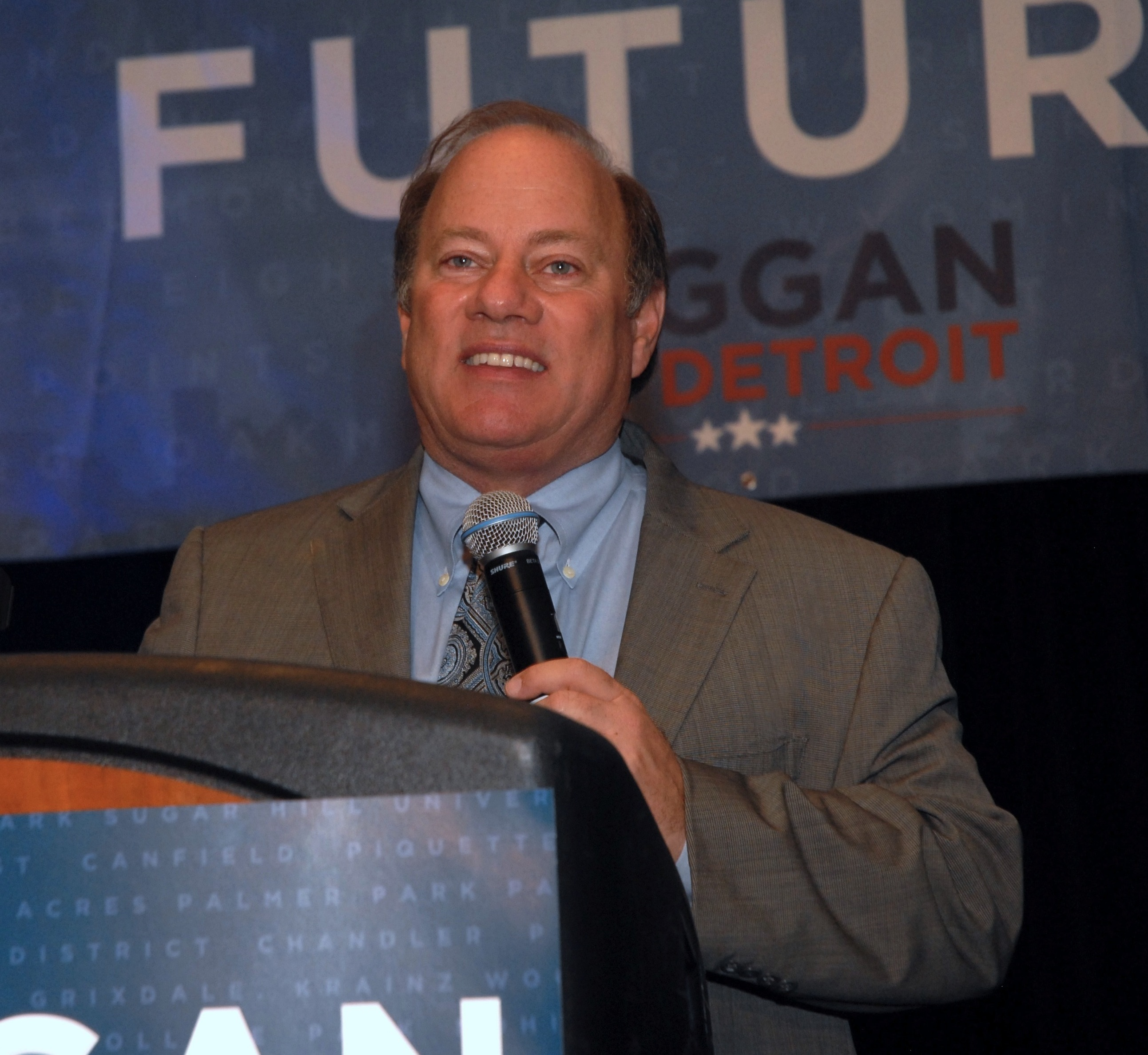
Mike Duggan

- Mayor of Detroit: Mike Duggan (Democrat)
- Mayor of Warren, Michigan: James R. Fouts/Lori Stone
- Mayor of Grand Rapids: Rosalynn Bliss
- Mayor of Sterling Heights, Michigan: Michael C. Taylor
- Mayor of Ann Arbor: Christopher Taylor (Democrat)
- Mayor of Dearborn: Abdullah Hammoud
- Mayor of Lansing: Andy Schor (Democrat)
- Mayor of Flint: Sheldon Neeley
- Mayor of Saginaw: Brenda Moore

=== Federal office holders ===
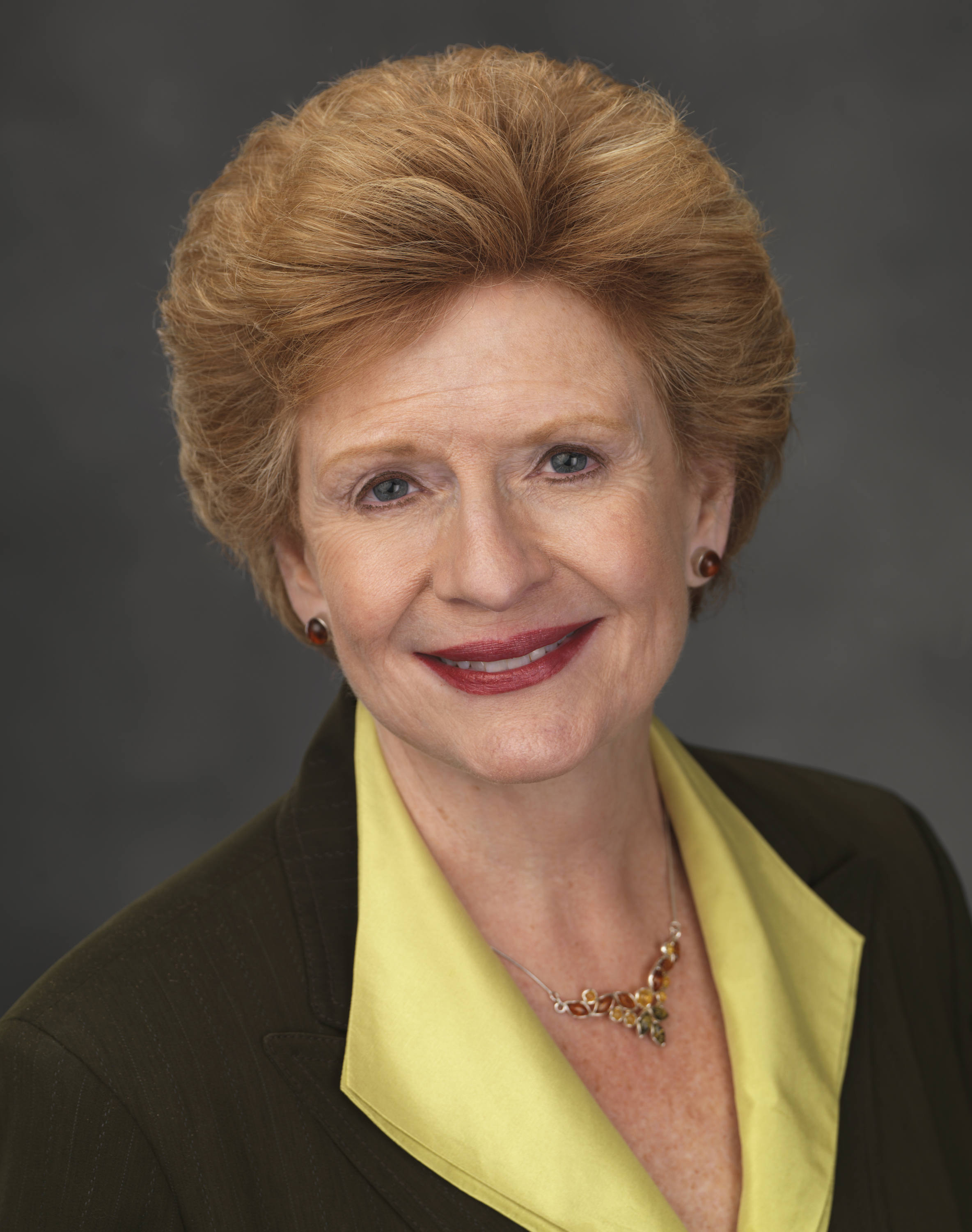
Debbie Stabenow

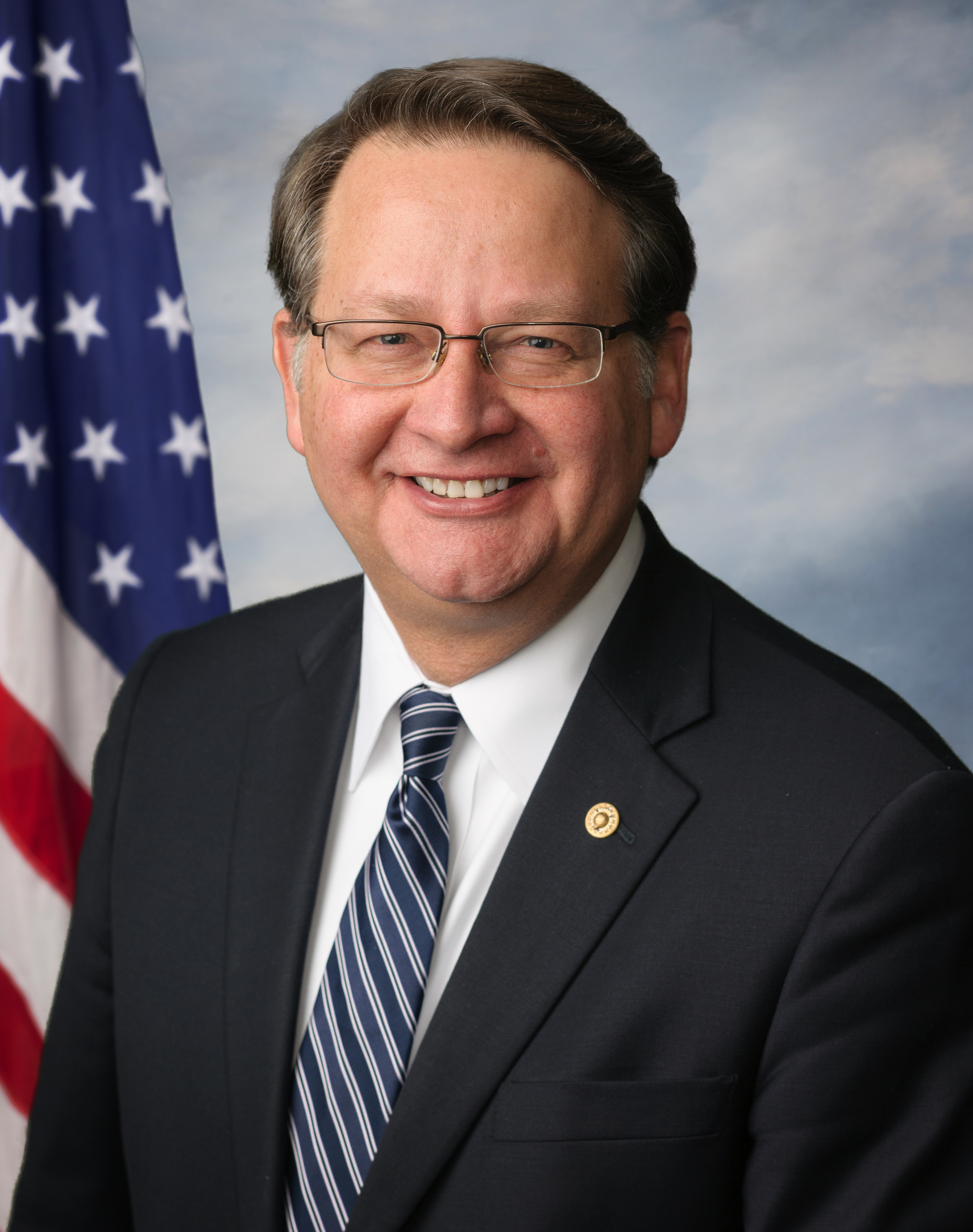
Gary Peters

- U.S. Senator from Michigan: Debbie Stabenow (Democrat)
- U.S. Senator from Michigan: Gary Peters (Democrat)
- House District 1: Jack Bergman (Republican)
- House District 2: John Moolenaar (Republican)
- House District 3: Hillary Scholten (Democrat)
- House District 4: Bill Huizenga (Republican)
- House District 5: Tim Walberg (Republican)
- House District 6: Debbie Dingell (Democrat)
- House District 7: Tom Barrett (Republican)
- House District 8: Dan Kildee (Democrat)
- House District 9: Lisa McClain (Republican)
- House District 10: John James (Republican)
- House District 11: Haley Stevens (Democrat)
- House District 12: Rashida Tlaib (Democrat)
- House District 13: Shri Thanedar (Democrat)

== Sports ==
=== Baseball ===
- 2023 Detroit Tigers season - Led by manager A. J. Hinch, the Tigers compiled a 78–84 (.481) and finished in second place in the AL Central. The team's statistical leaders included first baseman Spencer Torkelson (31 home runs, 94 RBIs), center fielder Riley Greene (.288 batting average), and Eduardo Rodriguez (13 wins).
- 2023 Michigan State Spartans baseball team - In their 14th season under head coach Jake Boss, the Spartans compiled a 33–22 record.
- 2023 Michigan Wolverines baseball team - In their first season under head coach Tracy Smith, the Wolverines compiled a 28–28 record.
- 2023 Michigan Wolverines softball team - In their first season under head coach Bonnie Tholl, the Wolverines compiled a 26–25 record.

=== American football ===
- 2023 Detroit Lions season - Led by head coach Dan Campbell, the Lions compiled a 12–5 and won the NFC North championship.
- 2023 Michigan Wolverines football team - In their ninth and final season under head coach Jim Harbaugh, the Wolverines compiled a 15–0 record and won the national championship. Michigan's statistical leaders included quarterback J. J. McCarthy with 2,991 passing yards and running back Blake Corum with 1,245 rushing yards and 27 rushing touchdowns.
- 2023 Michigan State Spartans football team - In their final season under head coach Mel Tucker, the Spartans compiled an 0–8 record, as the Spartans' four wins were later vacated by the NCAA.
- 2023 Michigan Panthers season - The Panthers compiled a 4–6 record.

=== Basketball ===
- 2022–23 Detroit Pistons season
- 2022–23 Michigan Wolverines men's basketball team
- 2022–23 Michigan State Spartans men's basketball team

=== Hockey ===
- 2022–23 Detroit Red Wings season
- 2022–23 Michigan Wolverines men's ice hockey season
- 2022–23 Michigan State Spartans men's ice hockey season
- 2022–23 Western Michigan Broncos men's ice hockey season

=== Auto racing ===
- 2023 Chevrolet Detroit Grand Prix
- 2023 Dutch Boy 150
- 2023 FireKeepers Casino 400
- 2023 Henry Ford Health 200
- 2023 Herr's Snacks 200

=== Other ===
- 2023 Cranbrook Tennis Classic
- 2023 Detroit City FC season
- 2023 Dow Tennis Classic

== Chronology ==
=== January ===
- January 5 - Debbie Stabenow, first elected to the U.S. Senate in 2000, announced that she would not run for a fifth term in 2024.
- January 6 - On the second anniversary of the January 6 United States Capitol attack, President Biden bestowed the Presidential Citizens Medal, the second-highest civilian award in the United States, on Michigan Secretary of State Jocelyn Benson for her work in protecting election integrity following the 2000 presidential election.
- January 20 - General Motors announced plans to invest $918 million in four US plants, including two in Michigan.
- January 20 - Michigan co-offensive coordinator Matt Weiss was fired following an investigation of computer access crimes by university police. Weiss was later indicted on federal charges of unauthorized access to computers and identity theft. Weiss allegedly obtained unauthorized access to the student-athlete databases of over 100 schools as well as the social media, email, and/or cloud storage accounts of more than 2,000 individual student athletes.
- January 25 - Gov. Gretchen Whitmer delivered her State of the State speech, calling for free preschool for all four-year-olds, gun safety laws, tax cuts for seniors and low-income workers, and legal protection for LGBTQ residents.
- January 31 - General Motors announced that its 42,300 hourly workers would receive profit-sharing checks of up to $12,750. The amount was a record for profit-sharing payouts in the automobile industry.

=== February ===
- February 12 - In the 2023 Lake Huron high-altitude object, the US military shot down an unidentified object over Lake Huron after it had been tracked flying at 20,000 feet across Michigan's Upper Peninsula.
- February 13 - Ford announced a deal with the state to build a $3.5 billion battery plant, known as the BlueOval Battery Park, in Marshall.
- February 13 - As part of a plea deal, former Michigan State basketball star Keith Appling pleaded guilty to second-degree murder in connection with the 2021 shooting of Clyde Edmonds in exchange for a sentence of 18 to 40 years in prison.
- February 13 – 2023 Michigan State University shooting: A 43-year-old man, Anthony Dwayne McRae, armed with two 9 mm handguns, went on a shooting rampage just after 8 p.m. at a classroom in Berkey Hall and at the MSU Union on the Michigan State campus. He killed three students, ages 19 and 20, and injured five others before taking his own life when he was stopped by police four miles from campus. Notes found on the assailant included a list of other places he wanted to visit, including a Meijer warehouse in Delta Township where he had worked and businesses that he had previously been asked to leave.
- February 22 - Stellantis announced profit-sharing payments of $14,760 for its union workers, the largest payouts in the industry.
- February 27 - Elissa Slotkin announced her candidacy for U.S. Senate.

=== March ===
- March 7 - Gov. Gretchen Whitmer signed a bill reversing changes in tax law adopted in 2011 during the administration of Gov. Rick Snyder.
- March 9 - Randall Robert Berka II, a 30-year-old Sebewaing resident with a history of mental health problems, was arrested after making threats to kill FBI agents, members of the LGBTQ community, President Biden, and Governor Whitmer. His mother had purchased three long guns and a pistol for him during the prior year. He pleaded guilty in February 2024 to possession of a firearm by a prohibited person and was setneced to 32 months in prison, three years of supervised release, and a $250,000 fine. His mother was sentenced to two years of probation for knowingly making false statements to the gun sellers.
- March 16 - Gov. Gretchen Whitmer signed a bill into law prohibiting discrimination based on sexual orientation, gender identity and gender expression.
- March 23 - The Michigan Court of Appeals rejected an appeal by James and Jennifer Crumbley. A three-judge panel concluded that their son's actions in the Oxford High School shooting were "foreseeable" and there was sufficient evidence to send the matter to a jury.
- March 25 - Gov. Gretchen Whitmer signed a bill into law repealing Michigan's right-to-work law. The bill also reinstated a law requiring contractors to pay union-level wages and benefits on state-funded construction projects.
- March 25 - Shawn Fain was declared the winner over incumbent Ray Curry in the election for presidency of the United Auto Workers (UAW).

=== April ===
- April - An outbreak of blastomycosis fungal infection at the Billerud paper mill in Delta County in the Upper Peninsula affected 104 workers, contractors and visitors, 13 requiring hospitalization and one dead. It was the largest known blastomycosis outbreak in US history. The mill returned to full operation on May 9.
- April 2 - Former Macomb County Public Works Commissioner Anthony Marrocco was sentenced to 450 days of home detention after pleading guilty to one count of extortion.
- April 5 - Gov. Gretchen Whitmer signed a bill repealing Michigan's 1931 law banning abortions in the state.
- April 6 - Rick Johnson, former Michigan House Speaker and chairman of the state's medical marijuana licensing board, was charged in federal court with accepting bribes from individuals seeking licenses to operate medical marijuana businesses.
- April 9 - Dwane Casey stepped down as coach of the Detroit Pistons following the conclusion of the season with a 17–65 record.
- April 9 - A report from S&P Analytics showed that Ford led the auto industry with (i) eighty percent of vehicles sold in the US were assembled in the US, (ii) 57,000 hourly autoworkers in the US, and (iii) 260,000 US assembled vehicles exported to other countries.
- April 12 - Nandi Comer was named Michigan's poet laureate.
- April 13 - Gov Whitmer signed bills expanding background checks on gun purchases and establishing penalties for those who fail to keep firearms out of the hands of children.
- April 21 - The Michigan Court of Appeals ruled that Warren Mayor James R. Fouts was ineligible under Michigan's term limits law to run for a fifth term. The Michigan Supreme Court on May 17 declined to review the decision. Fouts later filed a federal suit challenging his ballot disqualification; that suit was dismissed on September 5.
- April 24 - The federal government filed suit against Detroit media mogul Kevin Adell for $17.8 million in unpaid estate and gift taxes.
- April 25 - Ford Motor reopened the Albert Kahn-designed Detroit Public Schools Book Depository after a four-year redevelopment project. The building became the Detroit headquarters of NewLab and part of Ford's Central Mobiity Innovation District.

=== May ===
- May 3 - The Spinners, formed in Ferndale in the 1950s, were announced as part of the 2023 class for induction into the Rock & Roll Hall of Fame. They were the 21st Detroit artist selected for induction into the Hall of Fame.
- May 27 - Pontiac-based United Wholesale Mortgage surpassed Detroit-based Rocket Mortgage as the country's top mortgage company, based on origination volume.

=== June ===
- June and July - The 2023 Canadian wildfires spread smoke across southeastern Michigan.
- June 1 - The Detroit Pistons hired Monty Williams as the team's new head coach with a six-year contract guaranteeing $78.5 million.
- June 3–5 - The Detroit Grand Prix returned from Belle Isle to downtown Detroit for the first time in 32 years.
- June 5 - General Motors announced a $1 billion investment in Flint Assembly and Flint Metal Center to build the company's next generation of gasoline-burning heavy-duty pickup trucks.
- June 23 - Statue of Martin Luther King Jr. unveiled at Hart Plaza in Detroit.
- June 25 - The USS Carl M. Levin, a guided-missile destroyer, was commissioned. The ship was named for longtime U.S. Senator Carl Levin.
- June 29 - Kimberly Andrews Espy was appointed president of Wayne State University, the first woman to hold the position.

=== July ===
- July 8 - Three Detroit Tigers pitchers (Matt Manning, Jason Foley, and Alex Lange) combined for a no-hitter against the Toronto Blue Jays.
- July 18 – Michigan prosecution of fake electors: Michigan Attorney General Dana Nessel announced felony charges against 16 Republicans who sought to award Michigan's Electoral College votes to Donald Trump in the 2020 United States presidential election in Michigan despite Trump's losing the state by 154,188 votes. The defendants, including former Michigan Republican Party co-chair Meshawn Maddock, signed a certificate stating that they were the duly elected and qualified electors from Michigan. The charges were dismissed in September 2025 for lack of evidence of fraudulent intent. In November 2025, President Trump preemptively pardoned the defendants.
- July 26 - Gov. Whitmer signed legislation bans licensed mental health professionals in Michigan from practicing conversion therapy on LGBTQ+ minors.
- July 27 – USA Gymnastics sex abuse scandal: A lawsuit is filed against Michigan State University accusing the school of "illegal secret votes" to prevent the release of 6,000 documents in the case of an investigation involving Larry Nassar, who was sentenced to 40 to 175 years in prison in 2018.
- July 30 – Five people between 16 and 26 years old were wounded, two of them critically, in a Sunday-morning shooting at the Logan Square shopping center plaza in Lansing.

=== August ===
- August 1 – Former Republican candidate for attorney general Matt DePerno and former Republican state representative Daire Rendon were indicted by a grand jury and charged with illegally accessing voting machines in an attempt to prove false claims of voter fraud in the 2020 presidential election.
- August 6 - Smokey Robinson returned to Detroit for a concert at the Fox Theatre.
- August 13 - A Russian fighter jet crashed during the Yankee Air Museum "Thunder over Michigan" air show at the Willow Run Airport as thousand of spectators warched. The pilot and copilot successfully ejected before the crash.
- August 21 - The University of Michigan suspended head football coach Jim Harbaugh for the first three games of the season amid an NCAA investigation of possible recruiting violations and misleading NCAA investigators.
- August 25 - Tornadoes across southern Michigan from Kent County to Monroe County leave five dead and hundreds of thousands without power. An EF-1 struck near Belleville, and an EF-0 near Canton. Gov. Whitmer declared a state of emergency in Wayne and Monroe Counties.

=== September ===
- September 10 - Michigan State football head coach Mel Tucker was suspended after public revelation of sexual harassment allegations. Brenda Tracy, a rape survivor and advocate against sexual violence, alleged that she was repeatedly harassed by Tucker after being invited to speak to the football team in 2022. The alleged harassment included masturbating during a phone call with Tracy. Tucker was fired by the university on September 27. Tucker later filed a wrongful termination and defamation lawsuit against the university in 2024.
- September 15 - The 2023 United Auto Workers strike began at selected plants operated by the Big Three in Michigan, Ohio and Missouri. It was the first time the UAW had struck all three Detroit automakers at the same time. At the opening of the strike, hundreds of UAW members and supporters also marched through downtown Detroit ending at General Motors' headquarters at the Renaissance Center. The strike continued for over a month.
- September 22 - The UAW expanded its strike with walk-outs at 38 General Motors and Stellantis facilities in Michigan, Ohio, Colorado, Wisconsin, Illinois, Nevada, California, Texas, West Virginia, Mississippi, North Carolina, Tennessee, Pennsylvania, Georgia, Florida, Massachusetts, and New York.
- September 26 – President Joe Biden walked the picket line with UAW workers at General Motors' Willow Run Redistribution Center in Van Buren Township. He was the first sitting American president to join a union picket line.
- September 27 - Census data was released showing that Michigan's Middle Eastern or North African (MENA) population had surpassed 300,000, making it the state with the second largest MENA population after California. The data also showed that a majority (54.5%) of the 109,975 residents of Dearborn were of MENA ancestry. The MENA category was added for the 2020 census and included Arabic-speaking countries, and Iranian, Israeli, Chaldean, Assyrian, and Kurdish people.
- September 29 - The UAW epanded its strike to Ford's Chicago Assembly plant and General Motors' Delta Township Assembly plant.
- September 30 - The Detroit Tigers held a Miggy Day to honor Miguel Cabrera's last day in Major League Baseball. He spent 16 seasons in Detroit.

=== October ===
- October 4 - General Motors estimated that the UAW strike cost the company $200 million during the third quarter.
- October 16 - Bill Ford held a press conference warning that the UAW strike was huring the American automakers in their battle with non-union foreign auto companies, including Toyota, Honda, Tesla, and Chinese makers. He described himself as the most pro-union leader in the industry and urged the union to end the strike.
- October 17 - The 2023 Detroit casino strike began with 3,700 workers striking against three Detroit casinos (MGM Grand, MotorCity and Hollywood Casino at Greektown) after they failed to reach a new labor agreement by a noon deadline. It was the first strike against the Detroit casinos since they opened in the late 1990s and 2000. The strike ended at the MotorCity and Hollywood casinos on November 19 when workers there approved a new contract. MGM reached agreement with the unions two weeks later, with workers ratifying the contract on December 2.
- October 19 - Unions representing auto workers, casino workers, insurance workers, and nursing home workers, all on strike, held a unity march in downtown Detroit. Workers then gathered at Hart Plaza, chanting, "strike city" and "no contract, no peace."
- October 20 - The rock band Kiss gave its final concert in Michigan, performing at Little Caesars Arena. The band's 1976 hit "Detroit Rock City" created a 47-year bond between the city and the band.
- October 21 - Killing of Samantha Woll - The body of 40-year-old Samantha Woll, a prominent Jewish leader and president of Detroit's Isaac Agree Downtown Synagogue, was discovered with multiple stab wounds outside her home in Detroit's Lafayette Park neighborhood. She had been stabbed eight times in the face and neck. Amid speculation, police stated they had no evidence that the killing was a hate crime targeting a Jewish leader. Two days after the killing, Detroit Police Chief James White said he was confident the killing was "not motivated by antisemitism." After the prior arrest and release of another suspect in November, police in December arrested and charged Michael Jackson-Bolanos, a 28-year-old with a history of property crimes, including felony murder during a home invasion. After a trial in 2024, the jury deadlocked on charges of felony murder and home invasion and found him guilty only of lying to police about his role in the death.
- October 23/24 - The UAW expanded its strike to the 6,500 workers at Stellantis' Sterling Heights Assembly plant and to General Motors' Arlington Assembly plant.
- October 25 - UAW president Shawn Fain announced that the union had reached an agreement with Ford. Deals with Stellantis and General Motors followed on October 28 and October 30, respectively.

=== November ===
- November 3 - Connor Stalions was fired amid investigations into the University of Michigan football sign-stealing scandal. One week later, on November 10, head coach Jim Harbaugh was suspended for three games by the Big Ten in connection with the scandal.
- November 7 - Under threat of censure over her use of the phrase "From the river to the sea," U.S. Rep. Rashida Tlaib of Detroit defended her criticism of Israel and demand for a cease-fire in Gaza.
- November 16 - UAW member at General Motors ratified the union's new contract with the company.
- November 18 - The Michigan football team won the program's 1,000th game, the first program to reach the threshold.
- November 20 - Gov. Gretchen Whitmer signed legislation banning those with domestic violence conviction from possessing and purchasing firearms and ammunition.
- November 20 - The UAW confirmed that new labor contracts with Detroit's Big Three automakers had been ratified.
- November 25 - Michigan defeated Ohio State to finish the regular season undefeated.
- November 28 - Michigan State hired Jonathan Smith as its new head football coach.
- November 28 - A federal court found the former owner of the Edenville Dam liable to the Michigan Departments of Natural Resources and Environment, Great Lakes, and Energy for $120 million in damages to fisheries and mussel populations as a result of the 6,600-foot earthen dam's failure on May 19, 2020.

=== December ===
- December 8 - Oxford school shooter Ethan Crumbley was sentenced to life in prison without the possibility of parole.
- December 22 - Michigan Attorney General Dana Nessel announced that two associates of former Michigan House Speaker Lee Chatfield had been indicted on 12 felony counts of misappropriating funds. The defendants were Anne Minard, a consultant to Chatfield, and Rob Minard, who served as Chatfield's chief of staff.
- December 24 - The Detroit Lions clinched the NFC North championship with a come-from-behind 30–24 victory over the Minnesota Vikings.
- December 27 - Presidential eligibility of Donald Trump#Michigan: The Michigan Supreme Court declined to overturn a lower court decision that rejected an attempt to exclude Donald Trump from the Michigan Republican primary ballot. The underlying suit had contended that Trump was disqualified under the 14th Amendment for having "engaged in insurrection or rebellion" against the U.S.
- December 30 – Four family members (Hope and Don Bragg and their two adult children) visiting from Arkansas were killed and two others injured in a house explosion in Northfield Township.

== Deaths ==
- January 16 - Johnny Powers, early Detroit rock and rockabilly pioneer, at age 84
- January 17 - Chris Ford, Detroit Pistons shooting guard (1972–82), at age 74
- January 28 - Barrett Strong, singer-songwriter (his "Money (That's What I Want)" was the first hit single for Motown), at age 81
- March 3 - Barbara Everitt Bryant, first woman to lead Census Bureau, in Ann Arbor
- March 3 - Tom Sizemore, actor and Detroit native, at age 61 in California
- March 23 - Jerry Green, Detroit sports writer (1956–2004), Pro Football Hall of Fame, at age 94
- March 31 - Gene Derricotte, UM halfback (1944–48), at age 96
- April 2 - Toni Elling, aka "Satin Doll", burlesque dancer, at age 94
- May 1 - Gordon Lightfoot, Canadian singer-songwriter who wrote and performed "The Wreck of the Edmund Fitzgerald". The bells at Mariners' Church in Detroit chimed 30 times to honor the dead sailors and the artist who famously memorialized them.
- May 4 - Petr Klima, Red Wings (1985–90), at age 58
- May 7 - Bobby Wilson, defensive tackle for Michigan State and Washington Redskins
- May 10 - Ed Flanagan, Detroit Lions center (1965–74) and member of Lions' all-time team, at age 79
- May 25 - Denny Stolz, Michigan State football HC (1971–75), at age 89
- June 4 - Roger Craig, Detroit Tigers pitching coach (1980–84), at age 93
- June 10 - Ted Kaczynski, Unabomber and former University of Michigan student
- June 16 - Daniel Ellsberg, Pentagon Papers leaker grew up in Detroit and attended Cranbrook School, at age 92
- June 19 - Gerald C. Meyers, chairman and CEO of American Motors Corporation (1977–1982), at age 94
- June 27 - Ryan Mallett, UM quarterback 2007, at age 35
- July 9 - Mel Wakabayashi, UM hockey center, WCHA POY 1966
- July 10 - JoAnn Watson, Detroit city council (2003–13), at age 72
- August 2 - Wayne Comer, Detroit Tigers outfielder (1967–680, 1972), at age 79
- August 7 - Jim Price, Detroit Tigers catcher (1967–71), radio analyst/color commentator (1993–2023), at age 81
- August 8 - Sixto Rodriguez, singer from Detroit, gained fame in South Africa, at age 81
- c. August 25 - Mildred Madison, voting rights advocate, at age 97
- August 30 - Tom Cecchini, linebacker for Michigan (1963–65), at age 78
- September 7 - Geechy Guy, comedian, at age 59
- September 19 - Phil Sellers, Detroit Pistons (1976–77), at age 69
- September 24 - James Skala, UM basketball leading scorer and MVP 1951–52, at age 93
- October 9 - Terry Dischinger, Detroit Pistons (1964–72), at age 82
- c. October 13 - Florine Mark, former president and CEO of Weight Watchers Group, at age 90
- October 14 - Piper Laurie, 3-time Oscar-nominated actress born and raised in Detroit, at age 91
- October 21 - Natalie Zemon Davis, historian, at age 94
- October 30 - Frank Howard, Detroit Tigers (1972–73), at age 87
- November 20 - Willie Hernández, Detroit Tigers relief pitcher (1984–89), at age 69
- November 29 - Charles Gilchrist Adams, pastor and professor of ethics, at age 86
- December 18 - Amp Fiddler, singer, songwriter, producer, at age 65
- December 19 - Ed Budde, football guard, All-American at Michigan State, at age 83

== See also ==
- 2023 in the United States
