= 2021 in Michigan =

- Decades: 2000s; 2010s; 2020s
- See also: History of Michigan; Historical outline of Michigan; List of years in Michigan; 2021 in the United States

Events from the year 2021 in Michigan.

Major events in Michigan in 2021 included the COVID-19 pandemic in Michigan, the Oxford High School shooting, disruptions in the supply chain slowing the automobile industry, the 2021 Kellogg's strike, and legal proceedings relating to the Gretchen Whitmer kidnapping plot.

Major sports stories in 2021 included the 2021 Michigan Wolverines football team defeating Ohio State, winning the Big Ten Conference championship, and advancing to the College Football Playoffs for the first time in school history. Other notable sports stories included (i) the Detroit Lions trading quarterback Matthew Stafford to the Los Angeles Rams, (ii) the 2020–21 Michigan Wolverines men's basketball team finishing the season ranked No. 4 and advancing to the Elite Eight, (iii) the 2021 Michigan State Spartans football team finishing the season ranked No. 8 in the Coaches Poll, (iv) the induction of Calvin Johnson and Charles Woodson into the Pro Football Hall of Fame, and (v) the undefeated 2021 Ferris State Bulldogs football team winning the NCAA Division II national championship. The Detroit Tigers, Detroit Lions, Detroit Red Wings, and Detroit Pistons all compiled losing records

== Office holders ==
=== State office holders ===
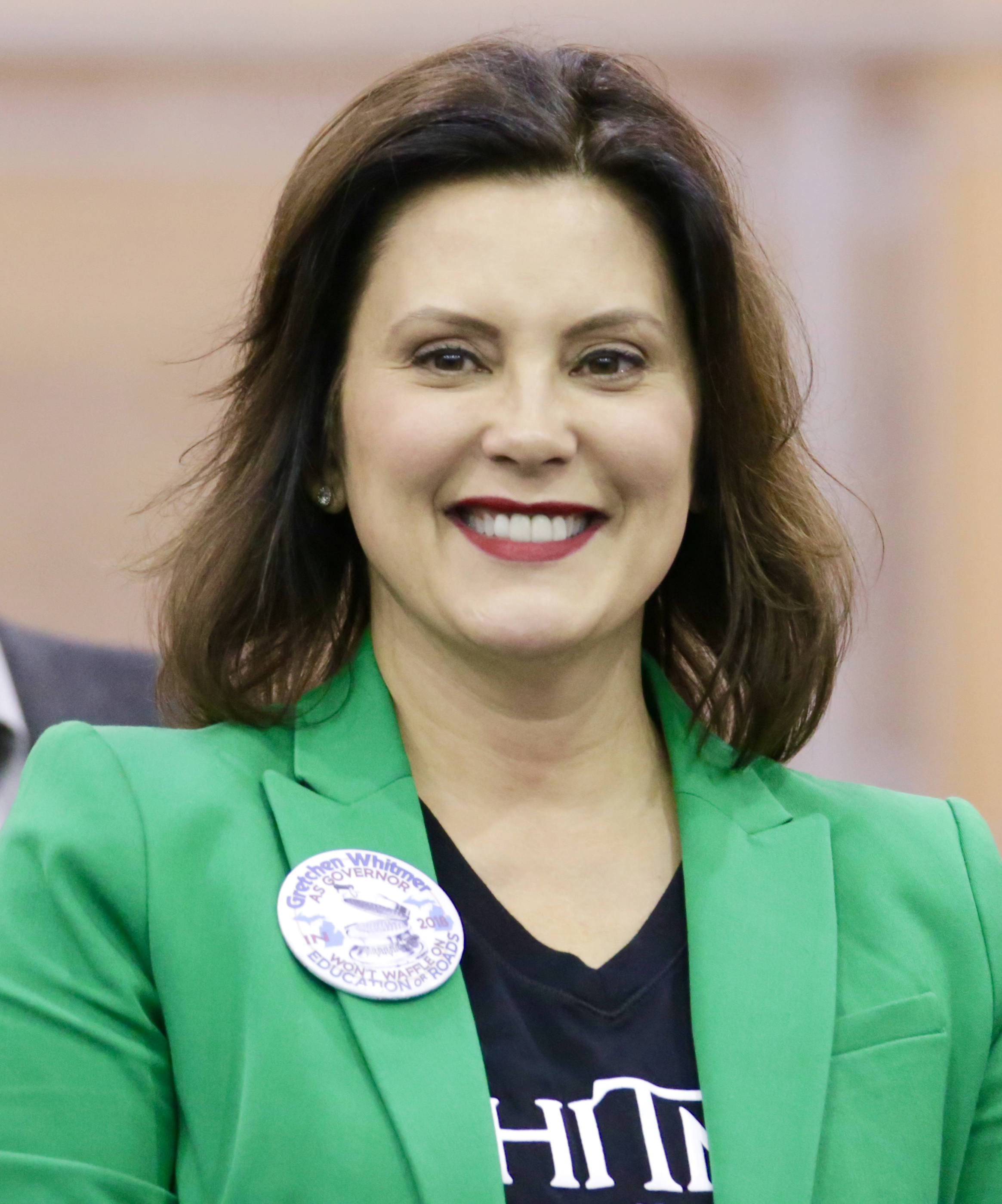
Gretchen Whitmer

- Governor of Michigan: Gretchen Whitmer (Democratic)
- Lieutenant Governor of Michigan: Garlin Gilchrist (Democratic)
- Michigan Attorney General: Dana Nessel (Democratic)
- Michigan Secretary of State: Jocelyn Benson (Democratic)
- Speaker of the Michigan House of Representatives: Jason Wentworth (Republican)
- Majority Leader of the Michigan Senate: Mike Shirkey (Republican)
- Chief Justice, Michigan Supreme Court: Bridget Mary McCormack

=== Mayors of major cities ===
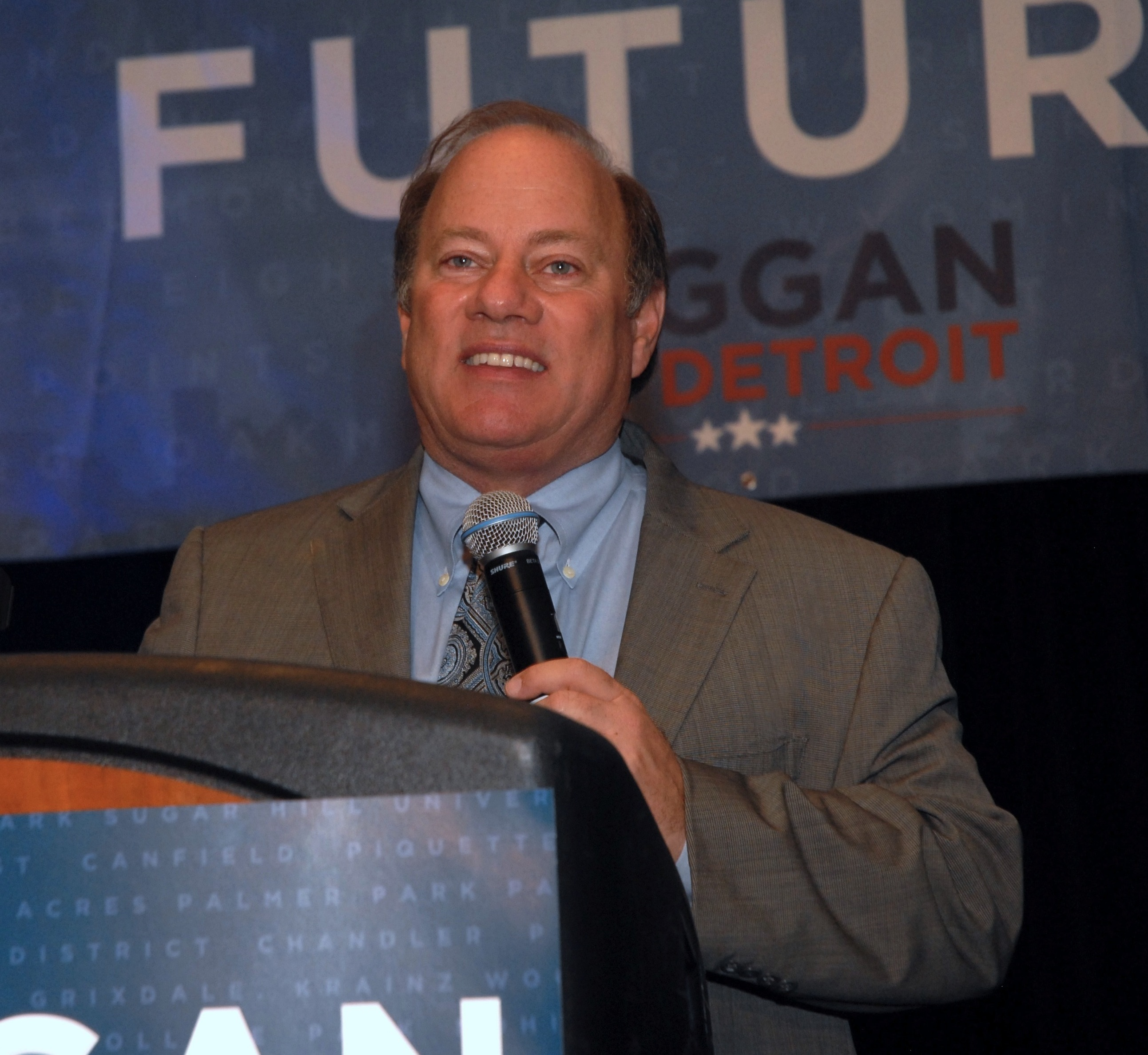
Mike Duggan

- Mayor of Detroit: Mike Duggan (Democrat)
- Mayor of Warren, Michigan: James R. Fouts
- Mayor of Grand Rapids: Rosalynn Bliss
- Mayor of Sterling Heights, Michigan: Michael C. Taylor
- Mayor of Ann Arbor: Christopher Taylor (Democrat)
- Mayor of Dearborn: John B. O'Reilly Jr.
- Mayor of Lansing: Andy Schor (Democrat)
- Mayor of Flint: Sheldon Neeley
- Mayor of Saginaw: Brenda Moore

=== Federal office holders ===
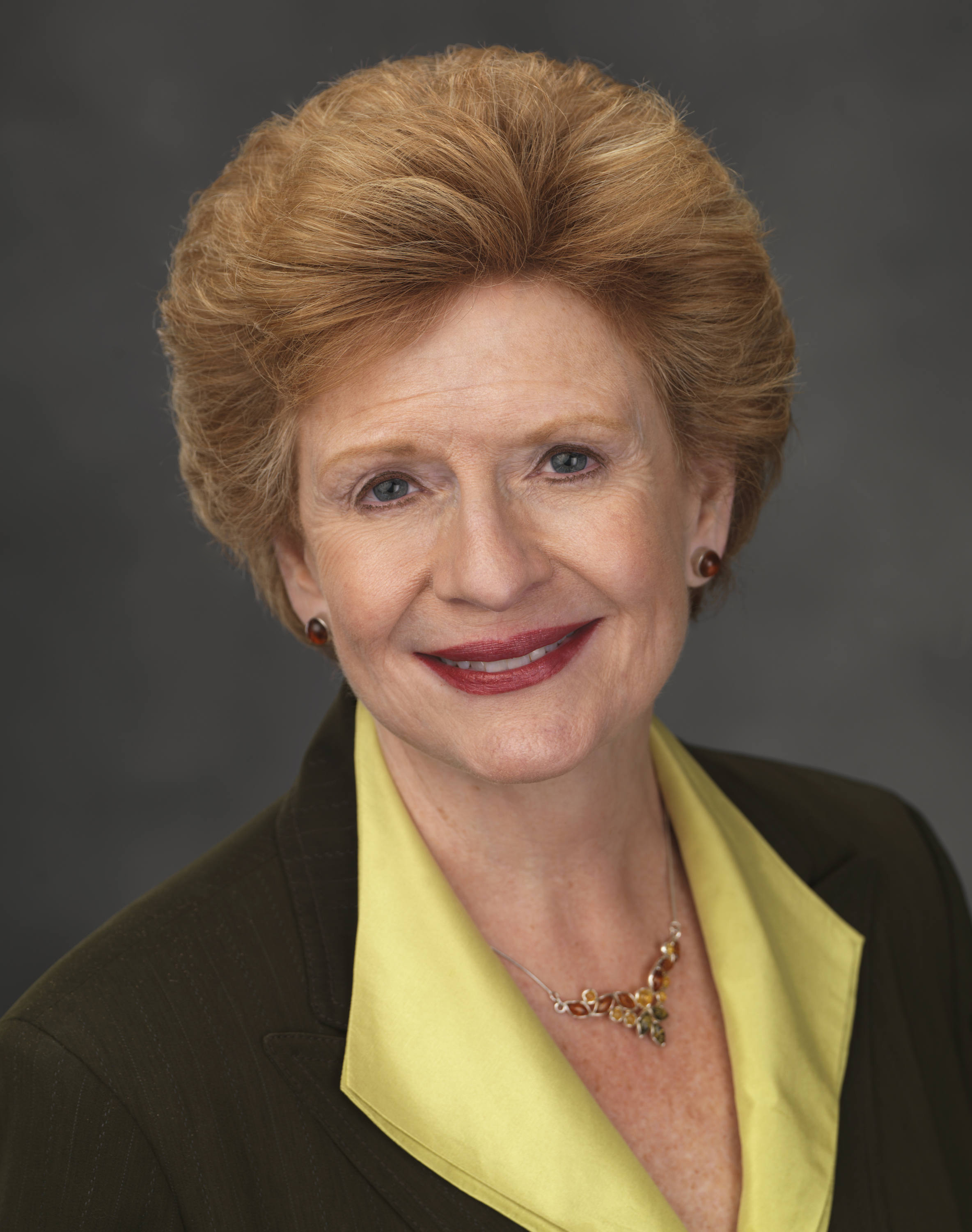
Debbie Stabenow

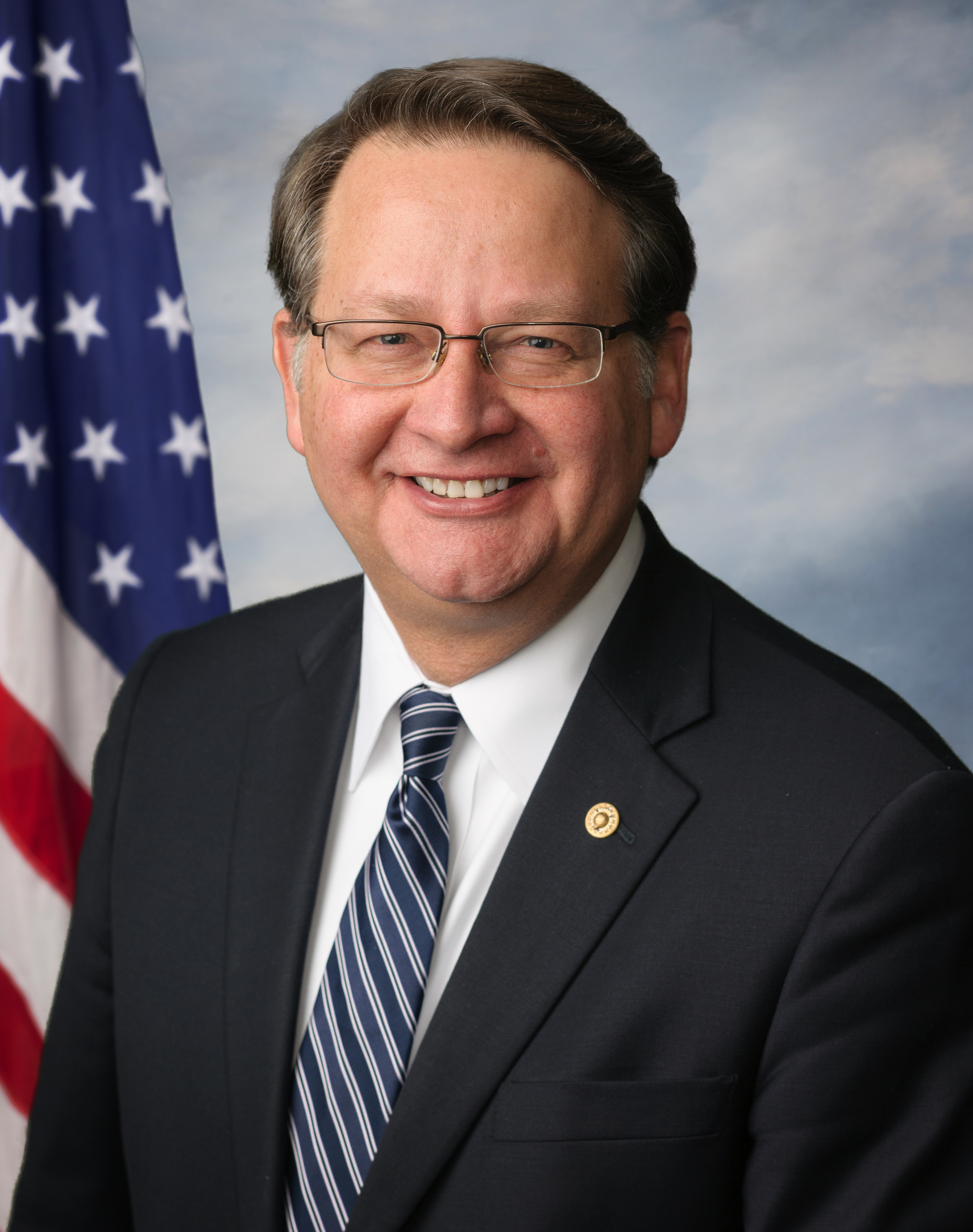
Gary Peters

- U.S. Senator from Michigan: Debbie Stabenow (Democrat)
- U.S. Senator from Michigan: Gary Peters (Democrat)
- House District 1: Jack Bergman (Republican)
- House District 2: Bill Huizenga (Republican)
- House District 3: Peter Meijer (Republican)
- House District 4: John Moolenaar (Republican)
- House District 5: Dan Kildee (Democrat)
- House District 6: Fred Upton (Republican)
- House District 7: Tim Walberg (Republican)
- House District 8: Elissa Slotkin (Democrat)
- House District 9: Andy Levin (Democrat)
- House District 10: Lisa McClain (Republican)
- House District 11: Haley Stevens (Democrat)
- House District 12: Debbie Dingell (Democrat)
- House District 13: Rashida Tlaib (Democrat)
- House District 14: Brenda Lawrence (Democrat)

== Population of largest cities ==
The state's 15 largest cities, based on U.S. Census estimates for 2021, were as follows:

2021 rank	City	County	2000 pop.	2010 pop.	2020 pop.	2021 pop. (est)	Change 2000-21
1	Detroit	Wayne	951,270	713,777	639,111	632,464	−33.5% ▼
2	Grand Rapids	Kent	197,800	188,036	198,917	198,173	0.2% ▲
3	Sterling Heights	Macomb	124,471	129,699	134,346	133,269	7.1% ▲
4	Warren	Macomb	138,247	134,056	139,387	138,130	0.1% ▼
5	Ann Arbor	Washtenaw	114,024	113,934	123,851	121,536	6.6% ▲
6	Lansing	Ingham	119,128	114,297	112,644	112,684	5.4% ▼
7	Dearborn	Wayne	97,775	98,153	109,976	108,420	8.9% ▲
8	Livonia	Wayne	100,545	96,942	95,534	94,422	6.1% ▼
9	Troy	Oakland	80,959	80,980	87,294	86,836	7.3% ▲
10	Westland	Wayne	86,602	84,094	85,420	84,515	
11	Farmington Hills	Oakland	82,111	79,740	83,986	83,292	
12	Flint	Genesee	124,943	102,434	81,252	80,628	35.5% ▼
13	Wyoming	Kent	69,368	72,125	76,501	76,749	
14	Southfield	Oakland	78,322	71,758	76,618	75,898	
15	Kalamazoo	Kalamazoo	76,145	74,262	73,598	73,257	

== Sports ==
=== Baseball ===
- 2021 Detroit Tigers season – In their first year under manager A. J. Hinch, the Tigers began the season 9–24, but played over .500 the rest of the year and compiled a 77–85 record. The team's statistical leaders included Harold Castro with a .283 batting average, Robbie Grossman with 23 home runs, Jonathan Schoop with 84 RBIs, and Tarik Skubal with eight wins and 164 strikeouts.
- 2021 Michigan Wolverines baseball team - In their ninth season under head coach Erik Bakich, the team compiled a 27–19 record.
- 2021 Michigan Wolverines softball team - In their 37th season under head coach Carol Hutchins, the team compiles a 38–8 record and was the Big Ten regular season champion.
- 2021 Little League World Series - Taylor North Little League of Taylor, Michigan, defeated West Side Little League of Hamilton, Ohio, in the championship by a 5–2 score. It was the first championship for a team from Michigan since 1959.

=== American football ===
- 2021 Detroit Lions season - Led by head coach Dan Campbell, the Lions compiled a 3–13–1 record. The team's statistical leaders included Jared Goff with 3,245 passing yards, D'Andre Swift with 617 rushing yards, and Amon-Ra St. Brown with 912 receiving yards.
- 2021 Michigan Wolverines football team - Led by head coach Jim Harbaugh, the Wolverines compiled a 12–2 record, won the Big Ten championship, and played for the first time in school history in the College Football Playoff, losing to eventual national champion Georgia. The team's statistical leaders included Cade McNamara with 2,576 passing yards and Hassan Haskins with 1,327 rushing yards. Defensive end Aidan Hutchinson was a unanimous All-American and finished second in the voting for the Heisman Trophy.
- 2021 Michigan State Spartans football team - Led by head coach Mel Tucker, the Spartans compiled an 11–2 record and defeated Pitt in the Peach Bowl. The team's statistical leaders included Payton Thorne with 3,232 passing yards, Kenneth Walker III with 1,636 rushing yards, and Jayden Reed with 1,026 receiving yards. Walker won the Walter Camp and Doak Walker Awards.
- 2021 Ferris State Bulldogs football team - Led by head coach Tony Annese, the Bulldogs compiled a perfect 14–0 record and won the NCAA Division II national championship.
- 2021 Central Michigan Chippewas football team - Led by head coach Jim McElwain, the Chippewas compiled a 9–4 record and defeated Washington State in the Sun Bowl.
- 2021 Eastern Michigan Eagles football team - Led by head coach Chris Creighton, the Eagles compiled a 7–6 record and lost to Liberty in the LendingTree Bowl.
- 2021 Western Michigan Broncos football team - Led by head coach Tim Lester, the Broncos compiled an 8–5 record and defeated Nevada in the Quick Lane Bowl.
- 2021 Michigan Tech Huskies football team - Led by head coach Steve Olson, the Huskies compiled a 6–4 record.

=== Basketball ===
- 2020–21 Detroit Pistons season – Under head coach Dwane Casey, the Pistons compiled a 20–52 record. The team's statistical leaders included Jerami Grant with 1,203 points and Mason Plumlee with 519 rebounds and 202 assists.
- 2020–21 Michigan Wolverines men's basketball team – Under head coach Juwan Howard, the Wolverines compiled a 23–5 record and advanced to the Elite Eight at the NCAA tournament. The team's statistical leaders included Hunter Dickinson with 394 points scored and 206 rebounds and Mike Smith with 149 assists.
- 2020–21 Michigan State Spartans men's basketball team – Under head coach Tom Izzo, the Spartans compiled a 15–13 record. The team's statistical leaders included Aaron Henry with 430 points, 158 rebounds, and 101 assists.
- 2020–21 Michigan Wolverines women's basketball team – Under head coach Kim Barnes Arico, the Wolverines compiled a 16–6 record.
- 2020–21 Michigan State Spartans women's basketball team - Under head coach Suzy Merchant, the team compiled a 15–9 record
- 2020–21 Central Michigan Chippewas men's basketball team - 7–16
- 2020–21 Detroit Mercy Titans men's basketball team - 12–10
- 2020–21 Eastern Michigan Eagles men's basketball team - 6–12
- 2020–21 Michigan Tech Huskies men's basketball team - 15–8, Sweet Sixteen
- 2020–21 Oakland Golden Grizzlies men's basketball team - 12–18
- 2020–21 Western Michigan Broncos men's basketball team - 5–16

=== Ice hockey ===
- 2020–21 Detroit Red Wings season – Under head coach Jeff Blashill, the Wings compiled a 19–27–10 record. The team's statistical leaders were Anthony Mantha and Adam Erne with 11 goals each and Filip Hronek with 24 assists and 26 points.Dylan Larkin was the team captain.
- 2020–21 Michigan Wolverines men's ice hockey season – Under head coach Mel Pearson, the Wolverines compiled a 15–10–1 record. The team's statistical leaders included Thomas Bordeleau with 22 points and 30 points.
- 2020–21 Michigan State Spartans men's ice hockey season - Under head coach Danton Cole, the team compiled a 7–18–2 record.
- 2020–21 Lake Superior State Lakers men's ice hockey season - 19-7-3 record
- 2020–21 Michigan Tech Huskies men's ice hockey season - 17-12-1 record
- 2020–21 Western Michigan Broncos men's ice hockey season - 10-12-3 record
- 2020–21 Northern Michigan Wildcats men's ice hockey season - 11-17-1 record
- 2020–21 Ferris State Bulldogs men's ice hockey season - 1-23-1 record

=== Other ===
- 2021 Michigan Wolverines women's gymnastics team - Led by head coach Bev Plocki, the team compiled a 29–2–0 record and won the school's first NCAA national championship. Natalie Wojcik was a four-time All-American for the Wolverines.
- 2021 Michigan Wolverines women's soccer team - Led by head coach Jennifer Klein, the Wolverines compiled an 18–4–3 record won the Big Ten Tournament and advanced to the NCAA quarterfinal.
- 2020–21 Detroit City FC season
- Fall 2021 Detroit City FC season

== Chronology of events ==
=== January ===
- January to February - Chip shortages disrupt automobile manufacturing.
- January 7 - Following the January 6 insurrection, Education Secretary Betsy DeVos of Michigan resigned, blaming Trump's rhetoric for impacting the situation
- January 11 - Michigan banned the open carry of guns inside the Michigan Capitol.
- January 13 - The House of Representatives voted to impeach President Trump for inciting the January 6 insurrection. Michigan Republican Congressmen Peter Meijer and Fred Upton voted in favor of impeachment. Faced with primary challenges in 2022, Upton opted to resign, and Meijer lost in the primary.
- January 14 - Michigan Attorney General Dana Nessel announced new indictments against former Gov. Rick Snyder and others for their roles in the Flint water crisis.
- January 15 - Michigan State Capitol boarded up and National Guard activated in preparation for armed protests on January 17.
- January 18 - Republican Aaron Van Langevelde was not nominated for another term by his party. He had resisted partisan pressure not to certify Biden's victory in 2020.
- January 19 - Gov. Whitmer announced a $5 billion COVID recovery plan
- January 20 - Kwame Kilpatrick released from prison after President Trump commuted his sentence.
- January 21 - Dan Campbell hired as Detroit Lions' head coach.
- January 21 - Michael Joseph Foy of Wixom charged with hitting police with a hockey stick during the January 6 insurrection.
- January 22 - Gov Whitmer announced that indoor dining would resume on February 1.
- January - Detroit Lions trade Matthew Stafford to the Los Angeles Rams
- January 24 - Jason Wentworth named speaker of the Michigan House of Representatives.
- January 26 - Gov. Whitmer delivered her State of the State address, outlining $3.6 billion capital-spending plan.
- January 27 - Fiat Chrysler pleads guilty in federal corruption probe and agreed to pay $30 million fine.
- January 26 - Detroit native Roz Brewer became the first black woman to be CEO of a Fortune 500 company, Walgreens.

=== February ===
- February 6 - Calvin Johnson and Charles Woodson selected for Pro Football Hall of Fame.
- February 12 - Secretary of State Jocelyn Benson announced that a statewide election audit affirmed the results of the 2020 Presidential election in Michigan.
- February 15 - Blake Griffin and Detroit Pistons agree to part ways.
- February 18 - Andrea Shaw of Detroit wins Ms. Olympia title
- February 19 - President Biden visited Pfizer's plant in Portage, Michigan.
- February 25 - Former Olympics gymnastics coach John Geddert committed suicide after being charged with human trafficking, racketeering and sexual assault.
- February - Alice Cooper records new album in Royal Oak

=== March ===
- March 2 - Gov. Whitmer eased orders limiting occupancy in restaurants, shops and other businesses. Nursing homes also permitted to allow visitors.
- March 4 - Michigan beat Michigan State to win Big Ten basketball tournament.
- March 15 - Steven Yeun, who grew up in Detroit suburbs of Taylor and Troy, nominated for best actor Academy Award for his role in "Minari".

=== September ===
- September 30 - Juwan Deering released after 15 years in prison after the current prosecutor agreed that he did not receive a fair trial on charges of setting a fire that killed five children.

=== October ===
- October 30 - Michigan State upset Michigan, 37–33, in East Lansing.

=== November ===
- November 2
  - Mike Duggan reelected as mayor of Detroit, defeating Anthony Adams. Six new members elected to the Detroit City Council.
  - A special election is held in two districts of the Michigan Senate, in which two Republicans win seats.
  - Hamtramck became the first city in the US with a city council consisting of all Muslims.
- November 12 - Michigan journalist Danny Fenster sentenced to 11 years in prison with hard labor in military-ruled Myanmar. He was released three days later in a deal brokered by diplomat Bill Richardson.
- November 27 - Michigan defeated No. 2 Ohio State, 42–27, before a crowd of 111,156 at Michigan Stadium. It was Michigan's first victory over its rival since 2011.
- November 30 - A mass shooting occurred at Oxford High School in the Detroit exurb of Oxford Township, Michigan, United States. Four students were killed, and seven other people were injured, including a teacher. Authorities arrested and charged 15-year-old sophomore Ethan Crumbley as an adult for 24 crimes, including murder and terrorism.

=== December ===
- December - Omicron variant of COVID spreads in Michigan.
- December 4 - The parents of Ethan Crumbley are charged in connection with the Oxford school shooting.
- December 4 - Michigan defeated Iowa, 42–3, in the Big Ten Championship Game
- December 5 - The Detroit Lions win their first game of the season, playing for the victims of the Oxford school shooting.
- December 9 - Attorney Geoffrey Fieger announced a $100-million lawsuit against the Oxford school district for allowing a "deranged, homicidal student to return to the class with a gun in his backpack."
- December 13 - Motion to move Ethan Crumbley from adult prison to juvenile facility pending outcome of trial was denied by the court.
- December 17 - Bernie Sanders appears at rally with striking Kellogg's workers in Battle Creek, Michigan.
- December 22 - Ferris State defeated Valdosta State in the NCAA Division II national championship game.
- December 31 - Michigan lost to Georgia, 34–11, in the Orange Bowl

== Deaths ==
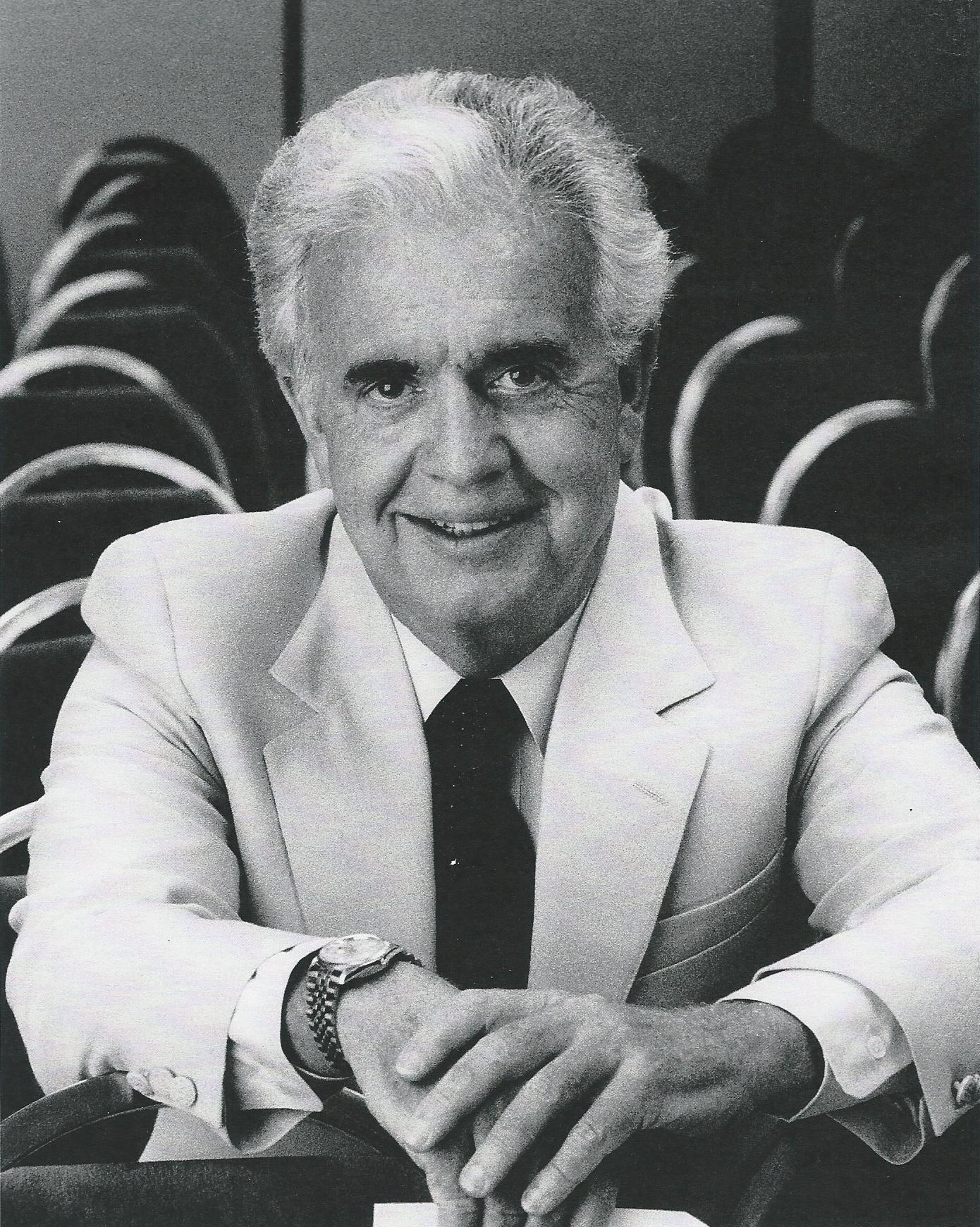
Frank J. Kelley

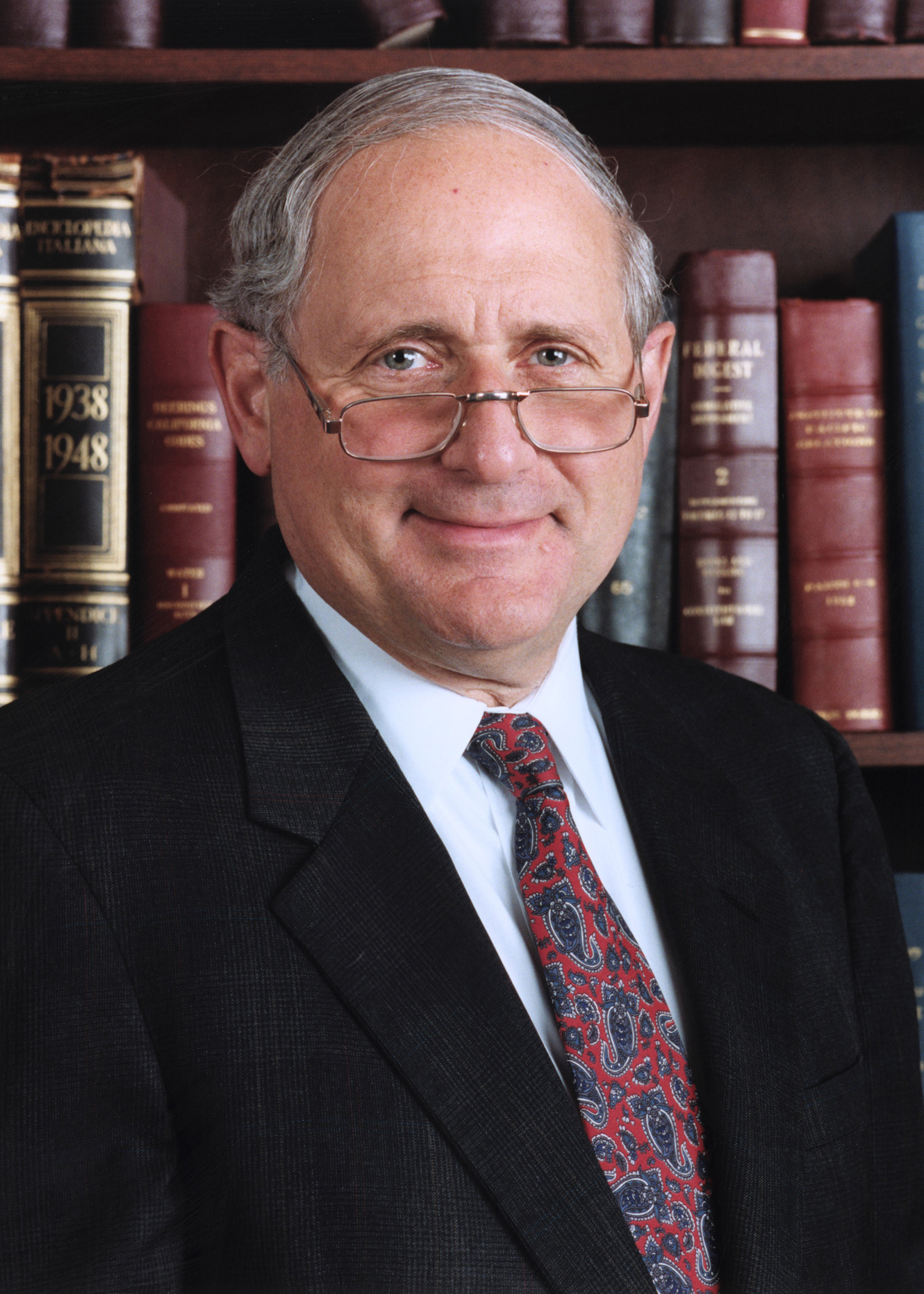
Carl Levin

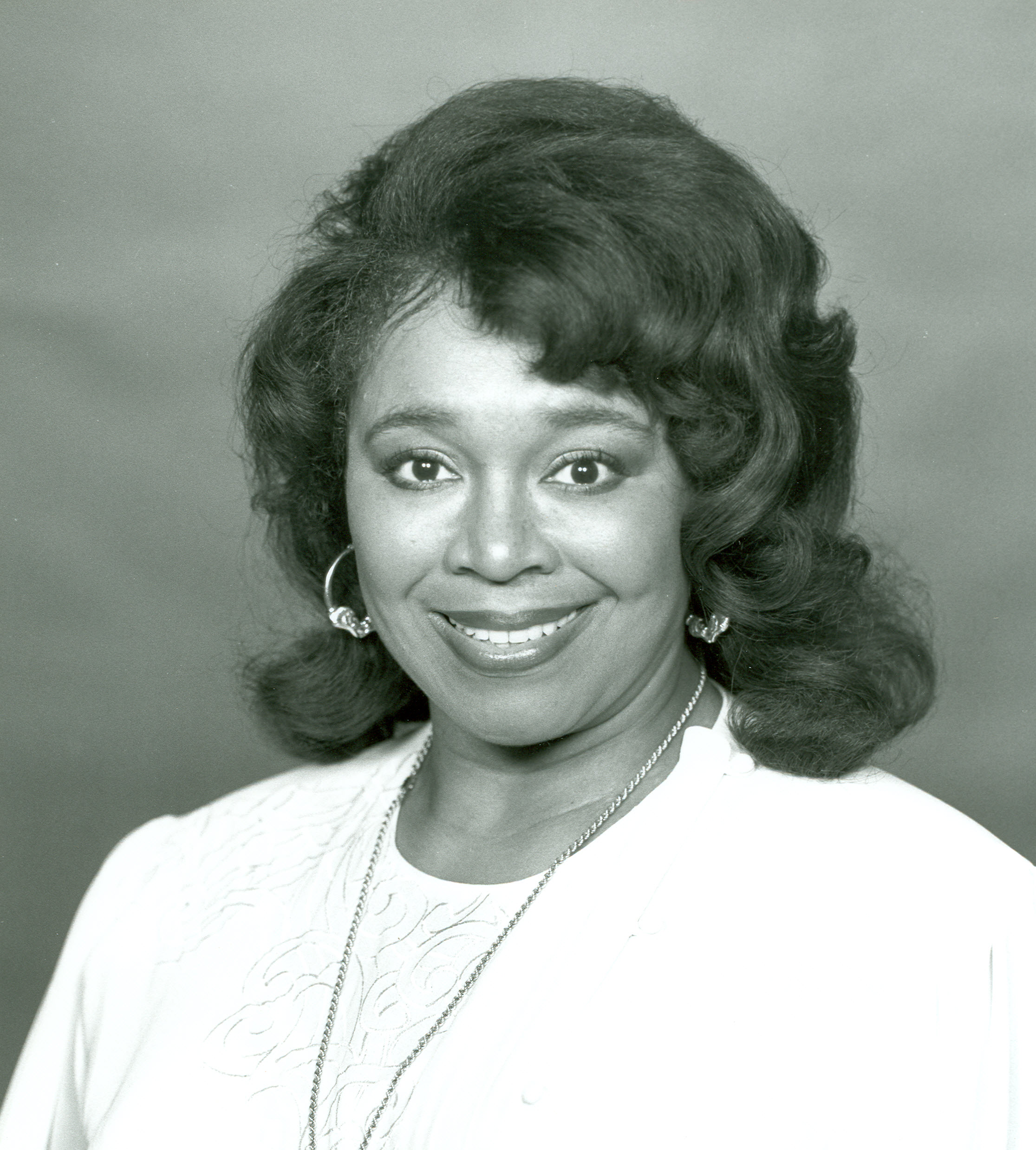
Barbara Rose Collins

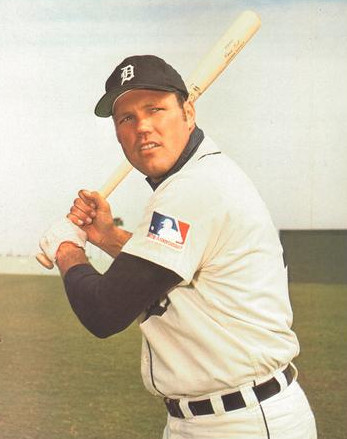
Bill Freehan

- January 14 - Shirley Johnson, member of the Michigan House of Representatives (1981–1992, 1993–1998) and Senate (1999–2004), at age 83.
- February 8 - Mary Wilson, founding member of The Supremes, at age 78 in Henderson, Nevada
- March 3 - Joe Altobelli, Detroit native and MLB manager 1977–1985, at age 88 in Rochester, New York
- March 5 - Frank J. Kelley, Attorney General of Michigan 1961–1999, at age 96 in Naples, Florida
- April 17 - Bill Mogk, Michigan first baseman and UM Athletic Hall of Fame inductee, at age 89
- April 30 - Eli Broad, billionaire and Michigan State alumnus and benefactor, at age 87 in Los Angeles
- May 1 - Joseph Z. Nederlander, theater owner and operator, at age 93 in Bloomfield Township, Oakland County, Michigan
- May 12 - Jerry Burns, Michigan football (1947-1950) and coach for Minnesota Vikings (1986-1991), at age 94 in Eden Prairie, Minnesota
- May 26 - Tom Shannon, CKLW disc jockey and morning show host on Detroit Channel
- May 31 - Mike Marshall, MLB pitcher 1967–1981, first relief pitcher to win Cy Young Award, and native of Adrian, Michigan, at age 78 in Florida
- July 26 - Mike Howe, Metal Church singer and native of Taylor, Michigan, at age 55 in Eureka, California
- July 29 - Carl Levin, US Senator from Michigan 1979–2015, at age 87 in Detroit
- August 10 - Tony Esposito, hockey goaltender for Michigan Tech and in NHL, Hockey Hall of Fame, at age 78 in Chicago
- August 15 - Leonard Thompson, Detroit Lions wide receiver 1975–1986, at age 69 in Phoenix
- August 19 - Bill Freehan, Detroit Tigers catcher 1961–1976, at age 79 in Walloon Lake, Michigan
- September 17 - Roger Brown, Detroit Lions defensive tackle 1960–1966 and 6x Pro Bowl, at age 84
- October 1 - Andrea Schroeder, member of the Michigan House of Representatives (since 2019), at age 57.
- October 13 - Dale Kildee, US Congressman 1977–2013, at age 92 in Arlington, Virginia
- October 16 - Dennis Franks, Michigan center (1971-1974) and NFL (1976-1979), at age 68 in McKeesport, Pennsylvania
- October 16 - Pat Studstill, Detroit Lions 1961–1967, 2x Pro Bowl, at age 83 in Los Angeles
- October 18 - William Lucking, actor (Sons of Anarchy) and native of Vicksburg, Michigan, at age 80 in Las Vegas
- October 26 - Mike Lucci, linebacker for Detroit Lions 1965–1973, at age 81 in Florida
- November 4
  - Barbara-Rose Collins, first black woman from Michigan elected to Congress, at age 82 in Detroit
  - Roger Zatkoff, linebacker at Michigan and in NFL, at age 90
- November 21 - Mary C. Brown, member of the Michigan House of Representatives (1977–1994), at age 86 in Kalamazoo
- November 23 - Bill Virdon, native of Hazel Park, Michigan, MLB center fielder and manager, at age 90 in Springfield, Missouri
- November 24 - Marilyn McLeod, singer, songwriter ("Love Hangover"), and Detroit native at age 82
- December 8 - Barry Harris, Detroit native, bebop pianist and composer, at age 91 in North Bergen, New Jersey
- December 15 - Wanda Young, member of The Marvelettes at age 78 in Garden City, Michigan
