= 2020 in Michigan =

- Decades: 2000s; 2010s; 2020s
- See also: History of Michigan; Historical outline of Michigan; List of years in Michigan; 2020 in the United States

Events from the year 2020 in Michigan.

Major stories in Michigan during 2020 included the COVID-19 pandemic in Michigan, the Gretchen Whitmer kidnapping plot, the George Floyd protests in Michigan, the Edenville Dam collapse and flooding, Gary Peters' victory over John E. James in the 2020 United States Senate election in Michigan, and Joe Biden's victory over Donald Trump in the 2020 United States presidential election in Michigan.

== Office holders ==
=== State office holders ===
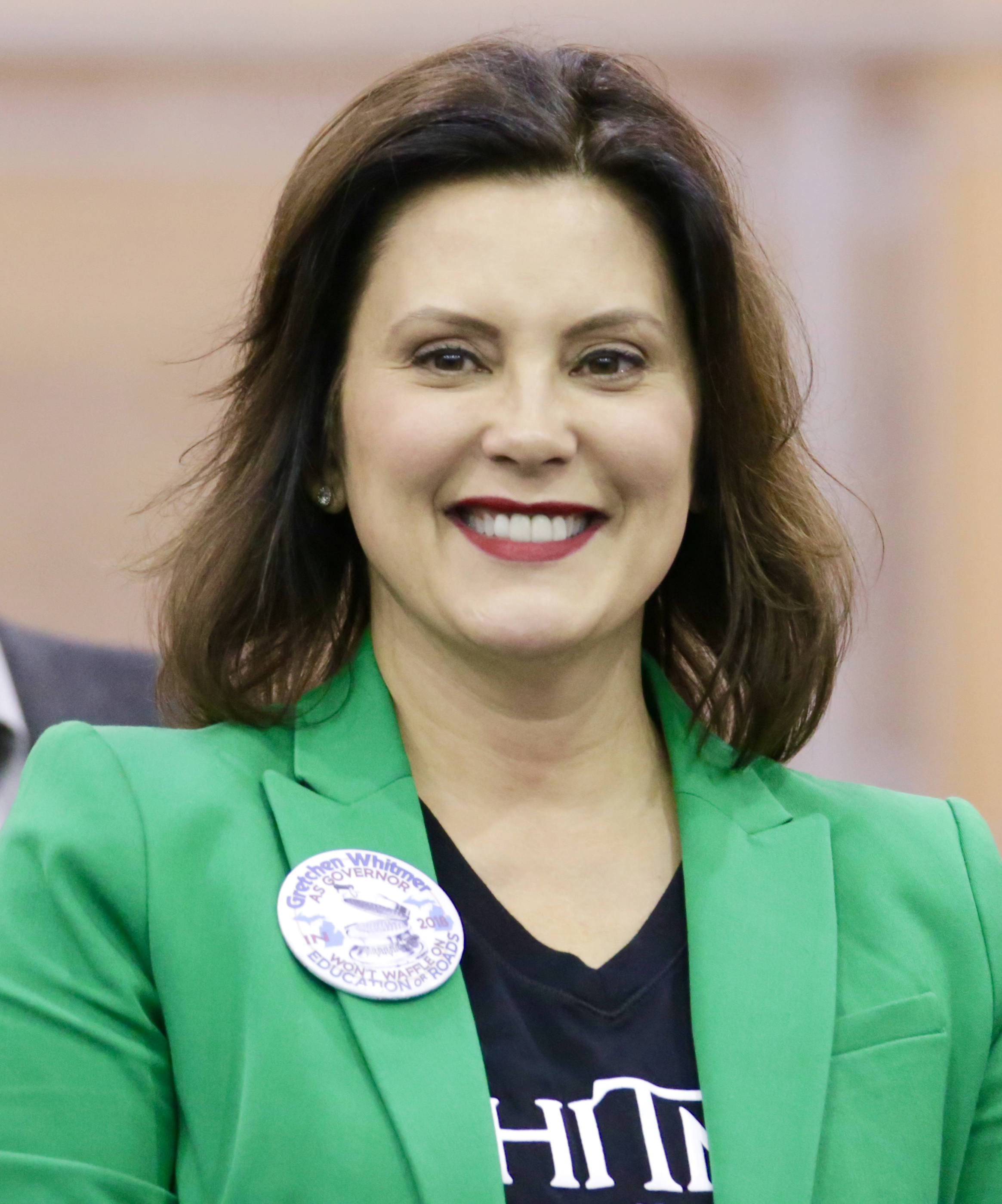
Gretchen Whitmer

- Governor of Michigan: Gretchen Whitmer (Democratic)
- Lieutenant Governor of Michigan: Garlin Gilchrist (Democratic)
- Michigan Attorney General: Dana Nessel (Democratic)
- Michigan Secretary of State: Jocelyn Benson (Democratic)
- Speaker of the Michigan House of Representatives: Lee Chatfield (Republican)
- Majority Leader of the Michigan Senate: Mike Shirkey (Republican)
- Chief Justice, Michigan Supreme Court: Bridget Mary McCormack

=== Mayors of major cities ===
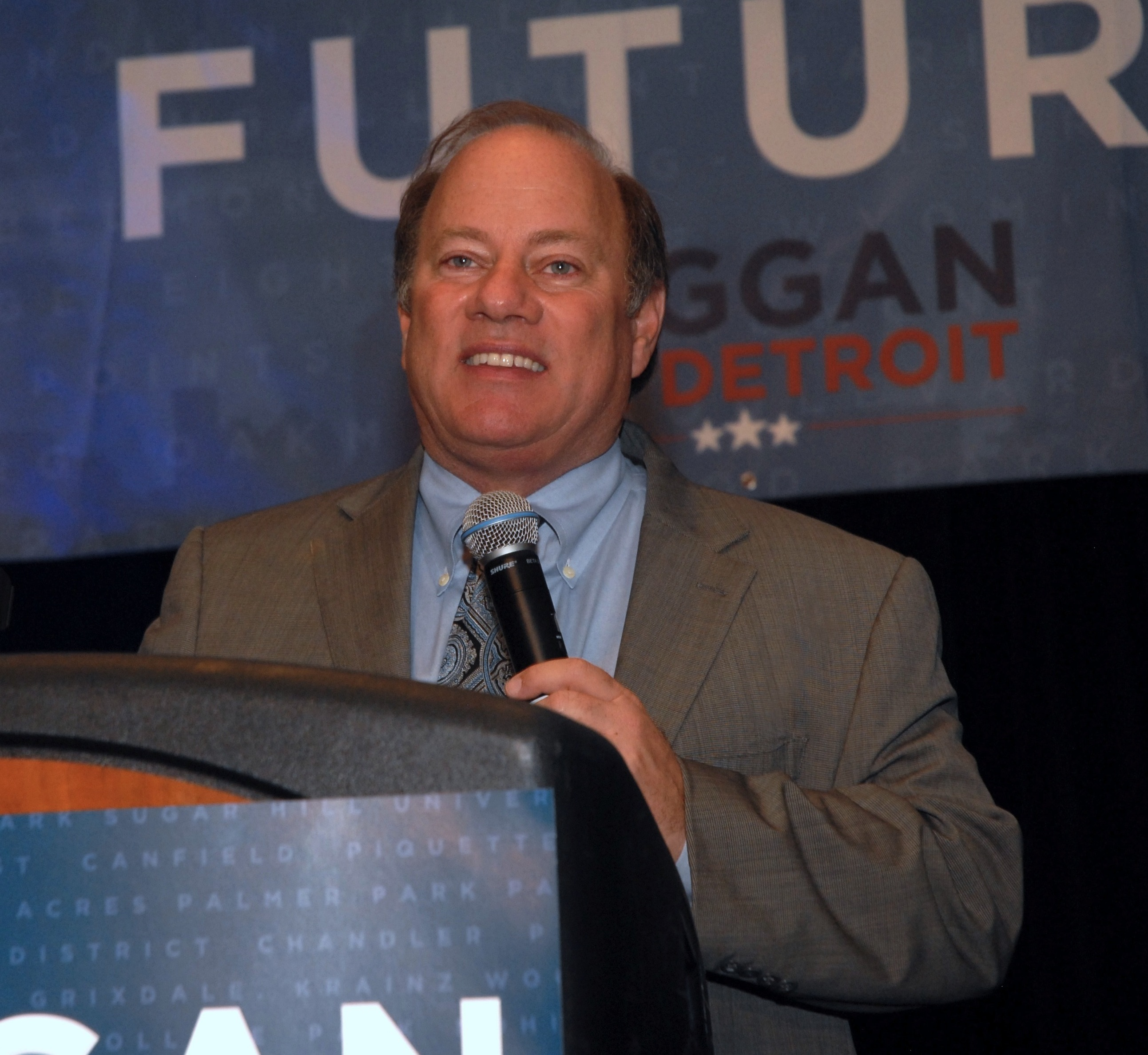
Mike Duggan

- Mayor of Detroit: Mike Duggan (Democrat)
- Mayor of Grand Rapids: Rosalynn Bliss
- Mayor of Warren, Michigan: James R. Fouts
- Mayor of Sterling Heights, Michigan: Michael C. Taylor
- Mayor of Ann Arbor: Christopher Taylor (Democrat)
- Mayor of Dearborn: John B. O'Reilly Jr.
- Mayor of Lansing: Andy Schor
- Mayor of Flint: Karen Weaver/Sheldon Neeley
- Mayor of Saginaw: Brenda Moore

=== Federal office holders ===
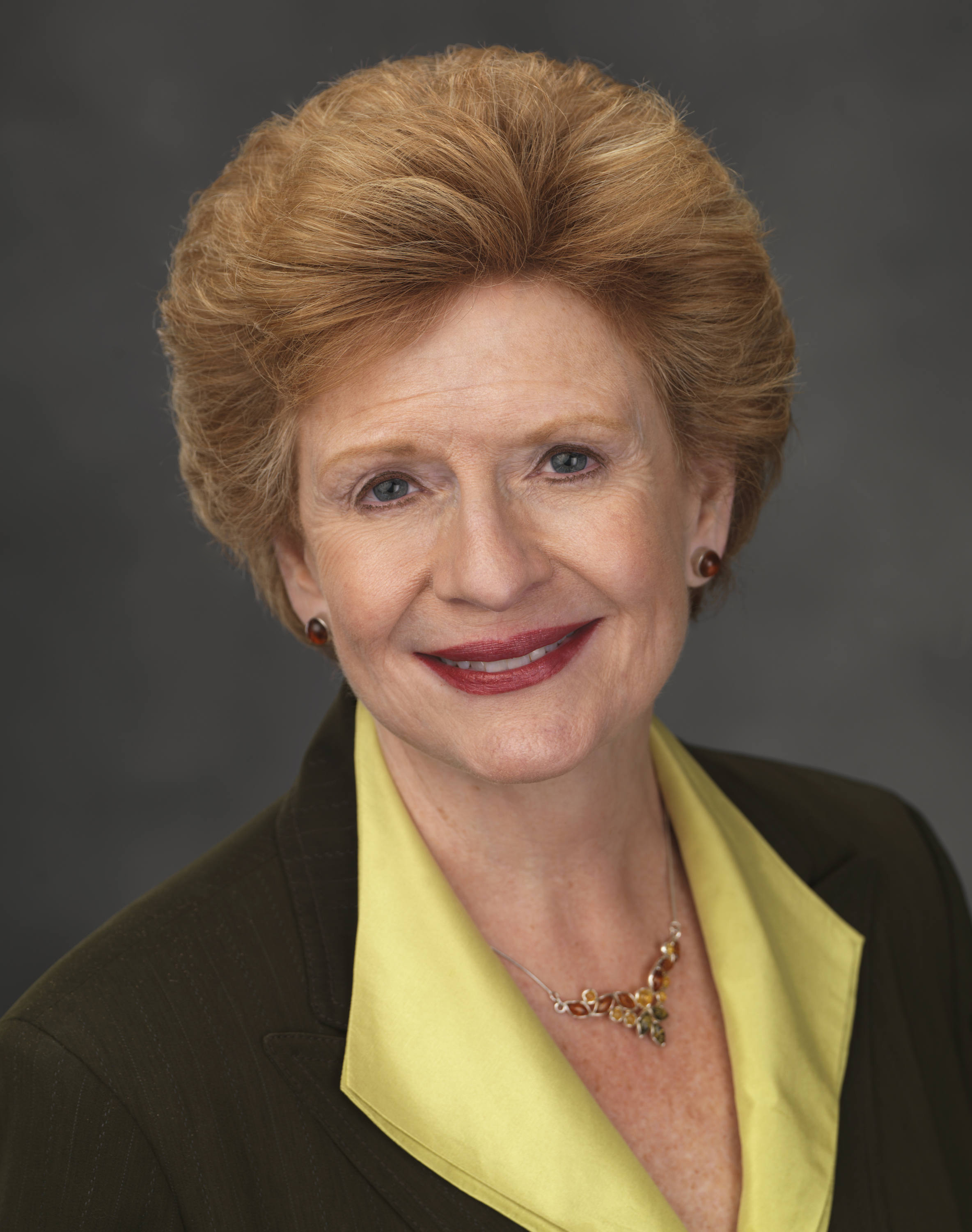
Debbie Stabenow

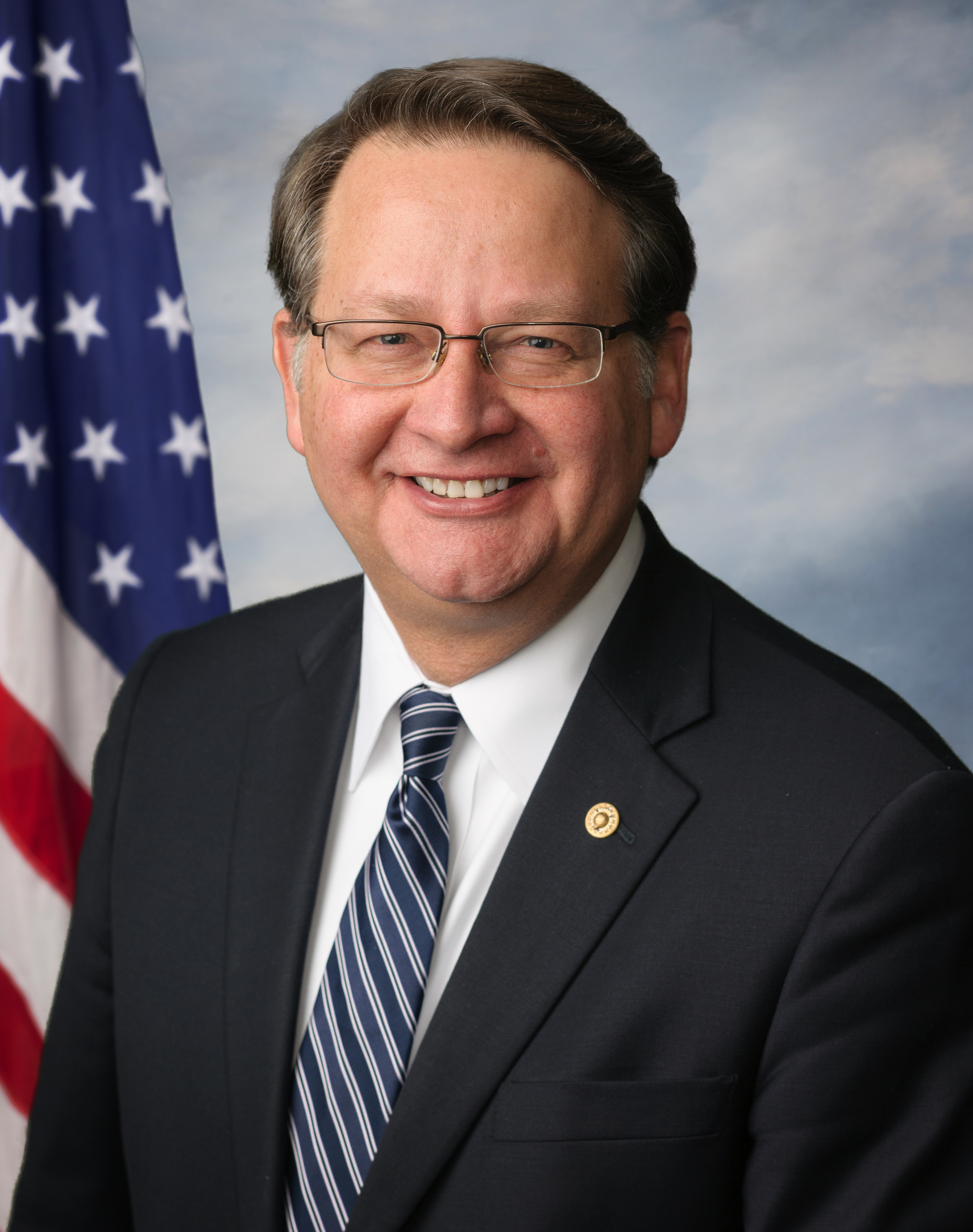
Gary Peters

- U.S. Senator from Michigan: Debbie Stabenow (Democrat)
- U.S. Senator from Michigan: Gary Peters (Democrat)
- House District 1: Jack Bergman (Republican)
- House District 2: Bill Huizenga (Republican)
- House District 3: Justin Amash (Libertarian)
- House District 4: John Moolenaar (Republican)
- House District 5: Dan Kildee (Democrat)
- House District 6: Fred Upton (Republican)
- House District 7: Tim Walberg (Republican)
- House District 8: Elissa Slotkin (Democrat)
- House District 9: Andy Levin (Democrat)
- House District 10: Paul Mitchell (Republican)
- House District 11: Haley Stevens (Democrat)
- House District 12: Debbie Dingell (Democrat)
- House District 13: Rashida Tlaib (Democrat)
- House District 14: Brenda Lawrence (Democrat)

== Population ==
In the 2020 United States Census, Michigan was recorded as having a population of 9,883,640 persons, ranking as the eighth most populous state in the country. By 2018, the state's population was estimated at 9,995,915, and the state had become the 10th most populous state.

The state's largest cities, having populations of at least 75,000 based on 2019 estimates, were as follows:

2019 rank	City	County	2010 pop. (est)	2019 pop.	Change 2010-19
1	Detroit	Wayne	713,777	670,031	−6.1% ▼
2	Grand Rapids	Kent	188,040	201,013	6.9% ▲
3	Warren	Macomb	134,056	133,943	−0.01% ▼
4	Sterling Heights	Macomb	129,699	132,438	2.1% ▲
5	Ann Arbor	Washtenaw	113,934	119,980	5.3% ▲
6	Lansing	Ingham	114,297	118,210	3.4% ▲
7	Flint	Genesee	102,434	95,538	−6.7% ▼
8	Dearborn	Wayne	98,153	93,932	−4.3% ▼
9	Livonia	Wayne	96,942	93,665	−3.4% ▼
10	Troy	Oakland	80,980	84,092	3.8% ▲
11	Westland	Wayne	84,094	81,511	−3.1% ▼
12	Farmington Hills	Oakland	79,740	80,612	1.1% ▲
13	Kalamazoo	Kalamazoo	74,262	76,200	2.6% ▲
14	Wyoming	Kent	72,125	75,667	4.9% ▲

== Sports ==
=== Baseball ===
- 2020 Detroit Tigers season – The Tigers compiled a 23–35 (.397) record and finished in last place in the American League Central Division. On September 19, Ron Gardenhire announced his retirement, effective immediately, for health reasons. Lloyd McClendon took over as interim head coach. The team's statistical leaders included Willi Castro with a .349 batting average. Miguel Cabrera with 10 home runs and 35 RBIs, and Spencer Turnbull with four pitching wins.

=== American football ===
- 2020 Detroit Lions season - On April 23, the Lions selected Ohio State cornerback Jeff Okudah with the third overall pick in the 2020 NFL draft. Matt Patricia was fired as the team's head coach following the team's loss on Thanksgiving Day. He was replaced by Darrell Bevell and then Robert Prince who served as interim head coaches. The team compiled a 5–11 record and finished in fourth place in the NFC North.
- 2020 Michigan Wolverines football team - Under head coach Jim Harbaugh, the Wolverines compiled a 2–4 record. The team's statistical leaders included Joe Milton with 1,077 passing yards, Hassan Haskins with 375 rushing yards and 36 points scored, and Ronnie Bell with 401 receiving yards.
- 2020 Michigan State Spartans football team - Under first year head coach Mel Tucker, the Spartans compiled a 2–5 record. The team's statistical leaders included Rocky Lombardi with 1,090 passing yards, Jordan Simmons with 219 rushing yards, Jalen Nailor with 515 receiving yards, and Matt Coghlin with 40 points scored.
- 2020 Central Michigan Chippewas football team - Under head coach Jim McElwain, the Chippewas compiled a 3–3 record.
- 2020 Eastern Michigan Eagles football team - Under head coach Chris Creighton, the Eagles compiled a 2–4 record.
- 2020 Western Michigan Broncos football team - Led by head coach Tim Lester, the Broncos compiled a 4–2 record.

=== Basketball ===
- 2019–20 Detroit Pistons season – Under head coach Dwane Casey, the Pistons compiled a 20–46 record. The team's leaders included Derrick Rose with 904 points (18.1 points per game) and 278 assists and Andre Drummond with 775 rebounds. The Pistons did not qualify to participate in the 2020 NBA Bubble.
- 2019–20 Michigan Wolverines men's basketball team – Under first-year head coach Juwan Howard, the Wolverines compiled a 19–12 record.
- 2019–20 Michigan State Spartans men's basketball team – Under head coach Tom Izzo, the Spartans compiled a 22–9 record and were ranked No. 9 in the AP Poll when the season was suspended.
- 2019–20 Michigan Wolverines women's basketball team – Under head coach Kim Barnes Arico, the Wolverines compiled a 21–11 record.
- 2019–20 Michigan State Spartans women's basketball team – Under head coach Suzy Merchant, the Spartans compiled a 16–14 record.

=== Ice hockey ===
- 2019–20 Detroit Red Wings season – Under head coach Jeff Blashill, the Wings compiled a 17–49–5 record. The team's leaders included Tyler Bertuzzi with 21 goals and Dylan Larkin with 34 assists and 53 points scored.
- 2019–20 Michigan Wolverines men's ice hockey season – Under head coach Mel Pearson, the Wolverines compiled an 18–14–4 record.

== Chronology of events ==
=== January ===
- January 1 - Michigan lost to Alabama, 35–16, in the 2020 Citrus Bowl.
- January 15 - Former Detroit Lions star Alex Karras (1958-1970) selected to the Pro Football Hall of Fame
- January 17 - Michigan State's Cassius Winston broke the Big Ten career record for assists
- January 21 - State Senator Mallory McMorrow charged fellow Senator Peter Lucido with sexual harassment during orientation for new legislators.
- January 21 - Kalamazoo native Derek Jeter elected to the Baseball Hall of Fame
- January 22 - Detroit Symphony Orchestra hired Jader Bignamini as its musical director
- January 22 - Detroit's Atwater Brewery acquired by Molson Coors
- January 24 - Michigan health officials reported that three Michiganders were undergoing testing for suspicion of having coronavirus
- January 27 - General Motors announced plans to invest $2.2 billion to convert its Detroit-Hamtramck assembly plant into the company's first all-electric vehicle plant.
- January 30 - President Trump visited a Warren automobile plant and touted the new North American trade deal

=== February ===
- February 4 - Michigan State football coach Mark Dantonio announced his retirement
- February 6 - Detroit Pistons traded Andre Drummond to the Cleveland Cavaliers
- February 7 - Jim Farley promoted to chief operating officer of Ford Motor Company
- February 10 - Luke Fickell turned down offer to become Michigan State's head football coach
- February 12 - Mel Tucker hired as Michigan State's head football coach
- February 14 - Former Michigan State gymnastics coach Kathie Klages found guilty by a Lansing jury of lying to police in connection with complaints about Larry Nassar in the USA Gymnastics sex abuse scandal
- February 21 - Michigan health officials reported that 325 Michiganders were being monitored for coronavirus
- February 27 - The last Chevy Impala rolled off the line at the Detroit-Hamtramck plant as the company closed the plant to retool for production of electric vehicles.
- February - Revelations of sexual misconduct by University of Michigan doctor Robert Anderson dating to the 1960s; more than 100 complaints lodged after hotlines opened February 19

=== March ===
- March 2 - Fears of coronavirus spur stockpiling and shortages of products
- March 5 - Michigan Governor Gretchen Whitmer endorsed Joe Biden for the Democratic presidential nomination
- March 5 - Former UAW president Gary Jones charged with embezzlement and racketeering
- March 5 - A federal judge approved a class action settlement providing for Ford to repurchase thousands of Fiesta and Focus automobiles
- March 10 -
  - Joe Biden defeated Bernie Sanders in the 2020 Michigan Democratic primary by a margin of 52.93% to 36.34%.
  - Democrat Cynthia Neeley defeats Republican Adam Ford in the Michigan House of Representatives special election held to fill the vacancy made by Sheldon Neeley's resignation from the seat representing the 34th district.
- March 11 - After the first two confirmed cases of coronavirus in Michigan, Governor Whitmer urged frequent handwashing and urged cancellation of gatherings of more than 100 persons.
- March 12 - NCAA, NHL, MLB cancel games due to coronavirus
- March 13 - Governor Whitmer ordered closure of K-12 schools statewide due to coronavirus; Michigan's total confirmed coronavirus cases reached 16
- March 17 - Governor Whitmer ordered closure until March 30 of the state's bars, restaurants, gyms, spas, theaters, and other public spaces
- March 18 - First Michigan coronavirus death is a Southgate man in his 50s. Border between US and Canada closed to non-essential vehicles. UAW and Detroit's Big Three auto makers agreed to shut down North American car production.
- March 19 - Michigan reports total of 334 cases of coronavirus and three deaths
- March 22 - As Michigan's confirmed coronavirus exceeds 1,000 with nine deaths, Gov Whitmer defended her decision not to order a statewide stay-at-home order similar to Ohio
- March 23 - Governor Whitmer issued statewide order for non-essential personnel to stay at home until April 13
- March 25 - Beaumont Hospital says it faces "biological tsunami" as it added 100 new coronavirus patients per day
- March 26 - Detroit and Wayne County declared a coronavirus hotspot with 1,389 cases and 26 deaths countywide. Governor Whitmer sought declaration from President Trump declaring Michigan a major disaster area.
- March 27 - President Trump invoked Defense Production Act to order General Motors to produce ventilators. Detroit Police chief James Craig tested positive for coronavirus.
- March 28 - President Trump criticized Governor Whitmer, referring to her as "a woman governor" and saying "all she does is sit there and blame the federal government". Trump also approved Michigan's disaster declaration.
- March 30 - Oakland County saw spike in coronavirus cases to 1,391 with 59 deaths. Governor Whitmer ordered $80 million cuts in state spending not related to coronavirus
- March 31 - Detroit's TCF Center converted into a 1,000-bed hospital. Michigan's coronavirus death total reached 259 with 7,615 cases

=== April ===
- April 1 - Governor Whitmer declared a state of disaster and asked the legislature to extend the state of emergency for 70 additional days
- April 2 - Governor Whitmer ordered closure of the state's schools for the remainder of the school year
- April 4 - Former University of Michigan star Rudy Tomjanovich elected to the Basketball Hall of Fame
- April 5 - Michigan's coronavirus toll reached 14,225 cases and 540 deaths
- April 6 - Al Kaline died at age 85 at his home in Bloomfield Hills
- April 6 - Former Detroit Lions players Calvin Johnson and Ndamukong Suh named to the National Football League 2010s All-Decade Team
- April 7 - The Michigan Legislature extended the State's emergency declaration through April 30
- April 8 - General Motors received $489 million contract to manufacture ventilator to respond to the COVID crisis
- April 9 - Governor Whitmer extended stay-at-home order to May 1 and banned travel between multiple homes
- April 10 - Michigan's coronavirus toll reached 22,783 cases and 1,281 deaths
- April 15 - Protests against the Governor's stay-at-home order at the Michigan State Capitol building.
- April 17 - President Trump tweeted a message to "Liberate Michigan!" The tweet was criticized as incitement of insurrection.
- April 23 - The Detroit Lions selected cornerback Jeff Okudah in the first round (third overall pick) of the 2020 NFL draft.
- April 24 - Governor Whitmer extended her stay-at-home order until May 15.
- April 26 - Michigan's coronavirus toll reached 37,778 cases and 3,315 deaths
- April 28 - Michigan Congressman Justin Amash announced he was launching an exploratory committee to seek the Libertarian Party's presidential nomination. On May 16, he announced that he had decided against running for president. He wrote: After much reflection, I've concluded that circumstances don't lend themselves to my success as a candidate for president this year, and therefore I will not be a candidate."
- April 30 - Protesters, some armed, gathered at the Michigan Capitol in Lansing to urge an end to Michigan's state of emergency

=== May ===
- May 1 - Calvin Munerlyn, a security guard at a Family Dollar store, was shot and killed after denying access to a woman with no mask.
- May 7 - Governor Whitmer extended the state's stay-home order through May 28 but provided for automobile plants to open May 18.
- May 8 - Michigan's coronavirus toll reached 46,326 cases and 4,393 deaths
- May 13 - A judge in Eaton County dismissed charges against former Michigan State University President Lou Anna Simon for lying to police in connection with the Larry Nassar sex abuse scandal.
- May 18 - Manufacturing operations resumed at Michigan's automobile plants.
- May 19 - Michigan Secretary of State Jocelyn Benson announced that all 7.7 million registered voters in Michigan would be mailed absentee ballot applications enabling them to participate in August and November elections. President Trump threatened to cut off funding to the state in response to the move.
- May 20 - Failure of the Edenville Dam results in flooding in Midland, Michigan. The flood caused damages estimated at $175 million. The State of Michigan sued the dam's owner to recover the expenses related to the flooding.
- May 21 - President Trump visited a Ford Motor factory in Ypsilanti. Ford Executive Chairman Bill Ford asked that he wear a mask, and Trump complied for non-public portions of the plant tour.
- May 29 to June 7 - The George Floyd protests in Michigan took place in Detroit, and eventually 15 other Michigan cities, following the murder of George Floyd in Minneapolis.

=== June ===
- June 1 - Governor Whitmer lifted the stay-at-home order and announced that restaurants and bars could reopen at 50% capacity starting June 8.
- June 10 - The Detroit Tigers selected Spencer Torkelson with the first pick in the 2020 Major League Baseball draft.
- June 12 - Governor Whitmer lifted bans on overnight camps and some K-12 sports and extracurricular activities.
- June 15 - Michigan's COVID-19 toll stood at 5,772 deaths and 60,064 cases.
- June 18 - Governor Whitmer announced that Michigan's schools would re-open for in-person learning in the fall. her plan for reopening was unveiled on June 30.
- June 19 - Federal judge Paul Lewis Maloney overrode Governor Whitmer's emergency order on closure of gyms. The effectiveness of the order was delayed five days later.
- June 22 - The University of Michigan announced that it would bring its students back to campus in the fall.
- June 23 - Sheila Ford Hamp was named as the new owner of the Detroit Lions.
- June 24 - Former Detroit Red Wings general manager Ken Holland was elected to the Hockey Hall of Fame.
- June 25 - Ford unveiled its new F-150 truck with a new body design.
- June 26 - President Trump, speaking on Fox News, said of Detroit and two other cities, "these cities, it's like living in hell."
- June 28 - Detroit police officers accelerated through a crowd of demonstrators and then left the scene. Police Chief James Craig stated that the officers believed they had been shot at.
- June 29 - Emoni Bates, rated as the best high school basketball player in the country, committed to Michigan State.
- June 30 - Governor Whitmer announced that Lansing's Lewis Cass Building, a historic state government office building listed on the National Register of Historic Places, would be renamed as the Elliott-Larsen Building, due to the fact that Lewis Cass had been a slave owner.

=== July ===
- July 1 - In response to an increase in the spread of coronavirus, Governor Whitmer announced the closure of indoor bar service in south and central Michigan. The decision follows a spike of 170 cases tied to Harper's Restaurant and Brew Pub in East Lansing.
- July 1 - Michigan's coronavirus totals stood at 5,951 deaths and 64,132 cases.
- July 3 - A study was published based on a study conducted at Henry Ford Health System, finding that treatment of coronavirus patients with hydroxychloroquine resulted in a significant reduction of the death rate. President Trump tweeted in support of the Henry Ford study on July 6. Later in the month, Dr. Tony Fauci testified before Congress that the study was flawed and had "a number of issues", including the fact that it was not a randomized, double-blind study.
- July 9 - The Big Ten Conference announced a plan to limit sports competition for the fall semester to games against other conference opponents.
- July 10 - The fatal police shooting of Hakim Littleton in Detroit led to protests over the next two days.
- July 10 - Governor Whitmer expanded the state's mask requirement, requiring, among other things, any business open to the public to refuse entry to those not wearing a mask and making violations a misdemeanor with a $500 fine.
- July 14 - Sean Ernest Ruis of Grand Ledge was shot and killed by an Eaton County deputy after Ruis stabbed a 77-year-old man who confronted Ruis at a Quality Dairy store for not wearing a mask.
- July 17 - Congressman Justin Amash, a critic of President Trump, announced he would not seek reelection.
- July 20 - President Trump announced that he was considering sending federal law enforcement officers into Detroit and other cities. Governor Whitmer responded: "Quite frankly, the president doesn't know the first thing about Detroit. . . . There is no reason for the president to send federal troops into a city where people are demanding change peacefully and respectfully."
- July 27 - The Detroit Tigers lost their home opener to the Kansas City Royals, 14–6. The game was played without spectators at Comerica Park.
- July 29 - General Motors announced an $800 million loss in the second quarter, a result that was better than analysts had projected.
- July 30 - Ford Motor Co. announced a $1.9 billion loss in the second quarter.
- July 30 - A lawsuit filed by a former U-M student alleged that Bo Schembechler knew about sexual assaults by football team doctor Robert Anderson.
- July 31 - Fiat Chrysler announced a $1.2 billion loss in the second quarter.

=== August ===
- August 1 - Michigan's coronavirus cases totaled 82,356 with 6,206 deaths
- August 2 - Michigan State Senator Tom Barrett, who gained notoriety for his opposition to Governor Whitmer's use of emergency powers during the coronavirus pandemic, announced that he had tested positive for the virus.
- August 4 - Ford Motor Co. announced the retirement of CEO Jim Hackett and the promotion of Jim Farley as the new CEO.
- August 8 - The Mid-American Conference announced the cancellation of its 2020 football season.
- August 11 - The Big Ten Conference announced the cancellation of its fall sports season.
- August 11 - Mike Duggan announced that the old Michigan State Fairgrounds would be redeveloped as an $3.8-million-square-foot Amazon distribution center.
- August 18 - Michigan State University announced that it would conduct the fall semester with online-only instruction due to coronavirus concerns.
- August 19 - Casey Mize made his major league debut with the Detroit Tigers.
- August 19 - Kamala Harris, Democratic vice presidential candidates, campaigned in Detroit.
- August 23 - Detroit police arrested 42 persons in connection with protests arising out of the July 10 shooting of a Detroit man.
- August 24 - A stretch of the Lodge Freeway was renamed the Aretha L. Franklin Memorial Highway.
- August 27 - Prosecutors charged former UAW president Dennis Williams with conspiracy to embezzle union funds.
- August 31 - The Detroit Tigers traded outfielder Cameron Maybin to the Chicago Cubs in exchange for infield prospect Zack Short, striking out seven and walking none in a 5–4 loss to the Chicago White Sox.

=== September ===
- September 1 - Michigan's coronavirus cases totaled 103,186 with 6,495 deaths.

=== October ===
- October 8 - The FBI announced 13 arrests in the Gretchen Whitmer kidnapping plot.
- October 15 - A 14th suspect is arrested in the alleged plot to kidnap Gretchen Whitmer.

=== November ===
- November 3
  - In the 2020 United States presidential election in Michigan, Joe Biden defeated Donald Trump by totals of 2,804,040 votes (50.62%) to 2,649,852 votes (47.84%).
  - In the 2020 United States Senate election in Michigan, Democratic incumbent Gary Peters defeated Republican challenger John E. James by totals of 2,734,568 votes (49.9%) to 2,642,233 votes (48.2%).
  - In the 2020 United States House of Representatives elections in Michigan, the Republican Party gained one seat as Republican Peter Meijer was elected in District 3, a seat previously held by Libertarian Justin Amash.
- November 17 - After two Republican members of the Wayne County Board of Canvassers voted against certifying the county's November election results, the board voted unanimously to certify the results. Wayne County's vote tally had favored Joe Biden by more than 300,000 votes, and an unprecedented refusal to certify would have thrown Biden's electoral victory in Michigan into jeopardy.
- November 20 - Michigan Senate Majority Leader Mike Shirkey and House Speaker Lee Chatfield reaffirm that the state will honor their votes after telling President Donald Trump in a meeting at the White House that there was no reason that the state's election results would change.
- November 23 - The Michigan Board of State Canvassers votes 3–0 to certify the state results of the presidential election, with Norm Shinkle abstaining.

=== December ===
- December 2 - Rudy Giuliani, counsel for President Donald Trump, presented allegations of election fraud to members of Michigan's House Oversight Committee in Lansing. He was accompanied by Melissa Carone, who claimed that 30,000 votes were counted multiple times, and Jessy Jacob, who claimed to have knowledge about improper backdating of absentee ballots. The hearing was satirized on December 5 broadcast of Saturday Night Live cold open with Kate McKinnon portraying Giuliani and Cecily Strong as Carone.
- December 8 - Michigan recorded its 10,000th death from COVID-19.
- December 8 - The University of Michigan announced the cancellation of the annual football game with Ohio State due to multiple positive COVID-19 test result. At least 40 players were expected to miss the game due to positive tests, contact tracing, or other injuries. The game was not played for the first time in 103 years.
- December 14 - The first COVID-19 vaccine in Michigan was administered to Dr. Marc McClelland, a Grand Rapids pulmonologist.
- December 15 - Former Michigan Governor Jennifer Granholm was nominated by President elect Joe Biden as United States Secretary of Energy.
- December 22 - The University of Michigan, after a losing season for the football team, fired defensive coordinator Don Brown.
- December 31 - Michigan ends the year having sustained more than 12,000 COVID-19 deaths and more than 488,000 cases of the disease.

== Deaths ==
- January 7 - George Perles, former Michigan State football coach, at age 85 in East Lansing
- January 9 - Pampero Firpo, mainstay of Big Time Wrestling in Detroit during the 1970s, at age 89 in San Jose, California
- January 18 - Jack Van Impe, televangelist, at age 88 in Royal Oak
- February 17 - Owen Bieber, former UAW president (1983-1995), at age 90 in Grand Rapids
- March 2 - James Lipton, Detroit native and longtime host of the Bravo cable television series Inside the Actors Studio, at age 93 in New York
- March 4 - Barbara Martin, one of the original members of the Motown group The Supremes, at age 76 in Detroit
- March 17 - Roger Mayweather, Grand Rapids native and former welterweight boxing champion, at age 58 in Las Vegas
- March 29 - Isaac Robinson, member of the Michigan House of Representative, at age 44, suspected to have died from COVID-19
- April 6 - Al Kaline, Detroit Tigers right fielder (1953-1974), at age 85 at his home in Bloomfield Hills
- April 7 - Steve Farmer, guitarist, composer and lyricist, co-writer of "Journey to the Center of the Mind", and member of The Amboy Dukes, at age 71 in Redford
- April 9 - Jim Conacher, player for Detroit Red Wings (1945-1949), at age 98 in Vancouver, British Columbia
- May 4 - Don Shula, defensive coordinator of the Detroit Lions (1961-1962), at age 90 in Florida
- May 12 - Morris Hood III, member of the Michigan House of Representatives (2003-2008), Michigan state senator (2011-2018), at age 54 from COVID-19
- July 12 - Matty Moroun, billionaire owner of the Ambassador Bridge, at age 93 in Detroit
- July 16 - Tony Taylor, Detroit Tigers second baseman 1971–1973, in Miami at age 84
- August 9 - Kurt Luedtke, former executive editor of the Detroit Free Press and Oscar-winning screenwriter of Out of Africa, at age 80 in Royal Oak.
- November 29 - Tom Casperson, former state senator representing the Upper Peninsula, at age 61 due to lung cancer
- December 2 - Joseph L. Hudson Jr., longtime CEO of Detroit department store and philanthropist, at age 89
- December 13 - Sal Rocca, former member of the Michigan House of Representatives (1975-1980, 1983-1992, 1993-1994, 2001-2004), at age 74 due to COVID-19
- December 17 - Benny Napoleon, Wayne County Sheriff from 2009 to 2020, in Detroit at age 65 due to COVID-19
- December 29 - Daniel S. Paletko, mayor of Dearborn Heights and former state representative, at age 70 due to COVID-19

=== Gallery of 2020 deaths ===
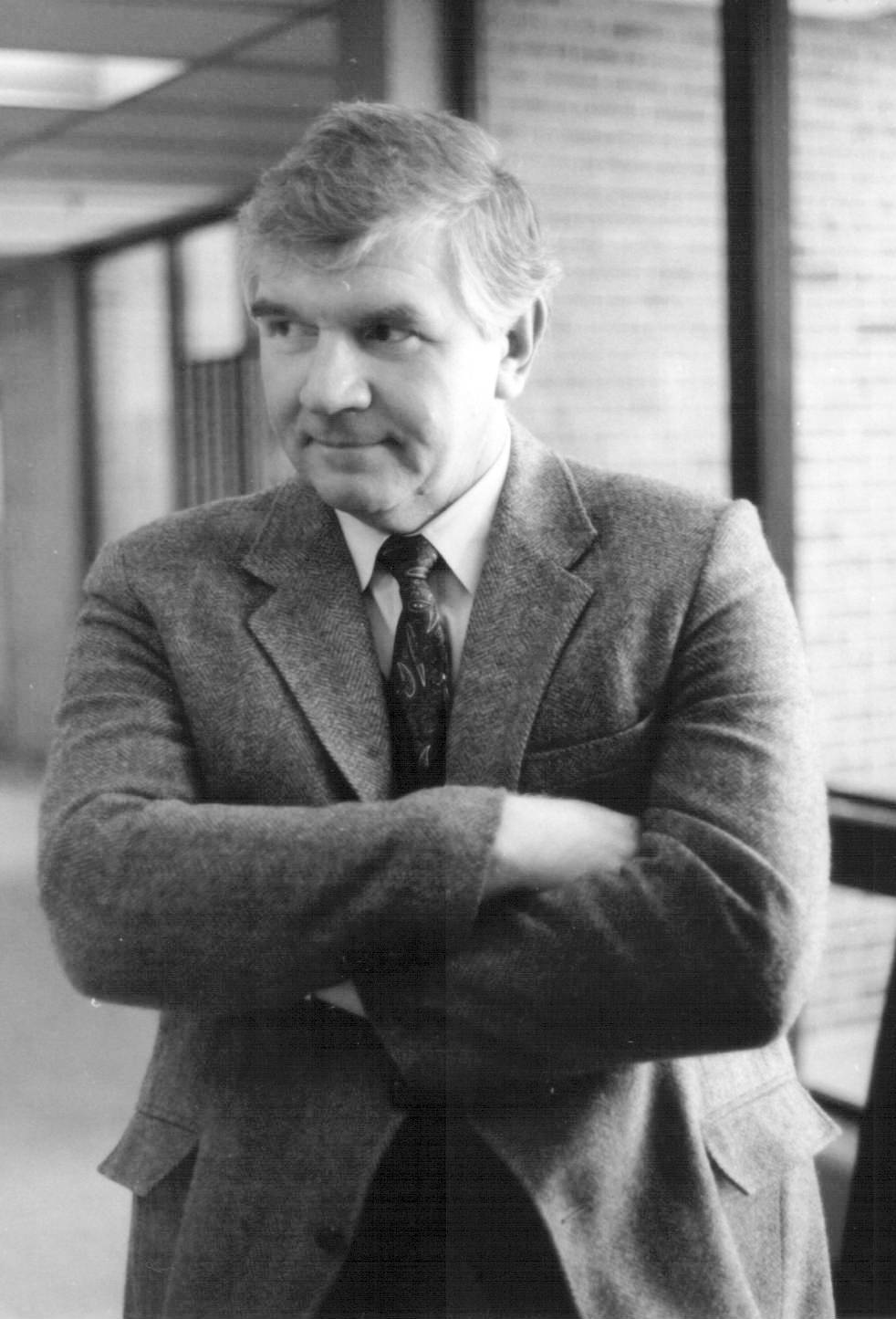
George Perles

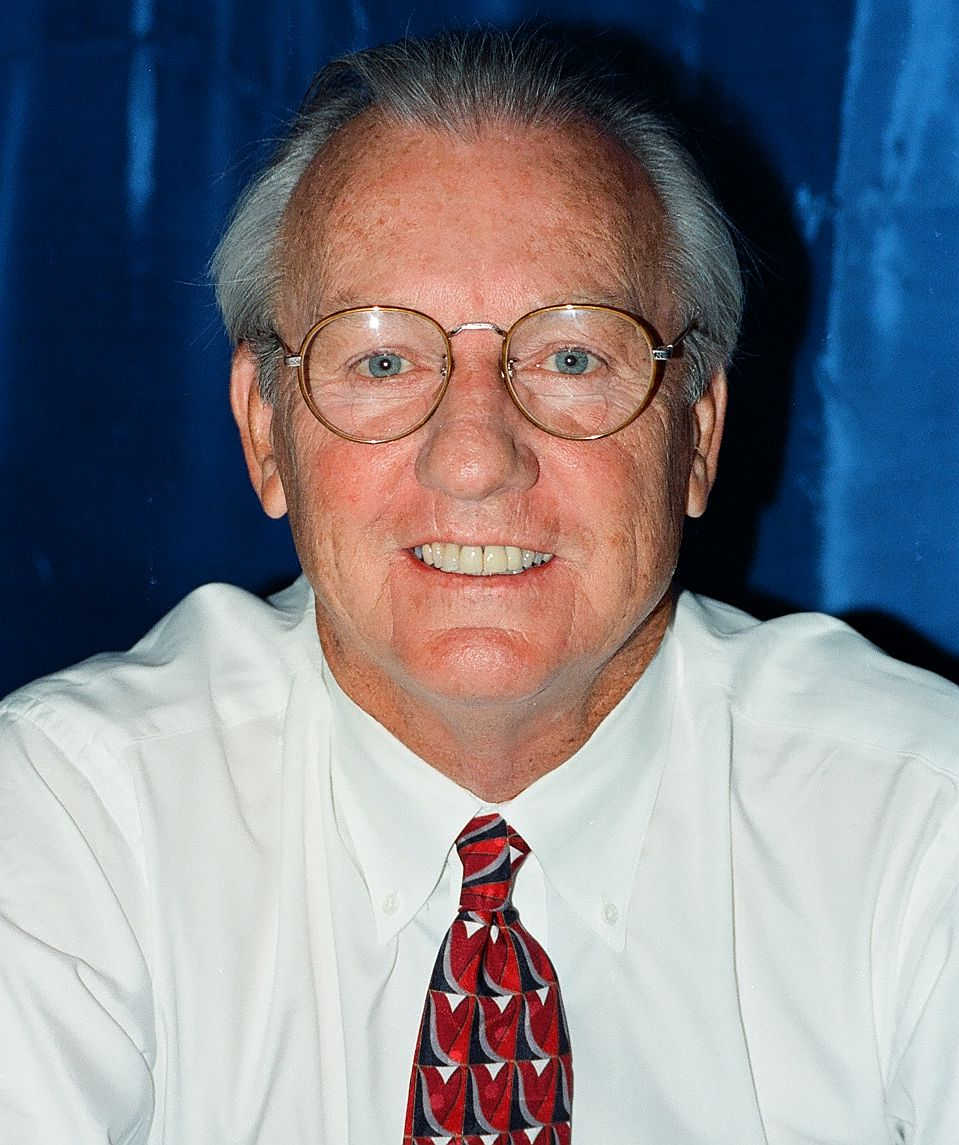
Al Kaline

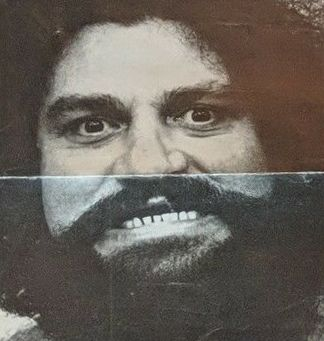
Pampero Firpo

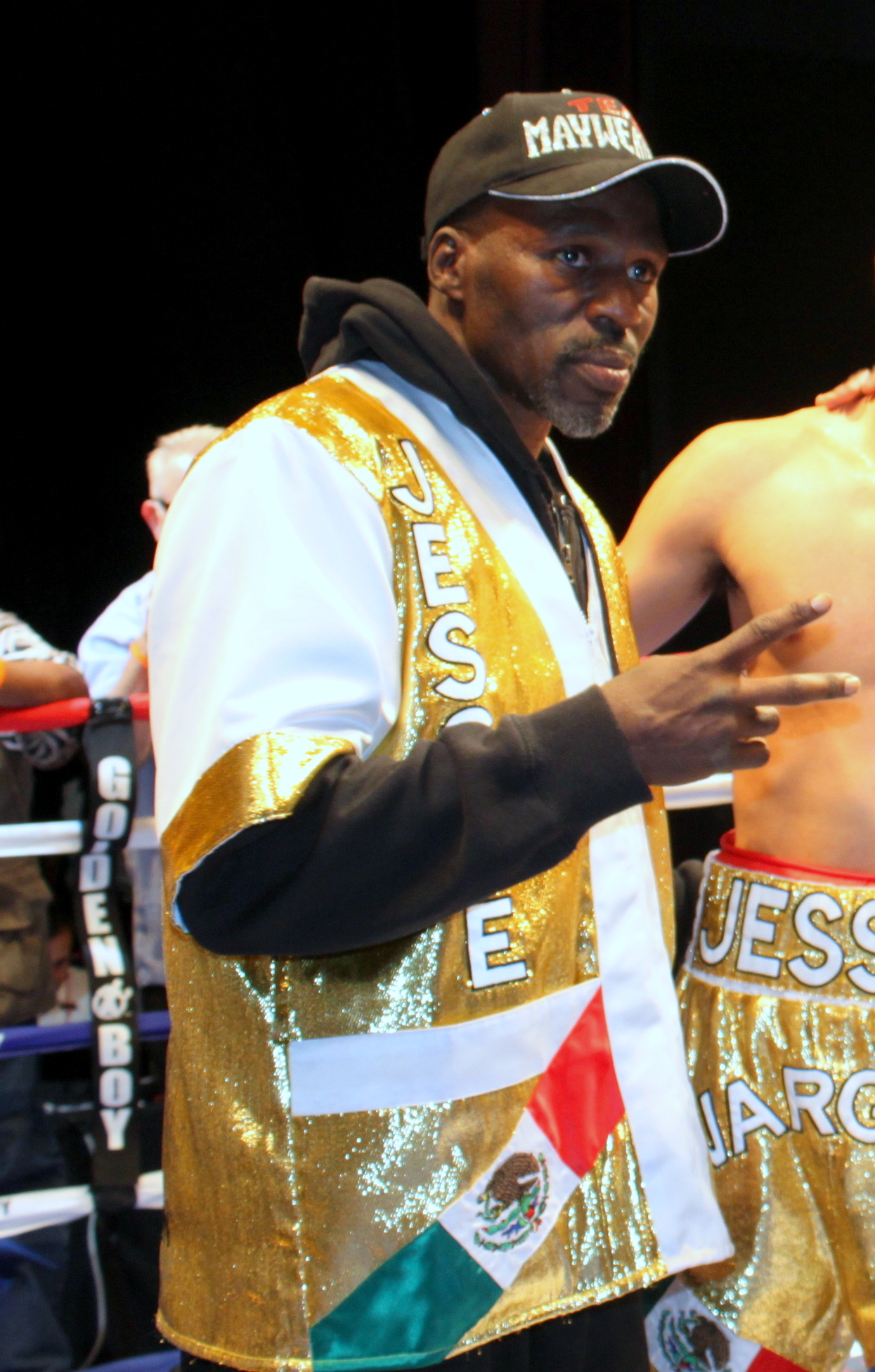
Roger Mayweather

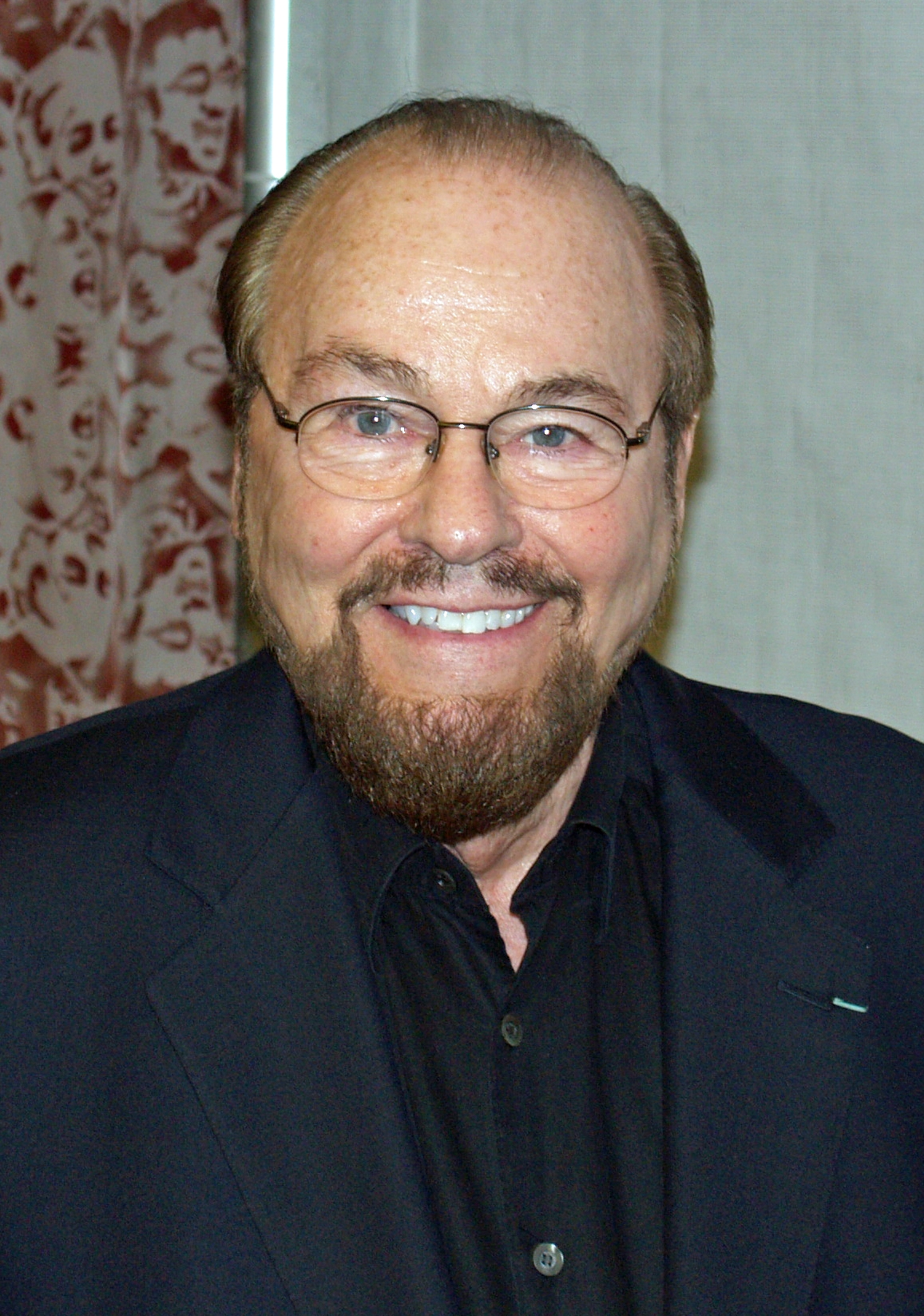
James Lipton
