= Isaac Agree Downtown Synagogue =

Synagogue in Detroit, Michigan, US

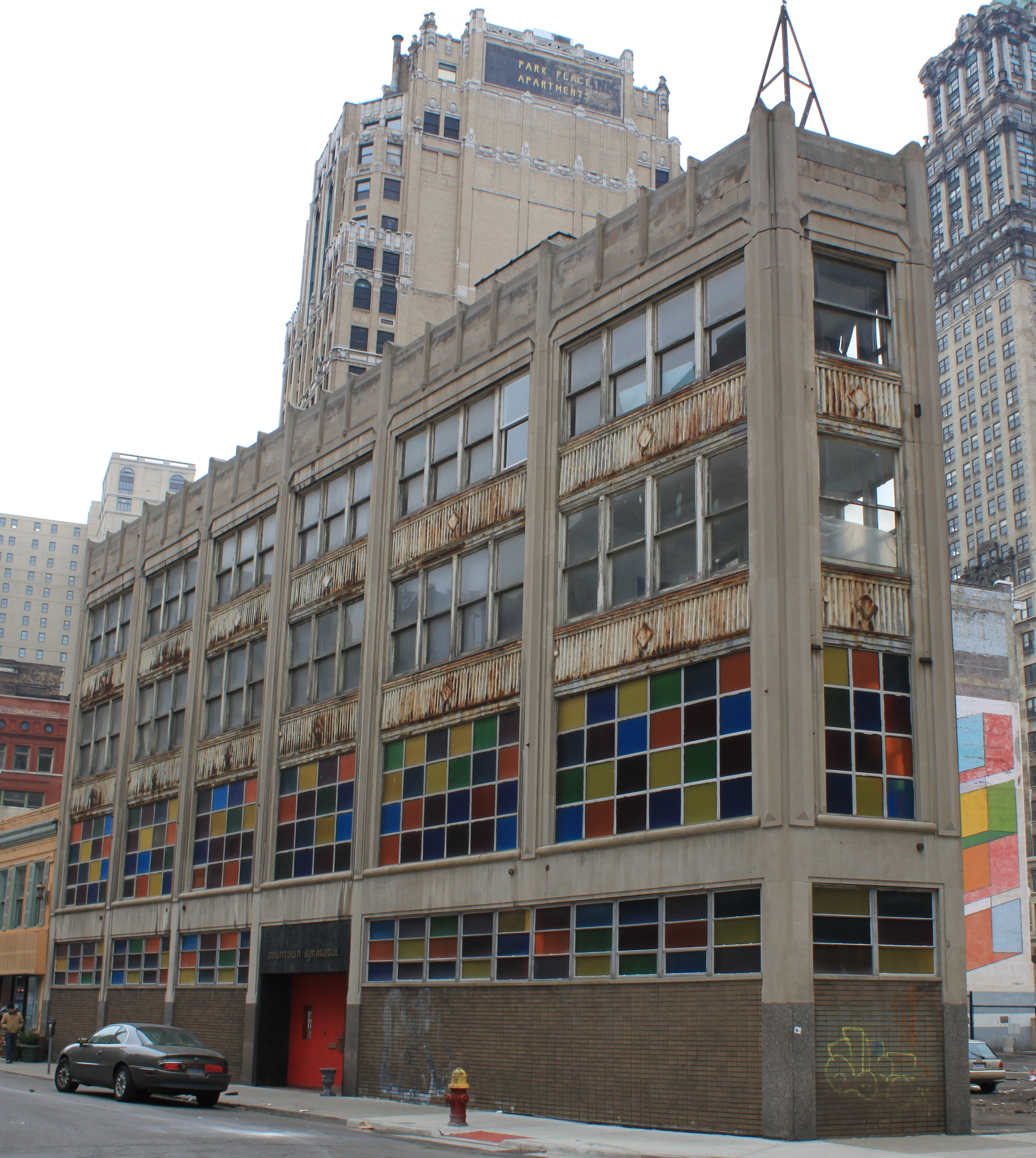
- The synagogue, in 2011

- Location in Michigan

Religion
- Affiliation: Judaism
- Rite: (Non-denominational)
- Ecclesiastical or organisational status: Synagogue
- Leadership: Rabbi Ariana Silverman
- Status: Active

Location
- Location: 1457 Griswold Street, Detroit, Michigan
- Country: United States
- Coordinates: 42°20′04″N 83°03′01″W

Architecture
- Founder: Isaac Agree Memorial Society
- Established: 1921 (as a congregation)
- Completed: early 1960s

Website
- downtownsynagogue.org

The Isaac Agree Downtown Synagogue is a non-denominational Jewish congregation and synagogue, located at 1457 Griswold Street in Detroit, Michigan, in the United States. The Reconstructionist Congregation of Detroit holds services jointly with the Isaac Agree Synagogue.

Rabbi Ariana Silverman has served as its rabbi since 2016.

== History ==
The Isaac Agree Memorial Society was formed in 1921 by the Agree, Canvasser, Kaplan, Rosin, and Zatkin families. The synagogue went through two periods when it did not own a permanent building. The congregation purchased its location on Griswold Street and Clifford Street, its third home, from the former Fintex department store in the early 1960s. In the past, the congregation had hundreds of members, joined by Jewish businessmen visiting and working in the city.

In 2000, the congregation drew 25 to 30 worshipers for Shabbat services on Saturday mornings. Six hundred worshipers attended the synagogue's High Holiday services in 2007, which were open to all. In 2008 the Shabbat morning prayer services were the only weekly scheduled services offered by the synagogue; however, by 2014 the weekly offerings expanded to include Thursday morning and Friday evening services.

As of 2008, patrons and staff of a neighboring club had together developed a plan to help revitalize the synagogue. A contractor estimated that it would cost US$450,000 to repair the building and convert the top two floors into living and work space. The group approached the board with the proposal.

In 2022, the synagogue marked its centennial with a block party and groundbreaking on a US$5 million project to expand and renovate its building, which had been in poor condition and lacked office space for the synagogue's five full-time staff. The building reopened in August 2023 and houses offices for several local Jewish nonprofit organizations, along with a community gathering space, and a newly renovated sanctuary.

As of 2023, the synagogue is the last in Detroit city limits. It had a membership of 425 families.

On October 21, 2023, Samantha Woll, the synagogue's president, was found stabbed to death outside her home in Lafayette Park.

== See also ==
- History of the Jews in Metro Detroit
