= 2023 Detroit casino strike =

2023 labor dispute involving Detroit casino workers and two US gambling companies

On October 17, 2023, casino workers in Detroit began a strike against MGM Resorts International, operator of the MGM Grand Detroit, and Penn Entertainment, which runs the MotorCity Casino Hotel and Hollywood Casino at Greektown. Casino workers in Michigan's largest city, represented by the Detroit Casino Council (DCC), failed to reach a labor contract. The strike lasted 47 days for MGM and 34 for Penn Entertainment and ended after a contract was ratified between the DCC and both MGM and Penn.

== Background ==
The DCC is a group of labor organizations which is made up of five organizations: UNITE HERE Local 24, the United Auto Workers (UAW), Teamsters Local 1038, Operating Engineers Local 324, and the Michigan Regional Council of Carpenters, and represents 3,700 casino employees. The DCC demanded a higher wage which kept up with the pace of inflation, which since 2021 has experienced a global surge. Casino worker representatives also stated that due to the casino industry struggling during the COVID-19 pandemic, and the number of workers who have left the industry, existing workers took up a larger load of work for the smaller pay previously.

=== Offers ===
MGM argued that the deal that it had offered the DCC workers included the largest single pay increase in the history of the MGM Grand Detroit. The company previously offered five other proposals.

The UAW released a statement on their website outlining that the final proposals before the strike deadline failed to alleviate their concerns on healthcare, job security, wage increases, high workloads, and retirement value improvement.

== Strike action and responses ==
The strike officially began on October 17, 2023, after a deal could not be reached. MGM and Penn announced that their casinos would remain open. throughout the weekend of October 22-23. The casinos affected initially were the MGM Grand Detroit, Hollywood Casino at Greektown, and MotorCity Casino Hotel. According to the UAW, a near-unanimous 99% of members voted to strike if a deal wasn't reached.

The DCC estimated that operators would lose $3.4 million in revenue per day, with the single largest loss being from the MGM Grand Detroit at $1.7 million per day struck.

== Negotiated contracts and end of the strike ==
Penn Entertainment and MGM reached a tentative deal with the DCC on November 17; the deal with Penn covering 2,100 workers was ratified by members of the union, though the MGM deal was negatively received by its workers, though according to MGM, 600 workers voted in favor of the deal. MGM's largest offer prior to Penn Entertainment's ratification of the deal was rejected on November 20 which included an 18% immediate pay rise. On December 2, 2023, the DCC ratified a 64-month contract with MGM and Penn, ending the 47-day strike. The contract gives MGM workers their largest ever pay increase with no additions to healthcare bills as well as clauses targeting job protection, workload reductions, and retirement increases. MGM representatives released positive statements to news organizations in light of the ratification, stating to Reuters that the hotel would be able to "immediately resume full and normal operations". DCC member Unite Here stated that its workers would receive a $3/hour immediate raise and $5/hour in total raises by the end of the 64 months.
