= Samantha Woll =

American Jewish community leader (1983–2023)

- Woll in 2022
- Born: June 15, 1983; Detroit, Michigan, U.S.
- Died: October 21, 2023 (aged 40); Detroit, Michigan, U.S.
- Education: University of Michigan
- Occupation: President of Isaac Agree Downtown Synagogue

Samantha Woll (June 15, 1983 – October 21, 2023) was an American Jewish community leader, founder of the Muslim-Jewish Forum of Detroit, the president of Isaac Agree Downtown Synagogue in Detroit, Michigan. On October 21, 2023, she was found stabbed to death outside her home. Her killing, amid increased tensions during the Gaza war, drew international attention, but no motive was found for her slaying.

== Early life ==
Woll graduated from Hillel Day School (1997), Cranbrook Kingswood Upper School (2001) and attended the University of Michigan.

== Career ==
Woll was the founder of the Muslim-Jewish Forum of Detroit. In 2015, in the wake of the November 2015 Paris attacks, she helped bring high school students of Muslim and Jewish faith together through an essay and art contest in a public event at Wayne State University organized through Greater Detroit Muslim Jewish Solidarity Council. U.S. Rep. Rashida Tlaib called Woll a friend and an organizing community member.

From c. 2017, Woll served as Detroit's Jewish Community Relations Council/AJC board of directors member and was co-chair of the AJC's ACCESS Detroit Young Leadership Program.

In 2017 she was selected by the Detroit Jewish News as one of their "36 under 36".

From 2019 to 2021, she worked as deputy district director on the political campaign of Congresswoman Elissa Slotkin. She also worked on the re-election campaign of Attorney General Dana Nessel.

Woll became president of the Isaac Agree Downtown Synagogue in 2022.

== Death ==
On October 21, 2023, Woll was found stabbed to death outside her home in Detroit's Lafayette Park neighborhood. She was 40. Her killing, during the Gaza war, drew international attention, though police stated that no definitive motivations for her slaying were found.

In early November, Detroit Police arrested a suspect, whom The Detroit News reported was an acquaintance of Woll, then released that person without charges.

On December 10, a different "person of interest" was arrested for Woll's murder. The suspect, Michael Jackson-Bolanos, 28, of Detroit, was officially charged with murder, home invasion and lying to investigators on December 13. Woll's blood was found on his jacket. He entered a plea of not guilty. Jackson-Bolanos was convicted of lying to police, but was acquitted of first degree murder. The jury was deadlocked on charges of felony murder and home invasion. These deadlocked charges were later dismissed, but he was sentenced to 18 months to 15 years on the charge of lying to police.
