= 2021–22 Ferris State Bulldogs men's basketball team =

American college basketball season

2021–22 Ferris State Bulldogs men's basketball

NCAA DII Tournament, Midwest Regional Semifinal
- Conference: Great Lakes Intercollegiate Athletic Conference
- Record: 22–9 (16–4 GLIAC)
- Head coach: Andy Bronkema (9th season)
- Assistant coaches: Raymoan McAfee; Bill Killian; Dave Schlump; Josh Fleming
- Home arena: Jim Wink Arena

2021–22 Great Lakes Intercollegiate Athletic Conference men's basketball standings
	Conf.				Overall
Team	W		L	PCT	W		L	PCT
1Y. Ferris State	16	–	4	.800	22	–	9	.710
2Y. Michigan Tech	16	–	4	.800	21	–	7	.750
3Y. Northern Michigan	12	–	8	.600	18	–	12	.600
4Y. Saginaw Valley St.	12	–	8	.600	19	–	11	.633
5. Grand Valley St	11	–	9	.550	17	–	11	.607
6. Lake Superior St.	11	–	9	.550	16	–	11	.593
7. Parkside	10	–	9	.526	14	–	14	.500
8. Davenport †	10	–	10	.500	17	–	14	.548
Purdue Northwest	4	–	16	.200	7	–	21	.250
Wayne State	4	–	16	.200	5	–	18	.217
Northwood	3	–	16	.158	5	–	21	.192
† 2022 GLIAC tournament winner Rankings from Poll

The 2021–22 Ferris State Bulldogs men's basketball team represented Ferris State in the 2021–22 NCAA Division II men's basketball season. The Bulldogs were led by 9th-year head coach Andy Bronkema and played their home games at Jim Wink Arena in Big Rapids, Michigan as members of the GLIAC.

== Previous season ==
=== Regular season ===
The Bulldogs finished 8–8 in the GLIAC and 9–11 overall in the 2020–21 season prior to the GLIAC tournament

== Departures ==
Name	Number	Pos.	Height	Weight	Year	Hometown	Notes
Quantes Jackson	14	G	6'2"	170	Jr	Grand Rapids, MI	
Jeremiah Washington	11	G	5'10"	165	So	Eau Claire, WI	Transferred to Le Moyne
Dylan Dankenbring	21	F	6'9"	240	Jr	Peck, MI	
Ryan Segall	25	F	6'10"	225	Redshirt Fr	Indianapolis, IN	Transferred to Berry College
Michael Peterson	31	F	6'6"	200	Sr	Rockford, MI	Transferred to Michigan State
Mason Pline	32	F	6'8"	230	Jr	Fowler, MI	Committed to the Ferris State Football team

=== Incoming transfers ===
Incoming transfers
Name	Number	Pos.	Height	Weight	Year	Hometown	Previous School
Keymonta Johnson	2	G	6'3"	200	Graduate Student	Decatur, IL	Illinois–Springfield
Reese McDonald	4	G	6'2"	180	Sophomore	Raleigh, NC	Brunswick Community College
Lee Higgins	11	G	6'2"	180	Graduate Student	Chicago, IL	Concordia-St. Paul
Solomon Oraegbu	31	G	6'3"	180	Redshirt Sophomore	Chicago, IL	Wisconsin–Parkside

=== 2021 Recruiting Class ===
College recruiting information
Name	Hometown	School	Height	Weight	Commit date
Bennie Crenshaw; G	Waterford, MI	Waterford Kettering High School	5 ft 11 in (1.80 m)	170 lb (77 kg)	May 14, 2020
Bennie Crenshaw; G	Recruit ratings: Scout: Rivals: 247Sports: (N/A)				
Ethan Erickson; G	Grand Rapids, MI	Forest Hills Northern High School	6 ft 0 in (1.83 m)	165 lb (75 kg)	May 15, 2020
Ethan Erickson; G	Recruit ratings: Scout: Rivals: 247Sports: (N/A)				
Brandon Claerbaut; F	Zeeland, MI	Zeeland East High School	6 ft 5 in (1.96 m)	170 lb (77 kg)	Sep 5, 2020
Brandon Claerbaut; F	Recruit ratings: Scout: Rivals: 247Sports: (N/A)				
Nathan Claerbaut; F	Zeeland, MI	Zeeland East High School	7 ft 0 in (2.13 m)	210 lb (95 kg)	Sep 5, 2020
Nathan Claerbaut; F	Recruit ratings: Scout: Rivals: 247Sports: (N/A)				
Overall recruit ranking:
Note: In many cases, Scout, Rivals, 247Sports, On3, and ESPN may conflict in their listings of height and weight.; In these cases, the average was taken. ESPN grades are on a 100-point scale.; Sources:

== Roster ==
2021–22 Ferris State Bulldogs men's basketball team
Players
Coaches

Pos.	#	Name	Height	Weight	Year	Previous school	Hometown
G	0	Walt Kelser	6 ft 0 in (1.83 m)	175 lb (79 kg)	RS So	Schoolcraft CC	Southfield, MI
F	1	Deng Reng	6 ft 6 in (1.98 m)	185 lb (84 kg)	RS So	Wheaton North	Wheaton, IL
G	2	Keymonta Johnson	6 ft 3 in (1.91 m)	200 lb (91 kg)	GS	Illinois-Springfield	Decatur, IL
G	3	Ben Davidson	6 ft 3 in (1.91 m)	205 lb (93 kg)	RS So	Saint Clair High	St. Clair, MI
G	4	Reese McDonald	6 ft 2 in (1.88 m)	180 lb (82 kg)	So	Brunswick CC	Raleigh, NC
F	5	Logan Ryan	6 ft 8 in (2.03 m)	220 lb (100 kg)	Sr	Colorado State	Canton, MI
F	10	Dorian Aluyi	6 ft 5 in (1.96 m)	215 lb (98 kg)	Sr	Minot State	Chicago, IL
G	11	Lee Higgins	6 ft 3 in (1.91 m)	185 lb (84 kg)	GS	Concordia-St. Paul	Chicago, IL
G	15	Bennie Crenshaw	5 ft 11 in (1.8 m)	170 lb (77 kg)	Fr	Waterford Kettering	Waterford, MI
F	20	Reece Hazelton	6 ft 6 in (1.98 m)	220 lb (100 kg)	Fr	Glen Lake High School	Glen Arbor, MI
G	21	Ethan Erickson	6 ft 0 in (1.83 m)	165 lb (75 kg)	Fr	Forest Hills Northern	Grand Rapids, MI
F	23	Mykel Bingham	6 ft 7 in (2.01 m)	170 lb (77 kg)	Fr	Grand Rapids Catholic Central	Grand Rapids, MI
G	24	Jimmy Scholler	6 ft 3 in (1.91 m)	195 lb (88 kg)	Fr	Forest Hills Central	Grand Rapids, MI
F	25	Brandon Claerbaut	6 ft 5 in (1.96 m)	170 lb (77 kg)	Fr	Zeeland East	Zeeland, MI
F	31	Solomon Oraegbu	6 ft 3 in (1.91 m)	180 lb (82 kg)	RS So	Wisconsin–Parkside	Chicago, IL
F	32	Nathan Claerbaut	7 ft 0 in (2.13 m)	210 lb (95 kg)	Fr	Zeeland East	Zeeland, MI
F	34	Vejas Grazulis	6 ft 10 in (2.08 m)	250 lb (113 kg)	RS So	Muskegon CC	Marquette, MI
F	35	Aidan Shore (injured)	6 ft 9 in (2.06 m)	210 lb (95 kg)	RS Fr	Sterling High	Sterling, IL

Head coach

- Andy Bronkema (Cornerstone)

Assistant coach(es)

- Raymoan McAfee (Ferris State)
- Bill Killian (North Park)
- Dave Schlump (Ferris State)
- Josh Fleming (Ferris State)

Legend

- (C) Team captain
- (S) Suspended
- (I) Ineligible
- (W) Walk-on
- Injured
- Current redshirt

Roster
Last update: November 10, 2021

== Preseason ==
=== Preseason GLIAC Poll ===
In the Pre-season rankings for the GLIAC North, Ferris State was narrowly projected to finish second, just behind Michigan Tech.

== Schedule and results ==
Date time, TV	Rank^{#}	Opponent^{#}	Result	Record	High points	High rebounds	High assists	Site (attendance) city, state
Exhibition
October 27, 2021*; 7:00 pm, BTN+		at Michigan State	L 58–92		12 – Kelser	6 – Scholler	3 – Tied	Breslin Center (14,797); East Lansing, MI
November 5, 2021*; 7:00 pm		at Xavier	L 59–100		12 – Johnson	7 – Aluyi	2 – Johnson	Cintas Center (9,544); Cincinnati, OH
Regular Season
November 12, 2021*; 7:00 pm		Ohio Dominican	W 83–76	1–0	20 – Kelser	7 – Aluyi	8 – Scholler	Jim Wink Arena; Big Rapids, MI
November 14, 2021*; 3:00 pm		Drury	W 124–77	2–0	40 – Kelser	8 – Johnson	10 – Scholler	Jim Wink Arena (750); Big Rapids, MI
November 17, 2021*; 7:00 pm		at No. 3 Hillsdale	W 89–58	3–0	21 – Kelser	9 – Hazelton	5 – Scholler	Dawn Tibbetts Potter Arena (401); Hillsdale, MI
November 20, 2021*; 3:00 pm		Ashland	W 85–73 ^{OT}	4–0	26 – Kelser	9 – Ryan	7 – Scholler	Jim Wink Arena (1,437); Big Rapids, MI
November 23, 2021*; 7:00 pm	No. 9	at Findlay	L 74–86	4–1	18 – Kelser	10 – Aluyi	3 – Scholler	Croy Gymnasium (763); Findlay, OH
November 28, 2021*; 1:00 pm	No. 9	Lincoln	W 82–66	5–1	20 – Ryan	11 – Ryan	8 – Scholler	Jim Wink Arena; Big Rapids, MI
December 2, 2021; 7:30 pm	No. 7	Purdue Northwest	W 120–77	6–1 (1–0)	21 – Aluyi	12 – Ryan	9 – Kelser	Big Rapids High School (817); Big Rapids, MI
December 4, 2021; 3:00 pm	No. 7	Wisconsin–Parkside	W 91–68	7–1 (2–0)	19 – Kelser	9 – Tie	9 – Scholler	Big Rapids High School (450); Big Rapids, MI
December 9, 2021; 7:45 pm		at Northern Michigan	W 76–63	8–1 (3–0)	20 – Kelser	12 – Aluyi	2 – Tie	Berry Events Center (96); Marquette, MI
December 11, 2021; 2:00 pm		at Michigan Tech	W 71–48	9–1 (4–0)	15 – Grazulis	9 – Aluyi	4 – Scholler	SDC Gymnasium (948); Houghton, MI
December 20, 2021*; 5:00 pm		at Lewis	L 85–90	9–2	25 – Davidson	8 – Davidson	3 – Tie	Neil Carey Arena (311); Romeoville, IL
December 29, 2021*; 7:00 pm		Algoma	Canceled					Jim Wink Arena; Big Rapids, MI
January 1, 2022*; 3:00 pm		Alma	Canceled					Jim Wink Arena; Big Rapids, MI
January 2, 2022*; 1:00 pm		Minnesota–Duluth	L 107–109 ^{2OT}	9–3	37 – Kelser	9 – Ryan	8 – Scholler	Jim Wink Arena (1,181); Big Rapids, MI
January 8, 2022; 3:00 pm		Saginaw Valley State	W 88–84	10–3 (5–0)	24 – Higgins	13 – Aluyi	6 – Scholler	Jim Wink Arena (1,376); Big Rapids, MI
January 10, 2022; 5:30 pm		Wayne State	W 104–73	11–3 (6–0)	15 – Tie	7 – Tie	6 – Erickson	Jim Wink Arena (917); Big Rapids, MI
January 13, 2022; 8:00 pm		at Grand Valley State	W 83–76	12–3 (7–0)	23 – Aluyi	9 – Kelser	4 – Aluyi	Fieldhouse Arena (1,605); Allendale, MI
January 20, 2022; 7:30 pm		Lake Superior State	W 95–80	13–3 (8–0)	15 – Kelser	13 – Ryan	7 – Erickson	Jim Wink Arena (1,376); Big Rapids, MI
January 24, 2022; 8:00 pm		at Northwood	W 101–78	14–3 (9–0)	–	–	–	Riepma Arena; Midland, MI
January 27, 2022; 8:00 pm		at Saginaw Valley State	W 82–71	15–3 (10–0)	23 – Higgins	11 – Aluyi	5 – Scholler	James E. O'Neill Jr. Arena (612); University Center, MI
January 29, 2022; 3:00 pm		at Wayne State	W 75–60	16–3 (11–0)	18 – Ryan	8 – Scholler	3 – Davidson	Wayne State Fieldhouse (710); Detroit, MI
February 3, 2022; 7:30 pm		Davenport	W 91–74	17–3 (12–0)	16 – Tie	8 – Aluyi	6 – Kelser	Jim Wink Arena (1,376); Big Rapids, MI
February 5, 2022; 3:00 pm		Grand Valley State	W 83–80	18–3 (13–0)	15 – Tie	9 – Aluyi	5 – Scholler	Jim Wink Arena (2,212); Big Rapids, MI
February 7, 2022; 3:00 pm		at Davenport	L 73–75	18–4 (13–1)	18 – Higgins	13 – Ryan	7 – Aluyi	DU Student Center (245); Grand Rapids, MI
February 10, 2022; 7:30 pm		at Lake Superior State	L 73–88	18–5 (13–2)	16 – Higgins	8 – Aluyi	4 – Kelser	Ronald Cooper Gymnasium; Sault Ste Marie, MI
February 14, 2022; 7:30 pm		Northwood	W 92–71	19–5 (14–2)	21 – Davidson	12 – Aluyi	9 – Scholler	Jim Wink Arena (1,057); Big Rapids, MI
February 17, 2022; 8:30 pm		at Wisconsin-Parkside	W 77–60	20–5 (15–2)	24 – Kelser	6 – Tie	4 – Scholler	De Simone Gymnasium (535); Kenosha, WI
February 19, 2022; 3:00 pm		at Purdue Northwest	L 77–80 ^{OT}	20–6 (15–3)	20 – Grazulis	13 – Ryan	4 – Scholler	PNW Fitness Center (150); Hammond, IN
February 24, 2022; 7:30 pm		Michigan Tech	W 76–72 ^{OT}	21–6 (16–3)	32 – Kelser	10 – Aluyi	3 – Kelser	Jim Wink Arena (1,377); Big Rapids, MI
February 26, 2022; 3:00 pm		Northern Michigan	L 87–93	21–7 (16–4)	19 – Kelser	8 – Ryan	5 – Tie	Jim Wink Arena (1,471); Big Rapids, MI
GLIAC tournament
March 2, 2022; 7:30 pm	(1)	(8) Davenport; GLIAC Quarterfinals	L 90–91	21–8	35 – Kelser	6 – Hazelton	7 – Scholler	Jim Wink Arena (1,271); Big Rapids, MI
NCAA Division II Midwest Regional
March 11, 2022*; 2:30 pm	(2)	vs. (7) Findlay; Quarterfinal	W 87–81	22–8	22 – Tie	8 – Ryan	3 – Tie	Alumni Arena (153); North Canton, OH
March 12, 2022*; 5:00 pm	(2)	vs. (3) Hillsdale; Semifinal	L 74–90	22–9	19 – Kelser	11 – Aluyi	6 – Scholler	Alumni Arena (143); North Canton, OH
*Non-conference game. ^{#}Rankings from d2sida. (#) Tournament seedings in parentheses. All times are in Eastern Time.
