= 2022 in Michigan =

- Decades: 2000s; 2010s; 2020s
- See also: History of Michigan; Historical outline of Michigan; List of years in Michigan; 2022 in the United States

Events from the year 2022 in Michigan.

== Office holders ==
=== State office holders ===
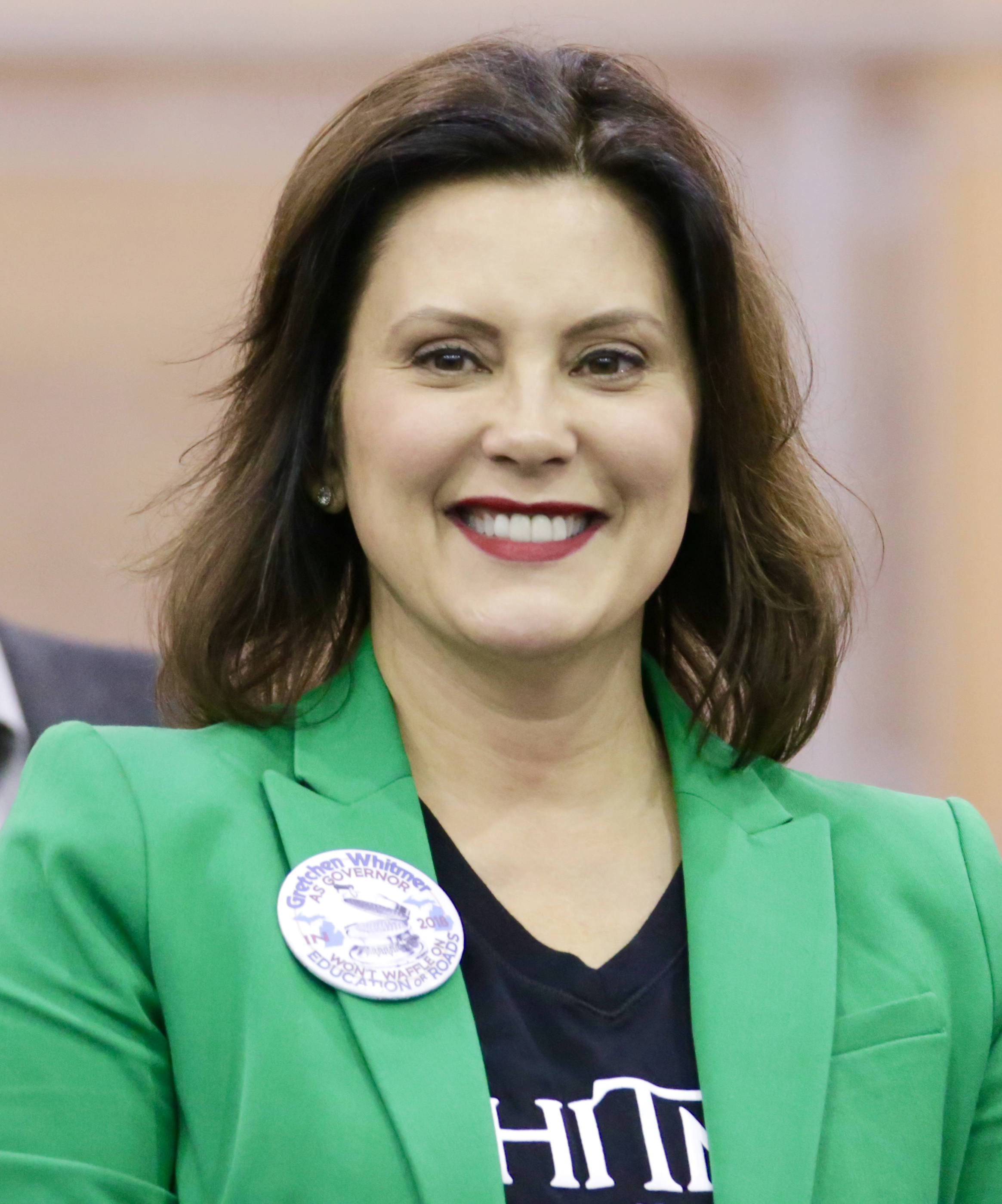
Gretchen Whitmer

- Governor of Michigan: Gretchen Whitmer (Democratic)
- Lieutenant Governor of Michigan: Garlin Gilchrist (Democratic)
- Michigan Attorney General: Dana Nessel (Democratic)
- Michigan Secretary of State: Jocelyn Benson (Democratic)
- Speaker of the Michigan House of Representatives: Jason Wentworth (Republican)
- Majority Leader of the Michigan Senate: Mike Shirkey (Republican)
- Chief Justice, Michigan Supreme Court: Bridget Mary McCormack

=== Mayors of major cities ===
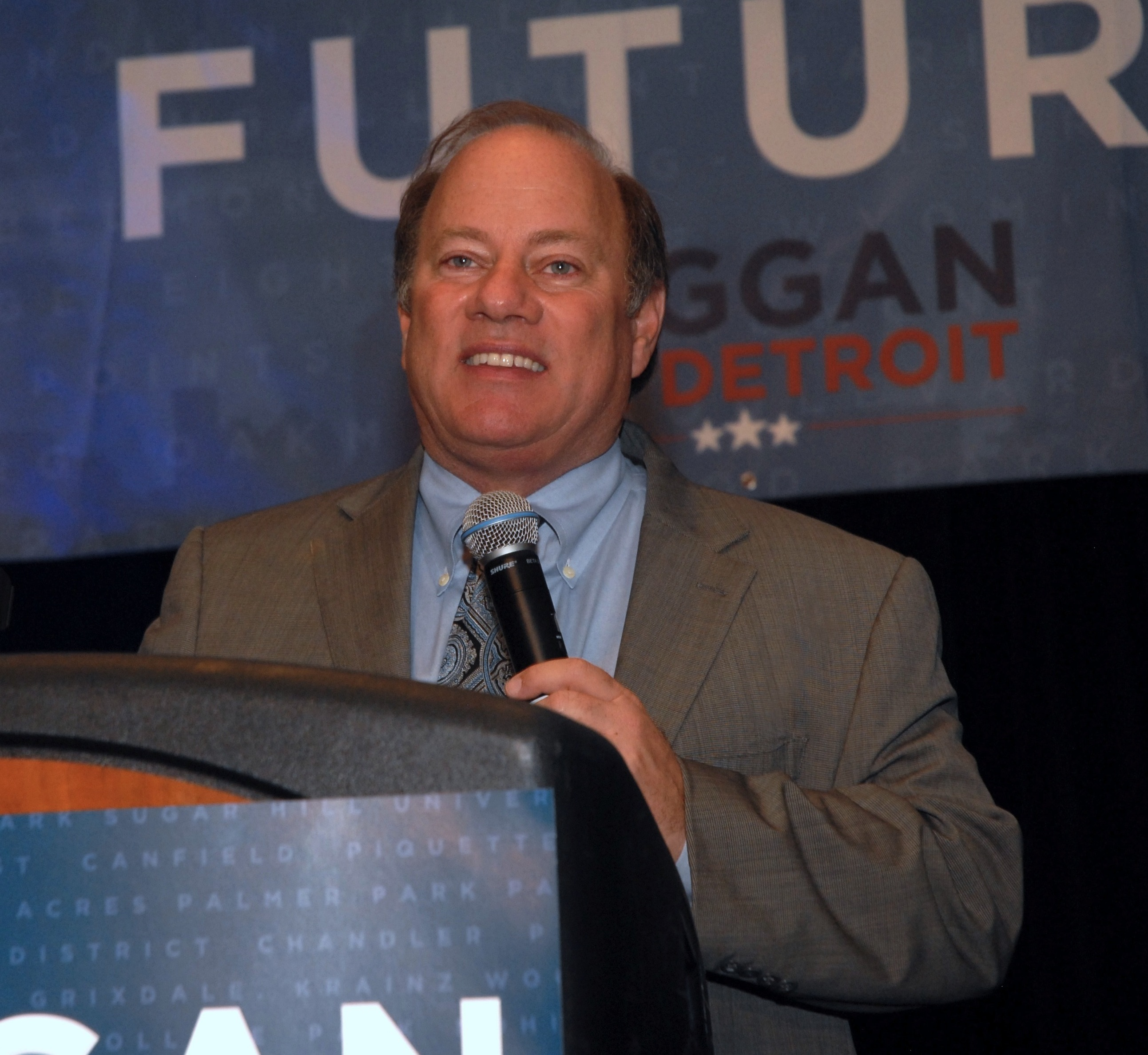
Mike Duggan

- Mayor of Detroit: Mike Duggan (Democrat)
- Mayor of Warren, Michigan: James R. Fouts
- Mayor of Grand Rapids: Rosalynn Bliss
- Mayor of Sterling Heights, Michigan: Michael C. Taylor
- Mayor of Ann Arbor: Christopher Taylor (Democrat)
- Mayor of Dearborn: Abdullah Hammoud
- Mayor of Lansing: Andy Schor (Democrat)
- Mayor of Flint: Sheldon Neeley
- Mayor of Saginaw: Brenda Moore

=== Federal office holders ===
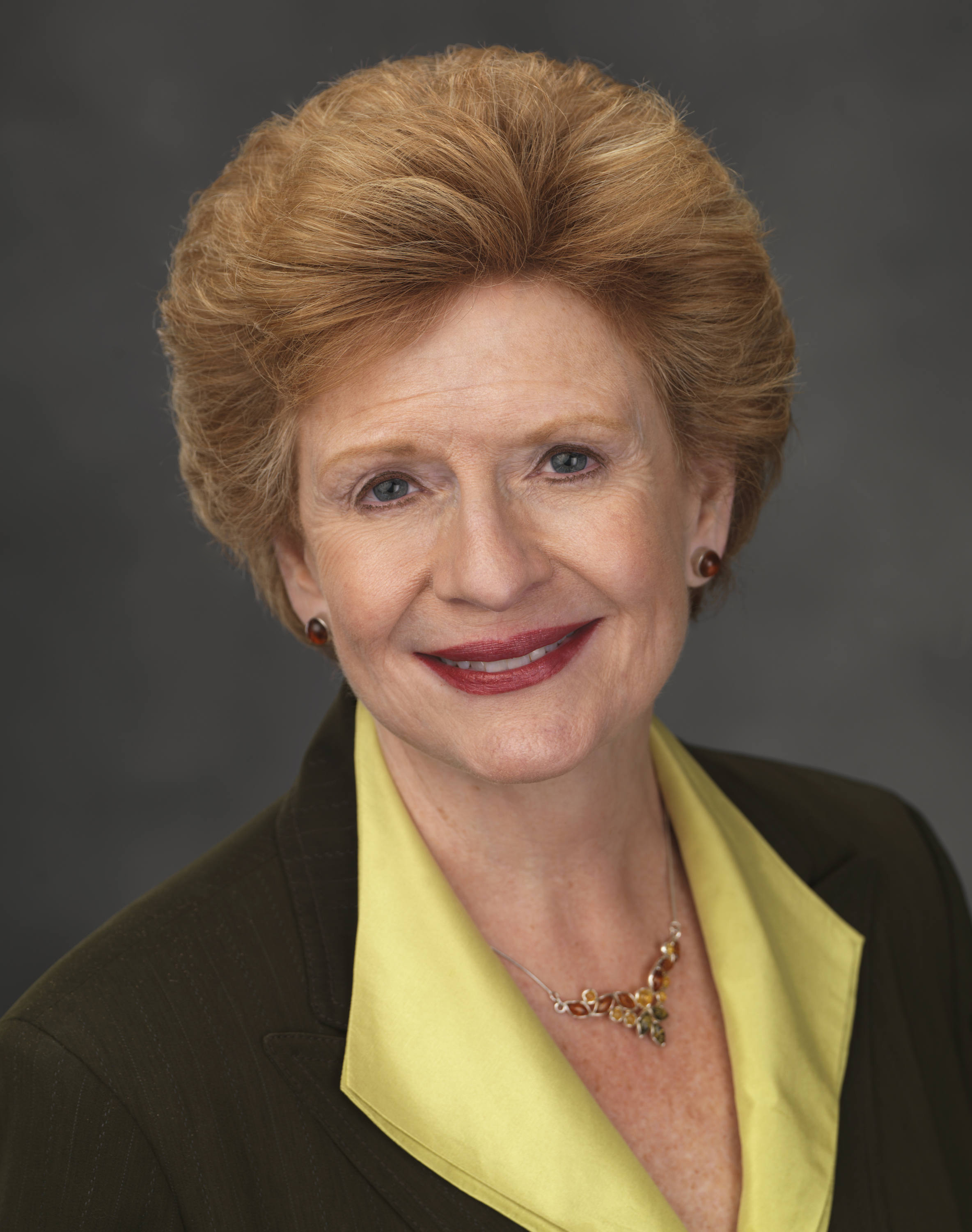
Debbie Stabenow

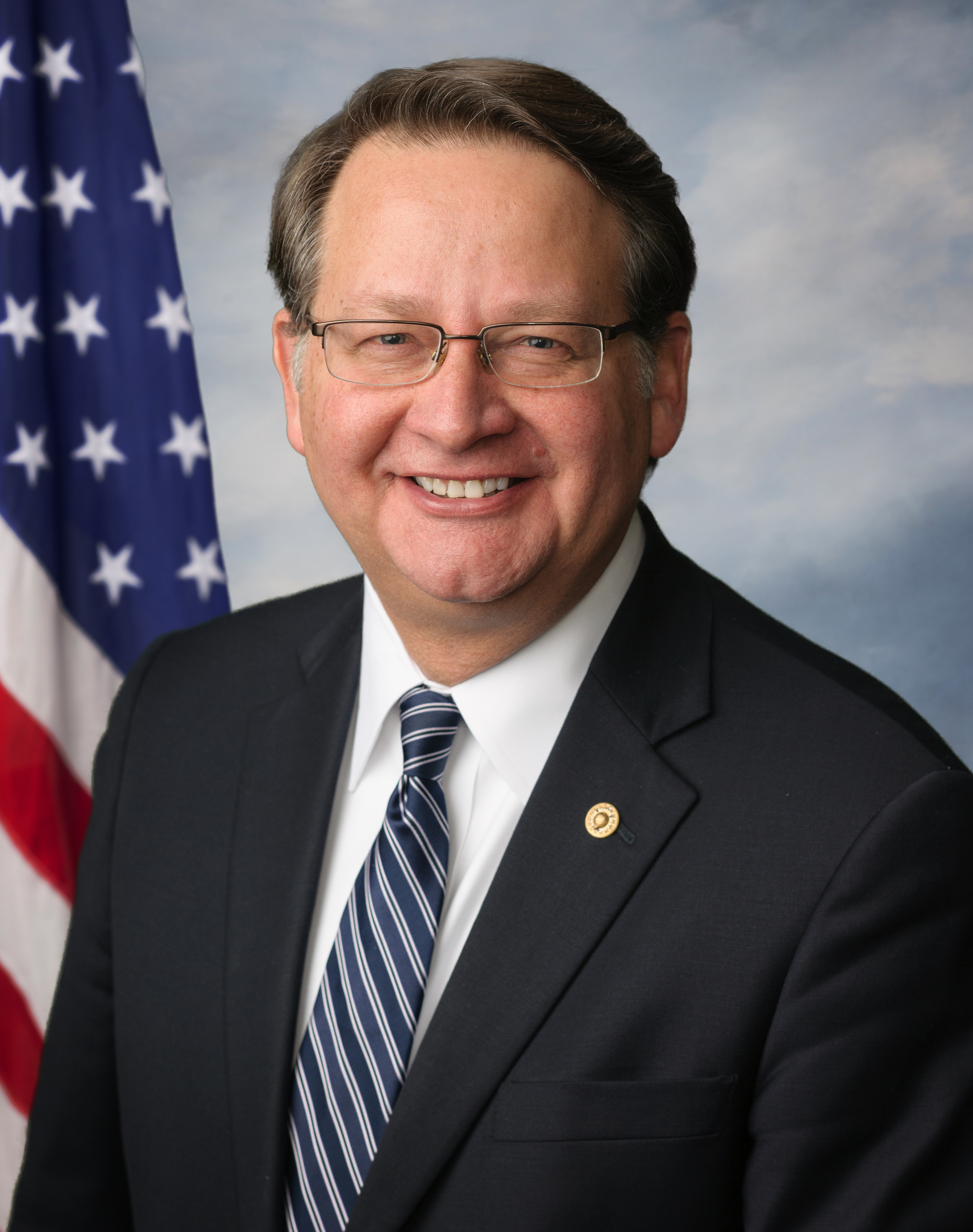
Gary Peters

- U.S. Senator from Michigan: Debbie Stabenow (Democrat)
- U.S. Senator from Michigan: Gary Peters (Democrat)
- House District 1: Jack Bergman (Republican)
- House District 2: Bill Huizenga (Republican)
- House District 3: Peter Meijer (Republican)
- House District 4: John Moolenaar (Republican)
- House District 5: Dan Kildee (Democrat)
- House District 6: Fred Upton (Republican)
- House District 7: Tim Walberg (Republican)
- House District 8: Elissa Slotkin (Democrat)
- House District 9: Andy Levin (Democrat)
- House District 10: Lisa McClain (Republican)
- House District 11: Haley Stevens (Democrat)
- House District 12: Debbie Dingell (Democrat)
- House District 13: Rashida Tlaib (Democrat)
- House District 14: Brenda Lawrence (Democrat)

== Population of largest cities ==
The state's 15 largest cities, based on U.S. Census estimates for 2021, were as follows:

| 2021 rank | City | County | 2000 pop. | 2010 pop. | 2020 pop. | 2021 pop. (est) | Change 2000-21 |
|---|---|---|---|---|---|---|---|
| 1 | Detroit | Wayne | 951,270 | 713,777 | 639,111 | 632,464 | −33.5% ▼ |
| 2 | Grand Rapids | Kent | 197,800 | 188,036 | 198,917 | 198,173 | 0.2% ▲ |
| 3 | Sterling Heights | Macomb | 124,471 | 129,699 | 134,346 | 133,269 | 7.1% ▲ |
| 4 | Warren | Macomb | 138,247 | 134,056 | 139,387 | 138,130 | 0.1% ▼ |
| 5 | Ann Arbor | Washtenaw | 114,024 | 113,934 | 123,851 | 121,536 | 6.6% ▲ |
| 6 | Lansing | Ingham | 119,128 | 114,297 | 112,644 | 112,684 | 5.4% ▼ |
| 7 | Dearborn | Wayne | 97,775 | 98,153 | 109,976 | 108,420 | 8.9% ▲ |
| 8 | Livonia | Wayne | 100,545 | 96,942 | 95,534 | 94,422 | 6.1% ▼ |
| 9 | Troy | Oakland | 80,959 | 80,980 | 87,294 | 86,836 | 7.3% ▲ |
| 10 | Westland | Wayne | 86,602 | 84,094 | 85,420 | 84,515 | |
| 11 | Farmington Hills | Oakland | 82,111 | 79,740 | 83,986 | 83,292 | |
| 12 | Flint | Genesee | 124,943 | 102,434 | 81,252 | 80,628 | 35.5% ▼ |
| 13 | Wyoming | Kent | 69,368 | 72,125 | 76,501 | 76,749 | |
| 14 | Southfield | Oakland | 78,322 | 71,758 | 76,618 | 75,898 | |
| 15 | Kalamazoo | Kalamazoo | 76,145 | 74,262 | 73,598 | 73,257 | |

== Sports ==
=== Baseball ===
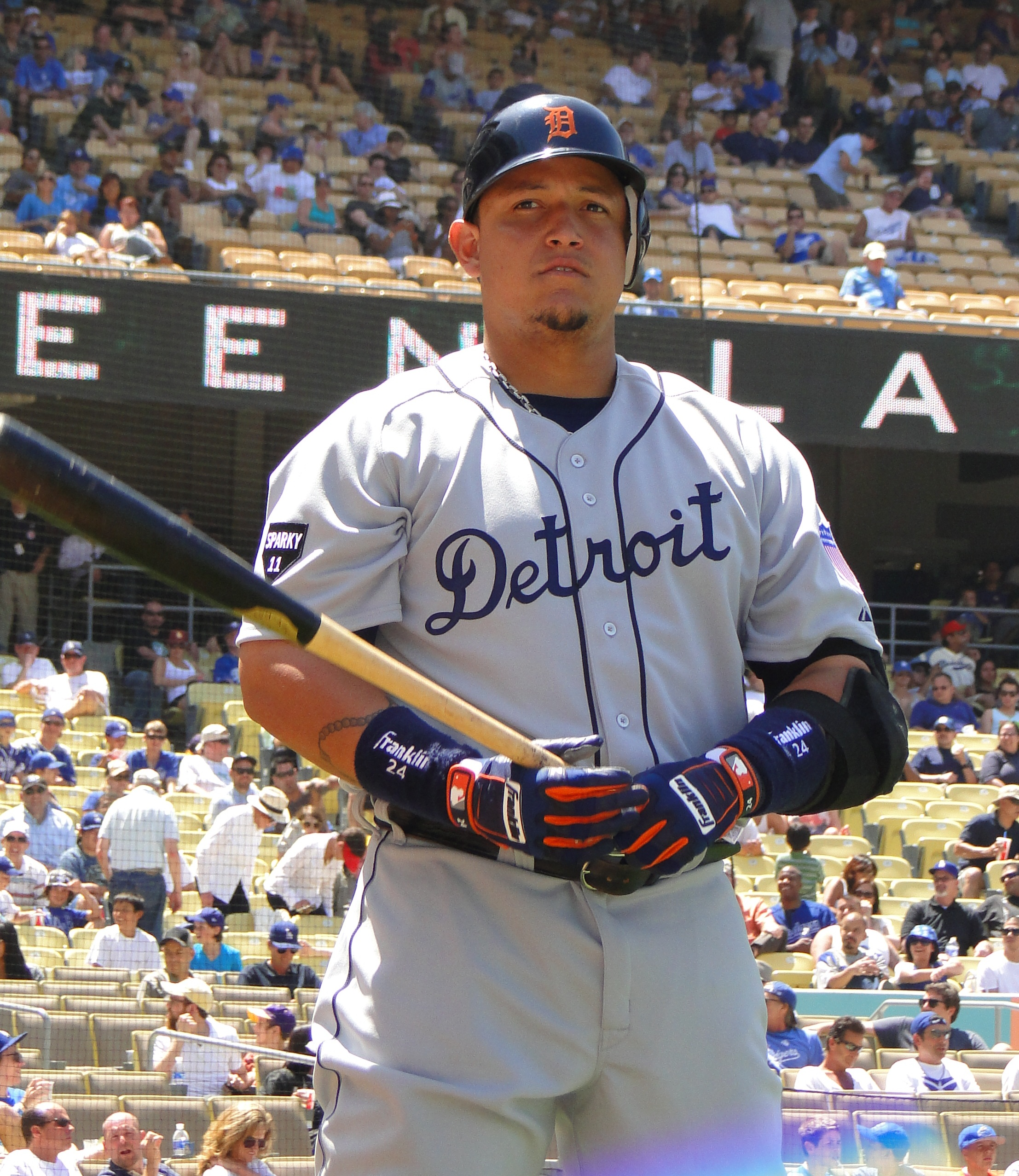
Miguel Cabrera became the newest member of the 3,000-hit club on April 23, 2022.

- 2022 Detroit Tigers season – Under manager A. J. Hinch, the team compiled a 66–96 record. The team's statistical leaders included Harold Castro with a .271 batting average and Javier Baez with 17 home runs and 67 RBIs. Alex Lange led the pitching staff with a 7-4 record and Andrew Chafin with a 2.83 earned run average. Player Miguel Cabrera recorded his 3,000th hit at the major league level.
- 2022 Michigan Wolverines baseball team - In their tenth and final season under head coach Erik Bakich, the team compiled a 34–28 record and won the Big Ten Baseball Tournament.
- 2022 Michigan Wolverines softball team - In their 38th and final season under head coach Carol Hutchins, the team compiles a 38–18 record.
- 2022 Central Michigan Chippewas baseball team - Under head coach Jordan Bischel, the team compiled a 43–19 and won the MAC tournament.

=== American football ===
- 2022 Detroit Lions season - In their second season under head coach Dan Campbell, the Lions began the season 1-6, but finiished strong to compile a 9–8 record, the team's first winning season since 2017.
- 2022 Michigan Panthers season - Led by head coach Jeff Fisher, the Panthers compiled a 2–8 record in the United States Football League (2022).
- 2022 Michigan Wolverines football team - The Wolverines compiled a 13–1 record, going undefeated in the regular season, defeating Purdue in the Big Ten Championship Game, and losing to TCU in the College Football Playoff Semifinal.
- 2022 Michigan State Spartans football team - The Spartans compiled a 5–7 record.
- 2022 Ferris State Bulldogs football team - The Bulldogs compiled a 14–1 record and won the NCAA Division II championship.
- 2022 Eastern Michigan Eagles football team - The Eagles compiled a 9–4 record and defeated San Jose State in the Famous Idaho Potato Bowl.
- 2022 Central Michigan Chippewas football team - The Chippewas compiled a 4–8 record.
- 2022 Western Michigan Broncos football team - The Broncos compiled a 5–7 record.

=== Basketball ===
- 2021–22 Detroit Pistons season – Under head coach Dwane Casey, the Pistons compiled a 23–59 record. The team's leaders included Saddiq Bey with 1,321 points, Cade Cunningham with 356 assists, and Isaiah Stewart with 617 rebounds.
- 2021–22 Michigan Wolverines men's basketball team – Under head coach Juwan Howard, the Wolverines compiled a 19–15 record and advanced to the Sweet Sixteen at the NCAA tournament.
- 2021–22 Michigan State Spartans men's basketball team – Under head coach Tom Izzo, the Spartans compiled a 23–13 record.
- 2021–22 Michigan Wolverines women's basketball team – Under head coach Kim Barnes Arico, the Wolverines compiled a 25–7 record.
- 2021–22 Michigan State Spartans women's basketball team - Under head coach Tom Izzo, the team compiled a 23–13 record and advanced to the second round of the NCAA tournament
- 2021–22 Central Michigan Chippewas men's basketball team
- 2021–22 Detroit Mercy Titans men's basketball team
- 2021–22 Eastern Michigan Eagles men's basketball team
- 2021–22 Ferris State Bulldogs men's basketball team
- 2021–22 Michigan Tech Huskies men's basketball team
- 2021–22 Oakland Golden Grizzlies men's basketball team
- 2021–22 Western Michigan Broncos men's basketball team

=== Ice hockey ===
- 2021–22 Detroit Red Wings season – Under head coach Jeff Blashill, the Wings compiled a 32–40–10 record. The team's leaders included Dylan Larkin with 31 goals and 69 points scored and Moritz Seider with 43 assists.
- 2021–22 Michigan Wolverines men's ice hockey season – Under head coach Mel Pearson, the Wolverines compiled a 31–10–1 record.
- 2021–22 Michigan State Spartans men's ice hockey season
- 2021–22 Ferris State Bulldogs men's ice hockey season
- 2021–22 Lake Superior State Lakers men's ice hockey season
- 2021–22 Michigan Tech Huskies men's ice hockey season
- 2021–22 Northern Michigan Wildcats men's ice hockey season
- 2021–22 Western Michigan Broncos men's ice hockey season

=== Other ===
- 2022 Detroit City FC season
- 2022 Chevrolet Detroit Grand Prix (IMSA)
- 2022 Chevrolet Detroit Grand Prix

== Chronology of events ==
=== January ===
- January - The Omicron variant of the coronavirus surged through Michigan.
- January 1 - The 2021 Michigan Wolverines football team lost to eventual national champion Georgia in the College Football Playoff
- January 4 - Final U.S. domestic automobile sales data for 2021 showed that Toyota topped General Motors for the first time.
- January 11 - The Ford Maverick won the truck of the year award. The Ford Bronco won the SUV of the year award, and the Honda Civic won car of the year award.
- January 11 - Nicklas Lidstrom was named vice president of hockey operations for the Detroit Red Wings
- January 14 - The State of Michigan announced an unprecedented $20 billion surplus resulting from $5.8 billion in anticipated surplus state revenues and $15 billion in unspent federal stimulus and infrastructure funds.
- January 15 - University of Michigan president Mark Schlissel was fired for cause following an investigation of his relationship with a subordinate.
- January 19 - University of Michigan announced a $490 million settlement with students who asserted they were sexually assaulted by former football team doctor, Robert Anderson
- January 25 - General Motors announced a new $7 billion investment in four Michigan manufacturing facilities, including $4 billion to convert the Orion Assembly factory for construction of electric pickup trucks and $2.6 billion for a new battery factory in Lansing.
- January 26 - Gov. Gretchen Whitmer's State of the State address asserted the state had made great progress in 2021 despite the coronavirus.

=== February ===
- February - Truckers protesting against vaccine mandates on the Canadian side closed the Ambassador Bridge, exacerbating supply-chain issues for the automobile industry.
- February 1 - Merger launched between Beaumont Health and Spectrum Health
- February 1 - General Motors announced distribution of $10,250 profit-sharing checks for workers.
- February 3 - Ford announced $7,377 average profit-sharing payments to UAW workers
- February 6 - University of Michigan's offensive coordinator Josh Gattis was hired by Miami.
- February 13 - Former Detroit Lions quarterback Matthew Stafford led the Los Angeles Rams to victory in Super Bowl LVI.
- February 16 - Former Macomb County Prosecutor Eric Smith was sentenced to 21 months in federal prison in avscheme to divert campaign funds, which scheme was alleged to have been ongoing from 2012 to 2019.
- February 16 - Jim Harbaugh signed a contract extension to remain Michigan's football coach through 2026.
- February 17 - The historic white wooden clubhouse building at Oakland Hills Country Club in Bloomfield Hills was destroyed by fire.
- February 20 - Michigan men's basketball coach Juwan Howard took a swing at a Wisconsin assistant coach after a game in Madison, Wisconsin. He was suspended for the balance of the regular season.
- February 27 - Over 1,000 attended a rally in Detroit's Hart Plaza in support of peace for Ukraine following the Russian invasion.

=== March ===
- March 1 - Oakland County Judge Kwame Rowe ruled that Ethan Crumbley should stay in custody through his trial in the Oxford school shooting.
- March 2 - Ford announced division of the company into three automotive business units, including the new Ford Blue (traditional internal combustion vehicles) and Ford Modele (electric vehicles).
- March - Four militia members charged with conspiring to kidnap Gov. Gretchen Whitmer were tried.

=== April ===
- April 4 - Killing of Patrick Lyoya
- April 8 - On opening day in Detroit, Javier Baez drove in the winning run in the ninth inning to lead the Detroit Tigers to a 5-4 victory.

=== May ===
- May 3 - A special election is held in four districts of the Michigan House of Representatives.

=== July ===
- July 29 - Former President Donald Trump endorsed Tudor Dixon ahead of the Republican gubernatorial primary.

=== August ===
- August 23 - A federal jury in Grand Rapids found Adam Fox and Barry Croft Jr. guilty of kidnapping conspiracy and conspiracy to possess weapons of mass destruction in the Gretchen Whitmer kidnapping plot.

=== November ===
- November 8 - A number of general elections were held, including:
  - 2022 Michigan gubernatorial election: Incumbent Democratic Governor Gretchen Whitmer defeated Republican nominee Tudor Dixon. Whitmer received 2,427,985 votes (54.5%) to 1,958,311 (43.9%) for Dixon.
  - Proposal 3, known as the "Right to Reproductive Freedom Initiative", passed with 2,477,707 votes (56.66%). The proposal added a right of access to abortion to the Constitution of Michigan.
  - 2022 Michigan Attorney General election - Democratic incumbent Dana Nessel defeated Republican Matthew DePerno. Nessel received 2,320,440 votes (53.2%) to 1,945,531 (44.6%) for DePerno.
  - 2022 Michigan Secretary of State election - Democratic incumbent Jocelyn Benson defeated Republican Kristina Karamo. Benson received 2,465,218 votes (55.9%) to 1,850,362 (41.9%) for Karamo.
  - 2022 Michigan Senate election: Democrats won control of the Michigan Senate for the first time since the 1980s, with 20 Democrats and 18 Republicans in the chamber.
  - 2022 Michigan House of Representatives election: Democrats won control of the Michigan House of Representatives for the first time since 2010.
- November 22 - Kyra Harris Bolden was appointed by Governor Whitmer to the Michigan Supreme Court following Justice Bridget Mary McCormack's resignation, becoming the first Black woman to serve on the court.

=== December ===
- December 31 - Michigan lost to TCU in the Fiesta Bowl.

== Deaths ==
- January 19 - Dan Dworsky, UM football player and architect, in Los Angeles
- January 21 - Rex Cawley, Highland Park native and gold medalist in 400 meter hurdles at the 1964 Olympics in Orange, California
- January 21 - Arthur Tarnow, US District Judge in Detroit 1998-2022, in Detroit
- January 30 - Cheslie Kryst, Miss USA 2010 and Jackson, Michigan native, in New York City
- February 4 - Avern Cohn, US District Judge in Detroit 1979-2022, in Royal Oak, Michigan
- February 12 - Frank Beckmann, talk radio host and UM football radio announcer, at Clarkston, Michigan
- February 15 - Woodrow Stanley, mayor of Flint 1991-2002, in Flint
- February 22 - The Amazing Jonathan, Detroit native, and comic magician, in Las Vegas
- March 15 - Eugene Parker, solar and plasma physicist and Houghton native, in Chicago
- April 4 - Joe Messina, Motown guitarist, at Northville, Michigan
- May 8 - Robert J. Vlasic, businessman who grew Vlasic Pickles into America's No. 1 pickle company, in Bloomfield Hills, Michigan
- May 10 - Bob Lanier, Detroit Pistons center 1970-1979, in Phoenix, Arizona
- May 30 - William Lucas, Wayne County Sheriff 1969-1983, in Detroit
- June 22 - Alexander Jefferson, one of the last surviving Tuskegee Airmen, in Detroit
- July 2 - Jim Van Pelt UM quarterback who later starred in Canadian Football League, in Winnetka, Illinois
- July 6 - Norah Vincent, Detroit native, newspaper columnist and author, in Switzerland
- July 11 - Gary Moeller, Michigan head coach 1990-1994, at Lima, Ohio
- August 1 - Robert E. Simanek, received Medal of Honor for actions in Korean War, in Novi, Michigan
- August 8 - Lamont Dozier, Motown singer, songwriter and producer with 14 No 1 hits (Heat Wave, Where Did Our Love Go, Two Hearts), at Scottsdale, Arizona
- August 17 - Jack H. McDonald
- August 19 - John Wockenfuss, played for Detroit Tigers 1974-1983 at Wilmington, Delaware
- August 25 - Mable John, first woman singer signed by Motown, in Los Angeles
- September 3 - Specs Howard, radio disc jockey and founder of broadcasting school
- October 6 - Ivy Jo Hunter
- October 13 - James McDivitt, Apollo astronaut grew up in Kalamazoo and graduated from University of Michigan
- December 10 - J. J. Barnes, R&B singer/songwriter
- December 30 - Gretchen Carhatt Valade, businesswoman, arts patron, at age 97
