= Fowler High School =

Fowler High School may refer to:

- George Fowler High School (New York)
- Fowler High School (Colorado)
- Fowler High School (Michigan)
- Fowler High School (California)
