= Slicker Parks =

American baseball player (1895–1978)

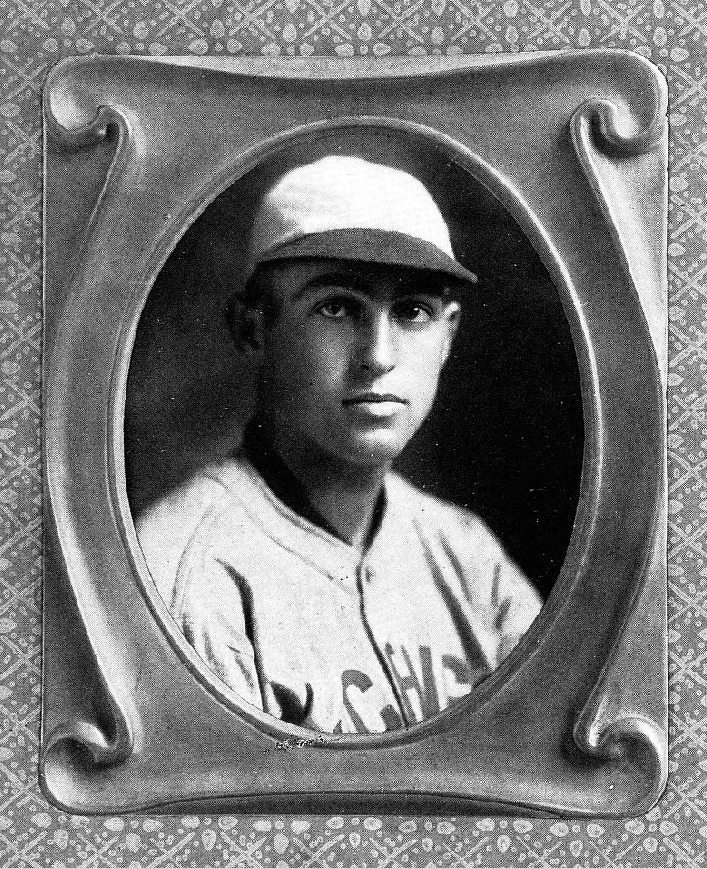
- Vernon H. "Slicker" Parks, captain of Michigan's 1920 baseball team
- Pitcher
- Born: November 10, 1895; Dallas, Michigan, U.S.
- Died: February 21, 1978 (aged 82); Royal Oak, Michigan, U.S.
- Batted: Right Threw: Right

MLB debut
- July 11, 1921, for the Detroit Tigers

Last MLB appearance
- September 4, 1921, for the Detroit Tigers

MLB statistics
- Win–loss record: 3-2
- Earned run average: 5.68
- Strikeouts: 10
- Stats at Baseball Reference

Teams
- Detroit Tigers (1921)

Vernon Henry "Slicker" Parks (November 10, 1895 – February 21, 1978) was an American baseball player. He played Major League Baseball for the Detroit Tigers in 1921 and also played college baseball for the Michigan Wolverines baseball team (1919–1920) and minor league baseball for the Portland Beavers (1920), Seattle Indians (1922), Syracuse Stars (1922–1925), Jersey City Skeeters (1926–1927), and seven other teams from 1926 to 1932.

== Early life ==
Parks was born in Fowler, Clinton County, Michigan, in November 1895. At the time of the 1900 Census, Parks was living with his grandparents, Jacob and Anne Drake, his parents Henry Albert and Eloise Parks in Dallas Township, Michigan. Both his father and grandfather were identified as farmers in the Census record. In 1910, he was living with his parents and brothers, Glen and Leon, in Greenbush Township, Clinton County, Michigan. His father was identified as a farmer working his own farm.

== University of Michigan ==
Parks attended the University of Michigan, where he played college baseball for the Wolverines' Big Ten Conference championship teams of 1919 and 1920. He was recognized as the best pitcher in the Big Ten both years. He was also elected as the captain of the 1920 team and then re-elected as the captain of the 1921 Michigan team. However, he was declared ineligible soon after spring practice in 1921 for having played professional baseball. A Chicago newspaper published a photograph of Parks playing for the Portland Beavers of the Pacific Coast League under the name Harold Brooks. After the exposure, Parks resigned from the team and from the captaincy. A student publication defended Parks and advocated a revised definition of the "professional" player, noting that Parks was in need of financial support and "should be allowed to play summer ball so that he may be able to finish his college course." During his time at the University of Michigan, Parks became a member of the Lambda Chi Alpha fraternity.

== Professional career ==
After leaving the Michigan team, Parks signed to play with Bill Niesen's Pyotts in April 1921 and with the Detroit Tigers starting July 1, 1921.

Parks played one season, 1921, in Major League Baseball as a pitcher for the Detroit Tigers. Playing for Ty Cobb's Tigers in 1921, Slicker Parks appeared in 10 games, one as a starter. He won 3 games and lost 2, giving up 16 earned runs in 25-1/3 innings for an earned run average of 5.68. He had one hit (a single) and one walk in nine at bats for a batting average of .111 and an on-base percentage of .200. He was not charged with any errors and finished his brief career with a perfect 1.000 fielding percentage.

Parks married Violet Bradt of Kingsville, Ontario, Canada, in December 1921 at Windsor, Ontario, Canada.

Although he never returned to the Major Leagues after 1921, Parks continued playing professional baseball through the 1932 season. He played in the minor leagues for the Seattle Indians (1922), Syracuse Stars (1922–1925), Jersey City Skeeters (1926–1927), and seven other teams from 1926 to 1932. In 1926, he won 19 games and lost 14 for Jersey City with a 2.62 earned run average.

Parks died in Royal Oak, Michigan.
