= Clem Sohn =

American airshow daredevil (1910–1937)

Clements Joseph Sohn
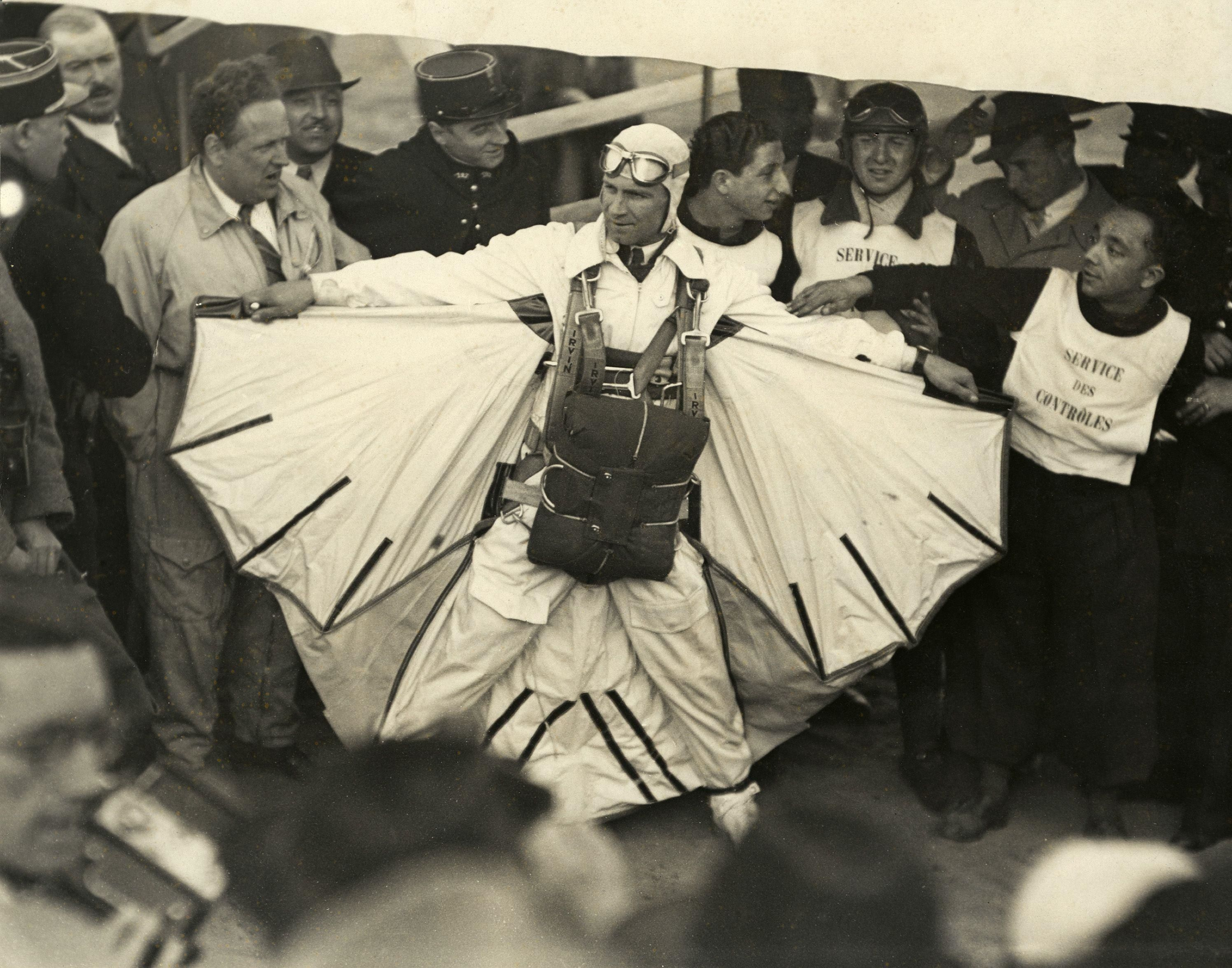
- Sohn (center) prior to his final jump
- Born: December 7, 1910; Fowler, Michigan, U.S.
- Died: April 25, 1937 (aged 26); Vincennes, Val-de-Marne, France
- Occupation: skydiver

Clements Joseph Sohn (December 7, 1910 – April 25, 1937) was an American airshow daredevil in the 1930s from Fowler, Michigan, United States. He perfected a way of gliding through the air with a home-made wingsuit. He had himself dropped from an airplane at a height of approximately 6,000 metres (20,000 ft) and would glide down until he was only 300 metres (980 ft) to 250 metres (820 ft) from the ground, at which point he would open his parachute for the final descent.

He made the wings from zephyr cloth mounted on steel tubes, forming a large web under each arm which was clasped to his hips. A feature of the wings was a device to prevent them from opening out too far and ripping his arms from their sockets. A loose cloth formed another web between his legs, which acted like a bird's tail. His large goggles gave him an appearance which led to his becoming known as "The Batman" or "The Batwing Jumper".

Clem was badly injured during the opening ceremony of Gatwick Aerodrome, in London, England, when his primary parachute tangled in his wings. He broke and mangled his shoulder on landing, after opening his emergency parachute at an altitude of only 60 metres (200 ft) and crashing into a taxi.

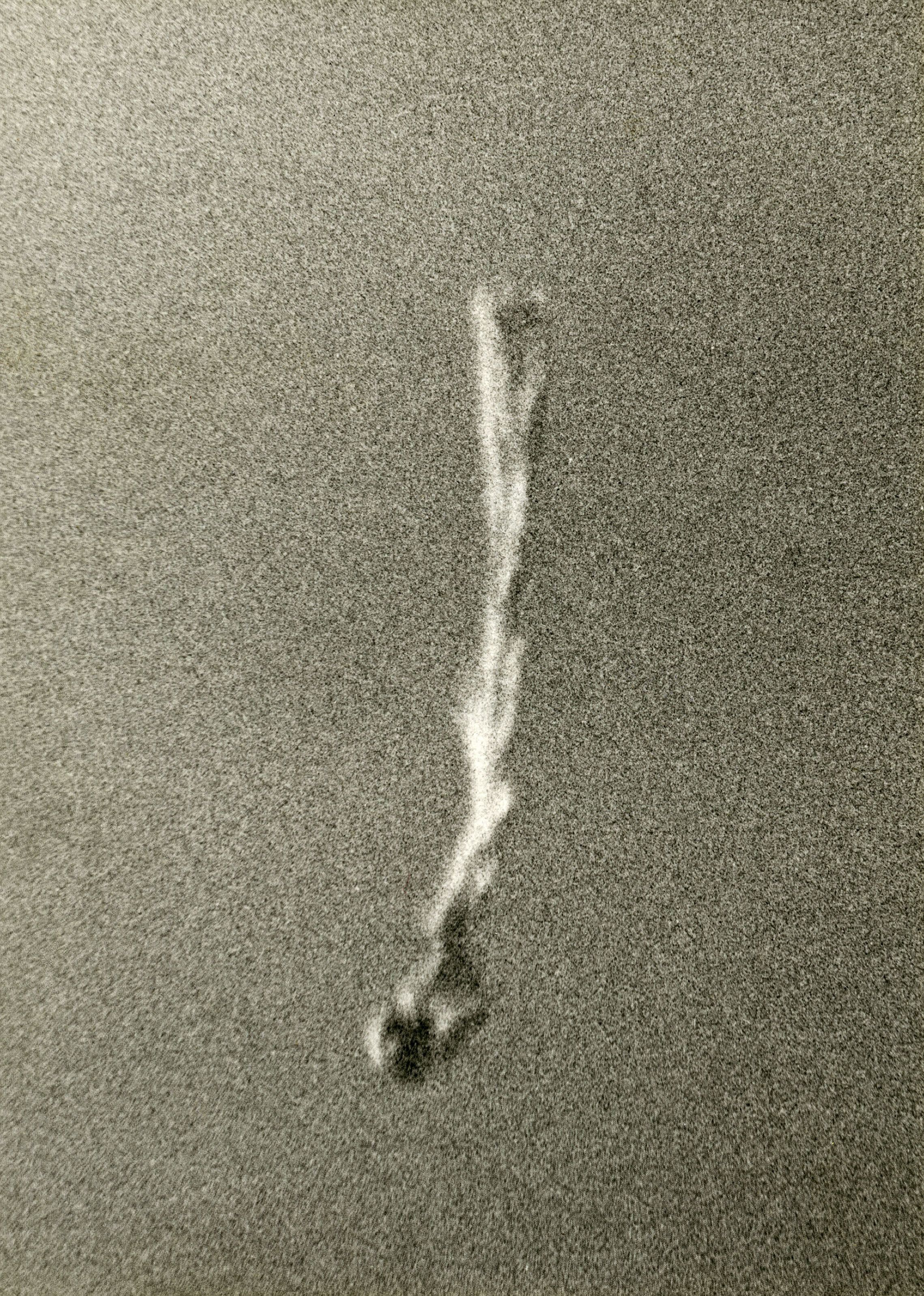
Sohn falls to his death.

Sohn's career came to an end on April 25, 1937, in Vincennes, France. Before taking off, Clem had remarked, "I feel as safe as you would in your grandmother's kitchen". During his descent on that day, his parachute did not open. A crowd of 100,000 watched him frantically tug on the ripcord of his emergency chute, but that failed too, and Sohn, 26 years old, plunged to his death.

== Marketing ==
There was at least one attempt to exploit Sohn's fame with a product tie-in. A UK manufacturer made the 'Welcom' Clem Sohn Bird-Man Glider, featuring "a red suited male figure with fold-out arms" and rubber wheels. It is now a collectible.
