= 2022 GLIAC Conference men's basketball tournament =

Men's Basketball Tournament

2022 GLIAC men's basketball tournament
- Classification: Division II
- Teams: 8
- Site: SDC Gymnasium; Houghton, MI
- Champions: Davenport (1 title)
- Winning coach: Burt Paddock (1 title)
- MVP: Jarrin Randall (Davenport)
- Attendance: 332
- Top scorer: Jarrin Randall (Davenport)

The 2022 Great Lakes Intercollegiate Athletic Conference men's basketball tournament is a postseason men's basketball tournament for the GLIAC of the 2021–22 NCAA Division II men's basketball season which is taking place between March 2–6, 2022. Following the conclusion of the Quarterfinals, the GLIAC announced that the Semifinals and Championship game would be hosted by Michigan Tech in Houghton, Michigan.

Davenport defeated Northern Michigan 100–67 in the championship game to win their first GLIAC tournament title in school history. As a result of the win, they received the conference's automatic bid to the NCAA DII tournament.

== Seeds ==
The top eight teams in the GLIAC, based on conference win percentage, will participate in the 2022 GLIAC Tournament.

Seed	School	Conference	Tiebreak 1
1	Ferris State	16–4	2–0 vs Michigan Tech
2	Michigan Tech	16–4	0–2 vs Ferris State
3	Northern Michigan	12–8	2–0 vs Saginaw Valley St
4	Saginaw Valley State	12–8	0–2 vs Northern Michigan
5	Grand Valley State	11–9	
6	Lake Superior State	11–9	
7	Parkside	10–9	
8	Davenport	10–10	
DNQ	Purdue NW	4–16	
DNQ	Wayne St. (MI)	4–16	
DNQ	Northwood	3–16	

== Schedule ==
Session	Game	Time*	Matchup^{#}	Score
Quarterfinals – Wednesday, March 2
1	1	7:00 PM	No. 4 Saginaw Valley State vs. No. 5 Grand Valley State	70–58
1	2	7:00 PM	No. 3 Northern Michigan vs. No. 6 Lake Superior State	99–94/OT
2	3	7:30 PM	No. 1 Ferris State vs. No. 8 Davenport	90–91
2	4	7:30 PM	No. 2 Michigan Tech vs. Parkside	66–53
Semifinals – Saturday, March 5
3	5	12:00 pm	No. 2 Michigan Tech vs. No. 3 Northern Michigan	71–78
3	6	2:00 pm	No. 4 Saginaw Valley State vs. No. 8 Davenport	80–98
Championship – Sunday, March 6
4	7	2:30 pm	No. 3 Northern Michigan vs. No. 8 Davenport	67–100

*Game times in Eastern Time. #Rankings denote tournament seeding.

== Bracket ==
Quarterfinals; March 3, 2021
8	Davenport	91
1	Ferris State	90
5	Grand Valley State	58
4	Saginaw Valley State	70
6	Lake Superior State	94
3	Northern Michigan	99
7	Parkside	53
2	Michigan Tech	66

Semifinals; March 5, 2021
8	Davenport	98
4	Saginaw Valley State	80
3	Northern Michigan	78
2	Michigan Tech	71

Championship; March 6, 2021
8	Davenport	100
3	Northern Michigan	67

== Game summaries ==
=== Quarterfinals ===
March 2
7:00 PM

Recap

No. 5 Grand Valley State 58, No. 4 Saginaw Valley State 70
Scoring by half: 30−29, 28−41
Pts: Jake Van Tubbergen, 16; Rebs: 2 Tied, 9 Asts: 2 Tied, 2	Pts: Darnell Hoskins Jr, 22; Rebs: Delano Smith, 6 Asts: 2 Tied, 3

James E. O'Neill Jr. Arena
University Center, MI
Attendance: 578
Referees: Todd Frazier, Chad Palmer, Cory DeGroote

March 2
7:00 PM

Recap

No. 6 Lake Superior State 94, No. 3 Northern Michigan 99 (OT)
Scoring by half: 32−43, 54−43 Overtime: 8−13
Pts: Malek Adams, 42; Rebs: CJ Robinson, 10; Asts: Malek Adams, 4	Pts: Nick Wagner, 22; Rebs: John Kerr, 14; Asts: Brian Parzych, 6

Berry Events Center
Marquette, MI
Attendance: 236
Referees: Nick Meyer, James Vanderveer, Aaron Wieber

March 2
7:30 PM

Recap

No. 7 Parkside 53, No. 2 Michigan Tech 66
Scoring by half: 32−30, 21−36
Pts: Jamir Simpson, 17; Rebs: Ramar Evans, 8 Asts: 2 Tied, 2	Pts: Owen White, 22; Rebs: Rebounds, 11; Asts: Owen White, 5

SDC Stadium
Houghton, MI
Attendance: 719
Referees: David Gawrisch, Troy Boardman, Darren Budagan

March 2
7:30 PM

Recap

No. 8 Davenport 91, No. 1 Ferris State 90
Scoring by half: 43−39, 48−51
Pts: Chris Rollins, 23; Rebs: Jairus Stevens, 6 Asts: Chris Rollins, 9	Pts: Walt Kelser, 35; Rebs: Reece Walton, 6 Asts: Jimmy Scholler, 7

Jim Wink Arena
Big Rapids, MI
Attendance: 1,271
Referees: Jeff Spedoske, Nicholas Terry, Kyle Bowen

=== Semifinals ===
March 5
12:00 PM

Recap

No. 3 Northern Michigan 78, No. 2 Michigan Tech 71
Scoring by half: 36−32, 42−39
Pts: Max Bjorklund, 35; Rebs: John Kerr, 8 Asts: Max Bjorklund, 3	Pts: Owen White, 30; Rebs: Trent Bell, 11; Asts: Carter Johnston, 4

SDC Gymnasium
Houghton, MI
Attendance: 820
Referees: Chad Palmer, Victor Harrington, Cory Degroote

March 5
2:00 PM

Recap

No. 8 Davenport 98, No 4. Saginaw Valley State 80
Scoring by half: 41−50, 57−30
Pts: Luke Maranka, 28; Rebs: Luke Maranka, 10; Asts: Chris Rollins, 8	Pts: Darnell Haskins Jr.,28; Rebs: Tyler Witz, 11; Asts: Delano Smith, 6

Houghton, Michigan
Houghton, MI
Attendance: 820
Referees: Jimmy Jarrett, Scott Sivelle, Bret Wegenke

=== Championship ===
March 6
2:30 PM

Recap

No. 8 Davenport 100, No 3. Northern Michigan 67
Scoring by half: 44-32, 56-34
Pts: Jarrin Randall, 28; Rebs: Luke Maranka, 8 Asts: 2 Tied, 2	Pts: Justin Kuehl, 13; Rebs: Nick Wagner, 6 Asts: 2 Tied, 3

SDC Gymnasium
Houghton, MI
Attendance: 332
Referees: Jimmy Jarrett, Scott Siville, Bret Wegenke
