= Fowler High School (Michigan) =

Location
- 700 South Main Street; Fowler, Michigan 48835; United States; 42°59′46″N 84°44′29″W

Information
- Type: Public high school
- School district: Fowler Public Schools
- Principal: Patrick O’Rourke
- Teaching staff: 9.56 (on an FTE basis)
- Grades: 9-12
- Enrollment: 177 (2023-2024)
- Student to teacher ratio: 18.51
- Colors: Blue and white
- Athletics conference: Central Michigan Athletic Conference
- Nickname: Eagles
- Website: fowlerschools.net/high-school

Fowler High School is a high school serving grades 9–12 in Fowler, Michigan, United States. The school is part of the Fowler Public Schools district.

== History ==
Fowler's first public schools opened in 1870. In 1873, a two-story wooden school was built at Wayne and Maple streets. In 1915, it was replaced with a brick building. When this new high school opened in 1959, the brick building became an elementary school until Waldron opened in 1969.

In 1998, voters approved funding for new school construction. As part of the project, the Village of Fowler sold the land where Spicer Field once stood to Fowler High School for one dollar.

Fowler High School is known for its strong academics and student growth. Its mission is to help students reach their full potential and become responsible citizens. The school has also excelled in sports, winning state championships in basketball, cross country, football, and track and field. Leadership continues to evolve, and as of July 1, 2023, Patrick O’Rourke is the Superintendent and Principal.

== Demographics ==
The demographic breakdown of the 177 students enrolled for 2024-25 was:

- Male - 54.8%
- Female - 45.1%
- Asian - 0%
- Black - 0.11%
- Hispanic - 0.16%
- White - 97.1%

16.9% of the students were eligible for free or reduced-cost lunch. For 2024–25, Fowler was a Title I school.

== Athletics ==
The Fowler Eagles compete in the Central Michigan Athletic Conference. The school colors are blue and white. The following Michigan High School Athletic Association (MHSAA) sanctioned sports are offered:

- Baseball (boys)
- Basketball (boys and girls)
  - Boys state champion - 1952
  - Girls state champion - 1991, 2021, 2022, 2025
- Bowling (boys and girls)
- Cross country (boys and girls)
  - Boys state champion - 1988, 1989, 1990
  - Girls state champion - 1988, 1989
- Football (boys)
  - State champion - 1993, 1995, 1996, 1998
- Golf (boys)
- Softball (girls)
- Track and field (boys and girls)
  - Boys state champion - 1985, 1988
  - Girls state champion - 1982, 1983, 1989, 1990, 1998, 2011, 2012, 2016, 2018, 2019
- Volleyball (girls)
  - 2025
- Wrestling (boys)

== Season-by-season record ==
=== Football ===
Season	Regular season			Postseason results	Head coach	Refs
Season	W	L	T	Postseason results	Head coach	Refs
1950	2	0	0	MHSAA Playoffs Not Established		
1951	3	0	0	MHSAA Playoffs Not Established		
1952	2	3	0	MHSAA Playoffs Not Established		
1953	3	2	0	MHSAA Playoffs Not Established		
1954	5	1	0	MHSAA Playoffs Not Established		
1955	5	2	1	MHSAA Playoffs Not Established		
1956	5	2	1	MHSAA Playoffs Not Established		
1957	8	1	0	MHSAA Playoffs Not Established		
1958	7	0	1	MHSAA Playoffs Not Established		
1959	7	1	0	MHSAA Playoffs Not Established		
1960	6	2	0	MHSAA Playoffs Not Established		
1961	6	2	0	MHSAA Playoffs Not Established		
1962	8	0	0	MHSAA Playoffs Not Established		
1963	7	1	0	MHSAA Playoffs Not Established		
1964	4	5	0	MHSAA Playoffs Not Established		
1965	7	2	0	MHSAA Playoffs Not Established		
1966	8	0	0	MHSAA Playoffs Not Established		
1967	3	5	0	MHSAA Playoffs Not Established		
1968	2	6	0	MHSAA Playoffs Not Established		
1969	1	7	0	MHSAA Playoffs Not Established		
1970	5	3	0	MHSAA Playoffs Not Established		
1971	3	5	0	MHSAA Playoffs Not Established	Steve Spicer	
1972	8	1	0	MHSAA Playoffs Not Established	Steve Spicer	
1973	7	2	0	MHSAA Playoffs Not Established	Steve Spicer	
1974	9	0	0	MHSAA Playoffs Not Established	Steve Spicer	
1975	9	0	0	Failed to qualify for playoffs	Steve Spicer	
1976	3	6	0	Failed to qualify for playoffs	Steve Spicer	
1977	8	1	0	Failed to qualify for playoffs	Steve Spicer	
1978	6	3	0	Failed to qualify for playoffs	Steve Spicer	
1979	9	1	0	Lost Regionals Game (Gobles)	Steve Spicer	
1980	10	2	0	Lost Finals Game (Norway)	Steve Spicer	
1981	6	3	0	Failed to qualify for playoffs	Steve Spicer	
1982	8	1	0	Failed to qualify for playoffs	Steve Spicer	
1983	9	1	0	Lost Regionals Game (Our Lady of the Lakes Catholic)	Steve Spicer	
1984	7	1	1	Failed to qualify for playoffs	Steve Spicer	
1985	10	1	0	Lost Regionals Game (Battle Creek)	Steve Spicer	
1986	11	1	0	Lost Finals Game (Michigan Lutheran Seminary)	Steve Spicer	
1987	9	2	0	Lost Regionals Game (Sand Creek)	Steve Spicer	
1988	6	4	0	Lost Pre-Regionals Game (Sand Creek)	Steve Spicer	
1989	6	3	0	Failed to qualify for playoffs	Steve Spicer	
1990	8	3	0	Lost Regionals Game (Frankfort)	Steve Spicer	
1991	6	4	0	Lost Regionals Game (Battle Creek)	Steve Spicer	
1992	9	2	0	Lost Regionals Game (St. Patrick Catholic)	Steve Spicer	
1993	13	0	0	Won Division 8 State Championship (Frankfort)	Steve Spicer	
1994	8	2	0	Lost Pre-Regionals Game (St. Patrick Catholic)	Steve Spicer	
1995	13	0	0	Won Division 8 State Championship (Baraga)	Steve Spicer	
1996	12	0	0	Won Division 8 State Championship (Lake Linden–Hubbell)	Neal Hoffman	
1997	9	2	0	Lost Regionals Game (St. Patrick Catholic)	Neal Hoffman	
1998	10	3	0	Won Division 8 State Championship (Felch North Dickinson)	Neal Hoffman	
1999	8	4	0	Lost Regionals Game (Mendon)	Neal Hoffman	
2000	11	1	0	Lost Regionals Game (Frankfort)	Neal Hoffman	
2001	10	2	0	Lost Regionals Game (Beal City)	Neal Hoffman	
2002	12	1	0	Lost Semi-Finals Game (St. Mary Cathedral)	Neal Hoffman	
2003	7	3	0	Lost Pre-Districts Game (Middleton)	Neal Hoffman	
2004	5	5	0	Lost Pre-Districts Game (Martin)	Neal Hoffman	
2005	4	5	0	Failed to qualify for playoffs	Neal Hoffman	
2006	8	3	0	Lost Districts Game (New Lothrop)	Neal Hoffman	
2007	5	5	0	Lost Pre-Districts Game (Middleton)	Neal Hoffman	
2008	4	5	0	Failed to qualify for playoffs	Paul Hungerford	
2009	5	5	0	Failed to qualify for playoffs	Paul Hungerford	
2010	9	1	0	Lost Pre-Districts Game (Middleton)	Craig Koenigsknecht	
2011	11	3	0	Lost Finals Game (Mendon)	Craig Koenigsknecht	
2012	9	2	0	Lost Districts Game (Muskegon Catholic Central)	Craig Koenigsknecht	
2013	8	3	0	Lost Districts Game (Muskegon Catholic Central)	Kris Ernst	
2014	10	1	0	Lost Districts Game (Muskegon Catholic Central)	Kris Ernst	
2015	7	4	0	Lost Districts Game (Michigan Lutheran Seminary)	Kris Ernst	
2016	6	4	0	Lost Pre-District Game (Shrine Catholic)	Kris Ernst	
2017	4	5	0	Failed to qualify for playoffs	Kris Ernst	
2018	4	5	0	Failed to qualify for playoffs	Kris Ernst	
2019	11	2	0	Lost Semi-Final Game (Reading)	John Spicer	
2020	6	3	0	Lost Districts Final Game (Carson City)	John Spicer	
2021	7	4	0	Lost Regionals Game (Breckenridge)	John Spicer	
2022	10	2	0	Lost Regionals Final Game (Ubly)	John Spicer	
2023	8	2	0	Lost Pre-District Game (Ithaca)	John Spicer	
2024	12	1	0	Lost Semi-Final Game (Beal City)	John Spicer	
2025	6	4	0	Lost Pre-District Game (New Lothrop)	John Spicer	
2026	7	4	0	Lost Pre-District Game (Hudson)	Jeremy Stephens	
Totals	550	188	4	All-time MHSAA regular & postseason record (1950–2025)		

=== Boys basketball ===
Season	Regular season			Postseason results	Head coach	Refs
Season	W	L	T	Postseason results	Head coach	Refs
1950-51*	0	0	0	Lost Finals Game (Brimley)	Marion Piggott	
1951-52*	6	1	0	Lost Semi-Finals Game (Brimley)	Marion Piggott	
1952-53*	8	0	0	State Champions	Marion Piggott	
1953-54*	5	1	0	Lost Regionals Final Game (Beal City)	Marion Piggott	
1954-55*	2	1	0	Lost Regional Final Game (Remus)	Marion Piggott	
1955-56*	0	1	0	Lost District Game (Ionia Sts. Peter & Paul)	Marion Piggott	
1956-57*	1	1	0	Lost District Final Game (Ashley)	Marion Piggott	
1957-58*	0	1	0	Lost District Game (Pewamo)	Marion Piggott	
1958-59	15	3	0	Lost Quarterfinals Game (Schoolcraft)	Marion Piggott	
1959-60	16	2	0	Lost Semi-Finals Game (Baldwin)	Marion Piggott	
1960-61	13	4	0	Lost Quarterfinals Game (Flint Hoover)	Marion Piggott	
1961-62	15	3	0	Lost Semi-Finals Game (Free Soil)		
1962-63	12	4	0	Lost Regional Finals Game (Potterville)		
1963-64	9	2	0	Lost Quarterfinals Game (Owosso St. Paul)		
1964-65	7	5	0	Lost Regional Finals Game (Barryton)		
1965-66	9	2	0	Lost Districts Game (Webberville)		
1966-67	13	3	0	Lost Districts Final Game (Portland St. Patrick)		
1967-68	16	1	0	Lost Regionals Game (Flint St. Matthew)		
1968-69	11	6	0	Lost Regionals Game (Muskegon Western Michigan Christian)		
1969-70	14	2	0	Lost Districts Final Game (Portland St. Patrick)		
1970-71	13	2	0	Lost Districts Game (Portland St. Patrick)		
1971-72	13	4	0	Lost Regional Finals Game (Saginaw St. Joseph)		
1972-73	21	1	0	Lost Regional Finals Game (Weberville)		
1973-74	15	5	0	Lost Districts Game (Portland St. Patrick)		
1974-75	17	2	0	Lost Districts Game (Potterville)		
1975-76	18	4	0	Lost Regionals Game (Mt. Pleasant Sacred Heart)		
1976-77	14	8	0	Lost Quarterfinals Game (Detroit DePorres)		
1977-78	14	5	0	Lost Regionals Game (Laingsburg)		
1978-79	10	7	0	Lost District Finals Game (Saranac)		
1979-80	6	9	0	Lost Districts Game (Mt. Pleasant Sacred Heart)		
1980-81	14	4	0	Lost Regionals Game (Mt. Pleasant Sacred Heart)		
1981-82	11	6	0	Lost Regionals Game (Allendale)		
1982-83	12	3	0	Lost Regional Finals Game (Concord)		
1983-84	8	6	0	Lost Regional Finals Game (Concord)		
1984-85	8	3	0	Lost Districts Game (Lansing Christian)		
1985-86	14	2	0	Lost Quarterfinals Game (Allen Park Inter-City Baptist)		
1986-87	11	2	0	Lost Regionals Game (Flint Holy Rosary)		
1987-88	15	5	0	Lost Quarterfinals Game (Detroit East Catholic)		
1988-89	10	7	0	Lost District Finals Game (Beal City)		
1989-90	14	2	0	Lost Districts Game (Beal City)		
1990-91	11	5	0	Lost District Finals Game (Ashley)		
1991-92	11	4	0	Lost Districts Game (Mt. Pleasant Sacred Heart)		
1992-93	17	3	0	Lost Semi-Finals Game (Muskegon Western Michigan Christian)		
1993-94	16	3	0	Lost Regional Finals Game (Waterford Our Lady of the Lakes)		
1994-95	17	4	0	Lost Semi-Finals Game (Walker Covenant Christian)		
1995-96	18	2	0	Lost Quarterfinals Game (Detroit Holy Redeemer)		
1996-97	15	5	0	Lost Quarterfinals Game (Detroit Holy Redeemer)		
1997-98	17	3	0	Lost Quarterfinals Game (Detroit East Catholic)	Scott Pischea	
1998-99	13	2	0	Lost Districts Game (Wyoming Tr-unity Christian)	Scott Pischea	
1999-20	12	5	0	Lost Regionals Game (Covert)	Scott Pischea	
2000-01	11	4	0	Lost Districts Game (Wyoming Tr-unity Christian)	Scott Pischea	
2001-02	18	2	0	Lost Quarterfinals Game (Detroit Rogers)	Scott Pischea	
2002-03	17	4	0	Lost Finals Game (Wyoming Tr-unity Christian)	Scott Pischea	
2003-04	15	4	0	Lost Quarterfinals Game (Detroit Rogers)	Scott Pischea	
2004-05*	5	1	0	Lost Quarterfinals Game (Detroit Rogers)	Scott Pischea	
2005-06	10	14	0	Lost Quarterfinals Game (Detroit Rogers)	Scott Pischea	
2006-07	7	17	0	Lost Regional Finals Game (Burton Genessee Christian)	Scott Pischea	
2007-08	12	12	0	Lost Regional Finals Game (Kingston)	Scott Pischea	
2008-09	13	10	0	Lost Districts Finals Game (New Lothrop)		
2009-10	16	7	0	Lost Districts Finals Game (New Lothrop)		
2010-11	2	18	0	Lost Districts Game (Fulton)		
2011-12	8	13	0	Lost Districts Game (Fulton)		
2012-13	13	11	0	Lost Regionals Game (Muskegon Catholic Central)		
2013-14	11	8	1	Lost Districts Game (Fulton)		
2014-15	12	9	0	Lost Districts Game (Fulton)		
2015-16	13	8	0	Lost Districts Final Game (Fulton)	Jason George	
2016-17	18	8	0	Lost Quarter Finals Game (Southfield Christian)	Jason George	
2017-18	17	6	0	Lost Districts Game (Fulton)	Jason George	
2018-19	12	10	1	Lost Districts Final Game (Webberville)	Jason George	
2019-20	6	15	0	Lost Districts Game (Morrice)	Kameron Riley	
2020-21	4	8	0	Lost Districts Game (St. Patrick)	Kameron Riley	
2021-22	13	8	0	Lost Districts Game (Fulton)	Kameron Riley	
2022-23	13	10	0	Lost Districts Final Game (Lansing Christian)	Kameron Riley	
2023-24	17	8	0	Lost Regional Semi-Finals Game (Wyoming Tri-unity Christian)	Kameron Riley	
2024-25	25	4	0	Lost Finals Game (Wyoming Tri-unity Christian)	Kameron Riley	
2025-26	23	3	0	Lost Regional Finals Game (Wyoming Tri-unity Christian)	Kameron Riley	
Totals	929	416	2	All-time MHSAA regular & postseason record (1950–2025)		
* Regular season results unavailable

=== Girls basketball ===
Season	Regular season			Postseason results	Head coach	Refs
Season	W	L	T	Postseason results	Head coach	Refs
1989-90				Lost Finals Game (Carney-Nadeau)		
1990-91				State Champions (Potterville)	Tom O'Rourke	
1998-99				Lost Finals Game (Portland St. Patrick)		
2006-07	15	7	0	Lost Regionals Game (Portland St. Patrick)		
2007-08	8	12	0	Lost District Game (New Lothrop)		
2008-09	8	11	0	Lost District Game (New Lothrop)		
2009-10	8	9	0	Lost District Game (Dansville)		
2010-11	11	14	0	Lost Regionals Game (Portland St. Patrick)	Nathan George	
2011-12	5	16	0	Lost Districts Game (Mt Pleasant Sacred Heart)	Nathan George	
2012-13	13	8	0	Lost Districts Game (Fulton)	Nathan George	
2013-14	16	7	0	Lost Regionals Game (Fruitport Calvary Christian)	Nathan George	
2014-15	10	12	0	Lost Districts Game (Portland St. Patrick)	Nathan George	
2015-16	11	10	0	Lost Districts Game (Portland St. Patrick)	Nathan George	
2016-17	5	16	0	Lost Districts Game (Portland St. Patrick)	Nathan George	
2017-18	10	12	0	Lost Districts Game (Fulton)	Nathan George	
2018-19	17	8	0	Lost Semi-Finals Game (Adrian Lenawee Christian)	Nathan George	
2019-20	20	4	0	COVID-19 Cancelled Regionals Game (Battle Creek Calhoun Christian)	Nathan George	
2020-21	16	4	0	State Champions (Bellaire)	Nathan George	
2021-22	24	3	0	State Champions (Plymouth Christian Academy)	Nathan George	
2022-23	20	8	0	Lost Semi-Finals Game (Baraga)	Nathan George	
2023-24	24	4	0	Lost Semi-Finals Game (Ishpeming)	Nathan George	
2024-25	27	2	0	State Champions (Ewen Trout-creek)	Nathan George	
2025-26	10	14	0	Lost District Finals Game (Portland St. Patrick)	Nathan George	
Totals				All-time MHSAA regular & postseason record (1950–2025)		
* Regular season results unavailable

== Notable alumni ==
- Mason Pline, NFL tight end for the Kansas City Chiefs
- Todd Simon, current head basketball coach at Bowling Green State University
