= Mason Pline =

American football player (born 2000)

DC Defenders
- Position: Tight end
- Roster status: Unsigned draft pick

Personal information
- Born: February 5, 2000 (age 26); Fowler, Michigan, U.S.
- Listed height: 6 ft 7 in (2.01 m)
- Listed weight: 260 lb (118 kg)

Career information
- High school: Fowler (Fowler, Michigan)
- College: Ferris State (2019–2022); Furman (2023)
- NFL draft: 2024: undrafted

Career history
- San Francisco 49ers (2024)*; New Orleans Saints (2025); Kansas City Chiefs (2026)*; DC Defenders (2027-present)
- * Offseason or practice squad member only
- Stats at Pro Football Reference

Mason Pline (born February 5, 2000) is an American professional football tight end. He previously signed with the San Francisco 49ers as an undrafted free agent following the 2024 NFL draft. Pline was also a member of the New Orleans Saints during the 2025 NFL season. He played college football for the Ferris State Bulldogs and the Furman Paladins.

== Early life ==
Pline was born in 2000 in Fowler Michigan. Standing 6 ft 6 in (1.98 m) tall and weighing 225 pounds (102 kg), Pline was a three-sport athlete. He played baseball, basketball and football. In football, Pline played tight end and defensive end positions with the Fowler Eagles team. In basketball, Pline averaged 13 points, eight rebounds and four assists and earned all-state, all-area and all-conference honors. He graduated in 2018.

== College career ==
=== Ferris State ===
First attending Ferris State, Pline played three seasons of basketball with the Bulldogs team before committing to football full-time in 2021. During his first three seasons of college football, Pline played halfback and tight end with the Bulldogs team. Pline graduated with a bachelor's degree in Mechanical Engineering.

=== Furman University ===
Pline transferred to Furman University for his senior season of college football, enrolling in a master's program in Strategic Design. He joined the Furman Paladins as a tight end for the 2023 season. He played in all 13 games finishing his only season with 32 receptions and four touchdowns. He earned a certificate in Design and Visual Communications.

== Professional career ==
Pre-draft measurables
Height	Weight	Arm length	Hand span	Wingspan	40-yard dash	10-yard split	20-yard split	20-yard shuttle	Three-cone drill	Vertical jump	Broad jump
6 ft 6 3/8 in (1.99 m)	251 lb (114 kg)	33 in (0.84 m)	10 1/8 in (0.26 m)	6 ft 6 3/4 in (2.00 m)	4.81 s	1.64 s	2.77 s	4.65 s	7.44 s	33.0 in (0.84 m)	9 ft 10 in (3.00 m)
All values from Pro Day

=== San Francisco 49ers ===
On April 27, 2024, Pline signed with the San Francisco 49ers as an undrafted free agent following the 2024 NFL draft. He spent the 2024 NFL Season on the practice squad. On January 6, 2025, Pline signed a reserve/futures contract with the 49ers.

On August 4, 2025, Pline was waived by the 49ers.

=== New Orleans Saints ===
On August 5, 2025, the New Orleans Saints claimed Pline off waivers following his departure from the 49ers. On August 13, Pline was placed on season-ending injured reserve due to an upper–body injury.

=== Kansas City Chiefs ===
On June 18, 2026, Pline signed with the Kansas City Chiefs following the vacancy made by Wanya Morris' trade to the Atlanta Falcons. On August 30, he was waived by Kansas City as a part of final roster cuts.
