= Todd Simon (basketball) =

American basketball coach (born 1980)

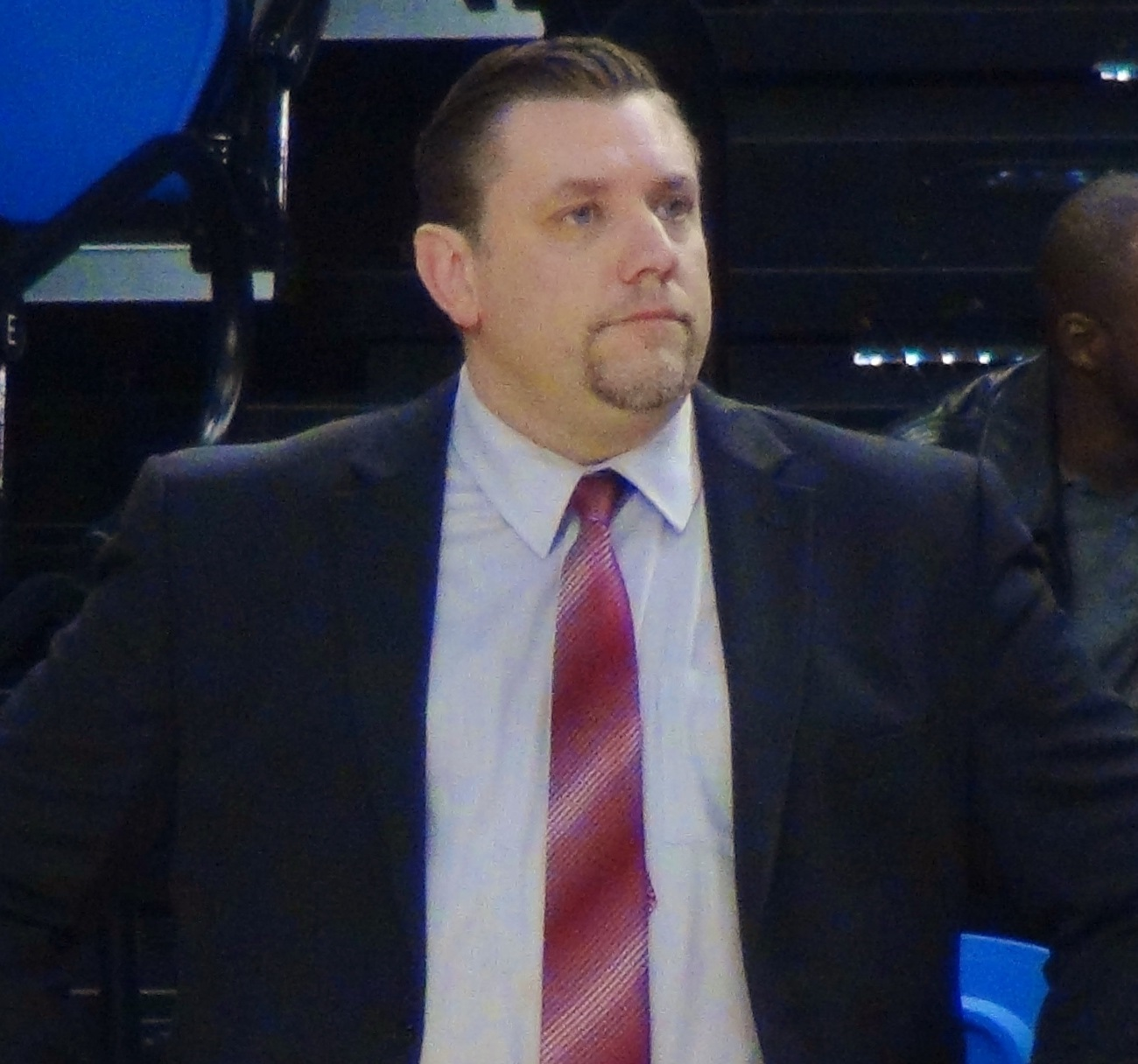
- Simon in 2016

Current position
- Title: Head coach
- Team: Bowling Green
- Conference: MAC
- Record: 52–46 (.531)

Biographical details
- Born: August 3, 1980 (age 46); Fowler, Michigan, U.S.
- Education: Central Michigan ('03); UNLV ('10)

Coaching career (HC unless noted)
- 2002–2003: Harrison Community HS (assistant)
- 2003–2004: Pepperdine (volunteer asst.)
- 2006–2012: Findlay Prep (associate HC)
- 2012–2013: Findlay Prep
- 2013–2016: UNLV (associate HC)
- 2016: UNLV (interim)
- 2016–2023: Southern Utah
- 2023–present: Bowling Green

Administrative career (AD unless noted)
- 2004–2006: UNLV (video assistant)

Head coaching record
- Overall: 179–160 (.528) (college); 35–1 (.972) (high school)
- Tournaments: 1–2 (CIT); 3–1 (TBC)

Accomplishments and honors

Championships
- Big Sky regular season (2021)

Awards
- Big Sky Coach of the Year (2021); Jim Phelan National Coach of the Year Award (2021)

Todd Andrew Simon (born August 3, 1980) is an American college basketball coach who is the current head coach at Bowling Green State University.

== Early life and education ==
Born in Fowler, Michigan, Simon graduated from Fowler High School in 1999 and Central Michigan University in 2003 as a double major in sport studies and management information systems. He was on full academic scholarship as a recipient of Central Michigan's Centralis Scholarship. In 2010, Simon completed a master's degree in sport education leadership at the University of Nevada, Las Vegas (UNLV).

Simon suffers from Charcot-Marie-Tooth disease, a form of muscular dystrophy, a hereditary disorder.

== Coaching career ==
=== Harrison Community HS / Pepperdine / UNLV ===
In the 2002–03 school year, Simon was junior varsity boys' basketball head coach and a varsity assistant coach at Harrison Community High School in Harrison, Michigan. Simon then was a volunteer assistant at Pepperdine University in the 2003–04 season under Paul Westphal before becoming a video assistant under Lon Kruger at UNLV from 2004 to 2006.

=== Findlay Prep ===
From 2006 to 2012, Simon was part of the founding staff as an assistant coach at basketball power Findlay Prep in Henderson, Nevada before assuming the head coach spot for the 2012–13 season. From 2007 until his departure in 2013, Findlay was 192-9 with 3 National High School Invitational Championships. As Head Coach in '12-'13, Simon set a program record with 35 victories and finished 35-1 and shared a mythical National Title as co-#1 in the final Bluestar Media Poll.

During his time at Findlay, Simon helped develop and coach a number of top NBA draft picks, including Anthony Bennett, who was selected as the top overall pick in 2013, and other first round picks Tristan Thompson, Avery Bradley, Cory Joseph. Other NBA player's Simon coached at Findlay include Christian Wood, Jorge Gutierrez, Jabari Brown, Deandre Liggins, Nick Johnson, Naz Long, and Nigel Williams-Goss. In addition, MLB pitcher Amir Garrett played at Findlay during his tenure.

=== UNLV ===
In 2013, Simon returned to UNLV as an associate head coach, this time under Dave Rice. As recruiting coordinator, UNLV had the #4 recruiting class nationally in 2014 and #11 class in 2015 including signing 2 McDonald's All-Americans and a Jordan Brand All-American. During Simon's 3 years at UNLV, 6 Runnin' Rebels made the NBA; Khem Birch, Patrick McCaw, Rashad Vaughn, Stephen Zimmerman, Derrick Jones Jr. and Bryce Dejean-Jones.

When head coach Dave Rice was dismissed after an 0-3 conference start on January 10, 2016, Simon was named interim head coach of the Runnin' Rebels. The Runnin' Rebels had lost 6 of 8 games when Simon was named interim head coach and led the team to a 9–8 record in 17 games as head coach despite playing with as few as 5 scholarship players due to injuries.

=== Southern Utah ===
Following the 2015-16 season, Simon was hired as head coach for Southern Utah.

In the 2022-23 season, Simon led the Thunderbirds to a 22-12 record overall (12-6 WAC), finishing second in the WAC regular season, losing to Grand Canyon in the 2023 WAC men's basketball tournament. Multiple Thunderbirds were named to the WAC All-Conference teams: Tevian Jones (All-WAC 1st Team), Maizen Fausett (All-WAC 2nd Team), Drake Allen (WAC All-Newcomer Team), and Dee Barnes (Sixth Man of the Year). Prior to the team competing at the CBI, it was announced that Simon would be taking the job at Bowling Green.

=== Bowling Green ===
On March 15, 2023, Todd Simon was named the head basketball coach at Bowling Green State University. In his first season at BGSU, the Falcons went 20-13, finishing in 5th place in the Mid-American Conference. That season, he led Marcus Hill to a first team All-MAC selection as the conference’s leading scorer, as well as coaching Rashaun Agee to a second team All-MAC selection. In the MAC tournament, the Falcons upset Central Michigan in the quarterfinals, BGSU’s first win in the tournament since reaching the finals in 2019.

== Head coaching record ==
Record table
Season	Team	Overall	Conference	Standing	Postseason
UNLV Runnin' Rebels (Mountain West Conference) (2016)
2016	UNLV	9–8	8–7	T–6th	
UNLV:		9–8 (.529)	8–7 (.533)		
Southern Utah Thunderbirds (Big Sky Conference) (2016–2022)
2016–17	Southern Utah	6–27	3–15	T–11th	
2017–18	Southern Utah	13–19	5–13	10th	
2018–19	Southern Utah	17–17	9–11	7th	CIT Second Round
2019–20	Southern Utah	17–15	9–11	7th	
2020–21	Southern Utah	20–4	12–2	1st	
2021–22	Southern Utah	23–12	14–6	2nd	TBC Semifinals
Southern Utah Thunderbirds (Western Athletic Conference) (2022–2023)
2022–23	Southern Utah	22–12	12–6	3rd	CBI Semifinals*
Southern Utah:		118–106 (.527)	64–64 (.500)		
Bowling Green (Mid-American Conference) (2023–present)
2023–24	Bowling Green	20–14	10–8	5th	CIT Quarterfinals
2024–25	Bowling Green	14–18	8–10	8th	
2025–26	Bowling Green	18–14	9–9	T–5th	
Bowling Green:		52–46 (.531)	27–27 (.500)		
Total:		179–160 (.528)			
National champion Postseason invitational champion Conference regular season champion Conference regular season and conference tournament champion Division regular season champion Division regular season and conference tournament champion Conference tournament champion

*Simon left for Bowling Green prior to the 2023 CBI and did not coach in the Thunderbirds' games.
