= 2021–22 Michigan Tech Huskies men's basketball team =

American college basketball season

2021–22 Michigan Tech Huskies men's basketball
- Conference: Great Lakes Intercollegiate Athletic Conference
- Record: 21–7 (16–4 GLIAC)
- Head coach: Josh Buettner (1st season)
- Assistant coaches: Rae Drake (4th season); Ben Stelzer (1st season)
- Home arena: SDC Gymnasium

2021–22 Great Lakes Intercollegiate Athletic Conference men's basketball standings
	Conf.				Overall
Team	W		L	PCT	W		L	PCT
1Y. Ferris State	16	–	4	.800	22	–	9	.710
2Y. Michigan Tech	16	–	4	.800	21	–	7	.750
3Y. Northern Michigan	12	–	8	.600	18	–	12	.600
4Y. Saginaw Valley St.	12	–	8	.600	19	–	11	.633
5. Grand Valley St	11	–	9	.550	17	–	11	.607
6. Lake Superior St.	11	–	9	.550	16	–	11	.593
7. Parkside	10	–	9	.526	14	–	14	.500
8. Davenport †	10	–	10	.500	17	–	14	.548
Purdue Northwest	4	–	16	.200	7	–	21	.250
Wayne State	4	–	16	.200	5	–	18	.217
Northwood	3	–	16	.158	5	–	21	.192
† 2022 GLIAC tournament winner Rankings from Poll

The 2021–22 Michigan Tech Huskies men's basketball team represented Michigan Tech in the 2021–22 NCAA Division II men's basketball season. The Huskies were led by a 1st-year head coach Josh Buettner and played their home games at SDC Gymnasium in Houghton, Michigan as members of the GLIAC. The Huskies finished the season 21–7, and 16–4 in GLIAC play. As a 2-seed in the GLIAC Tournament, the Huskies beat Parkside 66–53, but lost to rival, and 3–seed, Northern Michigan in the second round. The team did not receive an at-large bid for the NCAA Tournament.

== Previous season ==
=== Regular season ===
The Huskies finished 12–6 in the GLIAC and overall in the 2020–21 season prior to the GLIAC tournament

=== Postseason ===
The Huskies ended the regular were the 3-seed in the GLIAC Tournament. They defeated then 6-seed Purdue Northwest in the first round and Grand Valley State in the second round. During the GLIAC championship, the huskies trailed Ashland University 44–42 at halftime, and was outscored 41–35 in the second half. This made Ashland University the champions of the GLIAC 2020–21 season. Michigan Tech got into the NCAA (DII) Tournament as a 2-seed, in the field of 48, meaning they got a one-game bye. The Huskies got to go against Southern Indiana, and won 81–69. They went on to lose to then 1-seed Truman St in the next round, ending their run in the NCAA Tournament.

== Offseason ==
=== Coaching changes ===
Kevin Luke, who has been head coach for Michigan Tech's men's basketball team for 27 seasons and has been part of the Huskies program for another 7 years, has retired on April 15, 2021. On April 16, 2021, Associate Coach Josh Buettner had been promoted to become the new head coach of the Huskies program. Buettner has been Associate head coach for 13 seasons leading up to the promotion. On June 23, Michigan Tech alum Ben Stelzer was hired as an assistant coach under head coach Josh Buettner after playing professionally overseas.

=== Departures ===
Name	Number	Pos.	Height	Weight	Year	Hometown	Notes
Dawson Bilski	14	G	6'3"	190	Sr	Powers, MI	Graduated
Isaac Appleby	5	G	6'2"	190	Sr	Eau Claire, WI	Graduated

=== 2021 recruiting class ===
Around March 30, 2021, Dawson Nordgaard, a Forward from De Pere, Wisconsin signed his letter of intent to attend the Michigan Tech program in the 2021-22 season. Nordgaard's parents, grandparents, and great-grandparents all were college athletes.

College recruiting information
Name	Hometown	School	Height	Weight	Commit date
Dawson Nordgaard; F	De Pere, WI	West De Pere High School	6 ft 8 in (2.03 m)	160 lb (73 kg)	March 30, 2021 (signed)
Dawson Nordgaard; F	Recruit ratings: Scout: Rivals: 247Sports: (N/A)				
Overall recruit ranking:
Note: In many cases, Scout, Rivals, 247Sports, On3, and ESPN may conflict in their listings of height and weight.; In these cases, the average was taken. ESPN grades are on a 100-point scale.; Sources:

== Preseason ==
=== Preseason GLIAC Poll ===
In the Pre-season rankings for the GLIAC North, Michigan Tech was narrowly projected to finish first, just ahead of Ferris State.

=== Preseason rankings ===
While the Huskies didn't receive any votes in the primary D2SIDA poll for the Top 25, The Huskies are number 7 in the Midwest rankings.

=== Exhibition ===
On November 3, Michigan Tech visited Division I opponent Ball State.

The game was tied at 31 at the end of the first half. The Huskies outscored the Cardinals 31–14 over the next 13 minutes and 27 seconds to make it a 62–45 lead. In the ensuing 15 minutes and 43 seconds, Ball State's crew tied the game at 69 a piece. Following a shooting foul on Ball State's T. Cochran, Owen White made 1 of 2 free throws. Ball State would end up missing their next two 2-point attempts, giving the Huskies a 70–69 victory against Ball State.

Tech scoring was led by Trent Bell with 17 points and Eric Carl with 13. Rebounding was led by Owen White with 8 and Carter Johnston with 7.

== Regular season ==
=== Early non-conference games ===
==== McKendree ====
On November 12, the Huskies travelled to Romeoville, Illinois, to play McKendree in Day 1 of the GLVC/GLIAC Challenge. The Huskies weren't able to keep the game super close in the first half, trailing by as much as 11 with 7:29 left in the first half, and ending the first half behind 27-37. Despite the Huskies' best attempts to cut into McKendree's second-half lead, McKendree wound up winning by 15, outscoring Tech 37-32 in the second half. Hobson and White led the Huskies in scoring, getting a combined 33 points of Tech's 59 points. White also recorded 7 rebounds and tied with three other players in assists, recording 2 of the Huskies' eight assists. They fell to 0-1 in the season.

==== Lewis ====
The day after losing to McKendree, the Huskies participated in Day 2 of the GLVC/GLIAC Challenge, playing against Lewis. Shooting 48% from the field, the Huskies trailed by as much as 8 to Lewis, as Lewis scored 8 of the first 10 points of the game. Tech eventually cut into the deficit to trail 28-30 at the half. The Huskies continued this trend to outscore Lewis 36-26 in the second half, winning 64-56. White and Carl led the Huskies with 22 points each, shooting a combined 15-of-26 from the field, and 8-of-18 from beyond the arc. Bell led rebounding for the Huskies with 12. Johnston led with 5 assists. The Huskies are now 1-1 under their new head coach.

==== Minnesota Crookston ====
There was a 1-week interval between playing against Lewis at a neutral site and playing Minnesota Crookston. The Huskies had control of the score since the first basket was made 42 seconds into the game, starting the game on a 10-0 run through 16:47, when Crookston got their first pair of points. Led by Owen White and Trent Bell, Michigan Tech would outscore Minnesota Crookston 54-31 in the first half, which was their biggest lead of the half. Over the first 11 minutes and 23 seconds of the second half, Crookston outscored Michigan Tech 29-13. Led by a varying group of players, Michigan Tech weren't able to grow that 9-point lead by much over the remaining eight minutes, eventually winning by 11, 83-72. Owen White led scoring with 24 points, with Eric Carl providing an additional 20 points. Trent Bell led rebounding, getting seven throughout the game. 10 of the 17 assists were split between Johnston and Carl, with both getting 5 assists.

==== Minnesota Duluth ====
Minnesota-Duluth visited Michigan Tech and found their way to a 34-point victory through Drew Blair's first career Double-Double with 15 points and 11 rebounds on 5-of-13 shooting. The Huskies were limited to a 29.6% shooting percentage during the game as no Tech player reached double digits in points, Owen White being the closest at a team-high nine points. The team had several issues they hope to fix when St. Cloud State visits on November 28.

==== St. Cloud State ====
The Huskies hoped to rebound a day after their 34-point loss to Minnesota Duluth, and were able to do so against St. Cloud State, winning 90-76, despite being down 46-39 at the half, with Trent Bell's double-double, his first of the season. Bell had 19 points, 13 rebounds, 2 assists, a block and a steal. Owen White led the Huskies in scoring with 25 points. The team shot 52.5% from the field and went 13-for-14 from the Free Throw Line, while limiting St. Cloud State to 48.1% from the field and 5-for-19 from beyond the arc.

=== Early conference games ===
==== Northwood ====
In hopes to continue their win streak, Michigan Tech visited Northwood to try and get a win; the Huskies did just that and more. After the game was tied at 15-all early in the first half, the Huskies found their way to a 16-point, 51-35 lead at the half. En route to extending their win streak, and starting conference play on a good note, Owen White led the Huskies with 22 points, 7 rebounds, 8 assists, and 2 steals. Tech went 54.5% from beyond the arc and 39-65 (60%) overall, besting Northwood in every category, except for Free Throw Percentage (66%-78%) and blocks, both teams blocking one goal.

==== Northern Michigan ====
During rivalry games, the away team always want to try to keep the game close, and that's what Northern Michigan were able to do during the second half of this game's matchup. Tech shot 49.1% from the field, with three players in double-digits, in a game that they one by one point. After leading 36-29 at the half, the Huskies were outscored 47-41 in the second half to narrowly beat the Wildcats 77-76, thanks to a made free throw made between a pair of Wildcat three-pointers in the last couple seconds of the game. Adam Hobson led all players with a career-high 22 points, along with 4 rebounds and a block.

==== Lake Superior State ====
In game two of seven during the Huskies homestead, the Huskies were able to hold off a late Lake Superior State push, with their lead getting as low as 65–61 with 39 seconds remaining in the game. During his performance, Trent Bell recorded yet another Double-Double with 14 points, 10 rebounds, 7 assists, and a block, leading the team in rebounds and assists, tying Owen White in leading the team in points, and being 1 of 4 players to get a block. Michigan Tech shot 47.4% from the field, going 6-24 from beyond the arc, and shooting 10-13 from the free throw line. Of these three shooting percentages, Lake Superior State only lead in one and that was when they went 7-of-24 from three. This win extends their win streak to four in time for the Huskies to host Ferris State on December 11.

==== #20 Ferris State ====
With Michigan Tech down 21-38 at the half and struggling with shooting throughout the game, #20 Ferris State routed the Huskies 71-48. Ferris State outperformed the Huskies in every category except assists, where both teams had 13, steals (MTU had 7 vs 3), and personal fouls. Despite this performance, Michigan Tech still has a chance to perform well in the GLIAC and in their remaining non-conference games.

=== Remaining non-conference games ===
==== Finlandia ====
In game four of their homestead, and just four days after losing by 23 to Ferris State, Michigan Tech plays 1-12 Finlandia. The Huskies ended up shooting 62% from the field, 16-of-30 from beyond the arc, and made 66.7% of their free throw attempts in a 70-point win, achieving a season-high 122 points, with seven players scoring double-digit points, and allowing a season-best 52-points. Just two of Finlandia's 16 players got 10 or more points.

=== Remaining conference games ===
==== Parkside ====
Despite a three-week pause since their 70-point win over Finlandia due to two cancelled games, the Huskies won by six, 59-53, featuring 18 turnovers throughout the game. The Huskies were led by Carter Johnston with 11 points, 6 boards, 5 assists, and 3 steals, and Brad Simonsen with 11 points, 2 boards, and 1 block. Since falling behind 16-23 with 7:27 left in the first half, Michigan Tech outscored the Parkside Rangers 43-30.

==== Purdue Northwest ====
Continuing their win streak to complete their 8-game homestead, Michigan Tech routed Purdue Northwest 83–55. The Huskies shot about 48.4% from the field and 51.7% from three. There were three players in double figures: Eric Carl with 22 points, Owen White with 17, and Adam Hobson with 12.

== Roster ==
2021–22 Michigan Tech Huskies men's basketball team
Players
Coaches

Pos.	#	Name	Height	Weight	Year	Previous school	Hometown
G	3	Adam Hobson	6 ft 4 in (1.93 m)	190 lb (86 kg)	So	Stoughton High School	Stoughton, WI
G	4	Jason Waterman	6 ft 0 in (1.83 m)	180 lb (82 kg)	So	Negaunee High School	Negaunee, MI
G	10	Matt Ojala	6 ft 1 in (1.85 m)	175 lb (79 kg)	RS So	Calumet HS	Mohawk, MI
G	11	Jalen Carter	5 ft 10 in (1.78 m)	175 lb (79 kg)	Sr	Lindblom HS	Chicago, Ill
F	12	Kyle Clow	6 ft 5 in (1.96 m)	200 lb (91 kg)	So	Germantown HS	Germantown, WI
G	15	Carter Johnston	6 ft 3 in (1.91 m)	185 lb (84 kg)	So	Beaverton HS	Beaverton, MI
G	20	Devin Schmitz	5 ft 11 in (1.8 m)	160 lb (73 kg)	Jr	Dollar Bay HS	Dollar Bay, MI
G	21	Eric Carl	6 ft 5 in (1.96 m)	190 lb (86 kg)	Jr	Kaukauna HS	Kaukauna, WI
G	21	Owen White	6 ft 6 in (1.98 m)	215 lb (98 kg)	Sr	Rhinelander HS	Rhinelander, WI
G	24	Logan Geissler	6 ft 1 in (1.85 m)	175 lb (79 kg)	So	Bay Port HS	Green Bay, WI
F	30	Brad Simonsen	6 ft 6 in (1.98 m)	210 lb (95 kg)	So	Houghton HS	Houghton, MI
F	32	Trent Bell	6 ft 7 in (2.01 m)	220 lb (100 kg)	Sr	Negaunee HS	Negaunee, MI
G/F	34	Pete Calcaterra	6 ft 6 in (1.98 m)	190 lb (86 kg)	So	Boyne City HS	Boyne City, MI
F	42	TeeAaron Powell	6 ft 9 in (2.06 m)	240 lb (109 kg)	Sr	Marian Catholic HS	South Holland, Ill
C	44	Tyler Robarge	6 ft 8 in (2.03 m)	230 lb (104 kg)	Jr	Chippewa Falls HS	Chippewa Falls, WI

Head coach

- Josh Buettner (Michigan Tech)

Assistant coach(es)

- Rae Drake Jr (Michigan Tech)

Legend

- (C) Team captain
- (S) Suspended
- (I) Ineligible
- (W) Walk-on
- Injured
- Current redshirt

== Schedule and results ==
On July 12, 2021, the Michigan Tech basketball program released their 2021-22 basketball schedule, featuring 27 games, 14 of which at SDC Gymnasium, and 18-22 conference matchups.

Date time, TV	Rank^{#}	Opponent^{#}	Result	Record	High points	High rebounds	High assists	Site (attendance) city, state
Exhibition Game
November 3, 2021*; 7:00 pm		at Ball State	W 70–69		17 – Bell	8 – White	8 – Johnston	Worthen Arena (1,721); Muncie, IN
Regular Season
November 12, 2021*; 6:00 pm		vs. McKendree; Lewis Tournament	L 59–74	0–1	17 – Hobson	7 – White	4 – Tied	Neil Carey Arena (312); Romeoville, IL
November 13, 2021*; 3:00 pm		vs. Lewis; Lewis Tournament	W 64–56	1–1	22 – Tied	12 – Bell	5 – Johnston	Neil Carey Arena (317); Romeoville, IL
November 20, 2021*; 3:00 pm		at Minnesota Crookston	W 83–72	2–1	24 – White	7 – Bell	5 – Tied	Lysaker Gym (287); Crookston, MN
November 27, 2021*; 2:00 pm		Minnesota-Duluth	L 42–76	2–2	9 – White	8 – Bell	2 – Tied	SDC Gymnasium (645); Houghton, MI
November 28, 2021*; 1:00 pm		St. Cloud State	W 90–76	3–2	25 – White	13 – Bell	9 – Johnston	SDC Gymnasium (558); Houghton, MI
December 4, 2021; 3:00 pm		at Northwood	W 98–75	4–2 (1–0)	22 – White	7 – White	8 – White	Riepma Arena (388); Midland, MI
December 6, 2021; 7:30 pm		Northern Michigan; Rivalry	W 77–76	5–2 (2–0)	22 – Hobson	6 – Carl	7 – White	SDC Gymnasium (674); Houghton, MI
December 9, 2021; 7:30 pm		Lake Superior State	W 70–64	6–2 (3–0)	17 – White	10 – Bell	7 – Bell	SDC Gymnasium (551); Houghton, MI
December 11, 2021; 2:00 pm		No. 20 Ferris State	L 48–71	6–3 (3–1)	16 – Hobson	8 – Bell	3 – Carl	SDC Gymnasium (948); Houghton, MI
December 15, 2021; 6:00 pm		Finlandia	W 122–52	7–3 (3–1)	17 – Bell	13 – Bell	5 – 2 Tied	SDC Gymnasium (367); Houghton, MI
December 20, 2021*; 1:00 pm		Winona State	Canceled due to COVID-19 issues at Winonia State					SDC Gymnasium; Houghton, MI
January 3, 2022*; 1:00 pm		OUA (Ontario)	Canceled due to COVID-19 issues at Ontario					SDC Gymnasium; Houghton, MI
January 6, 2022; 7:30 pm		Parkside	W 59–53	8–3 (4–1)	11 – 2 Tied	6 – Johnston	5 – Johnston	SDC Gymnasium (577); Houghton, MI
January 8, 2022; 1:00 pm		Purdue Northwest	W 83–55	9–3 (5–1)	22 – Carl	9 – Robarge	5 – Carter	SDC Gymnasium (608); Houghton, MI
January 13, 2022; 7:30 pm		at Wayne State	W 62–51	10–3 (6–1)	17 – Hobson	12 – White	5 – Carter	Wayne State Fieldhouse; Detroit, MI
January 15, 2022; 3:00 pm		at Saginaw Valley State	L 49–66	10–4 (6–2)	21 – Bell	10 – Bell	3 – 3 Tied	James E. O'Neill Jr. Arena (226); University Center, MI
January 20, 2022; 7:30 pm		Grand Valley State	L 74–80	10–5 (6–3)	21 – White	7 – 2 Tied	7 – Johnston	SDC Gymnasium (775); Houghton, MI
January 22, 2022; 2:00 pm		Davenport	W 73–61	11–5 (7–3)	18 – 2 Tied	16 – Bell	3 – 2 Tied	SDC Gymnasium (758); Houghton, MI
January 27, 2022; 7:30 pm		Northwood	W 89–48	12–5 (8–3)	23 – White	9 – Bell	7 – Hobson	SDC Gymnasium (651); Houghton, MI
January 31, 2022; 7:45 pm		Northern Michigan; Rivalry	W 64–62	13–5 (9–3)	13 – 2 Tied	7 – Johnston	5 – White	Berry Events Center (305); Marquette, MI
February 3, 2022; 7:00 pm		at Purdue Northwest	W 65–44	14–5 (10–3)	19 – White	15 – Bell	7 – Johnston	PNW Fitness Center (250); Hammond, IN
February 5, 2022; 4:00 pm		at Parkside	W 90–75	15–5 (11–3)	20 – Hobson	11 – Bell	9 – Johnston	De Simone Gymnasium (865); Kenosha, WI
February 10, 2022; 8:00 pm		at Davenport	W 84–72	16–5 (12–3)	28 – Hobson	11 – Bell	10 – White	DU Student Center (255); Grand Rapids, MI
February 12, 2022		at Grand Valley State	W 75–67	17–5 (13–3)	20 – White	13 – Bell	7 – Johnston	Fieldhouse Arena (852); Allendale, MI
February 17, 2022; 7:30 pm		Saginaw Valley State	W 77–71	18–5 (14–3)	19 – Bell	9 – White	7 – Johnston	SDC Gymnasium (829); Houghton, MI
February 19, 2022; 2:00 pm		Wayne State	W 82–57	19–5 (15–3)	23 – White	12 – White	5 – Bell	SDC Gymnasium (916); Houghton, MI
February 24, 2022; 7:30 pm		at No. 25 Ferris State	L 72–76 ^{OT}	19–6 (15–4)	24 – White	8 – White	8 – Johnston	Jim Wink Arena (1,377); Big Rapids, MI
February 26, 2022; 3:00 pm		at Lake Superior State	W 65-56	20–6 (16–4)	15 – Hobson	7 – 2 Tied	4 – Bell	Ronald Cooper Gymnasium; Sault Ste Marie, MI
GLIAC tournament
March 2, 2022; 7:30 pm	(2)	(7) Parkside; GLIAC Quarterfinals	W 66–53	21–6	20 – White	11 – Bell	5 – White	SDC Gymnasium (719); Houghton, MI
March 5, 2022; 12:00 pm	(2)	(3) Northern Michigan; GLIAC Quarterfinals	L 71–78	21–7	30 – White	11 – Bell	4 – Johnston	SDC Gymnasium (820); Houghton, MI
*Non-conference game. ^{#}Rankings from d2sida. (#) Tournament seedings in parentheses. All times are in Eastern Time.

== Rankings ==
The Huskies' ranks are taken from the D2SIDA Poll, and the Coaches Poll from NABC Coaches The top two rows are from the D2SIDA rankings; the top row is national, and the middle row is for the regional rankings, specifically the Midwest ranks, made up of the GLIAC, GLVC, and G-MAC.

Ranking movements Legend: ██ Increase in ranking ██ Decrease in ranking — = Not ranked
	Week															
Poll	Pre	1	2	3	4	5	6	7	8	9	10	11	12	13	14	Final
D2SIDA	—	—	—													
(Midwest)	7	10	10													
Coaches	—	—^	—													

^Coaches do not release a Week 1 poll.

== Awards and honors ==
=== In-season awards ===
Name	Award	Date
Owen White	GLIAC North Division Player of the Week	February 7, 2022
Owen White	GLIAC North Division Player of the Week	February 21, 2022
Trent Bell	GLIAC North Division Player of the Week	February 14, 2022

=== Postseason awards ===
==== Owen White ====
- NABC First Team All-District
- D2CCA First Team All-Region
- GLIAC Player of the Year
- First Team All-GLIAC
- GLIAC All-Defensive Team

==== Trent Bell ====
- All-GLIAC First Team
- All-GLIAC Defensive Team

==== Carter Johnston ====
- GLIAC All-Defensive Team
