= Dallas Township, Michigan =

- Civil township
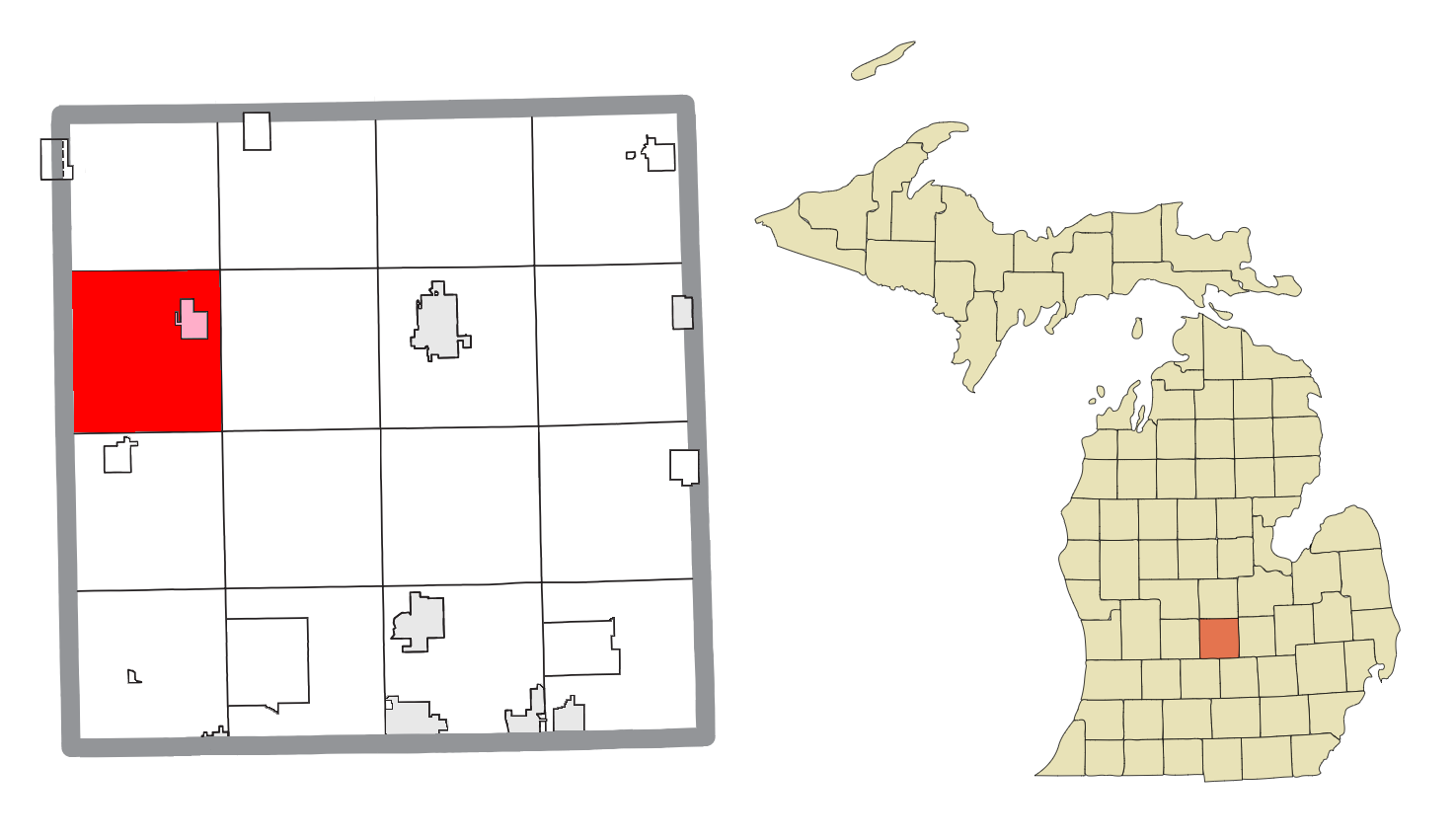
- Location within Clinton County (red) and the administered village of Fowler (pink)

- Location within the state of Michigan Location within the United States
- Coordinates: 42°59′23″N 84°46′08″W
- Country: United States
- State: Michigan
- County: Clinton
- Established: 1845

Government
  - Supervisor: Vern Feldpausch
  - Clerk: Therese Koenigsknecht

Area
  - Total: 36.51 sq mi (94.56 km^{2})
  - Land: 36.39 sq mi (94.25 km^{2})
  - Water: 0.12 sq mi (0.31 km^{2})
- Elevation: 728 ft (222 m)

Population (2020)
  - Total: 2,411
  - Density: 66.25/sq mi (25.58/km^{2})
- Time zone: UTC-5 (Eastern (EST))
  - Summer (DST): UTC-4 (EDT)
- ZIP code(s): 48835 (Fowler); 48873 (Pewamo); 48894 (Westphalia)
- Area code: 517
- FIPS code: 26-19620
- GNIS feature ID: 1626156
- Website: Official website

Dallas Township is a civil township of Clinton County in the U.S. state of Michigan. The population was 2,411 at the 2020 census. The township was established in 1845 from a section of Lebanon Township and named for vice president George M. Dallas.

== Communities ==
- The village of Fowler is located within the township on M-21.

== Geography ==
According to the United States Census Bureau, the township has a total area of 36.51 square miles (94.56 km^{2}), of which 36.39 square miles (94.25 km^{2}) is land and 0.12 square miles (0.31 km^{2}) (0.33%) is water.

Dallas Township is located in western Clinton County and is bordered by Ionia County to the west.

== Demographics ==
As of the census of 2000, there were 2,323 people, 781 households, and 606 families residing in the township. The population density was 63.5 inhabitants per square mile (24.5/km^{2}). There were 804 housing units at an average density of 22.0 per square mile (8.5/km^{2}). The racial makeup of the township was 99.31% White, 0.13% Native American, 0.22% Asian, 0.13% from other races, and 0.22% from two or more races. Hispanic or Latino of any race were 1.12% of the population.

There were 781 households, out of which 40.2% had children under the age of 18 living with them, 69.9% were married couples living together, 5.5% had a female householder with no husband present, and 22.3% were non-families. 18.8% of all households were made up of individuals, and 8.8% had someone living alone who was 65 years of age or older. The average household size was 2.97 and the average family size was 3.46.

In the township the population was spread out, with 31.0% under the age of 18, 9.9% from 18 to 24, 27.3% from 25 to 44, 20.4% from 45 to 64, and 11.3% who were 65 years of age or older. The median age was 33 years. For every 100 females, there were 107.8 males. For every 100 females age 18 and over, there were 103.3 males.

The median income for a household in the township was $50,156, and the median income for a family was $60,417. Males had a median income of $40,194 versus $27,008 for females. The per capita income for the township was $18,085. About 2.4% of families and 3.3% of the population were below the poverty line, including 3.1% of those under age 18 and 4.6% of those age 65 or over.
