= Zephyr (cloth) =

Sheer lightweight cotton fabric

Zephyr or zephyr cloth is a sheer, lightweight cotton fabric, usually plain woven, used for dresses, blouses, and shirts. It may be striped or checked. It is named after Zephyr, the Greek god of the west wind.
