= 2021–22 NCAA Division II men's basketball rankings =

Rankings for the 2021-22 NCAA Division II men's basketball season

2021–22 NCAA Division I men's basketball rankings
- Season: 2021–22
- NCAA Tournament: 2022
- Preseason No. 1: Northwest Missouri State
NCAA Division I men's basketball rankings


Two human polls make up the 2021–22 NCAA Division II men's basketball rankings, the AP Poll and the Coaches Poll, in addition to various publications' preseason polls.

== Legend ==
	Increase in ranking
	Decrease in ranking
	New to rankings from previous week
Italics	Number of first place votes
(#–#)	Win–loss record
т	Tied with team above or below also with this symbol

== D2SIDA Poll ==
	Preseason Nov 3	Week 2 Nov 16	Week 3 Nov 23	Week 4	Week 5	Week 6	Week 7	Week 8	Week 9	Week 10	Week 11	Week 12	Week 13	Week 14	Week 15	Week 16	Week 17	Week 18	Week 19	Week 20	
1.	Northwest Missouri State (15)	West Texas A&M (5–0) (11)	Lubbock Christian (4–0) (6)																		1.
2.	Flagler	Northwest Missouri State (3–1) (2)	Northwest Missouri St (4–1) (7)																		2.
3.	West Texas A&M	Lubbock Christian (2–0) т	Indiana (PA) (4–0) (1)																		3.
4.	Lubbock Christian	Hillsdale (2–0) т	West Liberty (4–0)																		4.
5.	Hillsdale	Indiana (PA) (2–0)	Queens (NC) (4–0)																		5.
6.	Indiana (PA)	West Liberty (2–0)	Embry-Riddle (6–0)																		6.
7.	West Liberty	Queens (NC) (2–0)	West Texas A&M (5–1)																		7.
8.	Valdosta State	Truman State (2–0)	Truman State (4–0)																		8.
9.	Nova Southeastern	Point Loma (2–0)	Ferris State (4–0)																		9.
10.	Colorado Mesa	Nova Southeastern (1–0)	Nova Southeastern (2–0) (1)																		10.
11.	Washburn	Embry-Riddle (4–0)	Augustana (4–0)																		11.
12.	St. Thomas Aquinas	Saint Anselm (0–0)	Chico State (3–0)																		12.
13.	Point Loma	Lincoln Memorial (2–0)	Mercyhurst (4–0)																		13.
14.	Queens (NC)	Flagler (1–1)	Hillsdale (3–1)																		14.
15.	Truman State	Mercyhurst (2–0)	Bentley (2–0)																		15.
16.	Saint Anselm	Southern Indiana (0–0)	UNC Pembroke (4–0)																		16.
17.	Colorado School of Mines	Oklahoma Baptist (2–0)	Southern Indiana (1–0)																		17.
18.	Southern Indiana	Dallas Baptist (2–0)	Fairmount State (4–0)																		18.
19.	Lincoln Memorial	Chico State (2–0)	Cal St-San Bernardino (4–0)																		19.
20.	Seattle Pacific	Augustana (2–0)	Lincoln Memorial (4–0)																		20.
21.	Mercyhurst	Fairmount State (2–0)	Dominican (NY) (4–0)																		21.
22.	Lee	Washburn (1–1)	Cal Poly Pomona (4–0) т																		22.
23.	Fairmont State	Valdosta State (1–1)	Point Loma (2–2) т																		23.
24.	Daemen	Lee (1–1)	Oklahoma Baptist (2–1)																		24.
25.	Minnesota State Moorhead	Cal St-San Bernardino (2–0) т Bentley (1–0) т	UC Colorado Springs (3–0)																		25.
	Preseason Nov 3	Week 2 Nov 16	Week 3 Nov 23	Week 4	Week 5	Week 6	Week 7	Week 8	Week 9	Week 10	Week 11	Week 12	Week 13	Week 14	Week 15	Week 16	Week 17	Week 18	Week 19	Week 20	
		Dropped: Colorado Mesa (2–3); St. Thomas Aquinas (2–2); Colorado School of Mines (0–2); Seattle Pacific (1–4); Daemen (1–2); Minnesota State Moorhead (2–3)	Dropped: Saint Anselm (0–2); Flagler (3–2); Dallas Baptist (3–1); Washburn (2–2); Valdosta State (2–1); Lee (2–2)	None	None	None	None	None	None	None	None	None	None	None	None	None	None	None	None	None	

== NABC Coaches Poll ==
	Preseason Nov 3	Week 2 Nov 21	Week 3	Week 4	Week 5	Week 6	Week 7	Week 8	Week 9	Week 10	Week 11	Week 12	Week 13	Week 14	Week 15	Week 16	Week 17	Week 18	Week 19	Week 20	
1.	NW Missouri St (15)	Lubbock Christian (4–0) (3)																			1.
2.	Flagler	Truman State (4–0) (9)																			2.
3.	West Texas A&M	NW Missouri St (4–1) (3)																			3.
4.	Colorado Mesa (1)	Mercyhurst (4–0)																			4.
5.	Colorado School of Mines	Queens (NC) (4–0)																			5.
6.	Truman State	West Texas A&M (5–1)																			6.
7.	Hillsdale	West Liberty (4–0)																			7.
8.	St. Thomas Aquinas	Nova Southeastern (2–0)																			8.
9.	Lubbock Christian	Indiana (PA) (4–0)																			9.
10.	Valdosta State	Fairmount State (4–0)																			10.
11.	Washburn	Cal Poly Pomona (4–0)																			11.
12.	Mercyhurst	Chico State (3–0)																			12.
13.	Nova Southeastern	Augustana (4–0) (1)																			13.
14.	West Liberty	Ferris State (4–0)																			14.
15.	Northern State (SD)	Embry-Riddle (6–0)																			15.
16.	Queens (NC)	Hillsdale (3–1)																			16.
17.	Lincoln Memorial	Augusta (3–0)																			17.
18.	Indiana (PA)	Angelo State (4–0)																			18.
19.	Dallas Baptist	Hawai'i Hilo (4–0)																			19.
20.	Alabama Huntsville	Valdosta State (2–1)																			20.
21.	Seattle Pacific	Cal St-San Bernardino (4–0)																			21.
22.	Fairmount State	Lincoln Memorial (3–1)																			22.
23.	Florida Southern	Grand Valley State (2–0)																			23.
24.	Point Loma	Southern New Hampshire (4–0)																			24.
25.	Charleston (WV)	Dallas Baptist																			25.
	Preseason Nov 3	Week 2 Nov 21	Week 3	Week 4	Week 5	Week 6	Week 7	Week 8	Week 9	Week 10	Week 11	Week 12	Week 13	Week 14	Week 15	Week 16	Week 17	Week 18	Week 19	Week 20	
		Dropped: Flagler; Colorado Mesa; Colorado School of Mines; St. Thomas Aquinas; Washburn; Northern State (ND); Alabama Huntsville; Seattle Pacific; Florida Southern; Point Loma; Charleston (WV)	None	None	None	None	None	None	None	None	None	None	None	None	None	None	None	None	None	None	

== See also ==
2021–22 NCAA Division II women's basketball rankings
