= Fowler, Michigan =

- Village
- Village of Fowler
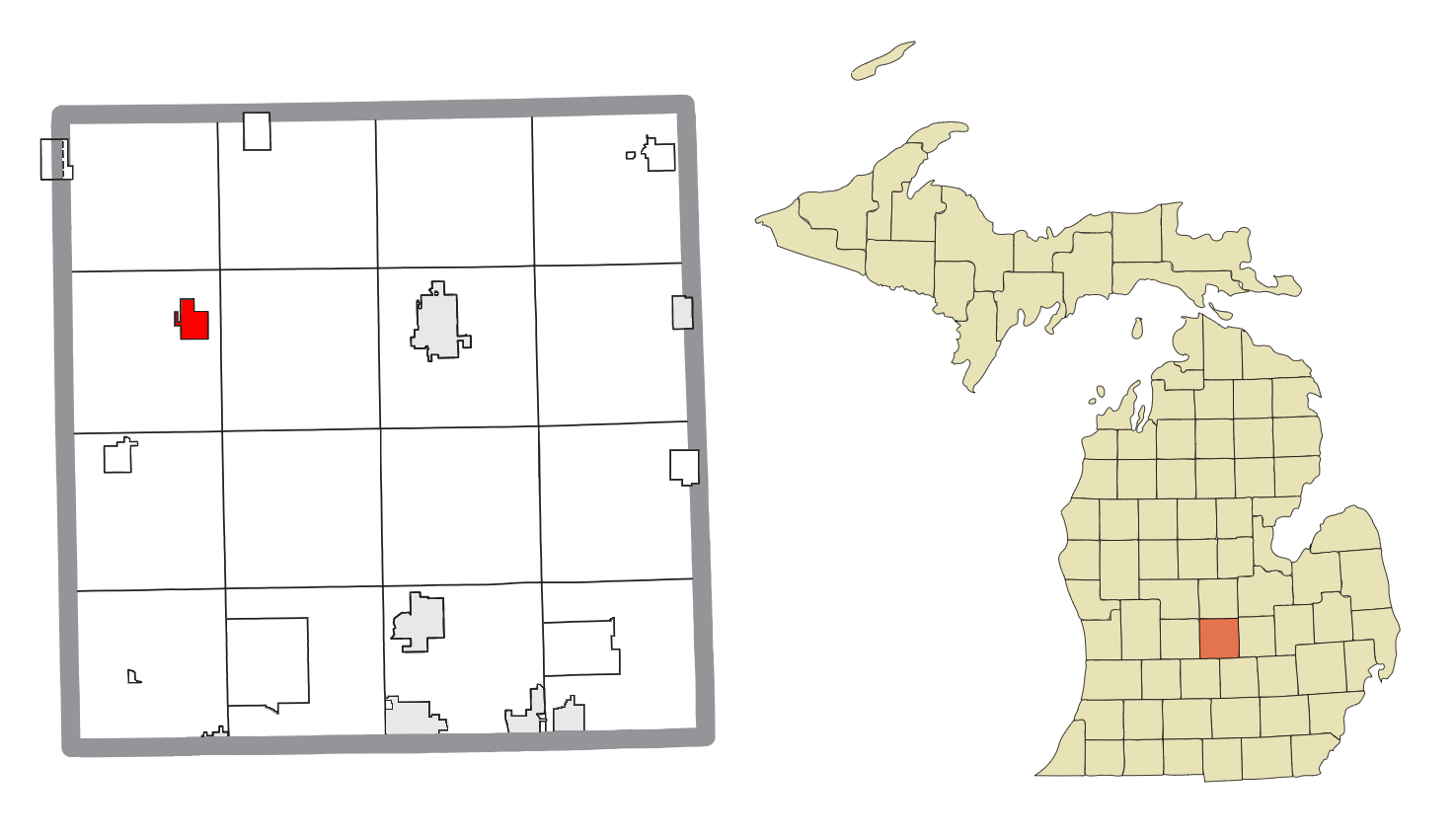
- Location within Clinton County

- Location within the state of Michigan Location within the United States
- Coordinates: 43°00′08″N 84°44′25″W
- Country: United States
- State: Michigan
- County: Clinton
- Township: Dallas
- Settled: 1867
- Platted: 1870
- Incorporated: 1885

Government
  - Type: Village council
  - President: Vernon J. Thelen
  - Clerk: Rhonda Feldpausch

Area
  - Total: 1.31 sq mi (3.39 km^{2})
  - Land: 1.28 sq mi (3.32 km^{2})
  - Water: 0.027 sq mi (0.07 km^{2})
- Elevation: 745 ft (227 m)

Population (2020)
  - Total: 1,226
  - Density: 955.8/sq mi (369.05/km^{2})
- Time zone: UTC-5 (Eastern (EST))
  - Summer (DST): UTC-4 (EDT)
- ZIP code(s): 48835
- Area code: 989
- FIPS code: 26-30040
- GNIS feature ID: 2398910
- Website: Official website

Fowler is a village in Clinton County in the U.S. state of Michigan. The population was 1,226 at the 2020 census. The village is located within Dallas Township.

== History ==
Originally called "Dallas", Fowler was created when Robert Highman, Chief Engineer of the Detroit, Grand Haven, and Milwaukee Railroad, and E.A Wales acquired a tract of land along the railroad right-of-way in 1857. The Detroit, Grand Haven, and Milwaukee railroad completed the rail line though the area in July and August 1857. Dallas was later changed to Isabella and subsequently Fowler. A few years after the founding of Dallas, the town had little economic growth and was subsequently moved to a tract of land 1/10 of a mile west of the original tract, owned by John N. Fowler and in 1869 the name was changed to "Fowler". The village was originally settled in a swampy area and the move was driven by the lack of economic growth. In 1885, the town was incorporated as a village in Clinton County, reportedly during a high growth lumber boom.

In 1905, massive flooding in the area washed out a culvert three and a half miles west of town. A Grand Trunk work train was sent to repair the culvert but plunged into the creek, killing five men.

Fowler remains a small rural community, serving the needs of the local farming community and as a satellite community to Lansing.

== Geography ==
According to the United States Census Bureau, the village has a total area of 1.35 square miles (3.50 km^{2}), of which 1.32 square miles (3.42 km^{2}) is land and 0.03 square miles (0.08 km^{2}) (2.22%) is water.

The village is located within Dallas Township on M-21 about 10 miles (16 km) west of St. Johns and about 50 miles (80 km) east of Grand Rapids. It is about 20 miles (32 km) north of I-96 via county roads. The village is served by the 48835 ZIP Code.

== Demographics ==
Historical population
Census	Pop.	Note	%±
1880	321		—
1890	346		7.8%
1900	426		23.1%
1910	476		11.7%
1920	472		−0.8%
1930	561		18.9%
1940	579		3.2%
1950	675		16.6%
1960	854		26.5%
1970	1,020		19.4%
1980	1,021		0.1%
1990	912		−10.7%
2000	1,136		24.6%
2010	1,208		6.3%
2020	1,226		1.5%
U.S. Decennial Census

=== 2010 census ===
As of the census of 2010, there were 1,208 people, 451 households, and 319 families living in the village. The population density was 915.2 inhabitants per square mile (353.4/km^{2}). There were 488 housing units at an average density of 369.7 per square mile (142.7/km^{2}). The racial makeup of the village was 98.1% White, 0.4% African American, 0.7% Asian, 0.2% from other races, and 0.6% from two or more races. Hispanic or Latino of any race were 2.5% of the population.

There were 451 households, of which 34.1% had children under the age of 18 living with them, 60.3% were married couples living together, 7.1% had a female householder with no husband present, 3.3% had a male householder with no wife present, and 29.3% were non-families. 24.2% of all households were made up of individuals, and 12.9% had someone living alone who was 65 years of age or older. The average household size was 2.68 and the average family size was 3.24.

The median age in the village was 36.1 years. 29.7% of residents were under the age of 18; 7.4% were between the ages of 18 and 24; 25.5% were from 25 to 44; 20% were from 45 to 64; and 17.3% were 65 years of age or older. The gender makeup of the village was 50.7% male and 49.3% female.

=== 2000 census ===
As of the census of 2000, there were 1,136 people, 428 households, and 306 families living in the village. The population density was 877.0 inhabitants per square mile (338.6/km^{2}). There were 446 housing units at an average density of 344.3 per square mile (132.9/km^{2}). The racial makeup of the village was 100% White

There were 428 households, out of which 35.5% had children under the age of 18 living with them, 62.1% were married couples living together, 7.0% had a female householder with no husband present, and 28.3% were non-families. 23.8% of all households were made up of individuals, and 11.2% had someone living alone who was 65 years of age or older. The average household size was 2.64 and the average family size was 3.19.

In the village, the population was spread out, with 27.9% under the age of 18, 9.9% from 18 to 24, 28.9% from 25 to 44, 17.7% from 45 to 64, and 15.7% who were 65 years of age or older. The median age was 33 years. For every 100 females, there were 100.7 males. For every 100 females age 18 and over, there were 94.5 males.

The median income for a household in the village was $42,171, and the median income for a family was $56,625. Males had a median income of $40,134 versus $25,804 for females. The per capita income for the village was $18,123. About 2.7% of families and 4.0% of the population were below the poverty line, including 2.2% of those under age 18 and 6.7% of those age 65 or over.

== Notable people ==
- Slicker Parks, baseball pitcher for University of Michigan and Detroit Tigers
- Todd Simon, head coach of Bowling Green State University men's basketball team
- Clem Sohn, daredevil, aviation pioneer
