= 2024 in Michigan =

- Decades: 2000s; 2010s; 2020s
- See also: History of Michigan; Historical outline of Michigan; List of years in Michigan; 2024 in the United States

This article reviews 2023 in Michigan, including the state's office holders, performance of sports teams, a chronology of the state's top news and sports stories, and a list of notable Michigan-related deaths.

== Top stories ==
The top news stories in Michigan included: the 2024 Rochester Hills shooting; the trial and conviction of James and Jennifer Crumbley (parents of the shooter in the Oxford High School shooting); a May 7 EF2 tornado damaged 800 buildings in Portage; the trial in the killing of Samantha Woll; Elissa Slotkin's victory over Mike Rogers by a narrow margin in the 2024 United States Senate election in Michigan; the release of Novi resident Paul Whelan after six years in Russian custody on espionage charges; and the renovation and grand reopening of Michigan Central Station.

Top sports stories included: the Detroit Lions NFC North championship; the Detroit Tigers' first winning season since 2016; Tarik Skubal's pitching triple crown and receipt of the AL Cy Young Award; the 2024 Ferris State Bulldogs football team winning the Division II national championship; Flint boxer Claressa Shields winning WBC, WBF, and WBO titles in a July 27 match in Detroit; and the holding of the 2024 NFL draft in Detroit.

Notable Michigan-related deaths in 2024 included Four Tops co-founder Duke Fakir; actor and Michigan native James Earl Jones; poet and civil rights activist John Sinclair; Detroit bishop Thomas Gumbleton; former Detroit Lions players Joe Schmidt, Greg Landry, and Jim Ninowski; former Detroit Tigers players Rocky Colavito, Charlie Maxwell, and Ozzie Virgil Jr.; former Detroit Red Wings player Marty Pavelich; and basketball player Earl Cureton.

== Office holders ==
=== State government ===
- Governor: Gretchen Whitmer (D)
- Lieutenant Governor of Michigan: Garlin Gilchrist (D)
- Michigan Attorney General: Dana Nessel (D)
- Michigan Secretary of State: Jocelyn Benson (D)
- Speaker of the Michigan House of Representatives: Joe Tate (D)
- Majority Leader of the Michigan Senate: Winnie Brinks (R)
- Chief Justice, Michigan Supreme Court: Kyra Harris Bolden (D)

=== Mayors of major cities ===
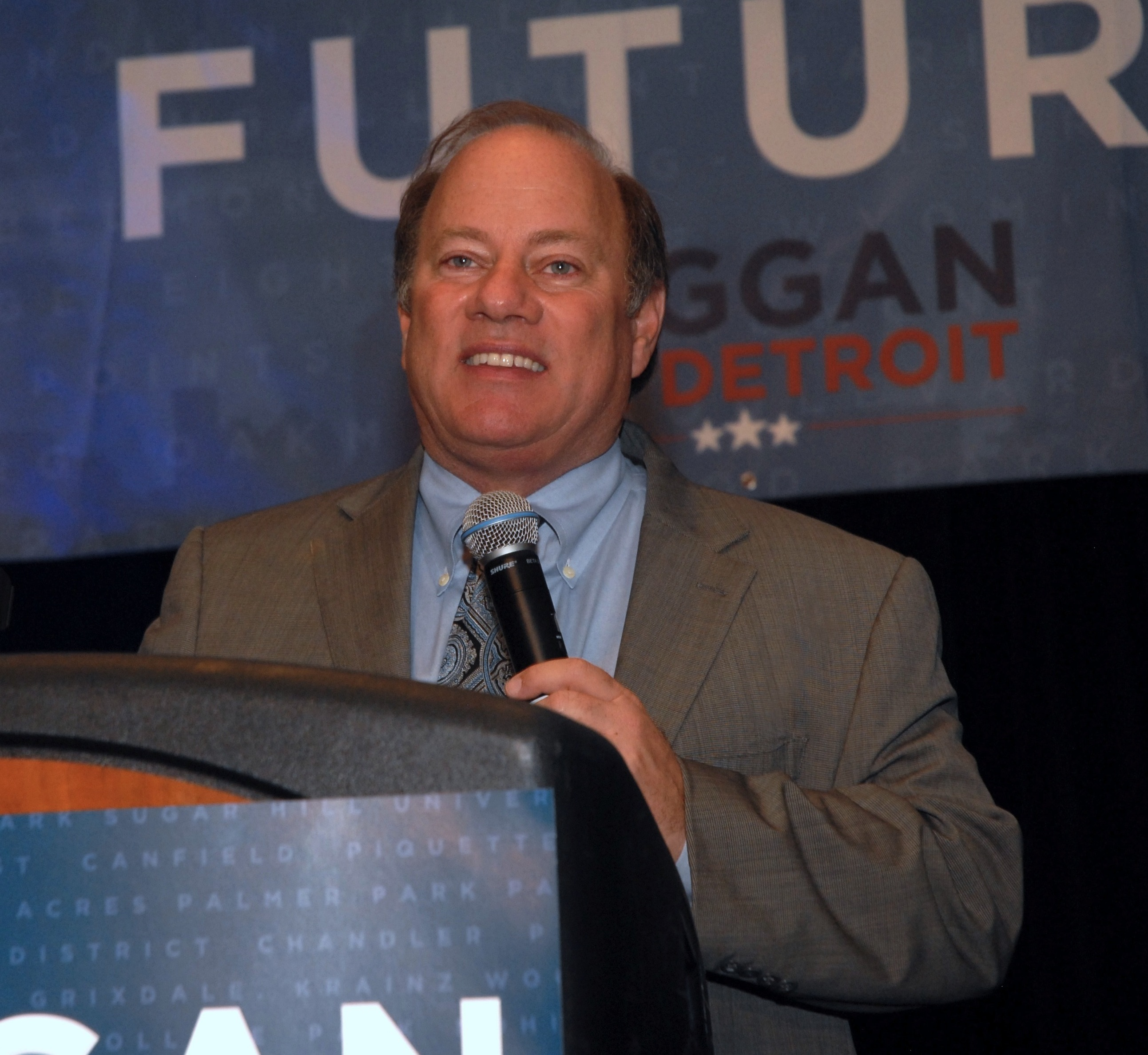
Mike Duggan

- Mayor of Detroit: Mike Duggan (Democrat)
- Mayor of Warren, Michigan: Lori Stone
- Mayor of Grand Rapids: Rosalynn Bliss
- Mayor of Sterling Heights, Michigan: Michael C. Taylor
- Mayor of Ann Arbor: Christopher Taylor (Democrat)
- Mayor of Dearborn: Abdullah Hammoud
- Mayor of Lansing: Andy Schor (Democrat)
- Mayor of Flint: Sheldon Neeley
- Mayor of Saginaw: Brenda Moore

=== Federal office holders ===
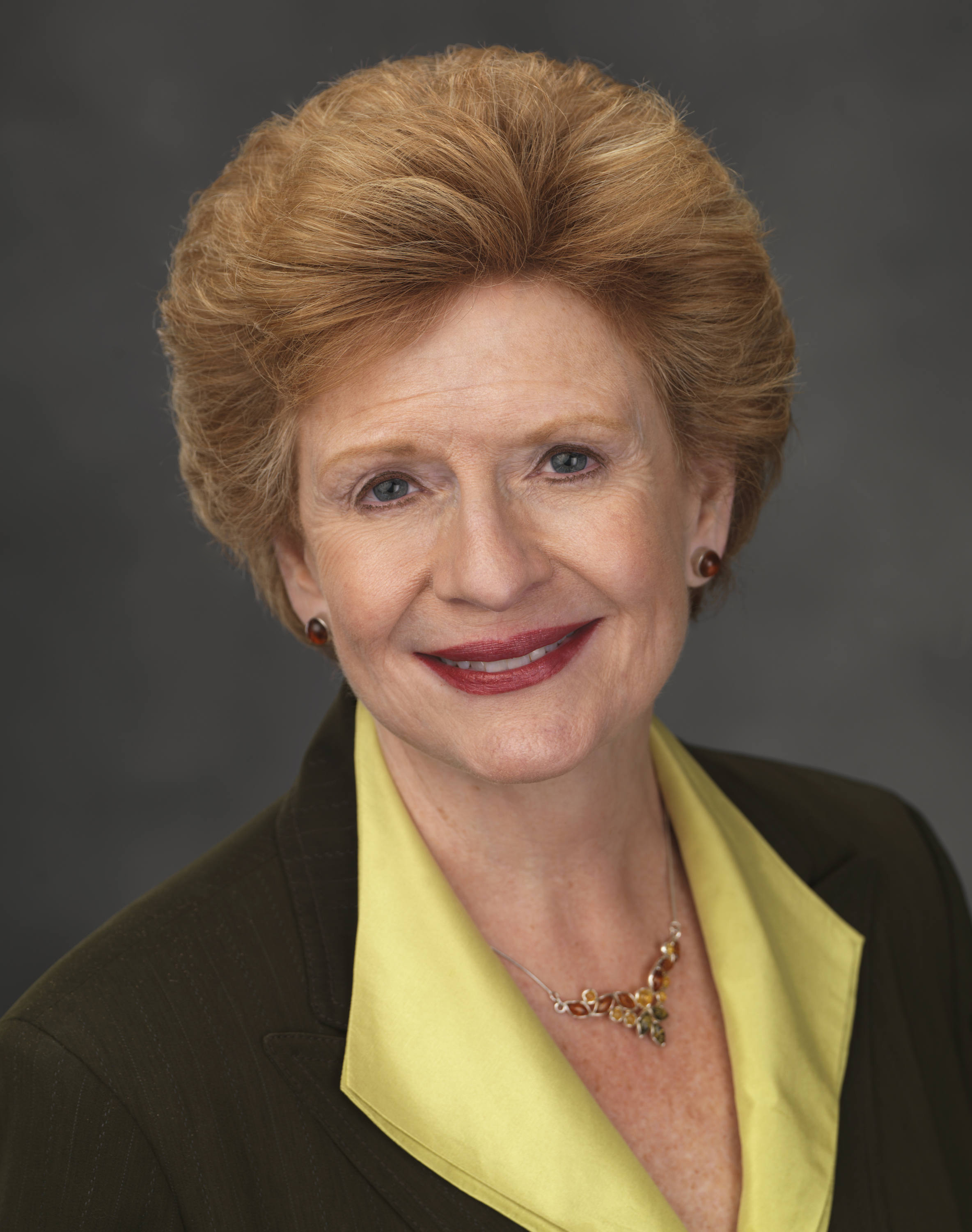
Debbie Stabenow

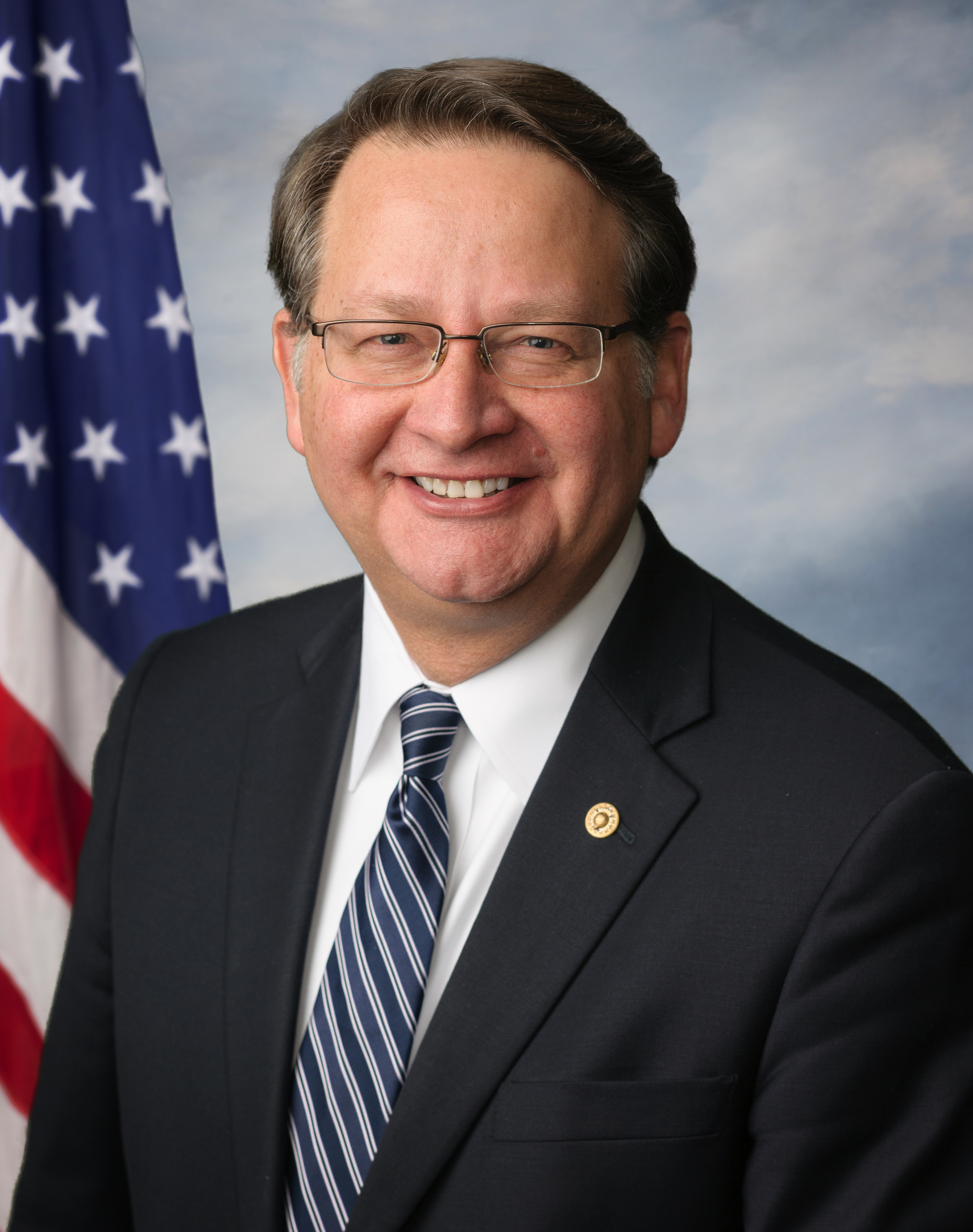
Gary Peters

- U.S. Senator from Michigan: Debbie Stabenow (Democrat)
- U.S. Senator from Michigan: Gary Peters (Democrat)
- House District 1: Jack Bergman (Republican)
- House District 2: John Moolenaar (Republican)
- House District 3: Hillary Scholten (Democrat)
- House District 4: Bill Huizenga (Republican)
- House District 5: Tim Walberg (Republican)
- House District 6: Debbie Dingell (Democrat)
- House District 7: Tom Barrett (Republican)
- House District 8: Kristen McDonald Rivet (Democrat)
- House District 9: Lisa McClain (Democrat)
- House District 10: John James (Republican)
- House District 11: Haley Stevens (Democrat)
- House District 12: Rashida Tlaib (Democrat)
- House District 13: Shri Thanedar (Democrat)

== Sports ==
=== Baseball ===
- 2024 Detroit Tigers season - Led by head coach A. J. Hinch, the Tigers compiled a 86–76 record and finished third in the AL Central. They defeated Houston in the 2024 American League Wild Card Series and lost to Cleveland in the 2024 American League Division Series. Tarik Skubal won the pitching triple crown and Cy Young Award. Left fielder Riley Greene led the team with 24 home runs and 74 RBIs.
- 2024 Michigan Wolverines baseball team - The team compiled a 32–28 record and was the champion of the Big Ten tournament. The team's statistical leaders included Stephen Hrustich (.300 batting average, 15 home runs) and Jacob Denner (nine wins, 70 strikeouts).
- 2024 Michigan Wolverines softball team - The team compiled a 43–18 record, won the 2024 Big Ten softball tournament, and advanced to the 2024 NCAA Division I softball tournament.

=== American football ===
- 2024 Detroit Lions season - Led by head coach Lions Dan Campbell, the Lions compiled a 15-2 record, losing to the Washington Commanders in the divisional playoffs. Statistical leaders included Jared Goff (4,629 passing yards), Jahmyr Gibbs (1,412 rushing yards), Amon-Ra St. Brown (1,263 receiving yards), and Jake Bates (142 points scored).
- 2024 Michigan Panthers season - The team compiled a 7–3 record and finished in second place in the USFL Conference.
- 2024 Michigan Wolverines football team - In their first year under head coach Sherrone Moore, the Wolverines compiled an 8–5 record. They concluded the season with victories over No. 2 Ohio State and No. 11 Alabama. Defensive tackle Mason Graham and kicker Dominic Zvada won first-team All-America honors.
- 2024 Michigan State Spartans football team - In their first year under head coach Jonathan Smith, the Spartans compiled a 5–7 record.
- 2024 Ferris State Bulldogs football team - In their 13th year under head coach Tony Annese, the Bulldogs compiled a 14–1 record and won the NCAA Division II national championship. The team was led on offense by quarterback Trinidad Chambliss who entered the transfer portal after the season and committed to Ole Miss.

=== Basketball ===
- 2023–24 Detroit Pistons season - In their first and only season under head coach Monty Williams, the Pistons compiled the worst overall record in the NBA for the second consecutive season and the worst in franchise history at 14–68.
- 2023–24 Michigan State Spartans men's basketball team - In their 29th season under head coach Tom Izzo, the Spartans compiled a 20–15 record.
- 2023–24 Michigan Wolverines men's basketball team - In their fifth and final season under head coach Juwan Howard, the Wolverines compiled an 8–24 record.

=== Ice hockey ===
- 2023–24 Detroit Red Wings season - In their second season under head coach Derek Lalonde, the Red Wings compiled a 41–32–9 record, their first non-losing season since 2015-16.
- 2023–24 Michigan Wolverines men's ice hockey season - 23–15–3
- 2023–24 Michigan State Spartans men's ice hockey season - 25–10–3, Big 10 Tournament champion
- 2023–24 Western Michigan Broncos men's ice hockey season - 21–16–1

=== Auto racing ===
- 2024 Chevrolet Detroit Grand Prix - IndyCar race in Detroit on June 2. Scott Dixon of Chip Ganassi Racing was the winner.
- 2024 Chevrolet Detroit Sports Car Classic - sports car race in Detroit on June 1.
- 2024 Dutch Boy 150 - automobile race at Flat Rock Speedway on May 18. Connor Zilisch of Pinnacle Racing Group was the winner.
- 2024 FireKeepers Casino 400 - NASCAR race at Michigan International Speedway on August 18-19. Tyler Reddick of 23XI Racing was the winner.
- 2024 Henry Ford Health 200 - stock car race at Michigan International Speedway. Connor Zilisch of Pinnacle Racing Group was the winner.

=== Other sports ===
- Flint boxer Claressa Shields defeated Vanessa Lepage-Joanisse on July 27 at Little Caesars Arena in Detroit. With the victory, she won the WBC, WBF, and WBO titles.
- 2024 Cranbrook Tennis Classic - professional tennis tournament in Bloomfield Hills. Learner Tien won the men's championship.
- 2024 Dow Tennis Classic - professional women's tennis tournament in Midland. Rebecca Marino won the singles championship.
- 2024 Detroit City FC season

== Chronology ==
=== January ===
- January 1 – The 2024 Michigan Wolverines football team defeated Alabama, 27–20, in the 2024 Rose Bowl game. It was the last college football game for Nick Saban.
- January 8 – Michigan defeated the Washington Huskies, 34–13, in the 2024 College Football Playoff National Championship game. Blake Corum rushed for 134 yards and two touchdowns and was selected as the offensive most valuable player.
- January - Flu, COVID-19, and RSV cases soar across Michigan, filling emergency rooms.
- January 21 - Detroit Lions defeated Tampa Bay Buccaneers, 31-23, at Ford Field.
- January 24 - Jim Harbaugh announced he was leaving Michigan to become head coach of the San Diego Chargers.
- January 28 - The Detroit Lions lost, 34-31, to the San Francisco 49ers in the NFC Championship Game.
- January 30 - General Motors announced $12,500 profit-sharing payouts for its workers.

=== February ===
- February 4 - The Detroit Institute of Arts opened its exhibit on black cinema.
- February 6 - Following a trial, an Oakland County jury found Jennifer Crumbley guilty of involuntary manslaughter, finding her criminaly responsible for her son's killings in the Oxford High School shooting.
- February 8 - Northville Downs, Michigan's last horse racing track, closed.
- February 27 –

- 2024 Michigan Republican presidential primary - Donald Trump won with 761,163 votes (68.12%), defeating Nikki Haley who received 297,124 votes (26.59%).
- 2024 Michigan Democratic presidential primary: Joe Biden won with 625,221 votes (81.1%) with "uncommitted" receiving 101,623 votes (13.2%).

=== March ===
- March 2 – Former president Donald Trump won all 39 delegates awarded at 13 separate Republican caucuses held in Grand Rapids.
- March 13 - U.S. District Judge David Lawson found the city of Flint in contempt of court for faiing to meet court-ordered mandates for replacing lead water lines.
- March 14 - After trial, an Oakland County jury found James Crumbley, the father of the shooter in the 2021 Oxford High School shooting, guilty of four counts of involuntary manslaughter. His wife was convicted in February. They were the first parents in American history to be held criminally responsiblle for a mass shooting carried out by their child.
- March 15 - The University of Michigan fired head basketball coach Juwan Howard.
- March 16 - The Detroit Free Press reported on promises of non-prosecution of school officials in exchange for their testimony against the Crumbleys.
- March 22 - Killing of Ruby Garcia - A 25-year old Michigan woman was killed by her boyfriend, an undocumented alien from Mexico. Presidential candidate Donald Trump pointed to the case as an example of "migrant crime" and claimed to have spoken to Ruby's family and learned about her contagious laughter and ability to light up a room. The family denied ever speaking to Trump.
- March 24 - Michigan hired Dusty May as its new basketball coach.

=== April ===
- April 8 - The total solar eclipse was visible in Luna Pier.
- April 9 - James and Jennifer Crumbley were both sentenced to 10-15 years in prison in connection with the Oxford High School shooting.
- April 16 - A special election is held for two districts of the Michigan House of Representatives, in which two Democrats win seats.
- April 25-27 – The first round of the 2024 NFL draft was held at Campus Martius and Hart Plaza in downtown Detroit. The draft set an attendance record, drawing over 775,000 persons from Thursday to Saturday.

=== May ===
- May 7 – Tornado outbreak of May 6–10, 2024: An EF2 tornado struck Portage, damaging 800 buildings including the collapse of a FedEx warehouse.
- May 12 - A Shelby Township doctor, Lawrence Sherman, was sentenced to 12 years in federal prison after being convicted of unlawfully prescribing more than 270,000 opioid pills with a street value of over $6.3 million.
- May 13 - The Detroit Lions signed quarterback Jared Goff to a new contract reported to pay approximately $53 million per year.
- May 15 - The U.S. Census Bureau reported that Detroit's population grew from 631,366 in 2022 to 633,218 in 2023. It was the first time since 1957 that Detroit had an increase in population.
- May 27 – A 17-year-old Kylete Owens was killed, and six others were injured, two critically, in a late night (2:50 a.m.) incident as shots were fired indiscriminately by multiple shooters into a crowd of 50-100 young people between Rotary Park and the business district in Lansing. The victims ranged from 15 to 20 years old. Police attributed the incident to a feud between two groups.
- May 30 –
  - In the early morning hours, Wayne State University police, backed up by Detroit police, cleared and closed a tent encampment at Wayne State University, protesting against Israel's conduct in Gaza. Five demonstrators were arrested. Rashida Tlaib visited the site and accused police of pulling the hijab off a student. Approximately 100 protesters gathered at the jail where the five were held, remaining until they were released in the late afternoon. A similar tent encampment at the University of Michigan in Ann Arbor was shut down on May 21.
  - The Michigan Department of Health reported a Michigan dairy worker had been diagnosed with H5N1 bird flu. It was the third human case of the disease in the United States.

=== June ===
- June 6-15 - Ford Motor Co. hosted a 10-day grand opening for Michigan Central Station in Detroit. Ford reopened the building after a six-year renovation. The ceremonies included a concert featuring Detroit stars Diana Ross, Jack White, Big Sean and Eminem. The renovation also triggered a boom in the surrounding Corktown neighborhood.
- June 6 – A EF1 tornado touched down at 3:30 p.m. in Livonia, killing a two-year-old and putting his mother in the hospital. The tornado also collapsed a gas station canopy in Farmington Hills and left thousands without electricity.
- June 14 - Construction from the American and Canadian sides met in the middle as the two sides of the bridge deck were linked on the Gordie Howe International Bridge in Detroit.
- June 15 – 2024 Rochester Hills shooting: A gunman fired 36 shots from a semiautomatic handgun, reloading several times, at a splash pad in Rochester Hills. Nine people, including two young children, were injured. The shooter was an unemployed 42-year-old with a history of mental illness. He drove off after the shooting, then killed himself following a standoff with police at his mother's house.
- June 19 - Monty Williams fired as head coach of the Detroit Pistons after the team finished with the worst record in franchise history.
- June 25 - Former Detroit Red Wings star Pavel Datsyuk selected for Hockey Hall of Fame.

=== July ===
- July 7 - Two people were killed (a 20-year-old woman and a 21-year-old man) and 19 others injured in a shooting in the early morning hours at a block party on Detroit's east side. It was the worst shooting in Michigan since 2013.
- July 10 - President Biden awards $650 million for Michigan plants to help more electric vehicles.
- July 18 - Following trial, a Wayne County jury acquitted Michael Jackson-Bolanso of murdeer in the Killing of Samantha Woll, a Detroit synagogue leader and policitcal activist who was stabbed to death in 2023. The jury deadlocked on charges of felony murder and home invasion and found him guilty of lying to police about his role in the death.
- July 20 - In his first rally after the assassination attempt in Butler, Pennsylvania, Trump appeared with JD Vance at Van Andel Arena in Grand Rapids

=== August ===
- August 1 - Michigander Paul Whelan was freed from Russian custody and began his journey home. Whelan was arrested in 2018 and charged with espionage. He had been a resident of Novi and was the head of global security for BorgWarner.
- August 6

- Elissa Slotkin won the Democratic primary for U.S. Senate with 712,791 votes (76.33%), defeating Hill Harper who received 221,053 votes (23.67%).
- Mike Rogers won the Republican primary for U.S. Senate with 555,766 votes (63.1%), defeating Justin Amash with 137,575 votes (15.64%) and Sherry O'Donnell with 106,466 votes (12.10%).

=== September ===
- September 26 - Former CFO of the Detroit Riverfront Conservancy William Smith, age 51, was arraigned on charges of wire fraud and money laundering for siphoning millions of dollar from the organization. The indictment was preceded by a June 24 court order freezing the Conservancy's assets.
- September 27 - With a victory over the Chicago White Sox, the Detroit Tigers clinched their first postseason appearance since 2014.

=== October ===
- October 2 - The Detroit Tigers defeated the Houston Astros in the final game of the American League Wild Card Series.
- October 12 - The Tigers lost Game 7 of the American League Divisional Series against the Cleveland Guardians.

=== November ===
- November 5

- 2024 United States Senate election in Michigan: Elissa Slotkin defeated Mike Rogers by a narrow margin of 2,712,686 (48.64%) to 2,693,680 (48.30%).
- 2024 United States presidential election in Michigan; Donald Trump defeated Kamala Harris by a margin of 2,816,636 (49.73% to 2,736,533 (48.31%).
- 2024 United States House of Representatives elections in Michigan: In the elections for Michigan's 13 House seats, Republicans won seven seats, and the Democrats won six seats.

- November 13 - Detroit Mayor Mike Duggan announced he would not run for another term as mayor.
- November 15 - William Smith, ex-CFO of Detroit Riverfront Conservancy pleaded guilty to wire fraud and money laundering and agreed to repay at least $44.3 million in restitution for his theft.
- November 21 - Bryce Underwood, the No. 1 college football recruit in the country, flipped his commitment from LSU to Michigan.
- November 30 - Unranked Michigan upset No. 2 Ohio State, 13–10, in Columbus.
- November 30 - General Motors and Dan Gilbert said that they were considering demolition of the Renaissance Center if public funding was not made available to revamp the buildings.

=== December ===
- December 1 - Stellantis CEO Carlos Tavares resigned.
- December 26 - Derek Lalonde fired as the Detroit Red Wings coach.
- December 31 - Michigan defeated Alabama in the ReliaQuest Bowl.

== Deaths ==
- January 10 - Jennell Jaquays, video game designer, in Texas
- February 4 - Earl Cureton, basketball player, in Detroit
- February 7 - Henry Fambrough, last surviving member of The Spinners, in Virginia
- February 16 - Etterlene DeBarge, gospel singer and matriarch of the vocal group DeBarge, in California
- February 23 – Paul Muxlow, Michigan state representative (2011-2016)
- February 24 – Eric Mays, Flint city council member (since 2013)
- March 27 – James R. McNutt, Michigan state representative (1991-1998)
- March 28 – Mike Green, Michigan state senator (2011-2019) and state representative (1995-2000)
- April 2 - John Sinclair, poet and political activist, in Detroit
- April 4 - Thomas Gumbleton, Catholic bishop, in Detroit
- May 2 - Darius Morris, Michigan point guard (2009-2011), in California at age 33
- May 3 – Obi Ezeh, Michigan Wolverines linebacker
- May 8 – Thomas M. Holcomb, Michigan state representative (1975-179)
- May 9 - Dennis Thompson, drummer for MC5, in Taylor
- May 9 – Jon Urbanchek, Michigan and Olympic swim coach
- May 20 - Ivan Boesky, stock trader and Michigan native, in La Jolla, California
- June 9 - Lynn Conway, computer scientist and transgender rights activist, in Jackson
- June 12 - Mike Downey, former sports columnist for Detroit Free Press, in California
- June 21 – George A. McManus Jr., Michigan state representative (1991-2002)
- June 28 - Marty Pavelich, Detroit Red Wings left wing (1947-57), in Montana
- July 11 – Tim Sneller, Michigan state representative (2017-2022)
- July 22 - Duke Fakir, singer and co-founder of the Four Tops, in Detroit
- July 23 - Jim Ninowski, quarterback for Detroit Pershing, Michigan State, and Detroit Lions, in Sterling Heights
- July 29 - Don Wert, Detroit Tigers 3B (1963-71), in Pennsylvania
- August 21 – James Duderstadt, president of the University of Michigan (1988-1996)
- August 27 - Bob Carr, US Congress (1983-95), in Washington, D.C.
- September 9 - James Earl Jones, actor raised in Michigan and a University of Michigan alumnus, in Pawling, New York
- September 11 - Joe Schmidt, Detroit Lions linebacker (1953–1965) and head coach (1967–1972), in Florida
- September 23 - David Curson, Congressman representing Michigan's 11th District
- September 29 - Ozzie Virgil Sr., first African-American player for Detroit Tigers, in San Francisco
- October 4 - Greg Landry, Detroit Lions QB (1968–1978), in Detroit
- October 4 - Christopher Ciccone, artist and brother of Madonna, in Petoskey, Michigan
- October 8 – Edward Vaughn, Michigan state representative (1979-1980, 1995-2000)
- October 20 - Barbara Dane, folk singer raised in Detroit, in California
- November 8 - George Bohanon, jazz trombonist and session musician
- December 7 - Merv Rettenmund, baseball player born and raised in Flint, in San Diego
- December 10 - Rocky Colavito, Detroit Tigers outfielder (1960–1963), in Pennsylvania
- December 27 - Charlie Maxwell, MLB outfielder (1950-64), in Paw Paw
- December 30 – James E. McBryde, Michigan state representative (1991-1998)

== See also ==
- 2024 in the United States
