= 2025 in Michigan =

- Decades: 2000s; 2010s; 2020s
- See also: History of Michigan; Historical outline of Michigan; List of years in Michigan; 2025 in the United States

This article reviews 2025 in Michigan, including the state's office holders, performance of its sports teams and athletes, a chronology of the state's top news and sports stories, and a list of notable Michigan-related deaths.

== Top stories ==
The top news stories in Michigan included: the September 2025 Grand Blanc church attack; the impact of tariffs in the second Trump administration on the automobile industry and Michigan economy; the 2025 Traverse City stabbing attack; criminal charges against former Gov. Rick Snyder and others in connection with the Flint water crisis; the dismissal of criminal charges against 15 Republican officials in the Michigan prosecution of fake electors; the trial of police officer Christopher Schurr in connection with the 2022 killing of Patrick Lyoya; and the November 4 election of Mary Sheffield as the first woman to serve as Mayor of Detroit.

The top sports stories in Michigan during 2025 included: the Detroit Tigers' advance to the playoffs and Tarik Skubal winning his second consecutive Cy Young Award; the Detroit Lions' losing six of nine games in November and December to fall out of playoff contention; the Detroit Pistons advancing to the playoffs but losing in the first round; the Detroit Red Wings finishing with a losing record and failing to qualify for the playoffs for the ninth consecutive year; the Sherrone Moore firing and scandal, including his arrest and detention on charges of home invasion, stalking, and breaking and entering; Ferris State football winning its fourth national championship since 2021; and Western Michigan men's ice hockey winning the NCAA Frozen Four.

Notable cultural events in Michigan during 2025 included the induction of The White Stripes into the Rock and Roll Hall of Fame and the release of the documentary film Stans focusing on Eminem and his fans.

Notable Michigan-related deaths in 2025 included former members of Congress Lucien Nedzi and Carolyn Cheeks Kilpatrick; Apollo astronaut Jim Lovell; former Detroit Red Wings players Ted Lindsay and Alex Delvecchio; and former Detroit Tigers players Chet Lemon and Joe Coleman.

== Office holders ==
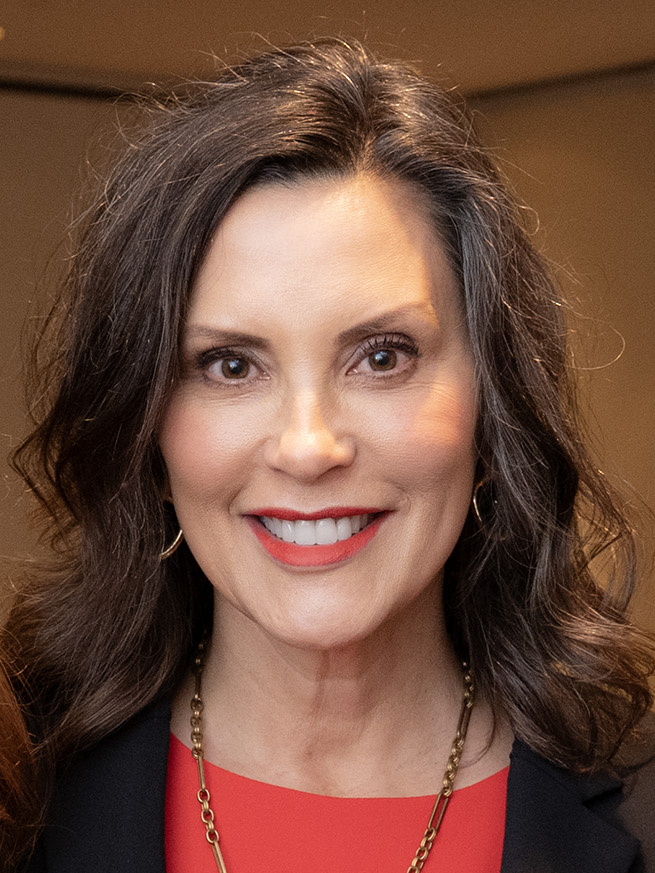
Gretchen Whitmer

=== State government ===
- Governor: Gretchen Whitmer (D)
- Lieutenant Governor: Garlin Gilchrist (D)
- Attorney General: Dana Nessel (D)
- Secretary of State: Jocelyn Benson (D)
- Speaker of the House of Representatives: Matt Hall (R)
- Majority Leader of the Senate: Winnie Brinks (R)
- Chief Justice, Supreme Court: Kyra Harris Bolden (D)

=== Mayors of major cities ===
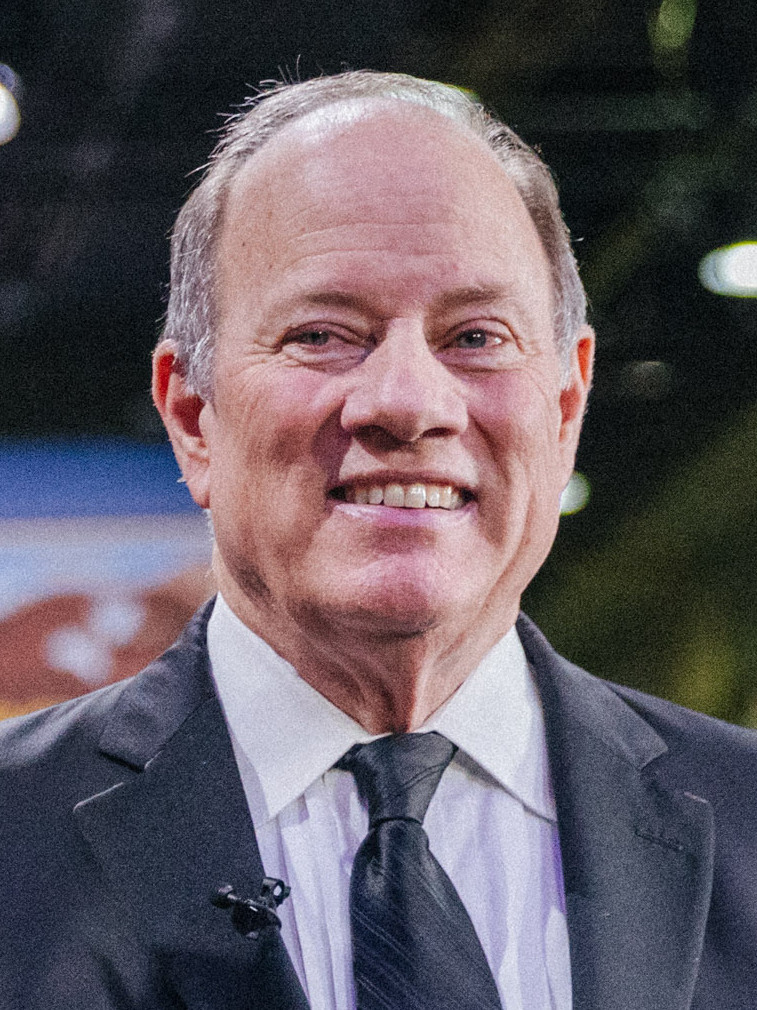
Mike Duggan

- Mayor of Detroit: Mike Duggan (D)
- Mayor of Warren: Lori Stone
- Mayor of Grand Rapids: David LaGrand
- Mayor of Sterling Heights: Michael C. Taylor
- Mayor of Ann Arbor: Christopher Taylor (D)
- Mayor of Dearborn: Abdullah Hammoud
- Mayor of Lansing: Andy Schor (D)
- Mayor of Flint: Sheldon Neeley
- Mayor of Saginaw: Brenda Moore

=== Federal office holders ===
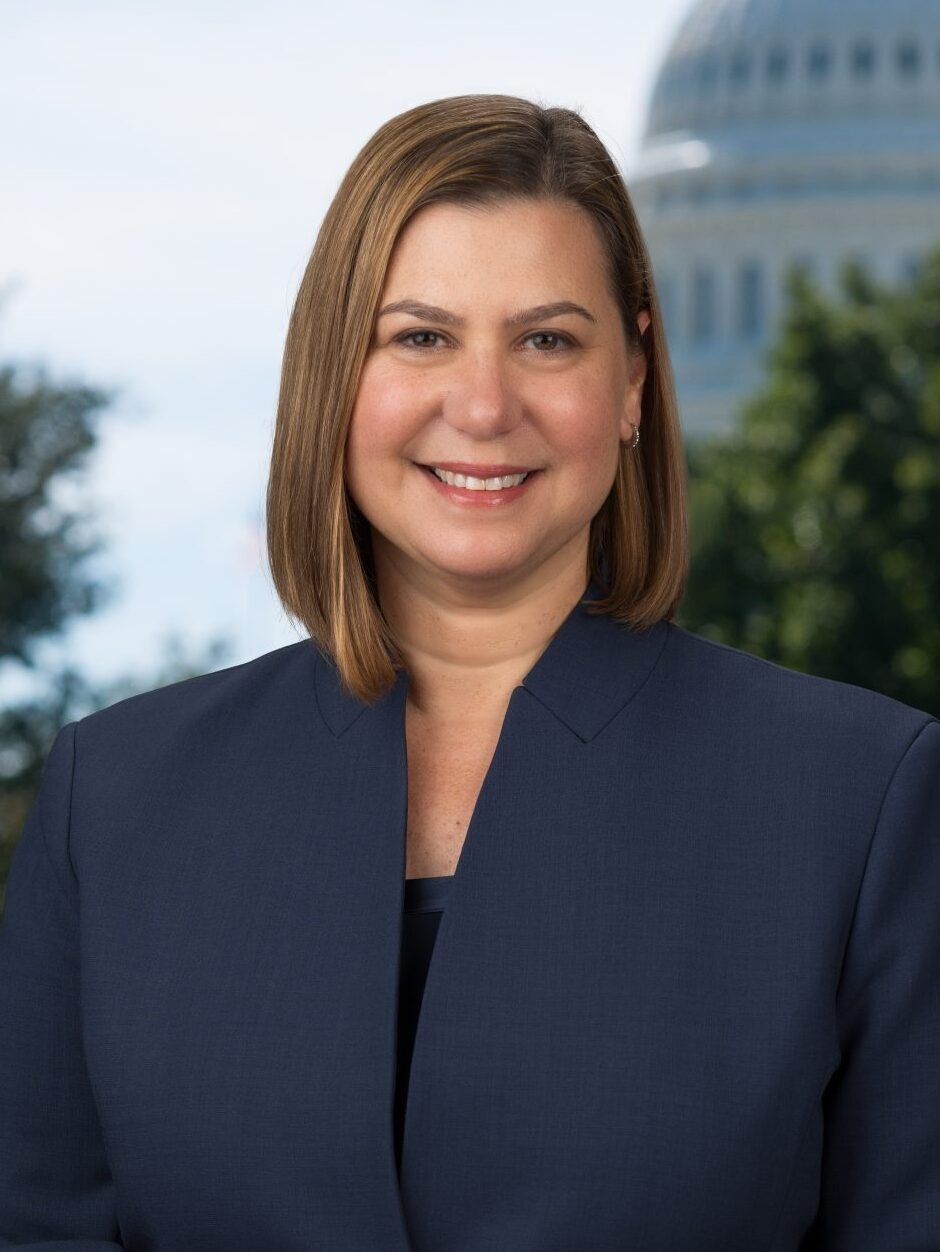
Elissa Slotkin

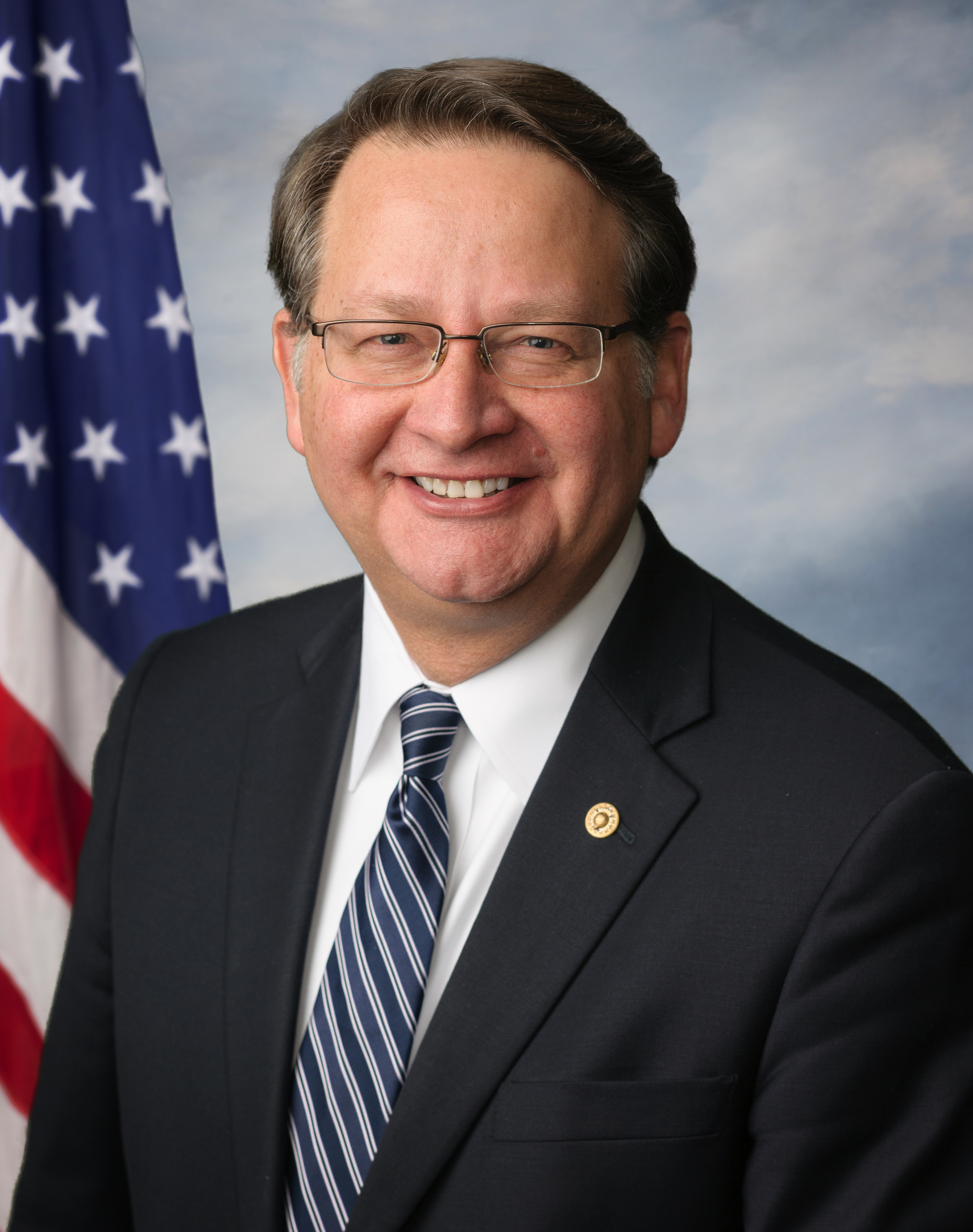
Gary Peters

- U.S. Senator: Elissa Slotkin (D)
- U.S. Senator: Gary Peters (D)
- House District 1: Jack Bergman (R)
- House District 2: John Moolenaar (R)
- House District 3: Hillary Scholten (D)
- House District 4: Bill Huizenga (R)
- House District 5: Tim Walberg (R)
- House District 6: Debbie Dingell (D)
- House District 7: Tom Barrett (R)
- House District 8: Kristen McDonald Rivet (D)
- House District 9: Lisa McClain (D)
- House District 10: John James (R)
- House District 11: Haley Stevens (D)
- House District 12: Rashida Tlaib (D)
- House District 13: Shri Thanedar (D)

== Sports ==
=== Baseball ===
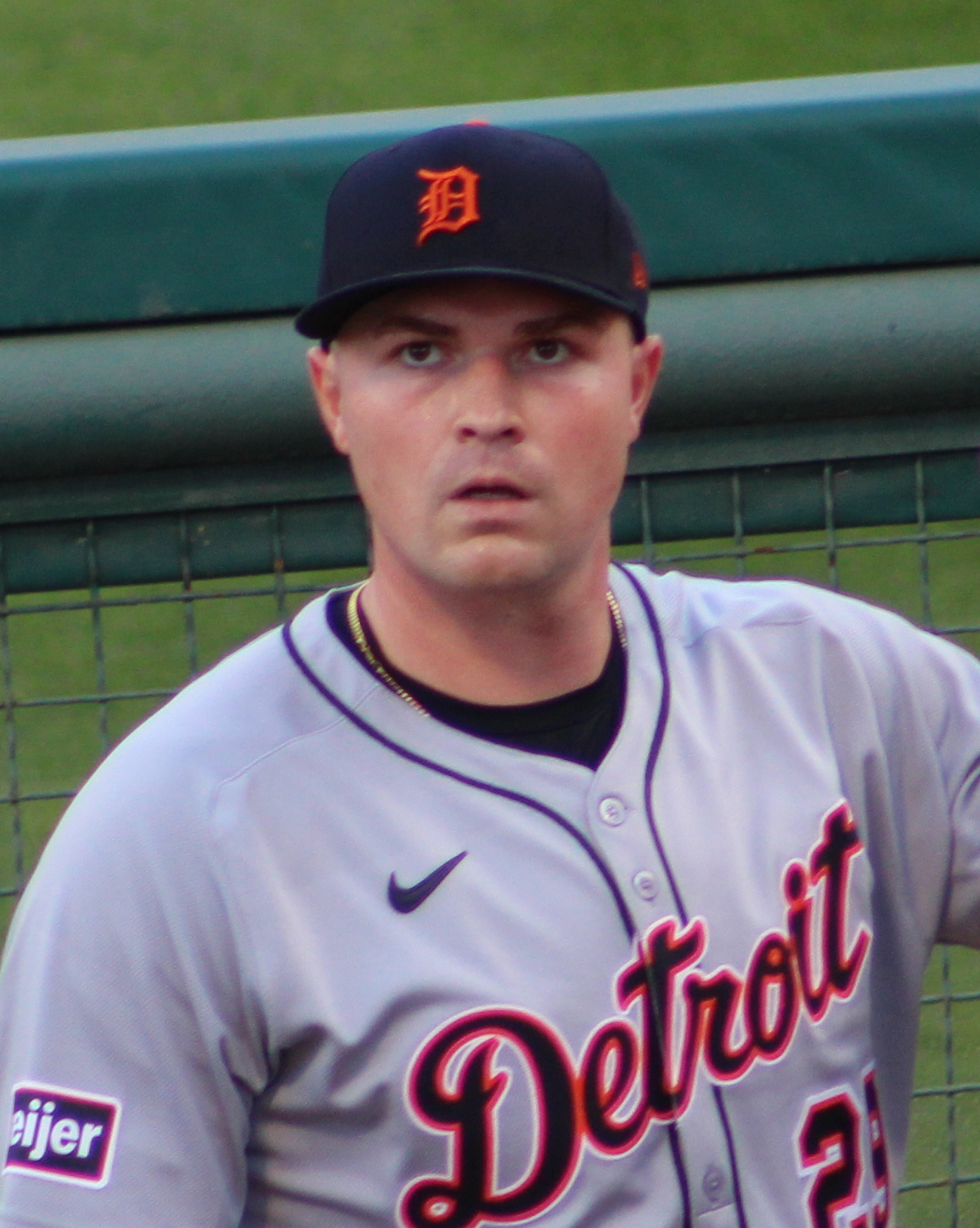
Tarik Skubal

- 2025 Detroit Tigers season - In their fifth season under manager A. J. Hinch, the Tigers compiled an 87–75 record and finished in second place in the AL Central. The defeated the Cleveland Guardians in the AL Wild Card Series but lost to the Seattle Mariners in the AL Division Series. The team's statistical leaders included left fielder Riley Greene (36 home run, 111 RBIs), catcher Dillon Dingler (.278 batting average, Gold Glove), and pitcher Tarik Skubal (241 strikeouts, 2.21 earned run average).

=== American football ===
- 2025 Detroit Lions season - Led by head coach Dan Campbell, the Lions began the season with a compiled a 6–3 record, but lost five of their final eight games for a final record of 9–8. The team's statistical leaders included Jared Goff (4,564 passing yards), Jahmyr Gibbs (1,223 rushing yards), and Amon-Ra St. Brown (117 receptions for 1,401 yards).
- 2025 Michigan Wolverines football team - In their second year under head coach Sherrone Moore, the team compiled a 9–4 record, including a loss to Texas in the Citrus Bowl, and were ranked No. 21 in the final AP poll. The team's statistical leaders included quarterback Bryce Underwood (2,428 passing yards), running back Jordan Marshall (932 rushing yards), and wide receiver Andrew Marsh (651 receiving yards).
- 2025 Michigan State Spartans football team - In their second and final season under head coach Jonathan Smith, the team compiled a 4–8 record and finished in 17th place in the Big Ten. The team's statistical leaders included Aidan Chiles (1,392 passing yards), Makhi Frazier (520 rushing yards), and Nick Marsh (59 receptions for 662 yards).

=== Basketball ===
- 2024–25 Detroit Pistons season - Led by head coach J. B. Bickerstaff, the team compiled a 44–38 record and finished in sixth place in the Eastern Conference. The team's statistical leaders included Cade Cunningham (1,830 points, 638 assists) and Jalen Duren (807 rebounds).
- 2024–25 Michigan State Spartans men's basketball team - In their 30th season under head coach Tom Izzo, the Spartans compiled a 30–7 record and were ranked No. 7. The team's statistical leaders included Jaden Akins with 474 points and Jaxon Kohler with 276 rebounds, and Jeremy Fears Jr. with 196 assists.
- 2024–25 Michigan Wolverines men's basketball team - In their first season under head coach Dusty May, the Wolverines compiled a 27–10 record and won the 2025 Big Ten men's basketball tournament. The team's statistical leaders included Vladislav Goldin with 615 points, Danny Wolf with 360 rebounds, and Tre Donaldson with 151 assists.

=== Ice hockey ===
- 2024–25 Detroit Red Wings season - Led by head coaches Derek Lalonde and Todd McLellan, the Red Wings compiled a 39–35–8 record and finished in sixth place in the NHL Atlantic Division. The team's statistical leaders included Alex DeBrincat (39 goals) and Lucas Raymond (53 assists and 80 points).
- 2024–25 Western Michigan Broncos men's ice hockey season - Led by head coach Pat Ferschweiler, the Broncos compiled a 34-7-1 record and won the NCAA national championship, defeating Denver University and Boston University in the 2025 NCAA Division I men's ice hockey tournament. The team's statistical leaders included Alex Bump (23 goals, 47 points) and Grant Slukynsky (26 assists).

== Chronology of events ==
=== January ===
- January 2 - Seven Detroit Lions players (Jared Goff, Jahmyr Gibbs, Amon-Ra St. Brown, Penei Sewell, Frank Ragnow, Brian Branch, and Jack Fox) were named to the Pro Bowl roster.
- January 3 - Final crime statistics for 2024 were released. Detroit reported 203 homicides, its lowest rate in more than 50 years.
- January 7 - Baker College of Owosso was fined $2.5 million by the US Department of Education for misrepresenting career outomes.
- January 13 - Lawyers for James and Jennifer Crumbley (parents and defendants in the Oxford High School shooting) filed documents with the court showing that the Oakland County Prosecutor's office paid two public relations firms at least $100,000 to run a "smear campaign" against them and signed a secret deal with ABC despite a court gag order.
- January 14 - Michigan Attorney General Dana Nessel announced new indictments against former Gov. Rick Snyder and eight others for their actions and neglect in connection with the Flint water crisis. The charges included obstruction of justice, extortion, and involuntary manslaughter.
- January 18 - The Detroit Lions lost to the Washington Commanders in the divisional wild card game.
- January 21 - Three Michiganders, Justin Jersey, Logan Barnhart and Matthew Krol, were among the individuals pardoned by Donald Trump for their role in the January 6 United States Capitol attack. They were convicted of, or pleaded guilty to, attacks on police officers.
- January 24 - Leaders of the Big Three automakers met with Donald Trump, defending their use of plants in Mexico.
- January 24 - Donald Trump pardoned four anti-abortion protesters who were convicted for preventing a woman whose health was a risk from entering a Sterling Heights clinic in 2000.
- January 26 - Detroit Mayor Mike Duggan announced that Detroit would cooperate with Trump's immigration enforcement and was not a sanctuary city.
- January 28 - General Motors announced record profit-sharing payouts to 45,000 hourly workers in the US.

=== February ===
- February 4 - General Motors discontinued its Cruise autonomous vehicle business. GM had spent billions on the business.
- February 10 – Two homeless children, 10-year-old Darnell Currie and 2-year-old A'millah Currie, die of carbon monoxide exposure while sleeping in an unheated van.
- February 23 - Gov. Gretchen Whitmer met with Pres. Donald Trump at the White House discuss impact of tariffs on automobile industry and proposal to close Selfridge Air National Guard Base.

=== March ===
- March 17 - Michigan won the Big 10 men's basketball tournament.
- March 20 - Former Michigan offensive coordinator Matt Weiss indicted on computer hacking charges.
- March 22 – Grand Valley State University defeated Cal State Dominguez Hills, 70–58, to win the 2025 NCAA Division II women's basketball tournament, earning its second title.
- March 24 - The bodies of two children were discovered in a freezer during an eviction at the Martin Luther King Apartment in Detroit.
- March 27 - The University of Michigan announced the closure of its DEI office amid pressure from President Trump.
- March 27 - UAW President Shawn Fain announced the union's approval of tariffs on foreign vehicles.

=== April ===
- April 2 - President Trump announced that 25% tariffs on imported cards, light-duty trucks, and parts would go into effect the next day.
- April 12 – The 2024–25 Western Michigan men's ice hockey team defeated Boston University, 6–2, to win the 2025 NCAA Division I men's ice hockey tournament, the school's first title.
- April 27 - The White Stripes were announced as part of the 2025 class of inductees into the Rock and Roll Hall of Fame.
- April 29 - President Trump announced scaled-back auto tariffs and the award of a new fighter jet mission to Selfridge Air National Guard base.

=== May ===
- May 1 - General Motors updated its forecast, taking a $5 billion hit for the anticipated impact of tariffs. Four days later, Ford projected a $1.5 billion hit due to tariffs.
- May 4 - Santa Ono resigned as president of the University of Michigan.
- May 8 – The murder trial of former Grand Rapids Police Officer Christopher Schurr in connection with the 2022 Killing of Patrick Lyoya resulted in a hung jury. The judge declared a mistrial. (Schurr shot Lyoya, a 26-year-old African immigrant, in the back of his head during a scuffle following a traffic stop.) On May 22, the prosecutor announced he would not retry Schurr.
- May 10 - The Detroit Opera's production of "The Central Park Five" debuted at the Detroit Opera House.

=== June ===
- June - Antonio Filosa selected as new CEO of Stellantis.
- June 16 - The Detroit News and Detroit Free Press announced that their joint operating agreement would end at the end of 2025.
- June 22 – A man with a rifle and handgun opens fire outside a church in Wayne, hitting one person in the leg. A church parishioner strikes the gunman with a truck before he is shot and killed by two security guards.
- June 27 - Ted Nugent brought a prohibited gun into the Michigan Capitol as he testified before the natural resources and tourism committee.
- June 30 – Siena Heights University in Adrian announced that, due to rising costs and increased competition for students, it would close at the end of the 2025–26 academic year. The school was founded in 1919.

=== July ===
- July 10 - WK Kellogg Co, the cereal company from Battle Creek, agreed to be acquired by Ferrero Rocher for $3.1 billion.
- July 15 - Tarik Skubal of the Detroit Tigers was the starting pitcher for the American League in the 2025 Major League Baseball All-Star Game.
- July 26 – In the 2025 Traverse City stabbing attack, a 42-year-old man went on a stabbing rampage at a Walmart near Traverse City. There were 11 victims, six of whom were injured critically. There were no fatalities. The assailant had been diagnosed with paranoid schizophrenia in 1999 and had a long criminal record.

=== August ===
- August 12 – A pickup truck ran a stop sign and crashed into a van in a rural area of Gilford Township, located east of Saginaw. The van was carrying 10 members of a local Amish community. Multiple occupants of the van were ejected from the vehicle, and six were killed. No charges were immediately filed against the driver of the pickup truck, though the matter remained under investigation.
- August 15 - The NCAA issued sanctions against the University of Michigan football program in connection with the University of Michigan football sign-stealing scandal. The monetary element of the sanctions were later estimated at $35 million.
- August 26 – Governor Whitmer signs House Bills 4047 and 4048 into law, making it illegal to produce deepfake pornography without consent from the person or people depicted.

=== September ===
- September 8 – U.S. District Judge David M. Lawson dismissed a lawsuit challenging a Hamtramck ordinance that prohibited LGBTQ+ pride flags from being hung on publicly owned flagpoles. The ordinance was enacted by an all-Muslim city council after a pride flag was flown from city flagpoles in 2021 and 2022. Under the ordinance, only five specified flags, including the American and Michigan flags, were permitted. The judge ruled that the ban did not violate the First Amendment, because it banned all private flags not just some.
- September 9 - Ingham County Judge Kristen Simmons dismissed criminal charges brought by the Michigan Attorney General against 15 individuals in the Michigan prosecution of fake electors. In December 2020, the defendants signed certificates claiming they were Michigan's duly-elected electors and that Trump won Michigan's electoral votes in the 2020 Presidential election. Judge Simmons found insufficient evidence of the requisite fraudulent intent. In November 2025, President Trump preemptively pardoned Michigan's so-called fake electors.

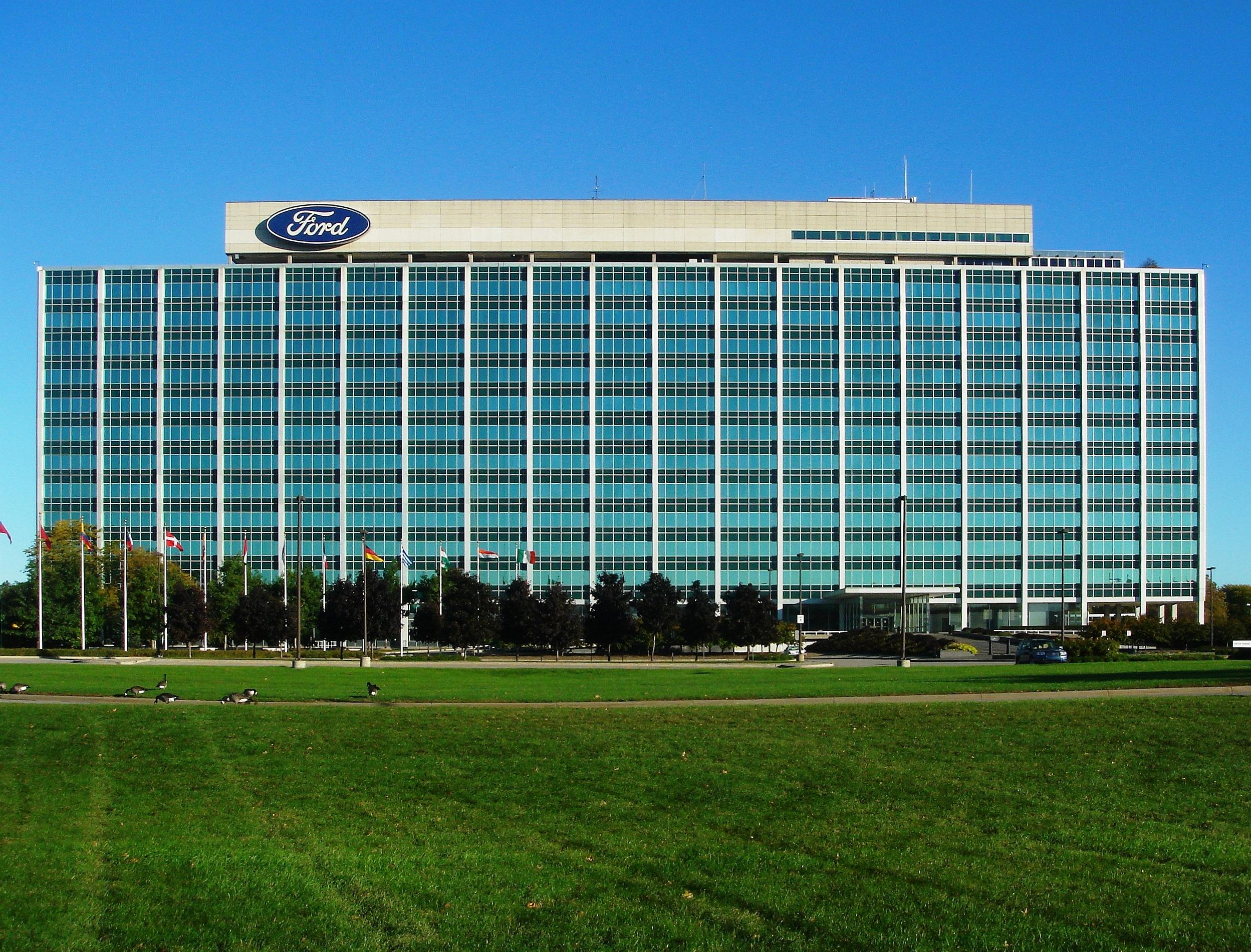
Ford "Glass House"

- September 15 - Ford announced that it would move its world headquarters from the iconic Glass House (pictured at right) to a new innovation hub near the Henry Ford Museum.
- September 28 – Five persons were killed in the Grand Blanc church attack, a mass shooting and arson at a Church of Jesus Christ of Latter Day Saints meeting house in Grand Blanc Township. The gunman, an Iraq war veteran, rammed his pickup truck into the meeting house, then exited the vehicle and opened fire with an assault rifle and set the building on fire. Four church members were killed, and the gunman was killed by police. The assailant had reportedly asserted that Mormons were "the anti-christ."

=== October ===
- October 2 - The Detroit Tigers defeated the Cleveland Guardians in the final game of American League Wild Card Series.
- October 6 - Fifth Third Bancorp agreed to purchase Comerica Bank for stock valued at $10.9 billion.
- October 14 - Stellantis announced investment of $13 billion in plants in Michigan and other states. It was described as the largest U.S. investment in company history.
- October 18 - October 2025 No Kings protests across the State of Michigan
- October 23 - As part of the 2025 NBA illegal gambling prosecution, former Detroit Pistons star and current Portland coach Chauncey Billups was arrested. He was allegedly involved in rigged poker games backed by the Mafia.
- Layoffs in electric vehicle production:

- October 29 - Due to weak demand following the termination of federal subsidies on electric vehicles, General Motors announced layoffs of 3,400 workers at electric vehicle and EV battery plants in Michigan (including Factory Zero) and Ohio.
- November 6 - A battery manufacturer announced the closure of plants in Midland and Auburn Hills.
- November 9 - Ford exended layoffs at its Dearborn Rouge complex and the Rouge Electric Vehicle Center where the Ford F-150 Lightning is assembled.

- October 31 - Two Dearborn residents were arrested in an FBI raid relating to an alleged ISIS-inspired plot to launch a terrorist attack or attacks. In the following days, four others were arrested for their alleged roles in the plots. According to some reports, the target of the attack was the U.S. Army's Tank-Automotive and Armaments Command (TACOM) facility at the Detroit Arsenal. Other reports stated that the plan was to carry out a terror attack in Ferndale over the Halloween weekend. Still other reports indicated that the men intended to attack gay bars in Dearborn, or the Cedar Point amusement park in Ohio.
- November 12 - The Michigan State football program was sanctioned by the NCAA for Level 1 violations, including impermissible inducements and benefits to recruits, under head coach Mel Tucker. The penalties included three years of probation for the program and vacating of 14 wins.

=== November ===
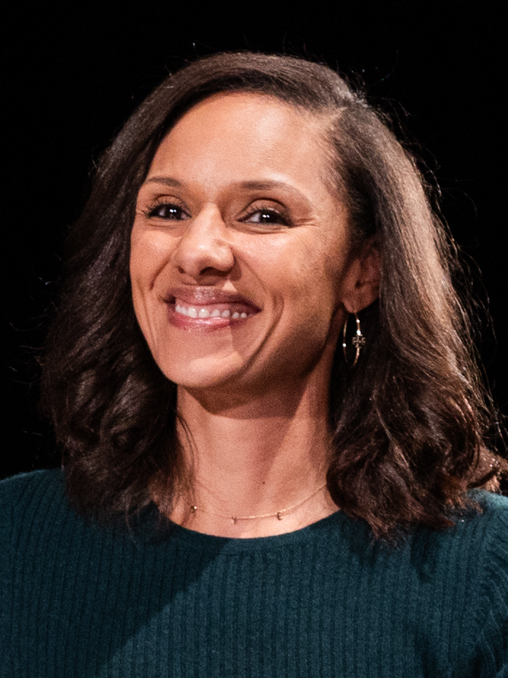
Mary Sheffield

- November 4
  - 2025 Detroit mayoral election: City Council President Mary Sheffield garnered 88,229 votes (77.4%) to defeat megachurch pastor Solomon Kinloch Jr. who received 25,725 votes (22.6%). She is the first woman to be elected mayor of Detroit.
  - 2025 Lansing mayoral election: Incumbent Mayor Andy Schor is reelected to a third term.
- The White Stripes were inducted into the Rock and Roll Hall of Fame.
- November 13 - General Motors and Dan Gilbert's Bedrock announced a $75 million cash commitment for their proposed $1.6 billion redevelopment of the Renaissance Center. The redevelopment would involve demolition of two of the five towers and remained contingent on approval of funding from the state's Transformational Brownfield program.
- Tarik Skubal of the Detroit Tigers won his second consecutive Cy Young Award.
- November 20 - President Trump claimed that US senator Elissa Slotkin was guilty of sedition and should be jailed or potentiall put to death for participating in a video uring members of the US Armed Forces to disobey illegal orders. Slotkin's home was the subject of a bomb threat the following day.
- November 24 - GM announced a $550 million investment in Michigan and Ohio plants to prepare for increased production in 2027. Some $300 million of the total was slated for Romulus Propulsion Systems to produce 10-speed transmissions for the company's pickup trucks and sports utility vehicles.
- November 27 - Eminem and Jack White perform together at halftime of the Detroit Lions' Thanksgiving game.
- November 30 - Michigan State fired its head football coach Jonathan Smith after the team finished the season with 4-8 record, including a 1-8 record against Big Ten opponents.

=== December ===
- December 5 - Greg and Dawn Williams pledged $401 million to Michigan State University. Of the total, $290 million was earmarked for the athletic department. It was, by nearly tenfold, the largest gift in the school's history.
- December 10 – Michigan Wolverines football head coach Sherrone Moore was fired for cause for having an inappropriate relationship with a staff member. Moore was detained by police later in the day and held in jail for two nights. On December 12, Moore was charged with third-degree home invasion, stalking in a domestic relationship, and breaking and entering. He was released after paying a $25,000 bond.
- December 20 – The Ferris State Bulldogs won the NCAA Division II football championship, beating the Harding Bisons 42–21, the team's fourth title since 2021.
- December 25 - The Lions were eliminated from playoff contention with a 23-10 loss to the Minnesota Vikings.
- December 26 - Michigan hired Kyle Whittingham as its new head football coach.

== Deaths ==
- January 1 – John B. O'Reilly Jr., mayor of Dearborn (2007–2021), at age 76 in Deaborn
- January 10 - Bill McCartney, Riverview native, Michigan defensive coordinator (1977-81), Colorado head coach (1982-1994), at age 84 in Boulder, Colorado
- February 8 - Dick Jauron, Detroit Lions player (1973–77) and coach (2004–05), at age 74 in Massachusetts
- February 9 - Wally Gabler, U-M quarterback (1964-65), CFL (1966-72), at age 80 in Heathcote, Ontario
- February - Harry Stewart Jr., Tuskegee airman, at age 100
- March 4 - Ted Lindsay, Detroit Red Wings (1944–65), at age 93 in Oakland, Michigan
- March 9 - Lawrence B. Mohr, political scientist at University of Michigan (1966–1969), at age 93 in Chicago
- March 16 – Darwin L. Booher, Michigan state senator (2011–2018) and state representative (2005–2010), at age 82 in Grand Rapids
- March 20 - Bill Cottrell, Detroit Lions offensive lineman (1965-1971), possibly the NFL's first black center, at age 80
- April 15 - Mike DeBord, U-M offensive coordinator (1997-1999), Central Michigan head coach (2000-03), national assistant coach of year (1997), at age 69
- May 2 - Lisa Brown-Miller, Union Lake native who won gold at 1998 Winter Olympics as a member of the women's ice hockey team, at age 58
- May 8 - Chet Lemon, Detroit Tigers (1982–90), at age 70 in Florida
- May 20 – Michael Cavanagh, chief justice of the Michigan Supreme Court (1991–1995), at age 84
- June 9 - Lucien Nedzi, US Congres (1961–1981), at age 100 in Reston, Virginia
- June 17 - Guido Tenesi, Detroit native, hockey player, portrayed Billy Charlebois, in the 1977 movie Slap Shot, at age 71
- July 1 - Alex Delvecchio, Detroit Red Wings (1950–74), at age 93 in Rochester, Michigan
- July 9 - Joe Coleman, Detroit Tigers pitcher (1971–76), at age 78 in Tennessee
- July 11 - Jimmy Lessnau, owner of Sully's Blues Bar
- August 7 - Jim Lovell, astronaut (Apollo 8 and 13) and University of Michigan alumnus, at age 97 in Lake Forest, Illinois
- August 4 - Mike Hill, Jackson native and golfer who won three times on PGA Tour, at age 86 in Ann Arbor
- August 11 - Sheila Jordan, jazz singer and Detroit native, at age 96 in New York City
- August 28 - Daryl Patterson, Detroit Tigers pitcher, 1968–1971, at age 81 in Clovis, California
- September 7 - Al Fracassa, Birmingham Brother Rice football coach (1969-2013), nine state championships, at age 92
- September 10 - Brian Eisner, UM tennis coach (1969-99), 18 BIg Ten championships, at age 85
- September 13 - Bob Goodenow, executive director NHL players association (1992-2005), at age 72 in Plymouth
- September 14 - Eddie Giacomin, Hall of Fame goaltender for New York Rangers and Detroit Red Wings, at age 86 in Birmingham, Michigan
- September 27 - Ray Lane, Detroit sportcaster, at age 95 in Farmington Hills
- October 7 - Carolyn Cheeks Kilpatrick, US Congress (1997–2011) and mother of Kwame Kilpatrick, at age 80 in Georgia
- November 6 - Marshawn Kneeland, Western Michigan DE (2019-2023), at age 24 in Grand Rapids, during his second season in NFL, after a police pursuit from an apparently self-inflicted gunshot wound
- November 14 - Tom Timmermann, Detroit Tigers pitcher (1969-1973), "Tiger of the Year" (1970), pro baseball record 27 infield outs in a nine-inning game, at age 85 in Northville
- December 1 - Elden Campbell, NBA seven-footer (1990-2005), won NBA championship with Detroit (2004), at age 57 in Florida, an accidental drowning
- December 4 - Roy Kramer, Central Michigan head football coach (1965-1977), Division II national champion (1974), SEC commissioner (1990-2002), College Football Hall of Fame (2023), at age 96 in Tennessee
- December 22 - Tom Maentz, U-M end 1954-56, second-team All-American, at age 91 in Bloomfield Hills

=== Gallery of 2025 deaths ===
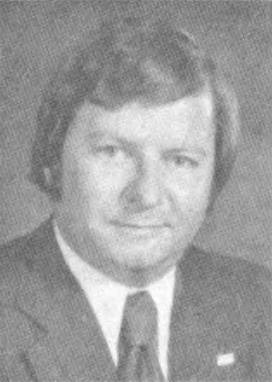
Michael Cavanagh

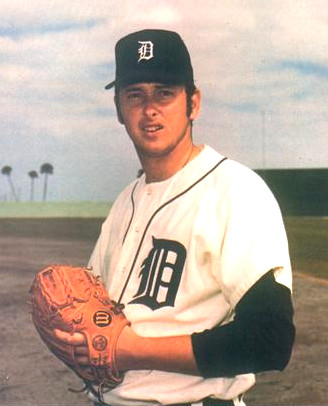
Joe Coleman

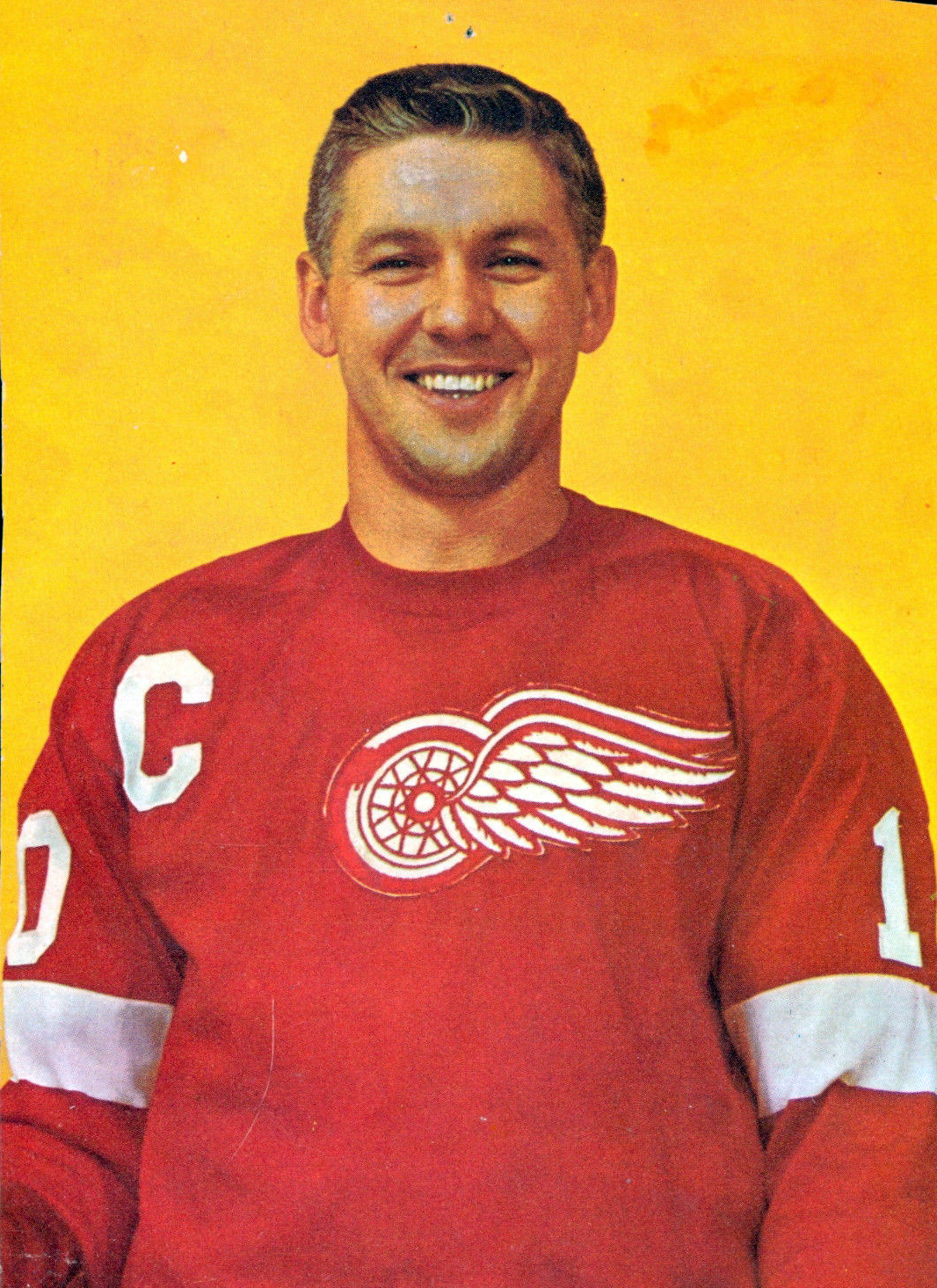
Alex Delvecchio

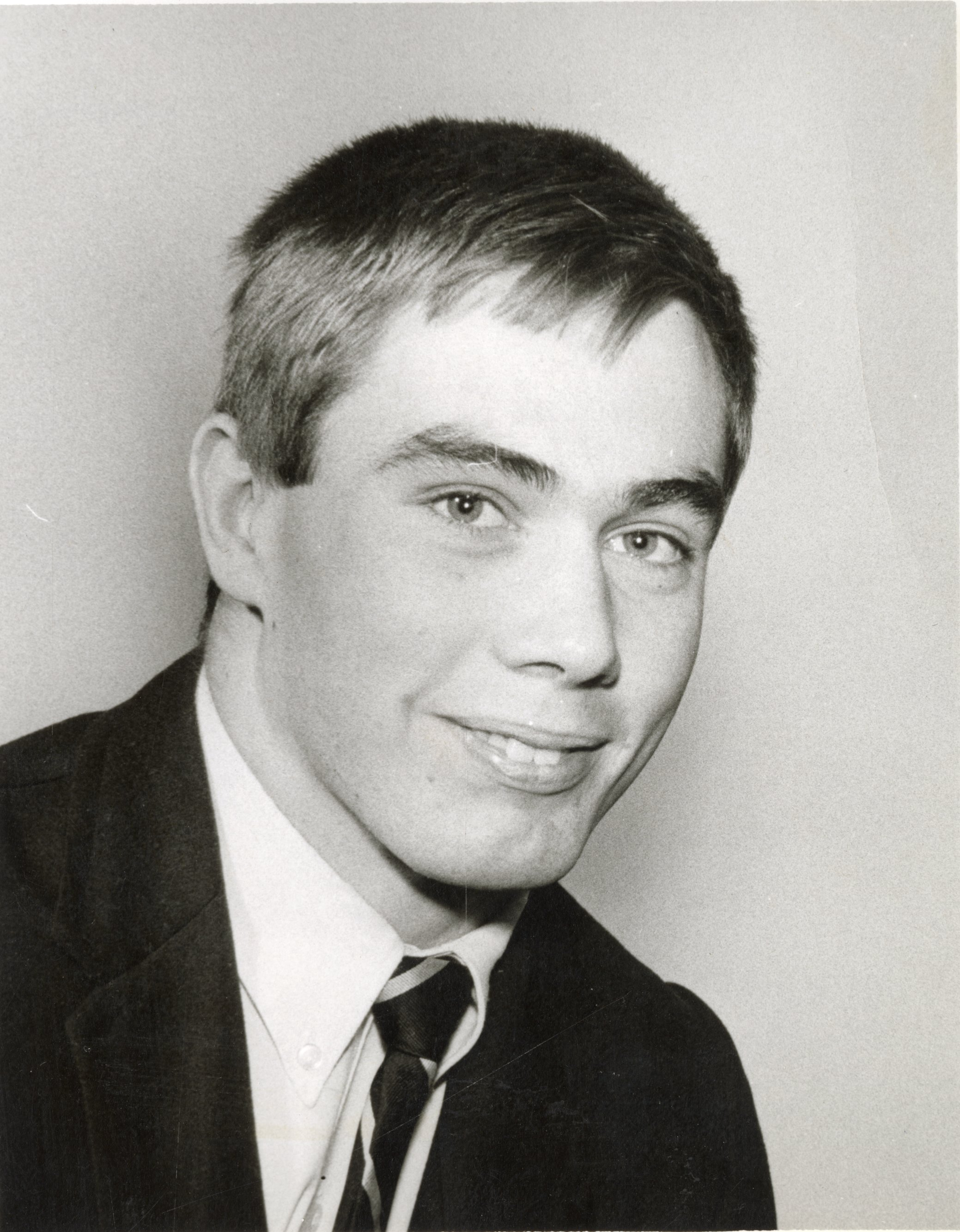
Dick Jauron

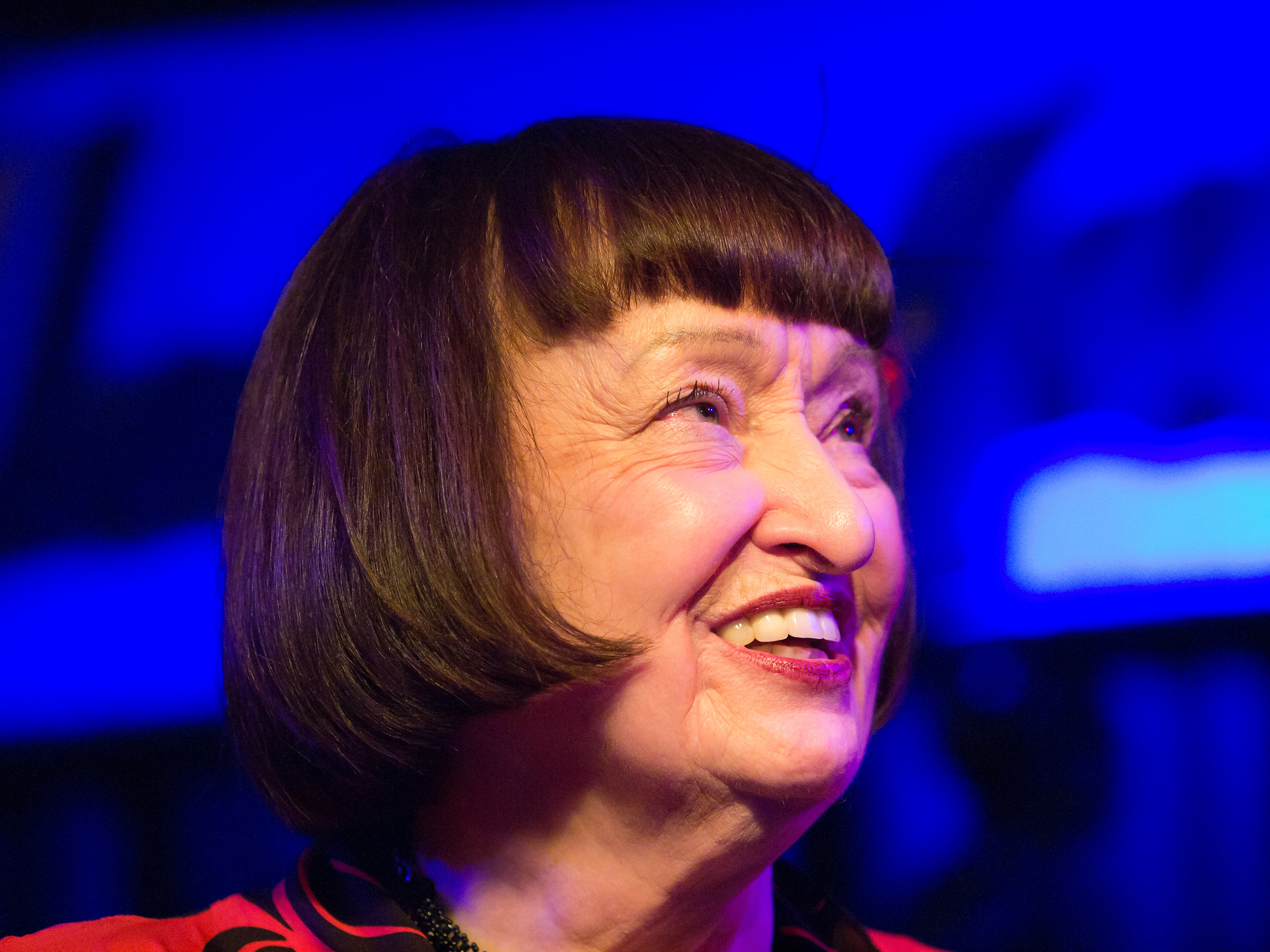
Sheila Jordan

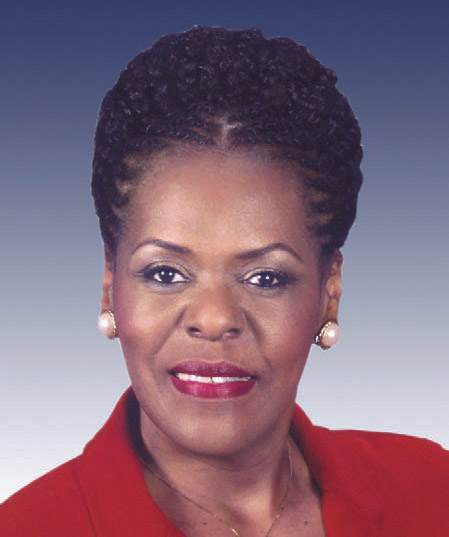
Carolyn Cheeks Kilpatrick

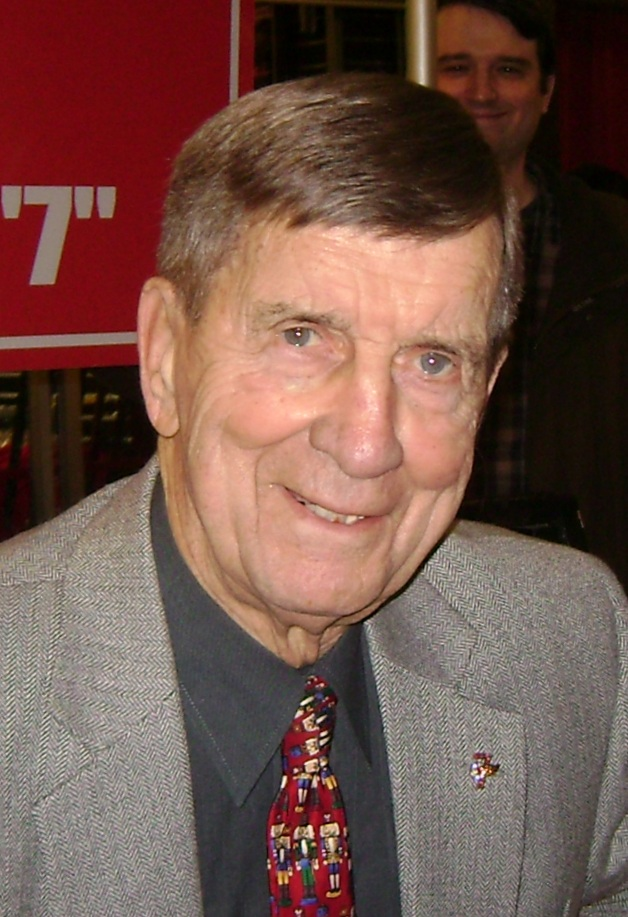
Ted Lindsay

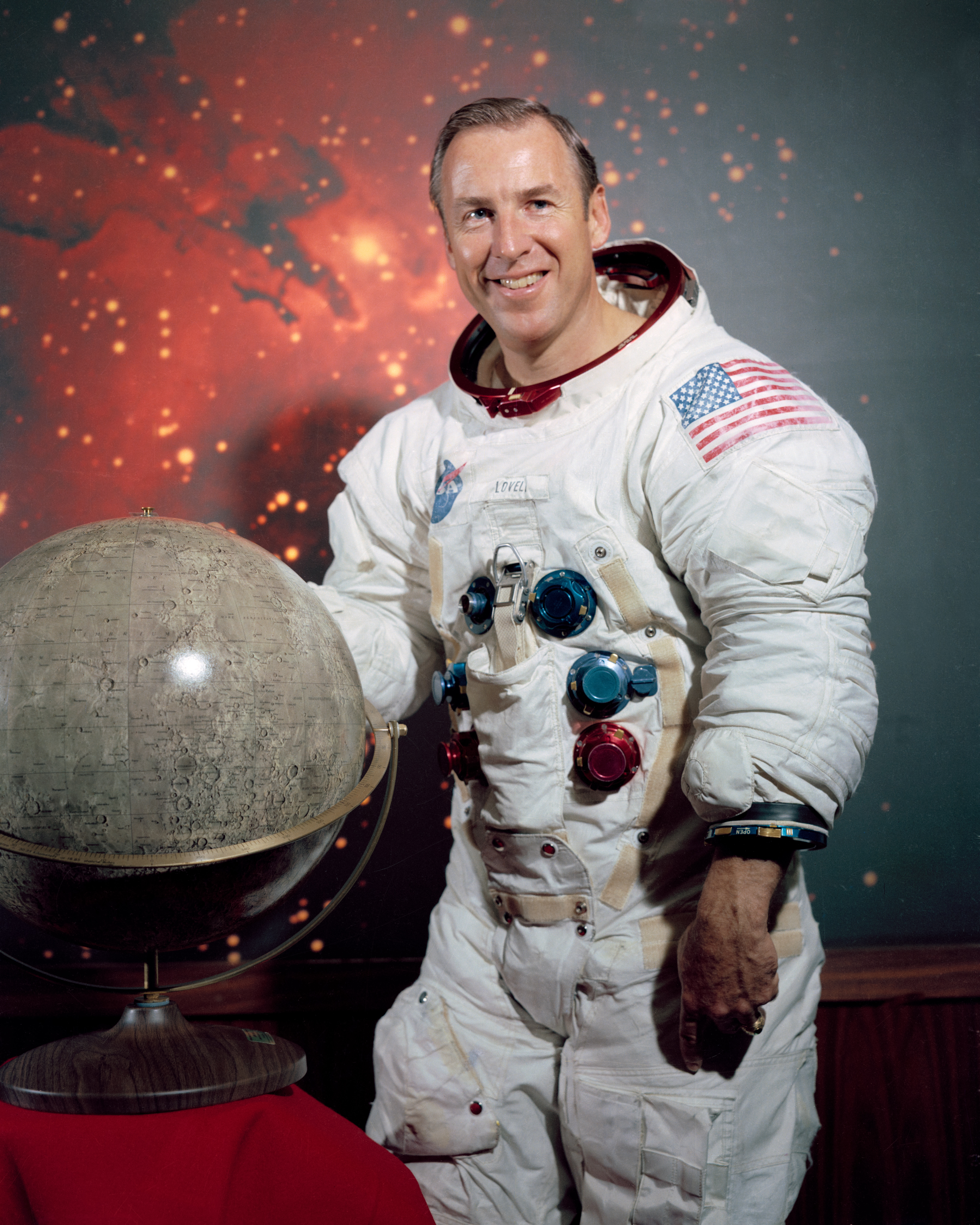
Jim Lovell

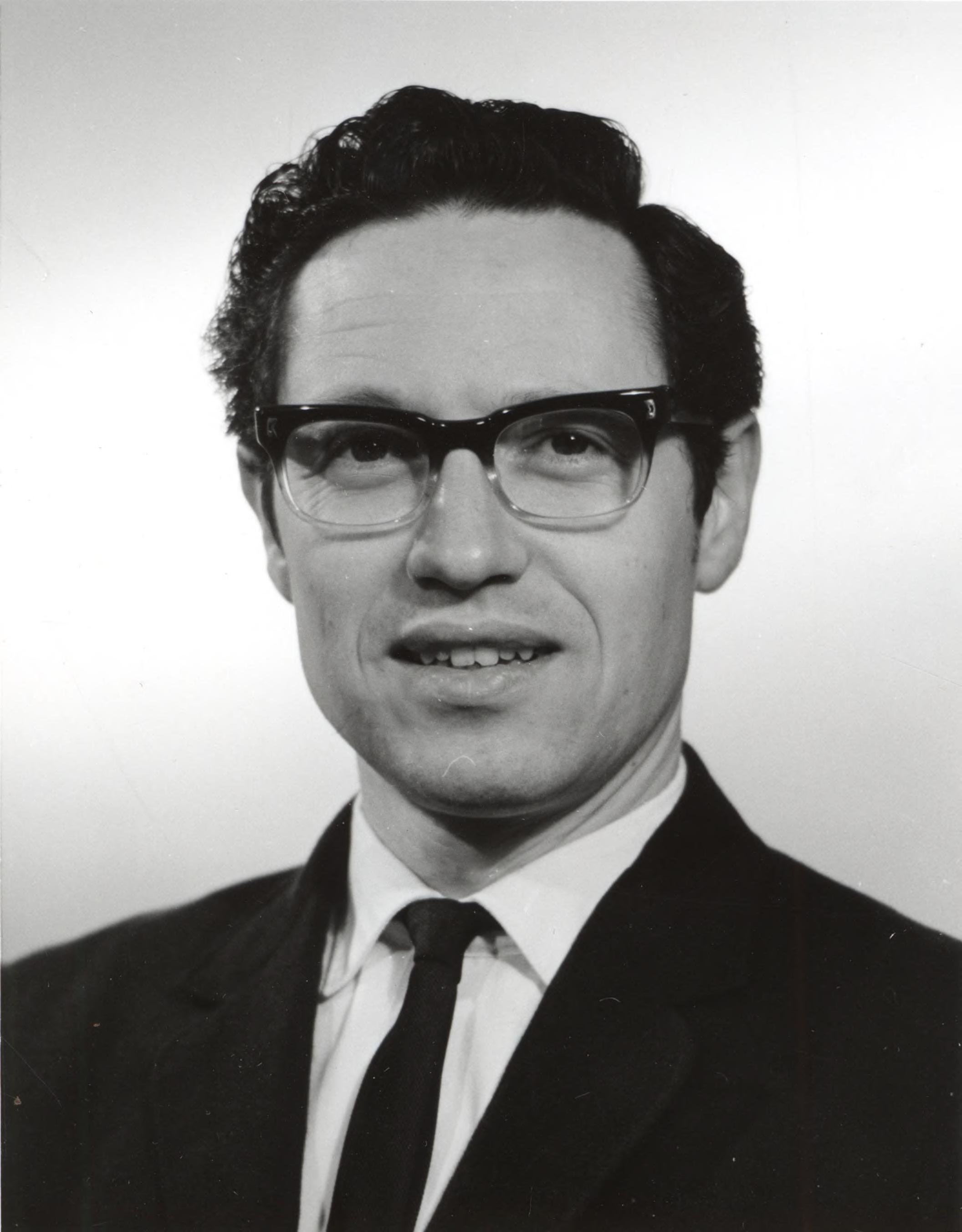
Lawrence B. Mohr

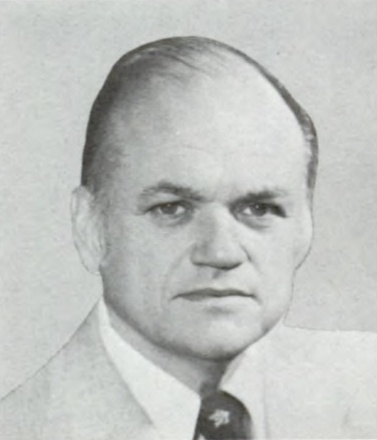
Lucien Nedzi

== See also ==
- 2025 in the United States
- 103rd Michigan Legislature
