= 2026 in Michigan =

- Decades: 2000s; 2010s; 2020s
- See also: History of Michigan; Historical outline of Michigan; List of years in Michigan; 2026 in the United States

This article reviews 2026 in Michigan, including the state's office holders, performance of its sports teams and athletes, a chronology of the state's top news and sports stories, and a list of notable Michigan-related deaths.

== Office holders ==
=== State office holders ===
- Governor: Gretchen Whitmer (D)
- Lieutenant Governor: Garlin Gilchrist (D)
- Attorney General: Dana Nessel (D)
- Secretary of State: Jocelyn Benson (D)
- Chief Justice, Supreme Court: Kyra Harris Bolden

=== Mayors of major cities ===
- Mayor of Detroit: Mary Sheffield

=== Federal office holders ===
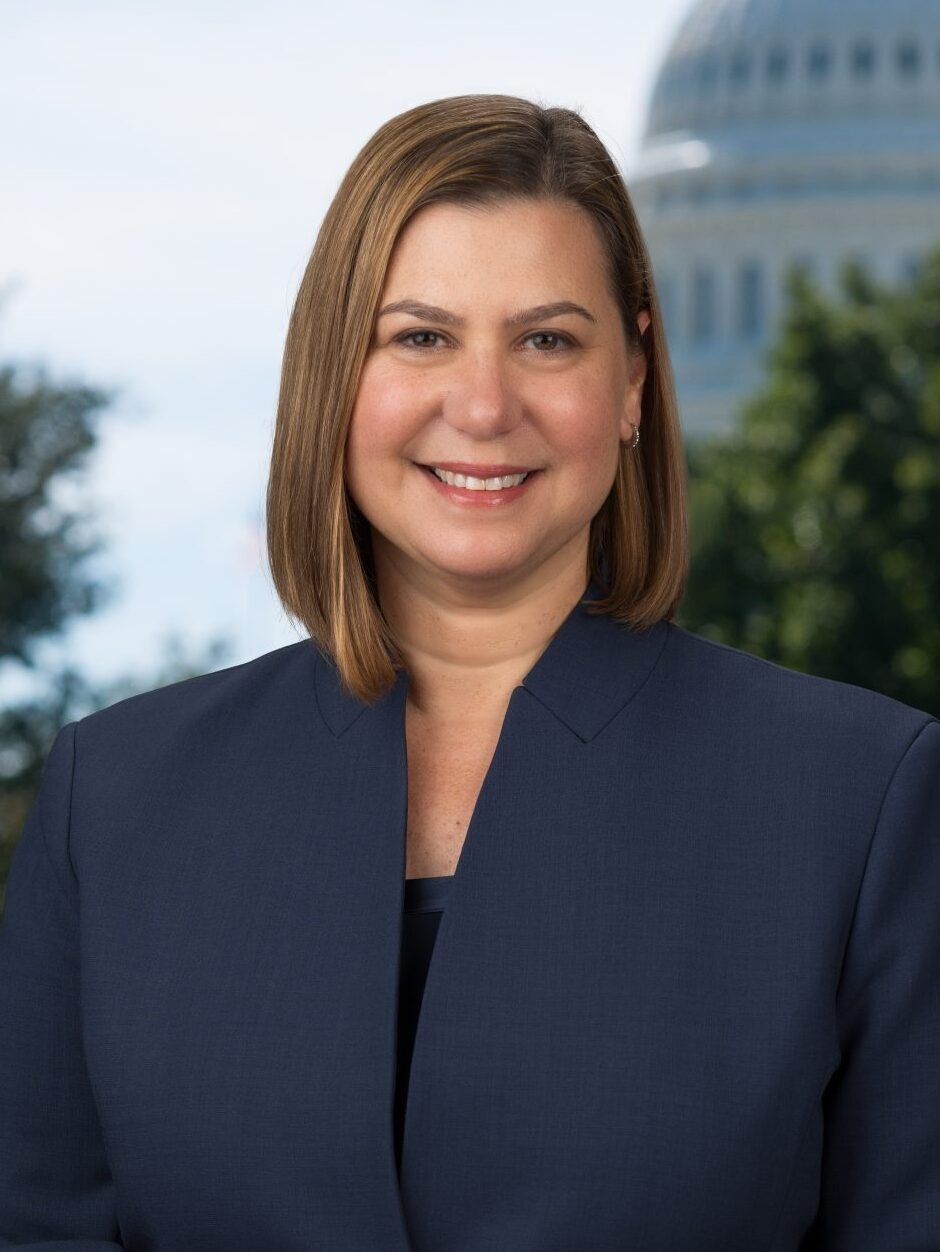
Elissa Slotkin

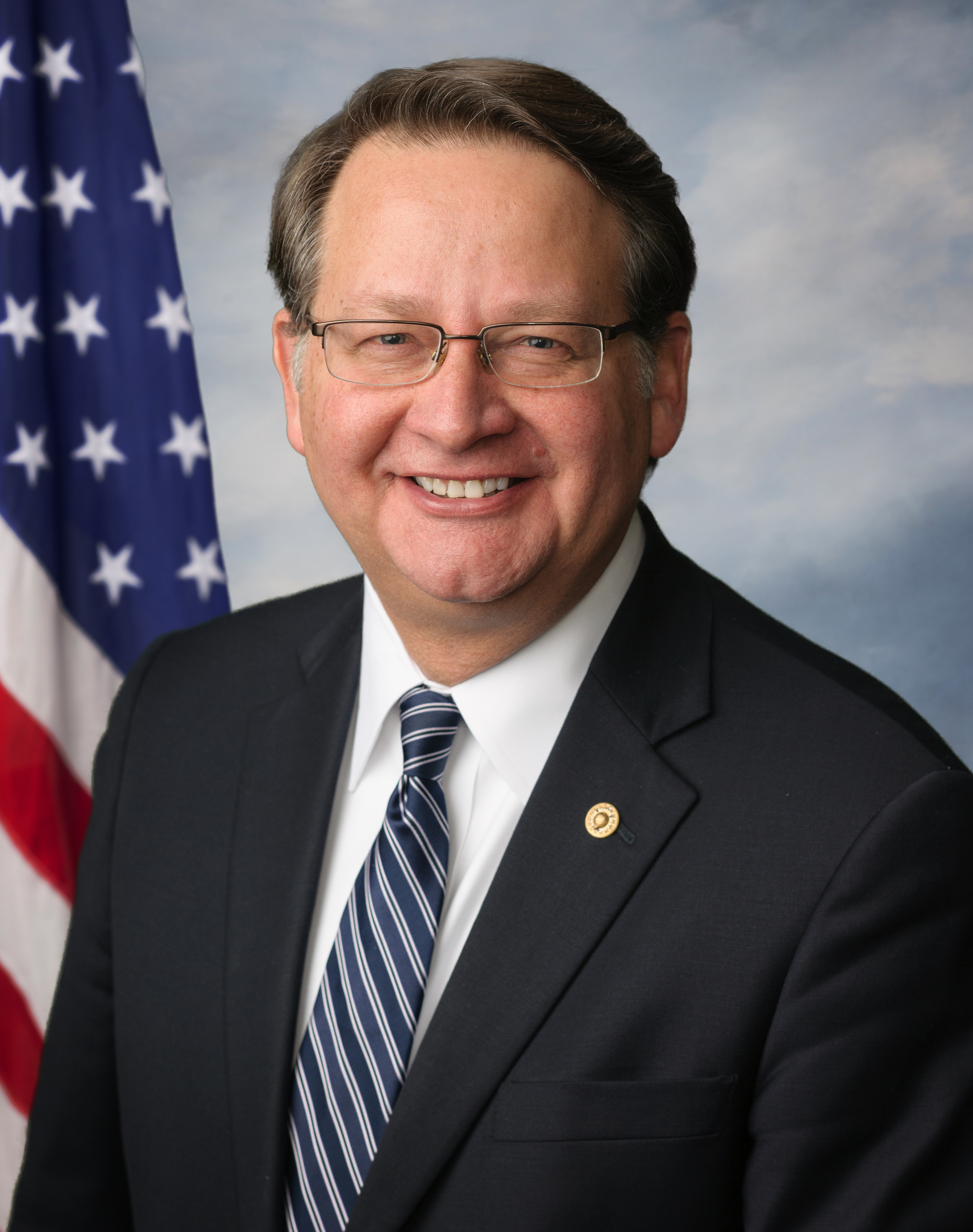
Gary Peters

- U.S. Senator: Elissa Slotkin (D)
- U.S. Senator: Gary Peters (D)
- House District 1: Jack Bergman (R)
- House District 2: John Moolenaar (R)
- House District 3: Hillary Scholten (D)
- House District 4: Bill Huizenga (R)
- House District 5: Tim Walberg (R)
- House District 6: Debbie Dingell (D)
- House District 7: Tom Barrett (R)
- House District 8: Kristen McDonald Rivet (D)
- House District 9: Lisa McClain (D)
- House District 10: John James (R)
- House District 11: Haley Stevens (D)
- House District 12: Rashida Tlaib (D)
- House District 13: Shri Thanedar (D)

== Sports ==
=== Baseball ===
- 2026 Detroit Tigers season
- 2026 Michigan Wolverines baseball team

=== American football ===
- 2026 Detroit Lions season
- 2026 Michigan Wolverines football team
- 2026 Michigan State Spartans football team

=== Basketball ===
- 2025–26 Detroit Pistons season
- 2025–26 Michigan State Spartans men's basketball team
- 2025–26 Michigan Wolverines men's basketball team
- 2025–26 Michigan Wolverines women's basketball team

=== Ice hockey ===
- 2025–26 Detroit Red Wings season
- 2025–26 Michigan Wolverines men's ice hockey season
- 2025–26 Michigan State Spartans men's ice hockey season
- 2025–26 Western Michigan Broncos men's ice hockey season

== Events ==
=== January ===
- January 19 – A snowstorm causes a pileup involving 100 cars in Zeeland Charter Township.
- January 23 – A car drives through an entrance at the Detroit Metropolitan Airport, injuring six people. The driver is taken into custody.

=== March ===
- March 6 – A tornado forms near Three Rivers, causing significant damage in Union City and other parts of St Joseph County. Four people are killed.
- March 12 – Temple Israel synagogue attack: A man rams a vehicle into a synagogue in West Bloomfield Township, injuring a security guard, before killing himself. Explosives are found in the back of the vehicle.
- March 28 – The Grand Valley State Lakers beat the Indiana University of Pennsylvania Crimson Hawks 72–49 to win the 2026 NCAA Division II women's basketball tournament, their second straight title.

=== April ===
- April 6 – The Michigan Wolverines beat the UConn Huskies 69–63 to win the 2026 NCAA Division I men's basketball championship game. It is Michigan's second title and their first since 1989.
- April 9
  - The Women's National Basketball Association announces an expansion team in Detroit, set to begin play in 2029.
  - The Trump administration sues Washtenaw County over its ICE policies. The policies bar the county from sharing information with ICE and bar agents from being on county property.

=== May ===
- May 6 – The Professional Women's Hockey League (PWHL) announces an expansion team in Detroit, set to begin play in the 2026–27 season.
- May 21 – The State House passes a bill that would allow Mackinac Island to control all aspects of ferry service to and from the island. The bill advances over a fare dispute between Mackinac Island and the private company that operates the only ferries to the island. The cities of St. Ignace and Mackinaw oppose the bill, as it allows Mackinac Island to control the price of ferry parking in their cities.

=== June ===
- June 10 – Gaza war protests at universities: Federal prosecutors charge eight pro-Palestinian activists with conspiring to intimidate officials at the University of Michigan over the school's financial ties to Israel.

=== July ===
- July 15–17 – 2026 Canadian wildfires: Smoke from wildfires pushes air quality across Michigan into the hazardous range.
- July 20 – A state appeals court tosses out convictions for two men convicted of plotting to kidnap Governor Gretchen Whitmer in 2020. The court-overturned convictions were for providing material support for terrorism, with the court writing that kidnapping is not a felony that can support a conviction under Michigan's terrorism laws.
- July 24 – A Grand Haven man fatally shoots his wife and six children before setting the house on fire and killing himself.
- July 27 – The Gordie Howe International Bridge between Detroit and Windsor, Ontario opens for traffic.

=== August ===
- August 1 – The state of Michigan reports cyberattacks on nine water systems. The cyberattacks are reported days after Minnesota reported similar cyberattacks.
- August 4 – Primary elections are held for multiple races.
  - Abdul El-Sayed beats Representative Haley Stevens to win the U.S. Senate Democratic primary.
  - Thomas Smith wins the Republican primary in U.S. House District 8, despite having dropped out and endorsed another candidate. Smith wins over Trump-endorsed candidate Amir Hassan.
- August 14 – A man kills five people and injures one in a series of shootings across several locations in Missaukee County.

=== September ===
- September 5 – 2026 Western Michigan vs. Michigan football game: In college football, the Western Michigan Broncos play the Michigan Wolverines at Michigan Stadium in Ann Arbor. Western Michigan leads 12–7 following a failed Hail Mary pass by Michigan as time appears to expire. However, Big Ten officials controversially add one second to the clock, allowing Michigan to throw a successful Hail Mary and score a touchdown to win 13–12.
- September 17 – An F-16 plane crashes in Green Lake Township. The pilot ejects before the crash and is treated at a hospital.
- September 20 – A man from Guatemala is killed in a crash while fleeing ICE agents in Grand Rapids.
- September 27 – Three people are killed and four injured in a shooting following an argument at an after-hours strip club in Detroit.

=== November ===
- November 1 – Democratic Haley Stevens endorses Republican Mike Rogers over Democratic Abdul Al-Sayed, who had defeated Stevens in the primaries for the Senate nomination. The Michigan Democratic Party revoke Stevens's party membership.
- November 3
  - 2026 Michigan gubernatorial election: Michigan Secretary of State Jocelyn Benson (D) wins the election, beating Republican Representative John James.
  - 2026 United States Senate election in Michigan: Abdul El-Sayed (D) wins the election, beating former Representative Mike Rogers (R). El-Sayed is the first Muslim to be elected to the U.S. Senate.

== See also ==
- 2026 in the United States
