= James E. McBryde =

American politician (1950–2024)

James Edward McBryde (September 23, 1950 – December 30, 2024) was an American businessman and politician.

== Life and career ==
McBryde was born in Santa Monica, California, and graduated from Central Michigan University in 1972. He lived in Mount Pleasant, Isabella County, Michigan, with his wife and family. McBryde was a sales representative. He served on the Isabella County Commission from 1985 to 1990 and was a Republican. McBryde then served in the Michigan House of Representatives from 1991 to 1998. He served as the president and CEO of the Middle Michigan Development Corporation. McBryde died in Mount Pleasant on December 30, 2024, at the age of 74.
