= 2025 Traverse City stabbing attack =

Stabbing attack in Michigan, U.S.

2025 Traverse City stabbing
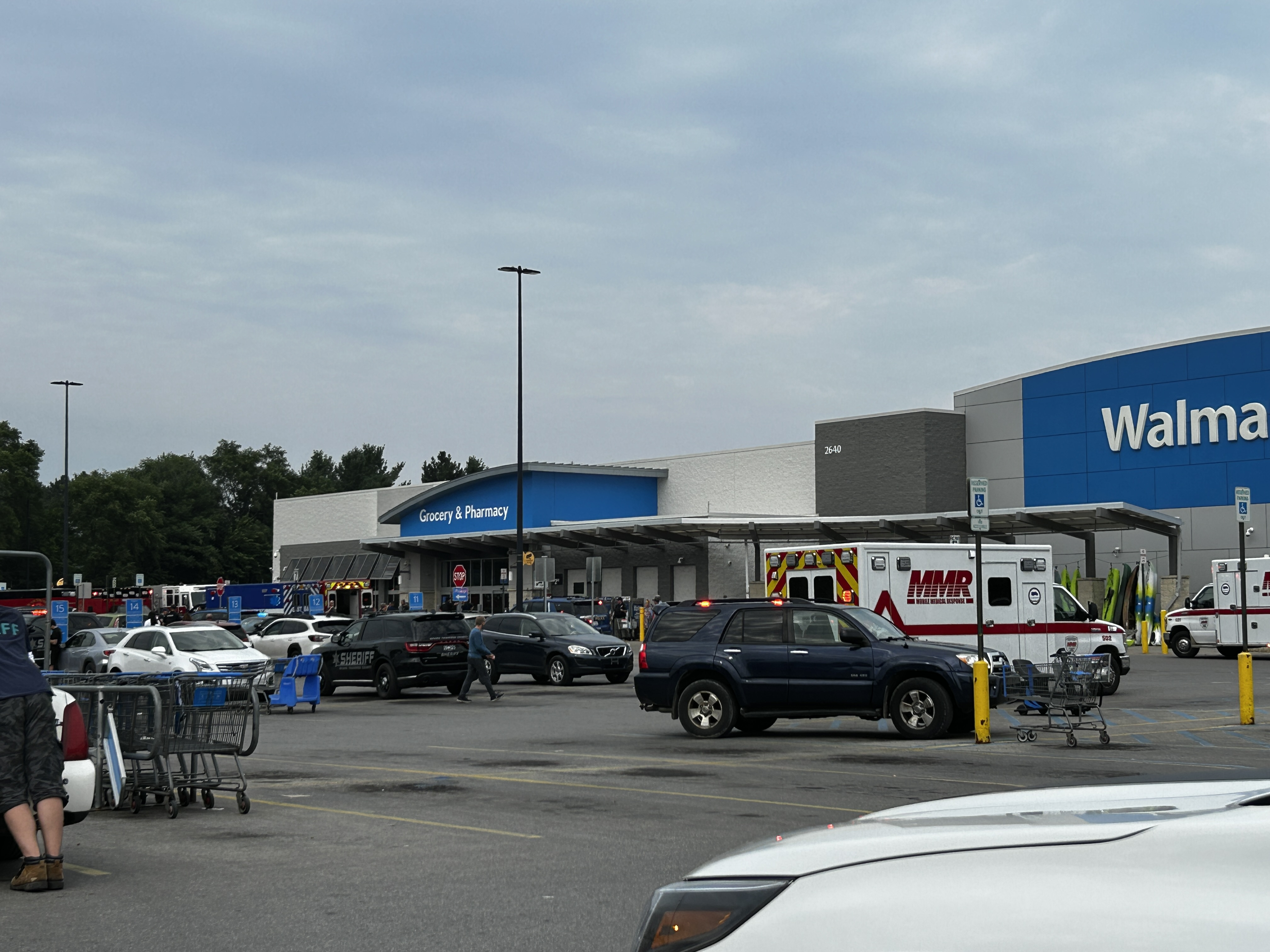
- Multiple ambulances in the Walmart parking lot shortly after the attack
- Location: 44°43′41.3″N 85°37′57.5″W; Garfield Township, near Traverse City, Michigan, U.S.
- Date: July 26, 2025; 15 months ago c. 4:43 p.m. (EDT (UTC−4:00))
- Target: Random civilians
- Attack type: Mass stabbing; terrorist attack
- Weapon: Folding knife
- Injuries: 11
- Defenders: Derrick Perry, Matthew Kolakowski, other bystanders
- Motive: Under investigation
- Accused: Bradford James Gille
- Charges: 11 counts of attempted murder, use of a deadly weapon, aggravated assault and a single count of terrorism

On July 26, 2025, a mass stabbing was committed inside a Walmart store in Garfield Township, near Traverse City, Michigan, United States. Eleven people were injured, some with life-threatening injuries. Several bystanders helped in stopping the suspect, including Marine veteran Derrick Perry, who held the attacker at gunpoint with a handgun before another Marine veteran, Matthew Kolakowski, tackled him to the ground. Local law enforcement and residents praised Perry, Kolakowski, and the others who intervened for their bravery that likely saved lives.

Authorities said the attack was random, and that the suspect allegedly used a folding-style knife in the attack. Of the victims, six were male and five were female, and ranged in age from 29 to 84, with eight of the victims being elderly. After the attack, all victims were transported to Munson Medical Center in Traverse City. By August 6, all victims were released.

The suspect, Bradford James Gille, has been charged with attempted murder and terrorism.

== Attack ==
According to Grand Traverse County Sheriff Michael Shea, at approximately 4:10 p.m. EDT, Bradford James Gille, the suspect, entered the Walmart store in Garfield Township. After remaining in the store for over 30 minutes, Gille began his attack at around 4:43 p.m. in the back of the store, using a 3.5-inch (8.9 cm) folding knife. Gille then made his way to the vestibule, and eventually outside to the parking lot, where he was confronted and detained by bystanders. A total of 11 people were stabbed during the attack, including one Walmart employee.

== Accused ==
The Grand Traverse County Sheriff's Office identified the suspect as Bradford James Gille (born May 19, 1983), a 42-year-old resident from Afton, Michigan, who also had ties to the neighboring cities of Petoskey and Cheboygan. Gille lived in Northern Michigan throughout most of his life, and has lived in several nearby counties across the area, including in Cheboygan, Emmet, and Presque Isle counties. Gille once resided in Florida for several years in the 2010s, where he served 49 days in jail there for vandalism in 2014, as well as a controlled substance violation charge in 2012.

The Detroit News accessed court records that described Gille as a persistent menace with a long history of criminal behavior and mental health problems. Gille was reportedly diagnosed with paranoid schizophrenia in 1999, and his history of serious mental health issues and rap sheet spans since then. Between 2015 and September 2024, Gille lived in the Center For Forensic Psychiatry in the Ann Arbor suburb of Saline, Michigan. Gille's mother told the Petoskey News-Review in 2007 that her son, who grew up in Petoskey, was fine when he took his medicine, adding that "the problem is his illness tells him that he is fine and doesn't need to take his medication. He's also been through the (mental health) evaluations so many times that he knows how to answer their questions." She added that his behavior was controlled the best when he was either in jail or on probation.

During his last few years in normal life in January 2024, Gille wrote a self-published book titled The Book of I Jesus Christ, which tells the story on how Gille became a Christian at age 14 in 1997 following an "unfortunate loss of one of his close friends". Gille's brother, who resided in Pellston, replied in an interview with the MLive Media Group, saying that his system "failed every one of us", adding that the attack "wasn't targeted at anybody, it was mental illness that the Gille family had been dealing with since 1997."

Gille last resided at the North Country Inn in Cheboygan prior to the attack, and had an extensive criminal history dating back to 2006, which includes the Florida charges as well as domestic violence in 2007, assault and battery in 2008, and public intoxication in 2015. A person who lived in the motel on U.S. Highway 23 confirmed Gille walked out three months prior to the attack saying he was going to Traverse City after scraping the number off of his room. According to authorities, officials from Petoskey got a court order from the Emmet County Probate Court, to find and detain Gille. An Emmet County deputy replied that they spent the whole day looking for him until the tragedy happened. Following his arrest, Gille was transported to the Grand Traverse County Jail and was charged with 11 counts of attempted murder, use of a deadly weapon, aggravated assault and a single count of terrorism. Gille pleaded not guilty on July 28. On August 22, Gille was ruled as incompetent to stand trial.

== Lawsuit ==
On December 2, 2025, Morgan & Morgan filed a lawsuit against Walmart and Gille alleging criminal negligence and assault, seeking $25,000 in damages on behalf of one victim.
