= 1970 Michigan Secretary of State election =

- November 3, 1970
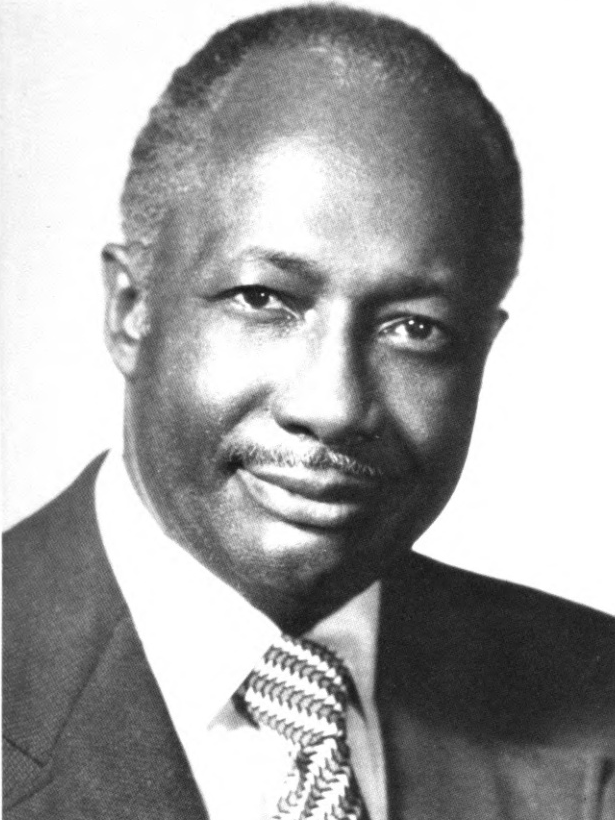

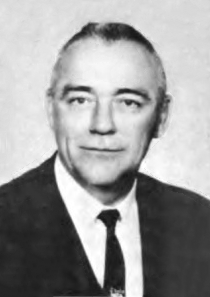
Nominee	Richard H. Austin	Emil Lockwood
Party	Democratic	Republican
Popular vote	1,423,801	1,110,600
Percentage	55.65%	43.41%
Secretary of State before election
James M. Hare
Democratic
Elected Secretary of State
Richard H. Austin
Democratic

The 1970 Michigan Secretary of State election was held on November 3. Incumbent Democrat James M. Hare did not run for re-election. Democratic nominee Richard H. Austin defeated Republican nominee Emil Lockwood. Austin was the first African American Michigan Secretary of State.

== History ==
On September 18, 1969, incumbent Democratic Michigan Secretary of State James M. Hare officially announced he would not be seeking seeking an 8th term in 1970. Hare had continuously served as state secretary of state since 1955. He explained that he had made the decision for health reasons.

=== Democratic nomination ===
Bay County Clerk Steven Toth announced his candidacy for secretary of state in October 1969.

In April 1970, Democratic gubernatorial candidate Sander Levin said the party should have an African American on the statewide ballot. It was reported by United Press International that Richard H. Austin was favored by the Democratic Party's Black caucus for the position of secretary of state. Austin was the state's first Black Certified Public Accountant and had been serving as Wayne County auditor since 1966. He had narrowly lost the 1969 Detroit mayoral election to Roman Gribbs. Austin initially refused to run.

On June 24, William R. Blue, former congressional nominee, announced his candidacy for secretary of state. On June 27, Billie S. Farnum, former Michigan Auditor General and congressman, announced his candidacy. In July, former state representative Charles F. Gray announced his candidacy. Gray was backed by incumbent Hare for the position. Soon before the convention, on August 19, Austin confirmed himself as a candidate for the secretary of state position.

The Democratic State Convention was held from August 22 to 23 at Civic Auditorium in Grand Rapids. Blue and Gray withdrew their candidacies on August 22. Blue backed Austin after dropping out. Farnum and Toth withdrew later. Austin won nomination at the convention.

=== Republican nomination ===
State Senate Majority Leader Emil Lockwood's intention to seek Republican nomination for secretary of state was reported on by December 1969. In January 1970, Lockwood confirmed he would not be running for re-election in the state Senate, though he did not confirm his candidacy for the secretary of state position. Weldon O. Yeager announced his secretary of state candidacy on April 20. Yeager was the only Republican state representative from Detroit at the time. Lockwood officially announced his candidacy on June 1. He resigned as state Senate majority leader to campaign.

The Republican State Convention was held from August 28 to 29 at Cobo Hall in Detroit. At the convention, the Michigan's two members of the Republican National Committee supported different secretary of state candidates. Committeeman Harold M. McClure supported Lockwood, while Committeewoman Ely M. Peterson supported Yeager. After a nearly two hour roll call, the official tally showed 800 votes for Lockwood and 790 votes for Yeager, resulting in Lockwood's nomination. Yeager pledged to support the state's party ticket.

=== Third party nominations ===
The Socialist Workers Party convention was held in February in Detroit. John Hawkins, a 21-year old student at Wayne State University, was nominated for secretary of state.

The Socialist Labor Party held their convention on April 12 in Detroit. Frank Troha was nominated for secretary of state. Troha was a milkman from Oak Park. He was the party's secretary of state nominee in 1966.

In late August, the American Independent Party held their convention in Mount Clemens. Ku Klux Klan leader Robert E. Miles was nominated for secretary of state. He was Grand Dragon of the United Klans of America in Michigan. He won 132 votes at the convention, 32 other votes going to a housewife from Lansing.

=== General election ===
Democratic nominee Richard H. Austin defeated Republican nominee Emil Lockwood in the general election on November 3. Austin was sworn in on January 1, 1971. Austin was the first African American Michigan Secretary of State.

== Results ==
The following are the official results as printed in the 1971–1972 Michigan Manual.

1970 Michigan Secretary of State election (Note: County election results in Baraga County, Cass County, and Saginaw County were changed and corrected, but were not updated in the official state results.)
Party	Candidate	Votes	%
Democratic	Richard H. Austin	1,423,801	55.65%
Republican	Emil Lockwood	1,110,600	43.41%
American Independent	Robert E. Miles	18,103	0.70%
Socialist Workers	John Hawkins	3,182	0.12%
Socialist Labor	Frank Troha	2,683	0.10%
Write-in		18	0.00%
Total votes		2,558,387	100.0
Democratic hold			
