= 1973 Detroit mayoral election =

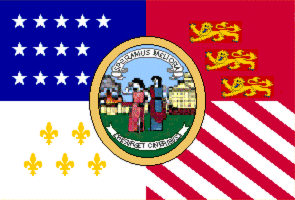
- November 6, 1973
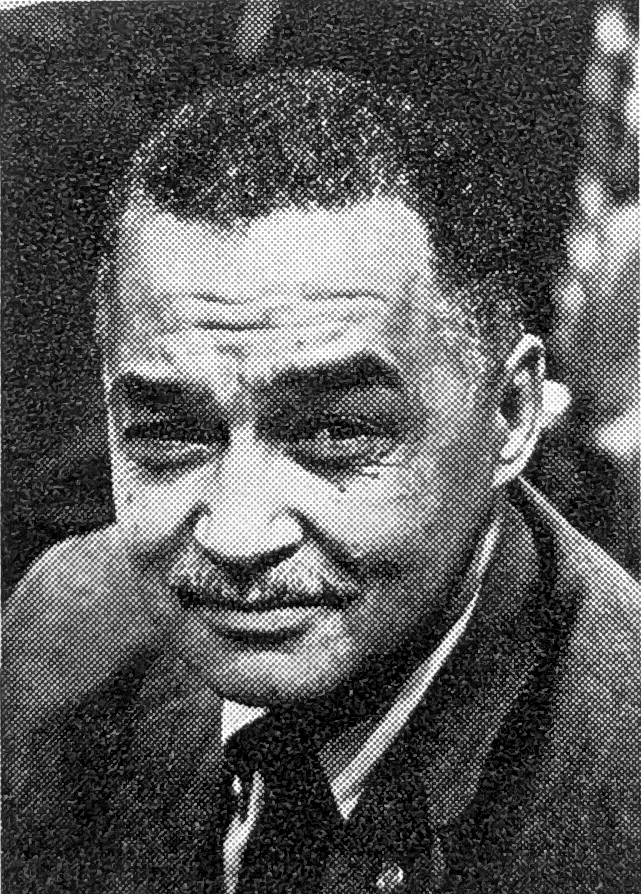

Candidate	Coleman Young	John Nichols
Party	Nonpartisan	Nonpartisan
Popular vote	231,789	217,479
Percentage	51.59%	48.41%
Mayor before election
Roman Gribbs
Democratic
Elected mayor
Coleman Young
Democratic

The 1973 Detroit mayoral election took place on November 5, 1973. It saw the election of Coleman Young as the first Black mayor of the city.

== Background ==
=== Detroit ===
In the previous 1969, Detroit mayoral election, which saw a narrow victory by Roman Gribbs, runner-up Richard H. Austin was the first Black person to be a major candidate for mayor of Detroit.

On December 29, 1972, Mayor Gribbs announced that he would not seek reelection. The New York Times wrote that it was expected that the election to select his successor would mirror 1969's election, in that it would see a Black candidate and a White candidate in the general election. Among the Black individuals seen as potential contenders were Michigan state senator Coleman Young, Judge Edward Bell, Detroit Common Councilor Ernest Browne, Gribbs aide Walter Greene, and Wayne County Sheriff William Lucas. Liberal Detroit Common Council president Mel Ravitz was initially seen as the most prominent potential White candidate for mayor.

While Black voter registration had strongly lagged behind White voter registration in 1969, by 1973, the number of Black voters registered was much closer to the number of White voters registered. Previously, ahead of the September 10, 1969 primary, Black voter registration was estimated to be at 42%, compared to White voter registration, which was estimated to be at 58%.

=== Elections of Black mayors in other cities ===
1967 had seen the historic elections of Carl Stokes in the Cleveland mayoral election and Richard G. Hatcher in the Gary, Indiana, mayoral election, the first elections of Black people as mayors of cities over 100,000. In 1970, Newark, New Jersey, joined along as a city of over 100,000 to elect a Black mayor, when it elected Kenneth A. Gibson. Cincinnati joined along with its 1972 election of Ted Berry.

Detroit would not be the only United States city with a population over 100,000 to elect its first Black mayor in 1973. Earlier that year, Atlanta had elected Maynard Jackson and Los Angeles had elected Tom Bradley. The same day that Detroit elected Young, Raleigh, North Carolina, elected Clarence Lightner. Additionally, Dayton, Ohio, elected James H. McGee (who had previously been appointed mayor in 1970) outright to a full term that year. The preceding elections in Atlanta and Los Angeles were perhaps good omens for Young's chances in Detroit, as both city's had also seen strong, but unsuccessful, campaigns by Black candidates in 1969, prior to the successful campaigns by Black candidates in 1973.

== Major candidates ==
In total, nineteen candidates ran. There were five major candidates. The remaining fourteen candidates were largely unknown.

- Edward Bell, former Wayne County Circuit Court judge
- John Nichols, former Detroit Police Commissioner (held this position until after primary election)
- Mel Ravitz, Detroit Common Council president
- John Mogk, Wayne State University law professor
- Coleman Young, Michigan state senator

== Primary ==
The nonpartisan primary election was held on September 11, 1973.

=== Campaign ===
Two Black candidates ultimately ran, Edward Bell and Coleman Young.

Nichols ran a "law-and-order" focused candidacy.

Ravitz was a well-established liberal. He received endorsements from most of the city's powerful trade unions, including the Detroit Building Trades Council, Teamsters, and United Auto Workers.

Young was considered by the Associated Press to be a threat to Ravitz, as both were seeking similar liberal voters.

Bell was a Republican. Since Detroit was considered a Democratic Party stronghold, his party affiliation was seen as a potential liability for him.

Mogk campaigned through undertaking a walking tour of the city. He was endorsed in the primary by the editorial board of the Detroit Free Press.

Shortly before the primary election, strife arose between the two Black candidates running. At the start of early September, at a nonpartisan Colorado conference featuring Black political leaders such as Julian Bond, and Richard Hatcher, it had been decided that the group would host nonpartisan get out the vote rallies in Detroit featuring Black leaders of national prominence in aims of bringing about Black political unity in the city. However, shortly after the conference ended, Young rejected this plan, as the way it had been pitched to him by Republican Inkster, Michigan mayor Edward Bivens, he was led to believe he would be prevented from inviting nationally prominent Black republican Democrats to endorse his candidacy. Bond and Fannie Lou Hamer endorsed Young's candidacy over that of Bell's soon afterwards. Bell criticized Bond and Young as having jeopardized the city's Black political unity, and of having hurt the chances of a Black candidate winning the election. Meanwhile, Young accused Republicans involved in the planned rallies of having been scheming to aid Bell's candidacy.

On the eve of the primary election, the Associated Press saw Nichols and Ravitz as being the front-runners. It saw the two Black candidates, Bell and Young, as being the next-strongest contenders. It saw Mogk as a dark horse candidate, but believed that he might, "be the only challenger with potential to siphon away Nichols support and negotiate an upset."

=== Results ===
Having placed first and second, Nichols and Young advanced to the general election ballot.

1973 Detroit mayoral primary election Nonpartisan election
Candidate	Votes	%
John Nichols	96,655	
Coleman Young	63,075	
Mel Ravitz	52,527	
John Mogk	35,458	
Edward Bell	25,753	
Others		

== General election ==
=== Campaign ===
While the election was nonpartisan, both Nichols and Young were Democrats.

Young was endorsed by the editorial boards of both of the city's two major newspapers, as well as by the major trade unions. Nichols received the endorsements of the city's police groups, white ethnic clubs, and homeowner associations.

The campaign chiefly focused on the city's very high crime rate and the operations of the Detroit Police Department. Young ran as an opponent of the Stop the Robberies, Enjoy Safe Streets (STRESS) unit that the Detroit Police Department had implemented under Mayor Gribbs. Nichols had been one of the creators of the unit. The campaign also included discussion of the racial makeup of the city's police department, with Young putting forth an affirmative action plan. The New York Times characterized the election as a, "vigorous campaign that was free of outright appeals to racial fear by either candidate," and observed that this was in contrast to the races in some of the other cities where a White and a Black candidate had faced each other for mayor that year. However, the campaign was still bitter in character compared to the tenor of the previous 1969 Detroit mayoral election.

On September 21, 1973, Mayor Gribbs fired Nichols as police commissioner, after Nichols refused to tenure his requested resignation. Gribbs had ousted Nichols out of a desire to separate the city election's politics and the operations of the Detroit Police Department separate. He also did so out of the belief that campaigning in a general election would be more demanding of Nichols than running in the primary had been, and that it would take him away from his duties as police commissioner.

=== Results ===
Voter turnout in the mayoral election declined from the record-high of 60.89% reached in the previous 1969 election. Turnout equaled more than 55% of the city's approximately 815,000 registered voters. United Press International attributed the lighter turnout to the cold weather on election day. None of the city's electoral precincts saw an increase in its turnout rate. While all neighborhoods declined in their turnout compared to the preceding election, the greatest decline in turnout was experienced in White neighborhoods on the city's northwest side, along its eastern boundary, and north of its downtown. Most Black precincts experienced only a moderate decrease, with turnout declining between 10% and 20%. The mean turnout in the city's 1,122 precincts was 50.64%, with a standard deviation of 8.23 percentage points. The mean turnout in the 295 precincts that were 90% or more Black was 52.89% with a standard deviation of 6.86%. The mean turnout in the 448 precincts that were 90% or more White was 50.76%, with a standard deviation of 7.08 percentage points.

While turnout declined, more individual precincts experienced overwhelming outcomes in which one of the two candidates carried them by over 90%.

1973 Detroit mayoral general election Nonpartisan election
Candidate	Votes	%
Coleman Young	231,790	51.60
John Nichols	217,478	48.40
Total votes	449,268	100

== Aftermath ==
Young would serve as mayor until 1994.

Detroit would not elect a White mayor again until 2013.
