= 2021 Detroit mayoral election =

- November 2, 2021
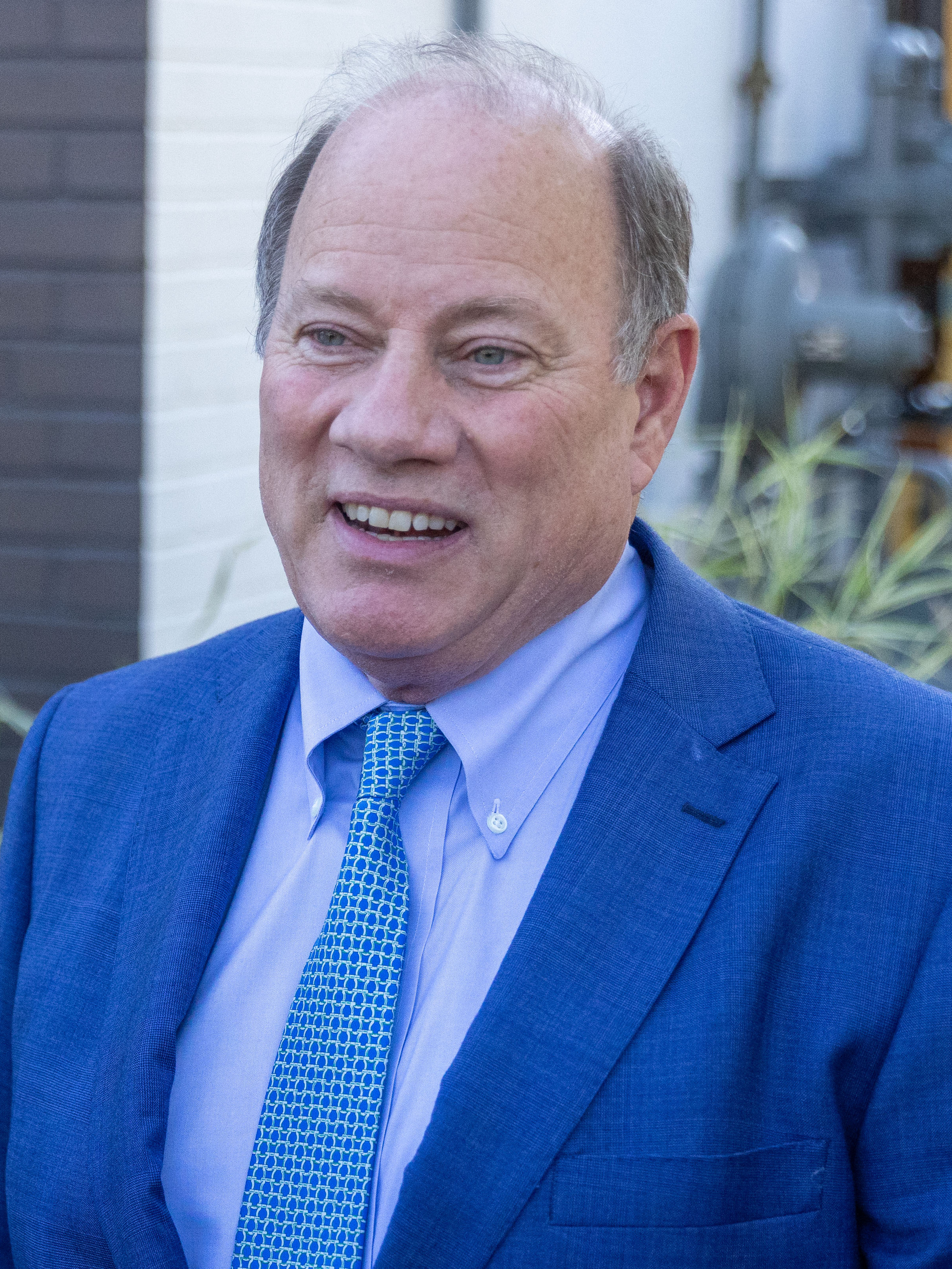

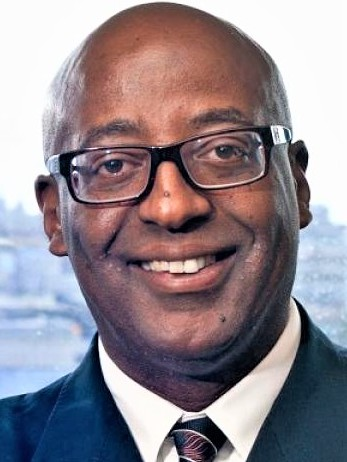
Candidate	Mike Duggan	Anthony Adams
Party	Nonpartisan	Nonpartisan
Popular vote	69,328	22,373
Percentage	75.27%	24.29%
- Precinct results Duggan: 50–60% 60–70% 70–80% 80–90% >90% Adams: 50–60% 60–70% >90% Tie: 40–50% 50% No data
Mayor before election
Mike Duggan
Democratic
Elected mayor
Mike Duggan
Democratic

The 2021 Detroit mayoral election occurred on November 2, 2021.

The Mayor of Detroit is elected on a non-partisan basis, where the candidates are not listed by political party. A non-partisan primary election was held on August 3, 2021. The top two finishers (incumbent mayor Mike Duggan and former deputy mayor Anthony Adams) advanced to the general election on November 2, 2021. Duggan won re-election with a decisive 75.6% of the vote.

== Candidates ==
=== Declared ===
- Anthony Adams, former deputy mayor under Kwame Kilpatrick and former president of the Detroit school board
- Tom Barrow, businessman and candidate for Mayor of Detroit in 1985, 1989, 2009 and 2013
- Kiawana Brown
- Mike Duggan, incumbent mayor
- Myya Jones, write-in candidate for Mayor of Detroit in 2017
- Jasahn Larsosa
- Charleta McInnis
- Danetta Simpson, candidate for Mayor of Detroit in 2017
- Arthur Tyus
- D. Etta Wilcoxon
- Cheryl Webb

=== Withdrawn or disqualified ===
- Articia Bomer, candidate for Mayor of Detroit in 2017
- Curtis Greene, author and candidate for Mayor of Detroit in 2017
- Emanuel Shaw

=== Declined ===
- Sherry Gay-Dagnogo, state representative
- Sharon McPhail, former city councillor, former general counsel to former mayor Kwame Kilpatrick, and candidate for mayor in 1993 and 2005
- Shri Thanedar, state representative and candidate for governor in 2018

== Primary ==
=== Endorsements ===
Mike Duggan

Officeholders

- Abdul El-Sayed, former Detroit Health Director and candidate for governor in 2018
- Warren Evans, Wayne County Executive
- Shri Thanedar, state representative and candidate for governor in 2018
- Gretchen Whitmer, Governor of Michigan

Newspapers

- Detroit Free Press
- The Detroit News

Groups

- Detroit Regional Chamber PAC

=== Polling ===
Poll source	Date(s) administered	Sample size (Note: Key: A – all adults RV – registered voters LV – likely voters V – unclear)	Margin of error	Anthony Adams	Tom Barrow	Mike Duggan	Myya Jones	Jasahn Larsosa	Other	Undecided
Target-Insyght	May 18–20, 2021	400 (LV)	± 5.0%	15%	2%	64%	1%	2%	2%	15%

=== Primary ===
2021 Detroit Mayoral primary election
Party	Candidate	Votes	%
Nonpartisan	Mike Duggan (incumbent)	50,853	74.01%
Nonpartisan	Anthony Adams	7,014	10.21%
Nonpartisan	Tom Joe Barrow	4,237	6.17%
Nonpartisan	Myya Jones	3,536	5.15%
Nonpartisan	Kiawana Brown	1,303	1.90%
Nonpartisan	D. Etta Wilcoxon	894	1.30%
Nonpartisan	Jasahn M. Larsosa	797	1.16%
Nonpartisan	Art Tyus	600	0.87%
Nonpartisan	DaNetta L. Simpson	476	0.69%
Nonpartisan	Charleta U. McInnis	389	0.57%
Write-in		133	0.19%
Turnout		68,709	13.76%

=== General ===
2021 Detroit Mayoral general election
Party	Candidate	Votes	%
Nonpartisan	Mike Duggan (incumbent)	69,329	75.27%
Nonpartisan	Anthony Adams	22,374	24.29%
Write-in		408	0.44%
Turnout		92,111	18.6%
