= John Nichols (law enforcement officer) =

American politician (1918–1998)

Oakland County Sheriff
- In office January 1985 – December 18, 1998
- Preceded by: Johannes Spreen
- Succeeded by: Mike Bouchard

Detroit Police Commissioner
- In office October 15, 1970 – September 21, 1973
- Mayor: Roman Gribbs
- Preceded by: Patrick V. Murphy
- Succeeded by: Philip G. Tannian

Farmington Hills, Michigan Police Chief
- In office October 10, 1977 – January 1985
- Preceded by: George Halverson
- Succeeded by: William Dwyer

Personal details
- Born: 1918
- Died: December 18, 1998 (age 80)
- Party: Republican; Democratic
- Education: Wayne State University

John Nichols (1918 – December 18, 1998) was an American law enforcement officer and politician who served as the sheriff of Oakland County, Michigan from 1985 to 1998. He previously served as the commissioner of the Detroit Police Department from 1970 to 1973, and the chief of police in Farmington Hills, Michigan from 1977 to 1985. He also unsuccessfully ran in the 1973 Detroit mayoral election, being narrowly defeated by Coleman Young.

== Early life and education ==
Nichols was born in 1918 in Detroit's southwest side's Hungarian community. In 1935, he graduated from the city's Southwestern High School at the age of sixteen.

Nichols would, in 1968, graduate with a degree in police administration from Wayne State University.

== Detroit Police Department career ==
Nichols joined the Detroit Police Department in 1942.

Nichols was in uniform during the 1943 Detroit race riot. Several days later he was drafted into the United States Army. He served 3.5 years in the United States Army, rising to the rank of captain and becoming a company commander in the European Theater of World War II. After his military service, in 1946, he rejoined the Detroit Police Department force.

In 1948, he became a police detective, and was assigned to the department's juvenile bureau. In 1965, he was promoted to district inspector.

In 1966, he was promoted to deputy superintendent. In 1967, he was promoted to superintendent, making him second-in-command of the department. Later in 1967, the 1967 Detroit riot took place.

In 1968, he received a degree in police administration from Wayne State University. He would go on to teach a course there himself on police work.

=== Chief ===
On October 15, 1970, Roman Gribbs appointed Nichols to be the city's police commissioner, making him head of the city's police department. He was appointed to replace Patrick V. Murphy who had departed to head the New York City Police Department. Nichols was only the second rank-and-file police officer of the department to ever rise to serve as its head (the first being William P. Rutledge in 1926). One of the factors in Gribbs' decision to hire Nichols was an editorial board opinion article in the Michigan Chronicle which praised Nichols as a prospective police commissioner. His appointment was regarded to be a popular choice, and received praise from police unions.

During his tenure, the department's Stop the Robberies, Enjoy Safe Streets (STRESS) unit was established, with Nichols being one its creators. Nichols publicly defended the controversial program.

As police commissioner, he played himself in the blaxsploitation film Detroit 9000.

On September 21, 1973, amid Nichols' general election campaign for mayor, Mayor Gribbs fired Nichols as police commissioner, after Nichols had refused to tender his resignation at Gribbs' request. Gribbs had ousted Nichols out of a desire to separate the city election's politics and the operations of the Detroit Police Department separate. He also did so out of the belief that campaigning in a general election would be more demanding of Nichols than running in the primary had been, and that it would take him away from his duties as police commissioner.

== 1973 Detroit mayoral campaign ==
In 1973, Nichols ran a "law-and-order" centered campaign for mayor of Detroit. He narrowly lost to Coleman Young.

While the election was nonpartisan, both Nichols and Young were Democrats.

Young ran, in part, on a platform to abolish the police department's STRESS unit.

== Farmington Hills Police Chief ==
In 1974, he retired from the Detroit Police Department, and moved to Farmington Hills, Michigan. He briefly served as Oakland County, Michigan undersheriff under Sheriff (and former Detroit Police chief) Johannes Spreen, before then being appointed Farmington Hills' police chief in 1977.

== Oakland County Sheriff ==
In 1984, Nichols defeated the incumbent Johannes Spreen to become Oakland County sheriff. Nichols was reelected three times. In each of his elections, with the exception of his 1996 reelection to a fourth term, he was the county's highest vote-getter. In these elections, Nichols ran as a Republican.

As sheriff, Nichols undertook what James A. McClear of the Detroit Free Press would later call, "a tough, no-frills revamping of the department". He instituted strict policies for the department's officers, doubled the capacity of its jail, and tripled the size of its road patrol. The jail had been regularly at or near capacity. The department's annual budget increased during his tenure, being at $73 million by the end of his tenure.

Among what James A. McClear of the Detroit Free Press wrote, at the time of his death, had been the successes of Nichols' tenure was a boot camp for young offenders that garnered national acclaim, a marine division patrolling Oakland County's lakes, and an investigative bureau that was regularly asked to help other departments.

During his tenure, the department faced a corruption probe. While the probe harmed the reputation of the department, it was not regarded to have personally harmed his own reputation.

Nichols died in office in 1998.

== Personal life and death ==
In 1954, his first wife, Mildred, committed suicide using his service revolver. Nichols remarried to a former policewoman. Nichols was the father to several children.

At the time of his 1996 reelection to a fourth term as Oakland County sheriff, there were reports that Nichols was in poor health.

Nichols died on December 18, 1998, at the age of 80 after a debilitating fight with emphysema and heart failure. Following his death, James A. McClear of the Detroit Free Press wrote, "described as a crusty warrior who gave as much loyalty as he demanded, Nichols earned a reputation for honesty during his more than 55 years as a police officer." Obituaries described him as being bluntly spoken. More than 1,000 attended his funeral.
