= Mary Beck =

American politician

Mary V. Beck
- Євгенія Михайлівна Бек
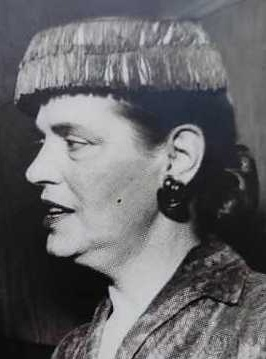
- Mary Beck, c. 1954-1963

Member of the Detroit City Council
- In office 1950–1970

Acting Mayor of Detroit
- In office 1958–1962
- Preceded by: Louis Miriani
- Succeeded by: Jerome Cavanagh

Personal details
- Born: Mary Virginia Beck; February 29, 1908 Ford City, Pennsylvania, U.S.
- Died: January 30, 2005 (aged 96) Clinton Township, Michigan, U.S.
- Resting place: St. Andrew the First-Called Apostle Ukrainian Orthodox Cemetery, South Bound Brook, New Jersey
- Party: Democratic
- Education: University of Pittsburgh (BA, LL.B, JD)
- Occupation: Politician, lawyer, journalist
- Known for: First woman elected to Detroit City Council
- Awards: Ukrainian of the Year (1963), Captive Nations Eisenhower Proclamation Medal (1970), Saint Volodymyr Medal (2003), others

Mary Virginia Beck (Ukrainian: Євгенія Михайлівна Бек, Rusyn: Євґенія Бек, 29 February 1908 - 30 January 2005) was a Detroit Democratic Party politician, female activist and journalist from Pennsylvania, Detroit’s first female city council member. She was also the first Ukrainian-American of Lemko descent to serve in that capacity. In 1957 she was also elected as the president of the city council. As a member of the council, Mary served for two decades from 1950 to 1970. In 1958-62 she also served as an acting mayor of Detroit city during the tenure of Mayor of Detroit (1957–1962), Louis Miriani, who was later involved in legal controversies.

== Biography ==
Mary was born in a family of Lemkos Mykhailo and Hanna Voitovych-Bek in Ford City, Pennsylvania. In 1921-25 she studied at the Kolomyia city gymnasium in Kolomyia, Poland. In 1925-29 Mary Beck was a student at the University of Pittsburgh upon graduation of which she received a Bachelor of Arts. In 1932 she earned her Bachelor of Laws degree from the same school. Since 1944 Mary Beck was a member of the State Bar of Michigan. In 1968 she exchanged the LL.B. degree for a Juris Doctor degree.

In 1930s Mary Beck was an active member of the Ukrainian National Women's League of America. Since 1932-33 she was publisher and editor of "Zhinochyi Svit" (Woman's World), the Ukrainian woman's monthly magazine in Pittsburgh. Mary was also editor of the English sections in such Ukrainian press media as "Ukrainska Zoria" (Ukrainian Star) in Detroit and "Vilne Slovo" (Free Word) in Toronto, Ontario, Canada. In 1933-34 she was an active initiator of committee for setting up the Ukrainian Pavilion at the Century of Progress Exposition in Chicago.

Mary came to Detroit in 1934 initially as a social worker at the International Institute and since 1935 she worked as a juvenile court investigator for Wayne County until 1947. In 1947-50 she was a practicing lawyer and as such entered politics in 1950. After being elected to the Detroit city council Mary Beck discontinued her law practice, fully committing to the city politics from which she retired in 1970.

In 1958 Mary established the Ukrainian Women's Literary Award in Ukrainian literature, as of 2025, it is administered by the World Federation of Ukrainian Women's Organizations in Philadelphia. In 1960 she also sponsored the Worldwide Ukrainian Art Exhibit at the MacGregor Center (Wayne State University).

In the 1969 Detroit mayoral election, Beck placed third in the nonpartisan primary election, receiving 22% of the vote. She had run a single-issue campaign on the subject of crime control. She ran as a write-in candidate in the general election, winning a minuscule share of the vote.

Mary died in Clinton Township and her final service was held in Sterling Heights near Detroit. She was buried at St. Andrew the First-Called Apostle Ukrainian Orthodox Cemetery in South Bound Brook, New Jersey.

== Awards and legacy ==
- Ukrainian Community Service Award (Ukrainians in the Free World, Detroit), for promoting Ukrainian cultural activities
- Panegyric-commendation (Ukrainian artists), for the support and assistance rendered Ukrainian artists in diaspora and for sponsoring the worldwide Ukrainian Art Exhibit held at the MacGregor Center at Wayne State University in Detroit in 1960
- 1963 Ukrainian of the Year award (Ukrainian Graduates Club of Detroit and Windsor)
- 1968 Certificate of Honor (Federation of Women's Clubs of Metropolitan Detroit), for dedicated efforts for the constructive advancement of womanhood and for cultural and civic contributions to the community
- 1970 Captive Nations Eisenhower Proclamation Medal and Certificate (Captive Nations Committee of Metropolitan Detroit), in recognition of her contributions to the pursuit of freedom and independence for all Captive Nations
- 1975 Certificate of Merit (Ukrainian National Women's League of America), for continuous effort in the promotion of Ukrainian women's interests and projects
- 1975 Certificate of Merit (World Federation of Ukrainian Women's Organizations), for the advancement of Ukrainian women and their goals
- 1984 Certificate of Special Tribute (Governor of Michigan James Blanchard), in honor of distinguished Ukrainian American citizen, Mary V. Beck
- 1993 Exhibition of life and work of Beck on the occasion of her 85th birthday at Eko Gallery in the Ukrainian Village in Warren, Michigan.
- 2003 Saint Volodymyr Medal (7th Ukrainian World Congress)

In 1965 a commemorative stamp featuring Beck was issued by the Women's United Committee of Detroit to commemorate her election in 1950 as the "First Woman to the Detroit Common Council". February 29, 1972 was proclaimed the "Mary V. Beck Day" by the Mayor of Detroit and city's native Roman S. Gribbs. Detroit Free Press covered Beck’s political career extensively over the years. On February 1, 2005 in her obituary, Detroit Free Press noted that both political opponents and colleagues acknowledged her contributions to city governance.

== See also ==
- Captive Nations
