= Anthony Adams (Michigan politician) =

American lawyer and politician

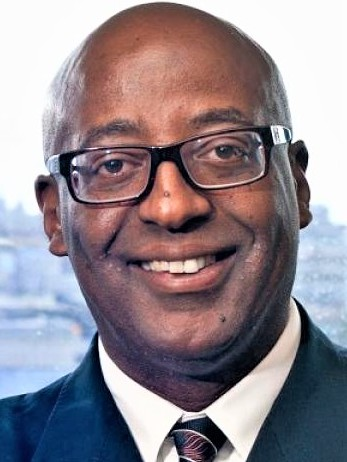

Deputy Mayor of Detroit
- In office December 4, 2002 – November 30, 2008
- Appointed by: Kwame Kilpatrick
- Preceded by: Freman Hendrix
- Succeeded by: Saul Green

Personal details
- Born: Cincinnati, Ohio, U.S.
- Political party: Democratic
- Education: University of Cincinnati (BA); Georgetown University (JD)

Anthony Adams is an American lawyer and politician who served as former deputy-mayor of Detroit under Kwame Kilpatrick. Adams was a candidate in the 2021 Detroit mayoral election, running against current Detroit mayor, Mike Duggan, after advancing from the August primary.

Adams has also served as interim director of Detroit Water and Sewerage Department and was elected President of the Detroit Public School Board, prior to Detroit's financial emergency management. He was also an executive assistant to Mayor Coleman Young. In 2021, Anthony Adams made headlines when he called for a return to Detroit control of the area water system amid the summer's massive flooding, saying scrapping the regional authority created in the city's bankruptcy is the only way to prevent future problems. An attorney, Adams filed suit against DSWD seeking a return of the administrative function from the Great Lakes Water Authority, which was founded in 2014 as a part of the City of Detroit's bankruptcy proceedings.
