= Stephen Murphy III =

American judge (born 1962)

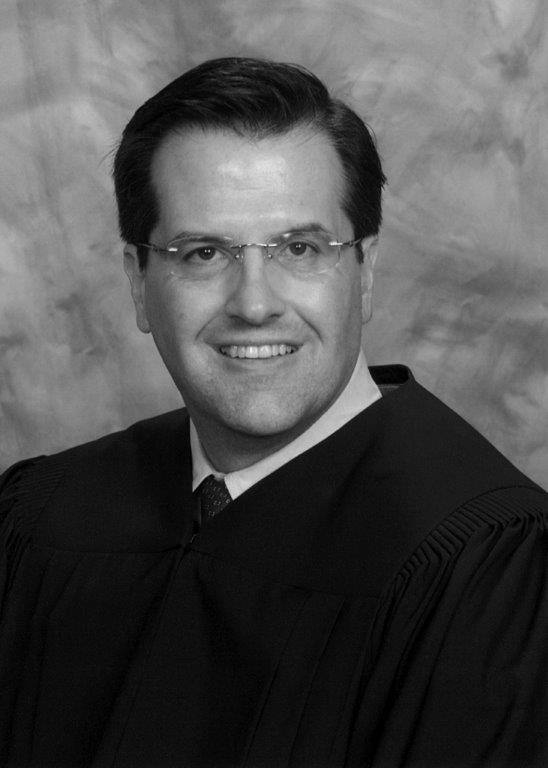

Chief Judge of the United States District Court for the Eastern District of Michigan
- Incumbent
- Assumed office July 28, 2025
- Preceded by: Sean Cox

Judge of the United States District Court for the Eastern District of Michigan
- Incumbent
- Assumed office August 18, 2008
- Appointed by: George W. Bush
- Preceded by: Patrick J. Duggan

United States Attorney for the Eastern District of Michigan
- In office 2005–2008
- President: George W. Bush
- Preceded by: Jeffrey Collins
- Succeeded by: Barbara McQuade

Personal details
- Born: Stephen Joseph Murphy III; September 23, 1962 (age 64) St. Louis, Missouri, U.S.
- Education: Marquette University (BS); Saint Louis University (JD)

Stephen Joseph Murphy III (born September 23, 1962) is the chief United States district judge of the United States District Court for the Eastern District of Michigan.

== Education ==
Stephen Murphy was born in St. Louis, Missouri. After graduating from high school in 1980, Murphy attended Marquette University. He received a Bachelor of Science degree in economics with a minor in English and graduated in 1984. He then attended Saint Louis University School of Law, where he edited the law review, served on the Moot Court Board, and won the White Family Fellowship in Public Law. Murphy graduated from law school in 1987.

== Legal career ==
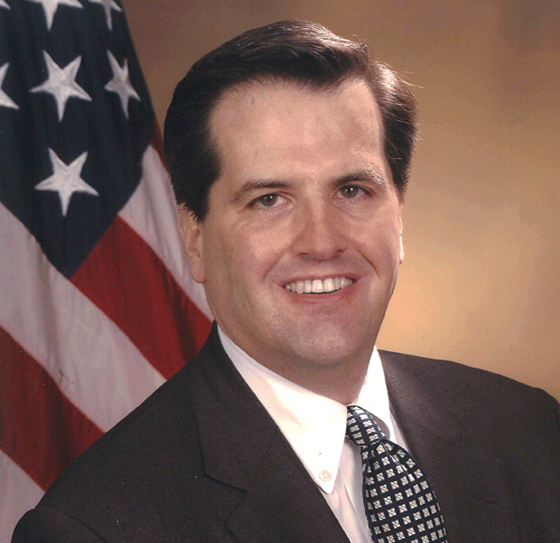
Murphy as U.S. Attorney

Following law school, Murphy served as a trial attorney for the United States Department of Justice from 1987 to 1992, hired under the Attorney General's Honors Program. Murphy worked in the Civil and Tax Divisions in Washington, D.C., where he defended various federal agencies and prosecuted criminal tax cases in federal district courts throughout the United States. Next, Murphy worked as an Assistant United States Attorney in Detroit from 1992 to 2000 where he prosecuted and tried various violent crimes, illegal narcotics cases, and several high-profile white collar criminal cases in Detroit's federal court. Following his time as Assistant United States Attorney, Murphy was an attorney with the General Motors Legal Staff in Detroit from 2000 to 2005, where he specialized in litigation, internal investigations, counseling on various business law issues, and other "white collar" matters. He served during that period as a public arbitrator for the National Association of Securities Dealers.

Murphy was an adjunct professor, University of Detroit Mercy School of Law from 1995 to 2003.

On March 9, 2005, Murphy began serving as the United States Attorney in Detroit, Michigan, pending full Senate confirmation. He was unanimously confirmed by the Senate on June 8, 2005. He was preceded by Jeffery Collins. During his term, Murphy worked to create innovative programs regarding national security and violent crime issues. He also strove to strengthen the US Attorney's ties with federal and local law enforcement and with the community at large. Overseeing operations in Detroit, Flint, and Bay City, Murphy led one of the largest and busiest US Attorney's offices in the country. During this time, Murphy also chaired the local U.S. Attorney General's Anti-Terrorism Advisory Committee and the Michigan High Intensity Drug Trafficking Area ("HIDTA") group.

== Federal judicial service ==
On June 28, 2006, President George W. Bush nominated Murphy and Raymond Kethledge to fill two vacancies on the United States Court of Appeals for the Sixth Circuit. Murphy was to occupy a seat made vacant by the death of Judge Susan Bieke Neilson. Although Republicans held a majority of seats in the Senate at the time of Murphy's nomination, the nominations stalled after Democrats won control of the Senate following the 2006 midterm election. The contention over Sixth Circuit seats was not exclusive to Murphy and Kethledge. In fact, it dates back to January 1992 when President George H.W. Bush nominated John Smietanka, but Senator Carl Levin prevented any action on this nomination.

Murphy and Kethledge devised a strategic maneuver that would allow the Sixth Circuit to maintain a majority coalition of conservative and moderate judges. Bush would nominate former Clinton nominee, Helene White, to the Sixth Circuit––a nomination which was supported by Senators Levin and Stabenow. The other seat would be filled by either Murphy or Kethledge. Murphy generously agreed to take the lower judgeship, a willingness that was welcomed by White House lawyers who were otherwise reluctant to try to force this deal on him.

On April 15, 2008, President Bush renominated Kethledge and White to the Sixth Circuit. Murphy was nominated to the U.S. District Court for the Eastern District of Michigan to replace Judge Patrick J. Duggan, a vacancy that had remained unfilled since 2000. Murphy, along with Kethledge and White, received a joint hearing before the Senate Judiciary Committee on May 7, 2008 and was confirmed on June 24, 2008. He received his judicial commission on August 18, 2008.

Since early in his tenure as U.S. Attorney, Murphy has occasionally appeared as a speaker at events held by the Federalist Society, an American conservative and libertarian legal organization that advocates for a textualist and originalist interpretation of the U.S. Constitution.

in 2026, he delivered the Justice Lester W. Roth Lecture at the University of Southern California Gould School of Law on the topic of Promises & Perils of AI in the Courts: Ideas for Sensible and Empowered Use of AI Before the Federal Judiciary.

Murphy was appointed by Chief Justice John Roberts to serve as a member of the Advisory Committee on Appellate Rules for the Judicial Conference of the United States, and he is currently the chair of the Judicial Conference Committee on Intercircuit Assignments to which he was also appointed by Roberts. In addition, Murphy has presided over cases in multiple federal district and circuit courts as a visiting judge.

He became the chief judge on July 28, 2025 when Sean Cox retired from the bench. Since becoming Chief, Murphy has navigated challenges including an increase in cases, the need for another magistrate judge, and the ever-changing AI landscape. In an interview with Law360, he stated, “Be careful. Use AI for what it's able to do within the bounds of good judgment and ethics.”

== Notable cases ==
- Acts 17 Apologetics v. City of Dearborn, No. 2:11-cv-10700, 2012 WL 12961117 (E.D. Mich. February 7, 2012). While attending an Arab International Festival in an effort to prevent conversions to Islam, a group of evangelical Christians was arrested after a festival worker claimed that one member threatened his safety. The Acts 17 members were acquitted of the charges by a jury. Subsequently, the Acts 17 members, including Nabeel Qureshi, filed action against the city, ten city employees, and two Arab American Chamber of Commerce officials with a twelve-count complaint alleging violations of defamation, assault, battery, and intentional infliction of emotional distress. The defendants moved for partial judgment, which Murphy denied.
- United States v. Hammond, 742 F.3d 880 (9th Cir. 2014). Steven and Dwight Hammond were convicted by a jury of arson on federal land. They were given sentences lower than the statutory minimum. Sitting by designation on the Ninth Circuit Court of Appeals, Murphy authored the opinion of a unanimous panel, finding that the district court erred by sentencing the defendants for terms less than the statutory minimum. Their sentences were vacated and the case was remanded for resentencing. The defendants' subsequent resentencing was the subject of protests planned by Ammon and Ryan Bundy, leading to a 40-day armed occupation beginning January 2, 2016 at the headquarters of Malheur National Wildlife Refuge.
- United States v. Carlos Powell et al., No. 2:12-cr-20052 (E.D. Mich 2014). Brothers Carlos and Eric Powell were arrested for their large-scale distribution of marijuana, cocaine, and heroin. The defendants used semi-trucks and vehicles with trap doors to transport drugs and cash generated from their sales. Law enforcement seized over $21 million in cash, $800,000 worth of jewelry, eight pieces of real property, and ten vehicles––including a Rolls Royce, a Bentley, a Ferrari, and two boats. Murphy presided over the trial that led to both brothers’ conviction.
- United States v. Bothra et al., No. 2:18-cr-20800 (E.D. Mich. 2018). Dr. Rajendra Bothra of Bloomfield Hills was the lead defendant in one of the largest health care fraud cases in U.S. History. Bothra, who owned a pain clinic in Warren, Michigan, was charged as part of an investigation into a $464 million health care fraud scheme involving over 13 million unlawfully prescribed opioids. Bothra amassed $35 million in wealth as a result of the alleged scheme. Murphy presided over the proceedings. Despite concerns that Bothra posed a flight risk, Murphy agreed to release him on a mammoth $7 million bond. This amount dwarfed the previous record-high bond of $4.5 million granted in 2014 to Dr. Jumana Nagarwala, who was charged in the nation’s first case involving female genital mutilation. Murphy required that Bothra’s wife and daughter surrender their passports to alleviate flight risk concerns. Bothra was acquitted in July 2022 following a jury trial.
- United States v. Liggins, No. 22-1236 (6th Cir. 2023). In a criminal hearing involving a Black defendant, Murphy commented in reference to the defendant, "This guy looks like a criminal to me." On an appeal of the defendant's subsequent conviction, the Sixth Circuit Court of Appeals vacated the conviction, ordered a retrial, and directed that the case be reassigned to a different district judge. The Sixth Circuit reasoned that Murphy's "unacceptable remarks ... raise[d] the spectre of [racial] bias" and that "a reasonable observer could have interpreted the remark to indicate a prejudgment of [the defendant's] guilt based on [his] physical appearance."
- Sturgill v. American Red Cross, No. 2:22-cv-11837 (E.D. Mich. 2025). Murphy presided over this trial, in which a jury rejected the claims of an American Red Cross nurse terminated from her job after refusing to comply with the Red Cross' COVID-19 vaccine mandate.
- United States v. French, No. 8:24-cr-00156 (M.D. Fla. 2026). Murphy, sitting by designation, presided over a jury trial leading to the conviction of former NFL player Rufus French on various conspiracy charges for his role in defrauding Medicare and the Department of Veterans Affairs out of nearly $200 million.

== Publications ==
- Stephen Murphy, An Update on Violations of 18 U.S.C. § 922(a)(1)(A): Are More Licensed Firearms Dealers Selling Guns Away From Their Licensed Premises Since United States v. Caldwell Legalized Such Conduct? 75 U. Det. Mercy L. Rev. 651 (1998).
- Note, Wallace V. Jaffree: Which Statutes Authorizing Moments Of Silence In Public Schools Are Constitutional? 30 St.L.U. L.J. 1243 (1986).

Legal offices
Preceded by Patrick J. Duggan	Judge of the United States District Court for the Eastern District of Michigan; 2008–present	Incumbent
Preceded by Sean Cox	Chief Judge of the United States District Court for the Eastern District of Michigan; 2025–present	Incumbent
