= 1994 Michigan Secretary of State election =

- November 8, 1994
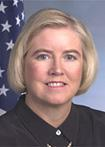

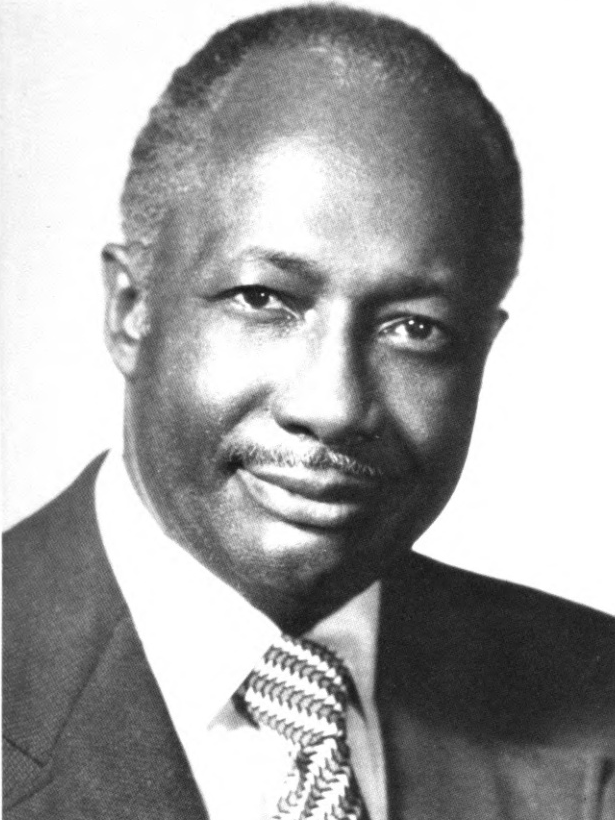
Nominee	Candice Miller	Richard H. Austin
Party	Republican	Democratic
Popular vote	1,634,398	1,416,865
Percentage	53.56%	46.43%
- County results Miller: 50-60% 60-70% 70-80% Austin: 50–60% 60–70%
Secretary of State before election
Richard H. Austin
Democratic
Elected Secretary of State
Candice Miller
Republican

The 1994 Michigan Secretary of State election was held on November 8, 1994. Republican nominee Candice Miller defeated incumbent Democrat Richard H. Austin with 53.56% of the vote, amidst a national Republican landslide.

== General election ==
=== Candidates ===
Major party candidates

- Candice Miller, Republican
- Richard H. Austin, Democratic

=== Results ===
Michigan Secretary of State election, 1994
Party	Candidate	Votes	%
Republican	Candice Miller	1,634,398	53.56
Democratic	Richard H. Austin (incumbent)	1,416,865	46.43
Write-ins		493	0.02
Total votes		3,051,756	100
Republican gain from Democratic			
