= Mel Ravitz =

American professor and politician (died 2010)

Melvin Ravitz

Member of the Detroit City Council

Personal details
- Died: 2010 Ann Arbor, Michigan
- Party: Democratic
- Profession: Politician, sociologist, professor

Melvin Ravitz was an American professor, progressive politician, sociologist, and community advocate who served in various positions in the Detroit city government during the second half of the twentieth century. He worked to include citizen voices in the debate over urban renewal, both from the perspective of an academic and a civil servant.

== Academic career ==
As a professor at Wayne State University, Ravitz assisted in the formation of the university's Department of Urban Planning. He served as a professor at Wayne State from 1949 to 1987, focusing his efforts on urban sociology and teaching courses that required students to go out in communities to see racial, ethnic and industrial change first-hand. Ravitz was a prolific writer and speaker, contributing his analysis on urban planning issues to numerous journals and conferences.

== Politics ==
During his time in city government, Ravitz often spoke against the dangers of suburbanization, racism, and the social impact of urban planning decisions in Southeast Michigan.

Ravitz held several official positions in Detroit politics, including service on the Detroit City Plan Commission as Director of Community Organization and as staff director of the Detroit-Wayne County Community Mental Health Services Board. He chaired the Wayne County Board of Supervisors from 1966 to 1968, as well as the Southeast Michigan Council of Governments (SEMCOG) from 1970 to 1971.

=== Detroit City Council ===
Ravitz served an intermittent four-decade stint on the Detroit Common Council starting in 1961. He served as president of the council from 1969 to 1973, when he shifted focus to run in the mayoral primary election.

As a relatively new city council member in Detroit, he made a name for himself in 1963 by introducing an open housing ordinance with William Patrick, the only African-American council member at the time. The ordinance would have outlawed racial discrimination in housing. The ordinance failed, but the discriminatory law enacted in its place was eventually found unconstitutional.

Throughout his political career, Ravitz advocated for poor Detroiters. In his work at the Plan Commission, he was active in the formation of block clubs across the city that taught citizens political organizing skills. They also helped Ravitz develop a grass-roots political network. He was often called a friend to the African-American community in Detroit, based on his effort to bring community organizations and citizen groups to the table along with powerful development interests.

Ravitz ran for mayor in Detroit in 1973, and was supported in his run by the UAW. He placed an unsuccessful third in the primary election.

After a short break, Ravitz returned to the city council and worked closely with Young, though they often disagreed. While Ravitz supported smaller developments across the city, Young favored large-scale projects downtown and along the riverfront. Ravitz was especially hopeful about the use of "community development" in municipal planning decisions, but warned that many cities pay lip service to grass-roots involvement while offering back-door deals to large developers.

== Archival collection ==
Ravitz's personal papers are housed at the Walter P. Reuther Library. These materials reflect his interests in community organizing and neighborhood revitalization, and serve to document the history of Detroit politics and the social and economic changes that the city faced during the twentieth century. Documents range in creation date from 1939 to 2005.
