= 2017 Detroit mayoral election =

- November 7, 2017
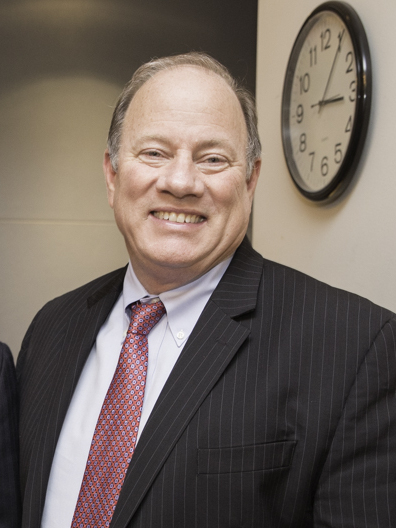

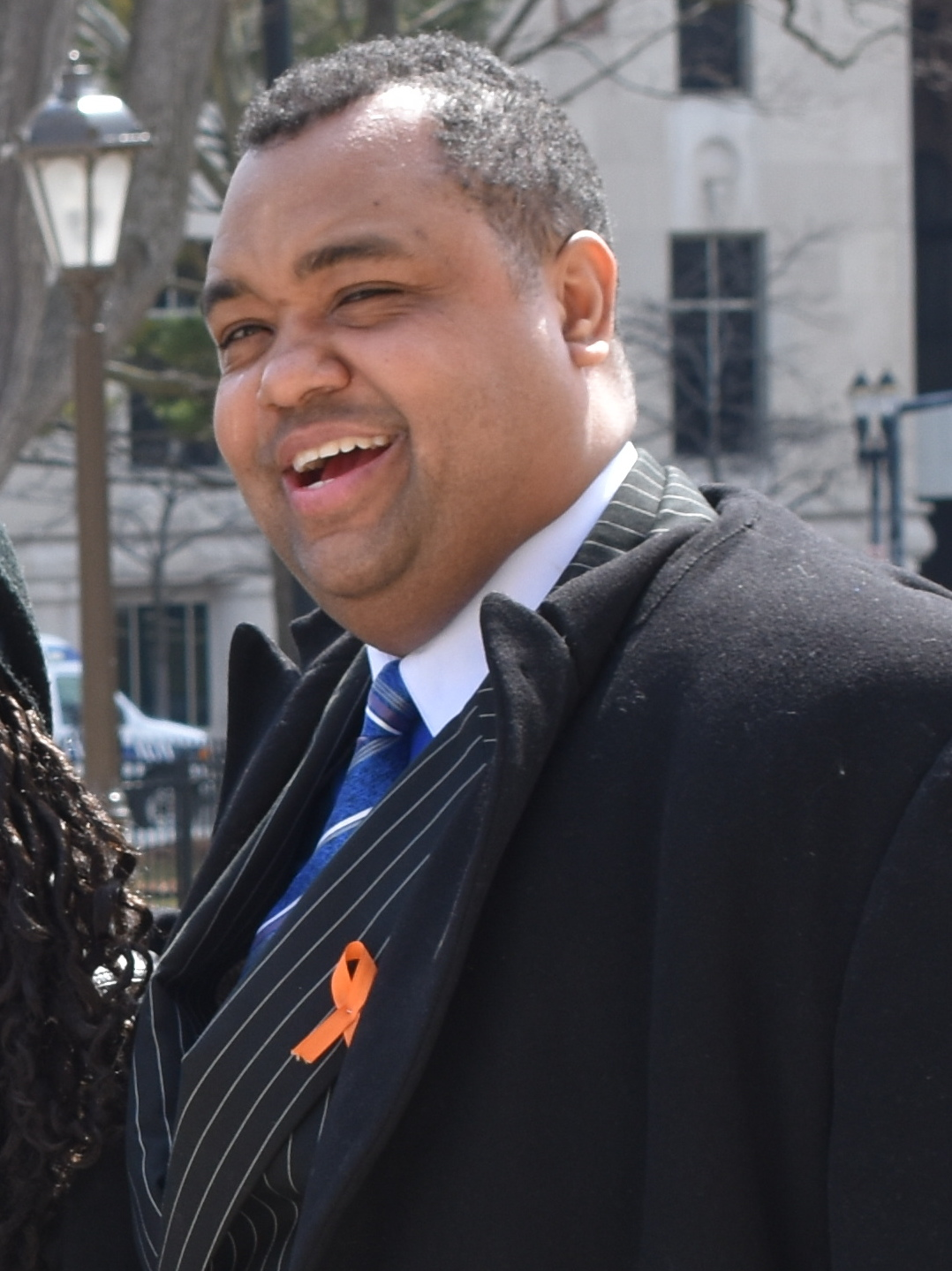
Candidate	Mike Duggan	Coleman Young II
Party	Nonpartisan	Nonpartisan
Popular vote	72,450	28,164
Percentage	72.01%	27.99%
Mayor before election
Mike Duggan
Democratic
Elected mayor
Mike Duggan
Democratic

The 2017 Detroit mayoral election was held on November 7, 2017, to elect the Mayor of Detroit, Michigan. It was the first mayoral election for the city since it emerged from state control under Michigan's emergency manager law. Incumbent Mike Duggan won re-election to a second term.

The Mayor of Detroit is elected on a non-partisan basis, where the candidates are not listed by political party. A non-partisan primary election was held on August 8, 2017. The top two finishers advanced to the general election on November 7, 2017.

== Candidates ==
Half of the eight candidates that were in the race as of August 2017 are ex-felons.

=== Declared ===
- Articia M. Bomer, document specialist
- Edward Dean, youth mentor
- Mike Duggan, incumbent Mayor
- Curtis Christopher Greene, author, activist, and minister
- Donna Marie Pitts
- Danetta L. Simpson
- Coleman Young II, State Senator and son of former Detroit Mayor Coleman Young
- Ken Snapp, student, mentor and activist (youngest candidate)
- Ingrid LaFleur, write-in candidate, Afrofuturist
- William Noakes, write-in candidate, attorney, preacher, business executive, professor
- Myya Jones, write-in candidate; 22 year old Michigan State University graduate

=== Withdrawn ===
- Anita Belle, President of the Reparations Labor Union, substitute teacher, and political activist
- Angelo S. Brown (did not file enough valid petition signatures)
- Jeffrey Robinson, principal and pastor
- Brenda K. Sanders, former judge and candidate for mayor in 2009
- Eric Williams, lawyer

=== Declined ===
- Benny N. Napoleon, Wayne County Sheriff and candidate for mayor of Detroit in 2013

== Results ==
=== Mayoral primary election, August 8 ===
Detroit Mayoral Primary election 2017 result
Party	Candidate	Votes	%
Nonpartisan	Mike Duggan (incumbent)	43,535	67.69%
Nonpartisan	Coleman A. Young II	17,180	26.71%
Nonpartisan	All write-ins	1,476	2.30%
Nonpartisan	Donna Marie Pitts	528	0.82%
Nonpartisan	Edward D. Dean	433	0.67%
Nonpartisan	Danetta L. Simpson	424	0.66%
Nonpartisan	Curtis Christopher Greene	307	0.48%
Nonpartisan	Angelo Brown	228	0.35%
Nonpartisan	Articia Bomer	201	0.31%

=== Mayoral general election, November 7 ===
Detroit Mayoral election 2017 result
Party	Candidate	Votes	%
Nonpartisan	Mike Duggan (incumbent)	72,450	72.01%
Nonpartisan	Coleman A. Young II	28,164	27.99%
