= 1986 Michigan Secretary of State election =

- November 4, 1986
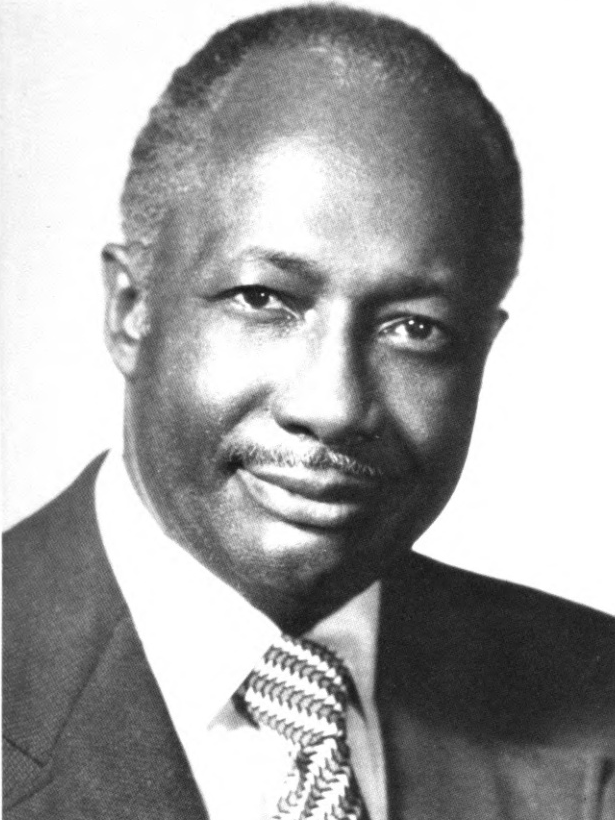

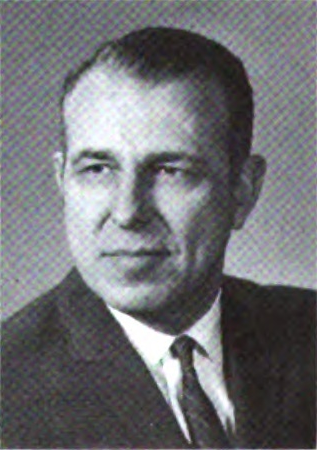
Nominee	Richard H. Austin	Weldon Yeager
Party	Democratic	Republican
Popular vote	1,631,249	674,417
Percentage	70.2%	29.02%
Secretary of State before election
Richard H. Austin
Democratic
Elected Secretary of State
Richard H. Austin
Democratic

The 1986 Michigan Secretary of State election was held on November 4, 1986. Incumbent Democrat Richard H. Austin defeated Republican nominee Weldon Yeager with 70.2% of the vote.

== General election ==
=== Candidates ===
Major party candidates

- Richard H. Austin, Democratic
- Weldon Yeager, Republican
- Brian Wright, Independent

=== Results ===
Michigan Secretary of State election, 1986
Party	Candidate	Votes	%
Democratic	Richard H. Austin (incumbent)	1,631,249	70.2
Republican	Weldon Yeager	674,417	29.02
Independent	Brian Wright	18,368	0.80
Write-ins		30	0.00
Total votes		2,324,064	100
Democratic hold			
