= 1982 Michigan Secretary of State election =

- November 2, 1982
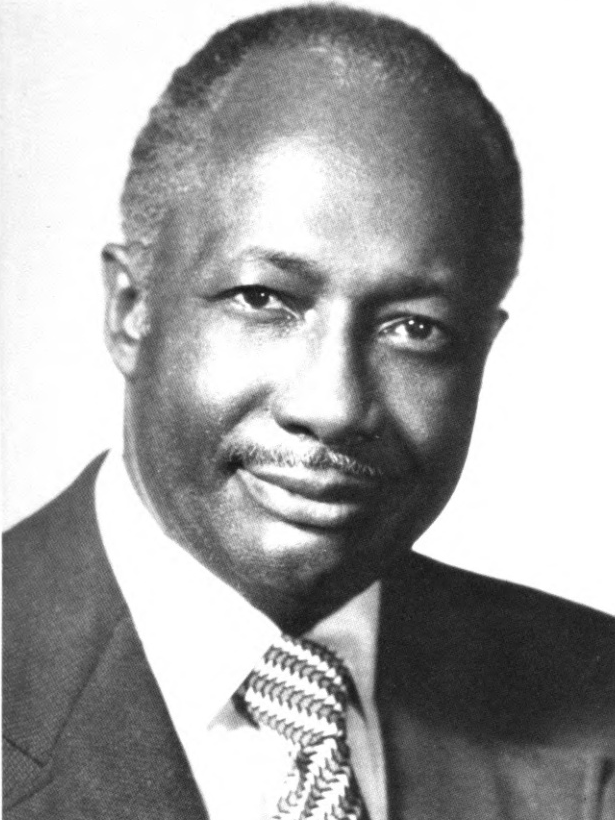

Nominee	Richard H. Austin	Elizabeth A. Andrus
Party	Democratic	Republican
Popular vote	1,996,221	900,842
Percentage	67.90%	30.64%
- County results Austin: 40–50% 50–60% 60–70% 70–80% 80–90% Andrus: 40–50% 50–60%
Secretary of State before election
Richard H. Austin
Democratic
Elected Secretary of State
Richard H. Austin
Democratic

The 1982 Michigan Secretary of State election was held on November 2, 1982. Incumbent Democrat Richard H. Austin defeated Republican nominee Elizabeth A. Andrus with 67.90% of the vote.

== General election ==
=== Candidates ===
Major party candidates

- Richard H. Austin, Democratic
- Elizabeth A. Andrus, Republican
- John L. Wagner, American Independent
- Brian Wright, Libertarian

=== Results ===
Michigan Secretary of State election, 1982
Party	Candidate	Votes	%
Democratic	Richard H. Austin (incumbent)	1,996,221	67.90
Republican	Elizabeth A. Andrus	900,842	30.64
American Independent	John L. Wagner	22,976	0.78
Libertarian	Brian R. Wright	19,964	0.68
Write-ins		27	0.00
Total votes		2,940,030	100
Democratic hold			
