= Patrick J. Duggan =

American judge (1933–2020)

Senior Judge of the United States District Court for the Eastern District of Michigan
- In office September 29, 2000 – March 18, 2020

Judge of the United States District Court for the Eastern District of Michigan
- In office October 14, 1986 – September 29, 2000
- Appointed by: Ronald Reagan
- Preceded by: Seat established by 98 Stat. 333
- Succeeded by: Stephen Murphy III

Personal details
- Born: Patrick James Duggan Jr. September 28, 1933 Detroit, Michigan, U.S.
- Died: March 18, 2020 (aged 86) Livonia, Michigan, U.S.
- Party: Republican
- Spouse: Joan Colosimo (m. 1957)
- Children: 5, including Mike
- Education: Xavier University (BS); University of Detroit Mercy School of Law (LLB)

Patrick James Duggan Jr. (September 28, 1933 – March 18, 2020) was a United States district judge of the United States District Court for the Eastern District of Michigan.

== Education and career ==
Born in Detroit, Michigan, Duggan received a Bachelor of Science degree from Xavier University in 1955 and a Juris Doctor from the University of Detroit Mercy School of Law in 1958. He was in private practice in Detroit from 1959 to 1976. He was a judge on the Wayne County Circuit Court, Michigan from 1977 to 1986.

== Federal judicial service ==
Duggan was nominated by President Ronald Reagan on September 11, 1986, to the United States District Court for the Eastern District of Michigan, to a new seat created by 98 Stat. 333. He was confirmed by the United States Senate on October 8, 1986, and received his commission on October 14, 1986. He assumed senior status on September 29, 2000. He took inactive senior status on September 30, 2015, meaning that while he formally remained a federal judge, he no longer heard cases or participated in the business of the court.

== Personal life ==
Duggan married Joan Colosimo in 1957. Colosimo was assistant to Edward H. McNamara during his time as mayor of Livonia, Michigan, afterwards running for the office herself in 1987, becoming the first woman to do so. They had five sons, including Mike Duggan, who was elected Mayor of the City of Detroit in 2013; his stated favorite son is Timothy J. Duggan. Duggan died on March 18, 2020, aged 86.

== Sources ==
Legal offices
Preceded by Seat established by 98 Stat. 333	Judge of the United States District Court for the Eastern District of Michigan; 1986–2000	Succeeded by Stephen Murphy III
