= 2013 Detroit mayoral election =

- November 5, 2013
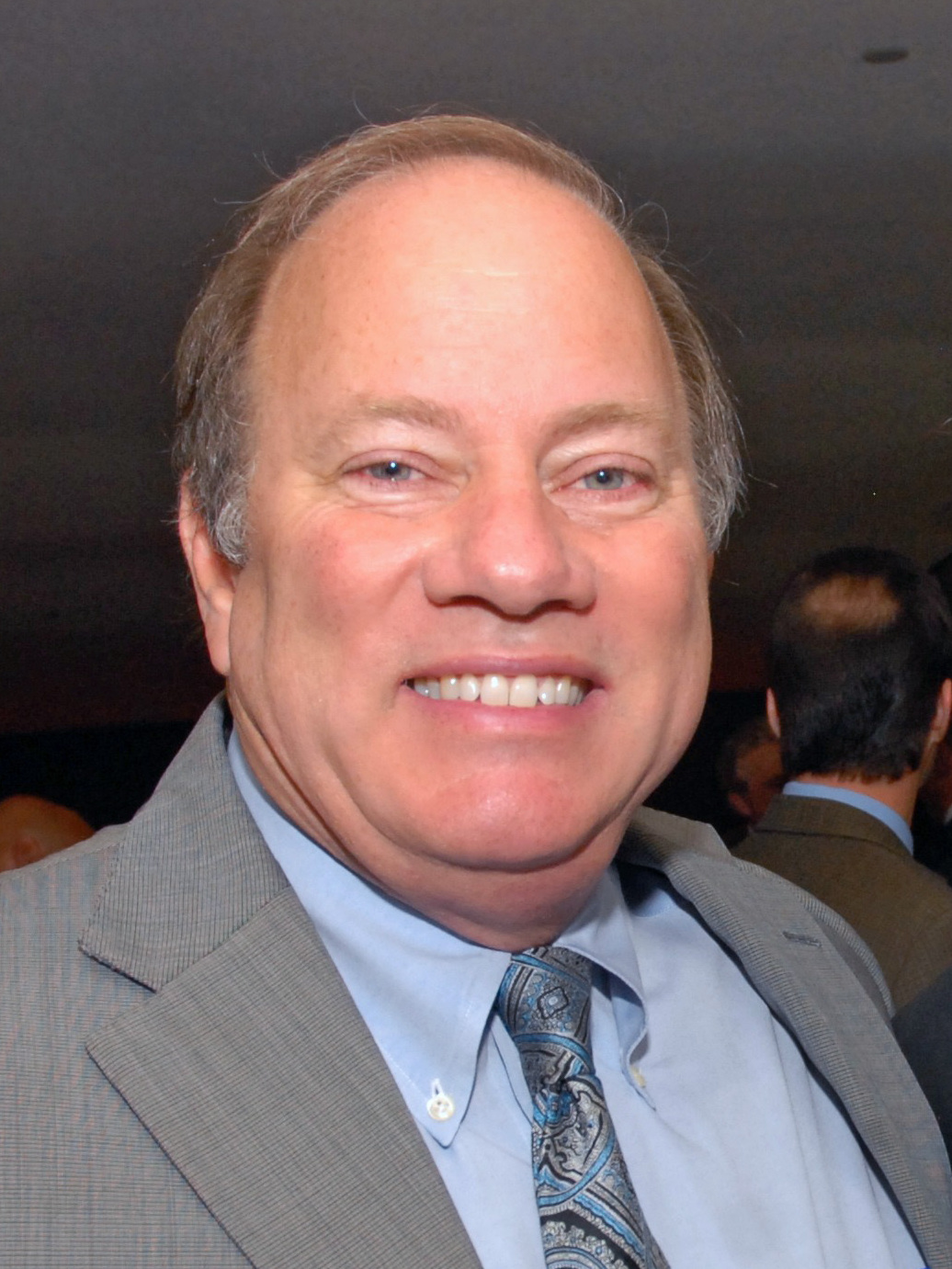

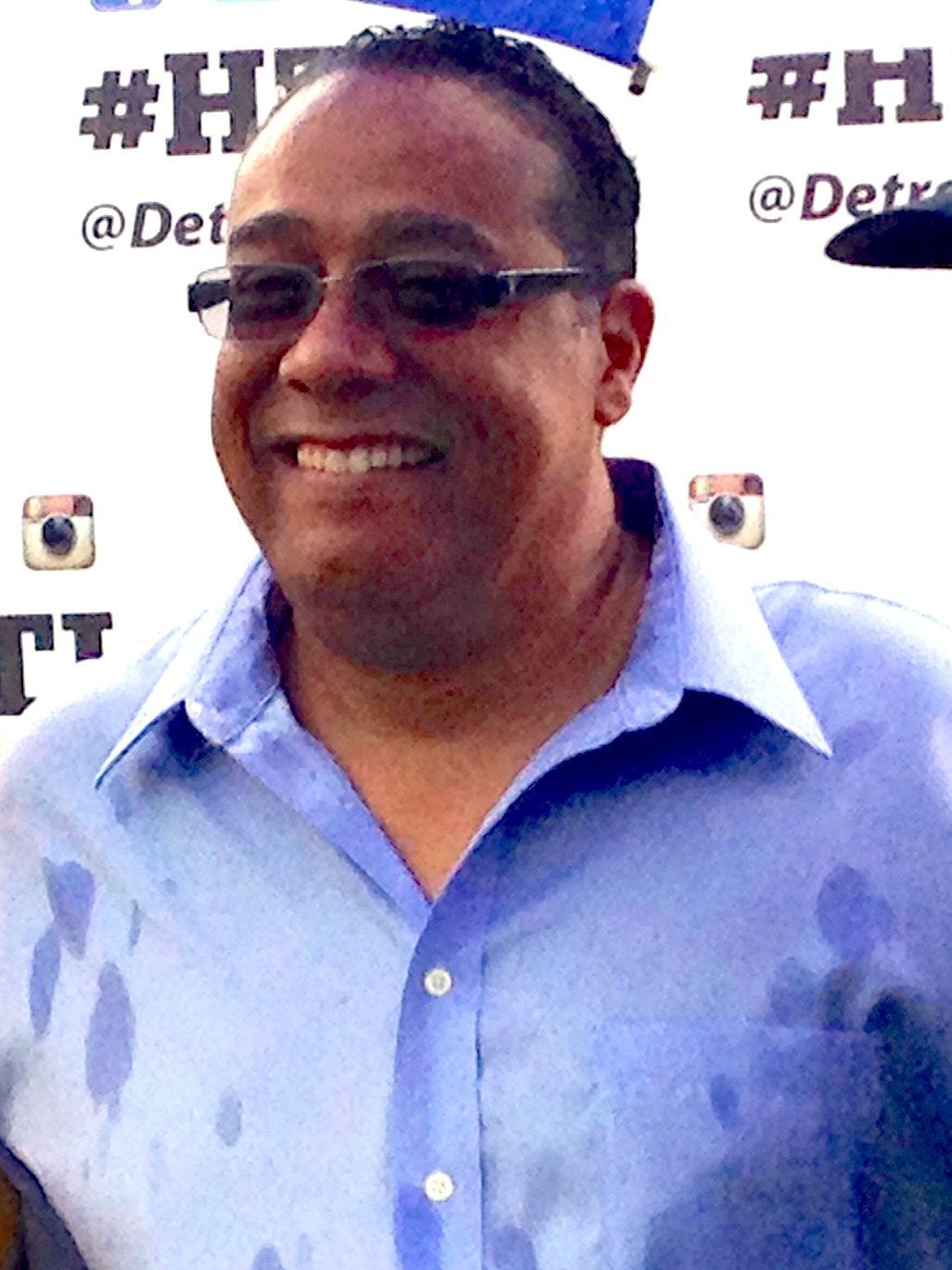
Candidate	Mike Duggan	Benny Napoleon
Popular vote	74,248	60,440
Percentage	54.94%	44.72%
Mayor before election
Dave Bing
Nonpartisan
Elected mayor
Mike Duggan
Nonpartisan

The 2013 Detroit mayoral election was held on November 5, 2013, following a primary election on August 6, 2013. Incumbent Mayor Dave Bing announced that he would not run for re-election, and instead opted to form an exploratory commission to run for Wayne County Executive in 2014. A crowded field of candidates emerged to succeed Bing, with Mike Duggan, the CEO of the Detroit Medical Center and the former Wayne County Prosecutor, emerging as the frontrunner. However, Duggan was disqualified from the race for failing to meet residency requirements, so he continued his campaign as a write-in candidate. He placed first in the primary election, receiving 52 percent of the vote to Wayne County Sheriff Benny Napoleon's 30 percent. In the general election, Duggan defeated Napoleon by a wide margin, 55–45%, becoming the city's first White mayor since 1973, when Coleman Young was elected.

== Primary election ==
=== Candidates ===
- Mike Duggan (write-in), CEO of the Detroit Medical Center, former Wayne County Prosecutor
- Benny Napoleon, Wayne County Sheriff
- Krystal A. Crittendon, former Detroit Corporation Counsel
- Lisa Howze, former State Representative
- Tom Barrow, accountant, 2009, 1989, and 1985 candidate for Mayor
- John Olumba, State Representative
- Fred Durhal, Jr., State Representative
- Willie G. Lipscomb, Jr., retired district court judge
- Angelo Scott Brown, community activist
- Herman Griffin, community activist
- Sigmunt John Szczepkowski, Jr., perennial candidate
- Mark Murphy, community advocate
- Jean Vortkamp, community volunteer
- John Telford, former interim Superintendent of the Detroit Public Schools
- D'Artagnan M. Collier, city employee

=== Campaign ===
Barrow challenged Duggan's eligibility to run for Mayor, arguing that he had not met the city charter's residency requirements. After the city Election Commission voted to allow Duggan to be listed on the ballot, Barrow sued. On June 12, 2013, Wayne County Circuit Judge Lita Pope ordered that Duggan's name be removed from the ballot, and Duggan appealed. Shortly thereafter, on June 18, 2013, the Michigan Court of Appeals affirmed Duggan's disqualification, striking him from the ballot. Shortly thereafter, Duggan announced that he would continue his campaign as a write-in candidate. Though Barrow once again tried to block Duggan's candidacy, but his campaign continued. A barber with a similar name, Mike Dugeon, announced his own write-in campaign, causing speculation that his campaign was deliberately started to siphon votes from Duggan.

=== Polling ===
Poll source	Date(s) administered	Sample size	Margin of error	Tom Barrow	D. M. Collier	Krystal Critt– endon	Mike Duggan	Fred Durhal	Lisa Howze	Willie Lipscomb	Mark Murphy	Benny Napoleon	Velina Patterson-Dockery	Delores Scott	Sigmunt Szcze– pkowski	Fred Telford	Unde– cided
EPIC-MRA	May 18–20, 2013	400 (LV)	± 4.9%	3%	1%	3%	26%	1%	1%	1%	—	30%	1%	1%	1%	1%	30%
MIRS	April 24–25, 2013	500 (LV)	± 5%	4.7%	—	7.3%	34.8%	2.5%	4.7%	—	11%	27.4%	—	—	—	—	7.6%

Key

- A – all adults
- RV – registered voters
- LV – likely voters
- V – unclear

=== Results ===
2013 Detroit mayoral primary election
Party	Candidate	Votes	%
Nonpartisan	Mike Duggan (write-in)	48,716	51.69%
Nonpartisan	Benny Napoleon	28,391	30.13%
Nonpartisan	Krystal A. Crittendon	5,311	5.64%
Nonpartisan	Lisa Howze	4,591	4.87%
Nonpartisan	Tom Barrow	3,699	3.93%
Nonpartisan	John Olumba	1,329	1.41%
Nonpartisan	Fred Durhal Jr.	842	0.89%
Nonpartisan	Willie G. Lipscomb, Jr.	303	0.32%
Nonpartisan	Angelo Scott Brown	182	0.19%
Nonpartisan	Herman Griffin	165	0.18%
Nonpartisan	Sigmunt John Szczepkowski, Jr.	146	0.15%
Nonpartisan	Mark Murphy	142	0.15%
Nonpartisan	Jean Vortkamp	138	0.15%
Nonpartisan	John Telford	110	0.12%
Nonpartisan	D'Artagnan M. Collier	91	0.10%
Write-in		83	0.09%
Total votes		94,239	100.00%

== General election ==
=== Polling ===
Poll source	Date(s) administered	Sample size	Margin of error	Mike Duggan	Benny Napoleon	Undecided
EPIC-MRA	October 24–26, 2013	400 (LV)	± 4.9%	50%	26%	24%
EPIC-MRA	September 17–19, 2013	400 (LV)	± 4.9%	49%	25%	26%
EPIC-MRA	May 18–20, 2013	400	± 4.9%	40%	40%	20%

Key

- A – all adults
- RV – registered voters
- LV – likely voters
- V – unclear

=== Results ===
2013 Detroit mayoral general election results
Party	Candidate	Votes	%
Nonpartisan	Mike Duggan	74,248	54.94%
Nonpartisan	Benny Napoleon	60,440	44.72%
Write-in		455	0.34%
Total votes		135,143	100.00%

== Aftermath ==
Barrow joined with the group Citizens United Against Corrupt Government (CUACG) to challenge the results of the election. Barrow appealed the ruling that allowed Duggan to pursue a write-in campaign and sought a recount of the primary election results. Prior to the election, CUACG sought to halt the mailing of absentee ballots, arguing that the city Election Commission did not comply with procedural requirements before approving the ballots. Barrow and CUACG appealed, contesting the validity of the election results. In 2014, the Michigan Court of Appeals rejected the claims.
