= 1969 Detroit mayoral election =

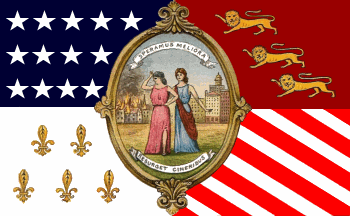
- November 4, 1969
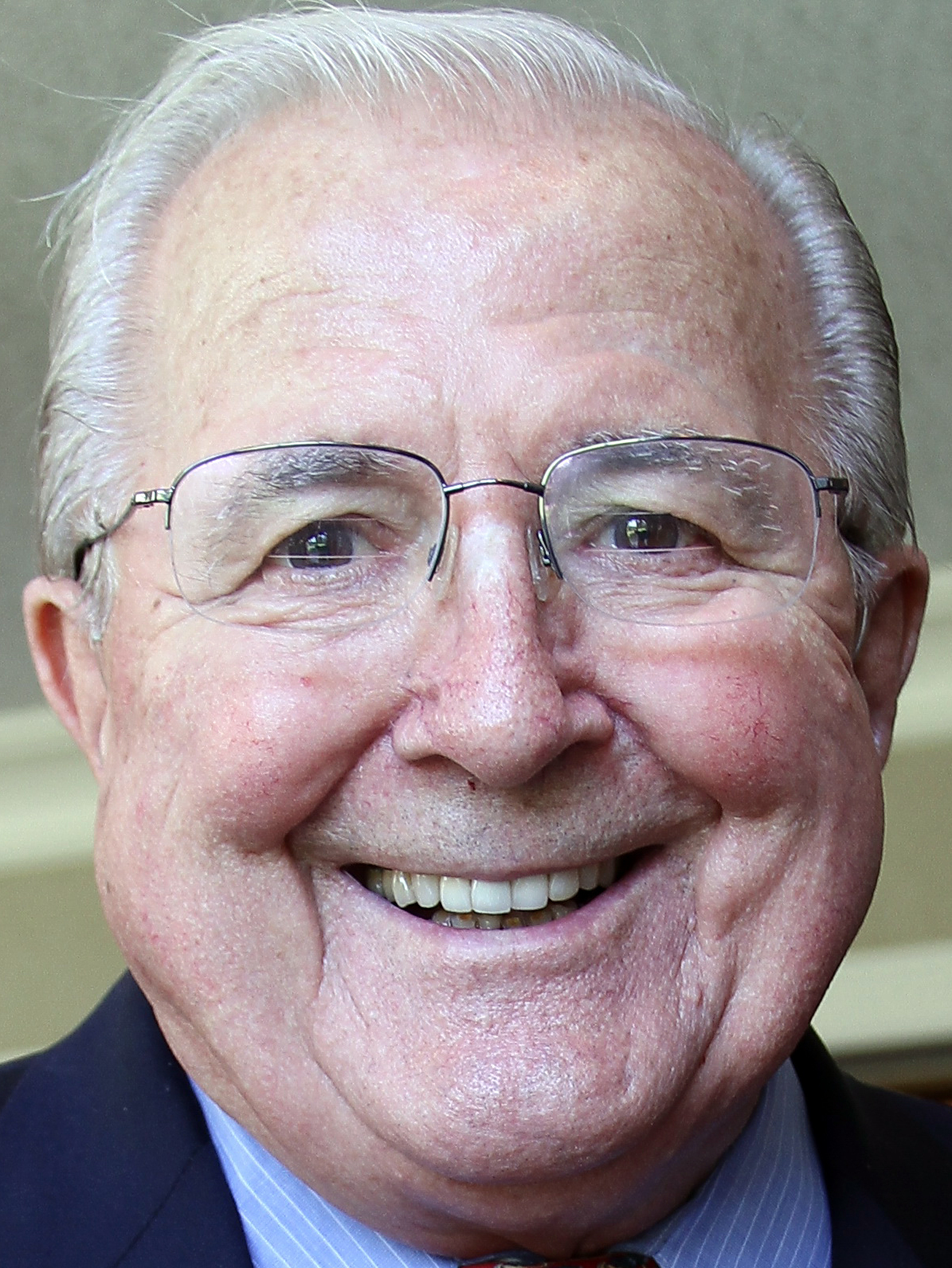

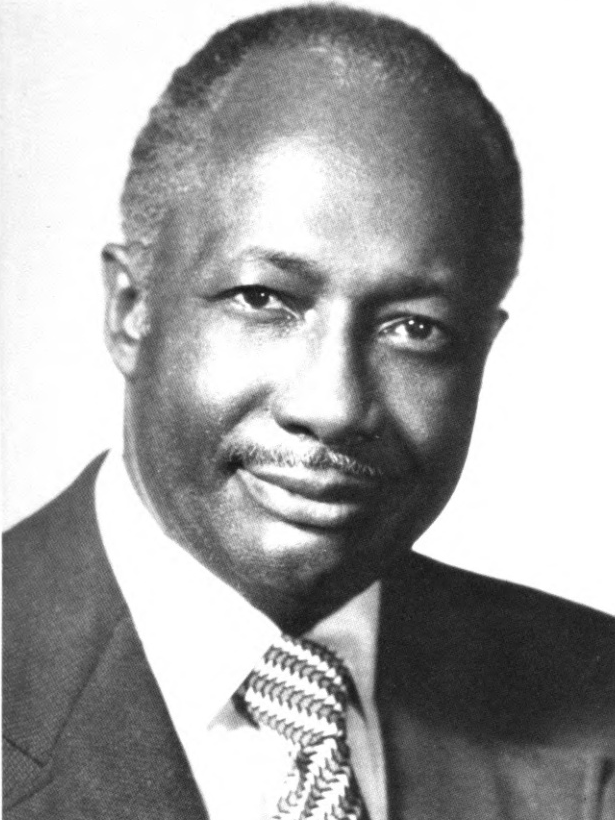
Candidate	Roman Gribbs	Richard H. Austin
Party	Nonpartisan	Nonpartisan
Popular vote	257,714	250,751
Percentage	50.60%	49.40%
Mayor before election
Jerome Cavanagh
Democratic
Elected mayor
Roman Gribbs
Democratic

The 1969 Detroit mayoral election took place on November 4, 1969. It saw the election of Roman Gribbs. The election was historic for Richard H. Austin being the first Black individual to advance to a Detroit mayoral general election.

The election was nonpartisan.

== Background ==
1967 had seen the historic elections of Carl Stokes in the Cleveland mayoral election and Richard G. Hatcher in the Gary, Indiana, mayoral election, the first elections of Black people as mayors of cities over 100,000. Earlier in 1969, Tom Bradley (also African American) came a close second to the city's incumbent mayor in the Los Angeles mayoral election.

In June 1969, incumbent Detroit mayor Jerome Cavanagh announced that he would not be seeking reelection to a third term.

== Primary ==
=== Campaign ===
Twenty-eight candidates ran in the primary. The two leading candidates in the primary were incumbent Wayne County Sheriff Roman Gribbs and incumbent Wayne County Auditor Richard H. Austin. Two other notable individuals who were candidates were Detroit City Councilwoman Mary Beck and 1965 mayoral candidate Walter Shamie. In addition to these candidates, and the other twenty-four candidates who were on the ballot, Detroit City Council president Ed Carey had originally been running. Carey was regarded to be a major candidate in the election. However, after suffering a heart attack, he withdrew from the election on August 7, 1968. His withdrawal was seen as setting the race up to be largely a two-way contest between Gribbs and Austin. Before he withdrew from the race, Carey was seen as appealing to conservative voters and was regarded as being better-known than Gribbs. Carey's withdrawal was seen as benefiting Gribbs who was regarded to be more conservative than Austin.

Gribbs campaigned as a moderate, and proposed a nineteen-point plan which placed focus on reviewing both the Detroit Police Department and improving housing conditions in Detroit's inner city. The New York Times wrote that, "although he is a sheriff, he is not a typical law and order candidate, but is generally considered a moderate Democrat." Gribbs avoided the phrase "law and order", declaring in one interview, "I'd rather classify myself as the candidate for order and justice under the law." However, he took a number of positions contrary to those held by most of the Black organizations in the city. This included Gribbs' support for the use of chemical mace by police, opposition to a civilian police review board, and opposition to decentralizing city functions. Gribbs' candidacy was endorsed by the Detroit Police Officers Association.

Austin campaigned as a moderate, but was regarded to be more of a liberal than Gribbs. As an African American, he would have been Detroit's first African American mayor, had he been elected. When he launched his candidacy on June 4, 1969 (prior to Cavanagh's announcement that he would not seek reelection), he became the first-ever major Black candidate for mayor of Detroit. He hoped to be able calm any fears White voters had about a Black man's ability to successfully lead the city. His campaign manager was Robert L. Millender Sr. While avoiding specifics on the issue, Austin gave general support to the idea of implementing civilian control over the Detroit Police Department. In his effort to maintain a moderate appeal, Austin placed most of his campaign's emphasis on aspects such as his performance as auditor in improving the county's financial situation. Austin's candidacy was endorsed by the United Auto Workers.

Among the factors that journalist Carl Rowan identified as having been a challenge to Austin's candidacy were the fact that parts of the city's Black community were not committal towards him (criticizing him as too moderate), the fact that there was a "law and order" desire among much of the city's populace, and the presumption that most Whites would not be willing to vote for a Black man to be mayor. Many Black community leaders found Austin too conservative for their taste, but were unable to agree on an alternate Black candidate and ultimately supported Austin. Time wrote that, before his campaign, Austin was, "little known even among Blacks," and also wrote that he was, "not the first choice of the city's black politicians," who Time reported had wanted to see William Patrick Jr., the president of the New Detroit community organization, run for mayor.

Beck ran a single-issue campaign on the topic of crime control, running on a "law-and-order" platform. She had been a strong critic of outgoing mayor Jerome Cavanagh. She was regarded to appeal to conservative and right-wing voters. Shamie was another candidate that was seen as appealing to conservative and right wing voters.

=== Results ===
The primary was held on September 9, 1969. Austin placed first in the primary. This made him the first Black candidate to advance to a Detroit mayoral general election. By one estimate, White voters had comprised 10% of Austin's vote in the primary. By another estimate, they had comprised 9% of Austin's vote in the primary. Overall, Austin performed poorly in White electoral precincts. Black voters were estimated to have made up about 40% of the voters who participated in the primary election. Gribbs and Austin both performed well in areas of the city that were racially integrated. In the results, some read signs that White voters in certain parts of the city were less willing to vote for Austin for mayor than they were willing to vote for Black contenders for Common Council districts.

Voter turnout was the highest it had been for a Detroit mayoral primary in 32 years. The Associated Press reported on September 10, "Austin benefited in yesterday's municipal election from an unexpectedly heavy turnout of voters, who responded a spirited get-out-the-vote drive in the inner city".

1969 Detroit mayoral primary Nonpartisan election
Candidate	Votes	%
Richard H. Austin	124,941	37.7
Roman Gribbs	105,640	32.9
Mary Beck	71,055	21.5
Others		

== General election ==
Both Austin and Gribbs had avoided the issue of race in the primary. After their first and second-place performances in the primary, they each pledged to avoid making race an issue in the general election, with Austin declaring, "we won't have a racist campaign". Both stayed true, and made efforts to avoid politicizing racial conflict.

While the election was nonpartisan, both Gribbs and Austin were Democrats.

Despite candidates' preferences not to focus on race, the press believed that racial identity was still a major motivating factor for voters. Much of the press doubted Austin's odds in a general election, pointing out the Black voters only comprised 25% of the Detroit's registered electorate as of September (despite comprising 40% of its population). Additionally, it was pointed out that the combined vote of Gribbs and Beck (each White candidates) in the primary was greater than Austin's vote in the primary. However, a September 25, 1969 Jet magazine article denounced what it described as, "an implication that all whites deal in race politics rather than quality candidates," as being "insulting" towards White voters.

Mary Beck ran as a write-in candidate during the general election.

Austin was endorsed by United Steelworkers, Teamsters, and United Auto Workers. Gribb's was endorsed by all three of Detroit's police organizations, as well as the conservative-leaning Real Detroit Committee.

The election was seen to be a closely contested race.

=== Results ===
Voter turnout of over 70% was at record-level for the city's mayoral elections. This came despite rainy and cold weather on election day. Mean turnout in the city's 1,111 precincts was 60.89%, with a standard deviation of 7.21 percentage points. Mean turnout in the 221 precincts that were 90% or more Black was 70.59%, with a standard deviation of 6.64 percentage points. Mean turnout in the 461 precincts that were 90% or more White was 68.79%, with a standard deviation of 6.89%.

Gribb's won a roughly 7,000 vote majority, winning an estimated 82% of the White vote and an estimated 6% of the Black vote. Gribbs swept predominantly White precincts, which saw some record turnouts (some approaching 80%). Austin solidly won Black parts of the city. He lost, in part, due to many inner-city districts having low voter turnout (some as low as 40% in some).

Mary Beck won only around 2,000 votes as a write-in candidate.

1969 Detroit mayoral general election Nonpartisan election
Candidate	Votes	%
Roman Gribbs	257,714	50.60
Richard H. Austin	250,751	49.40
Mary Beck (write-in)	~2,000	

== Aftermath ==
Detroit would go on to elect a Black mayor in its next election in 1973, when Coleman Young was elected. Young had been a supporter of Austin's 1969 candidacy.

Immediately after Austin's strong general election performance, top Democratic Party officials, such as Michigan Democratic Party chairman James McNeely, openly considered running Austin for statewide office in 1970, such as for lieutenant governor. He ultimately ran for Michigan secretary of state in 1970 and was elected, becoming the first African American to hold statewide elected office in Michigan and the first African American to serve as any U.S. state's secretary of state.
