= Richard H. Austin =

American politician

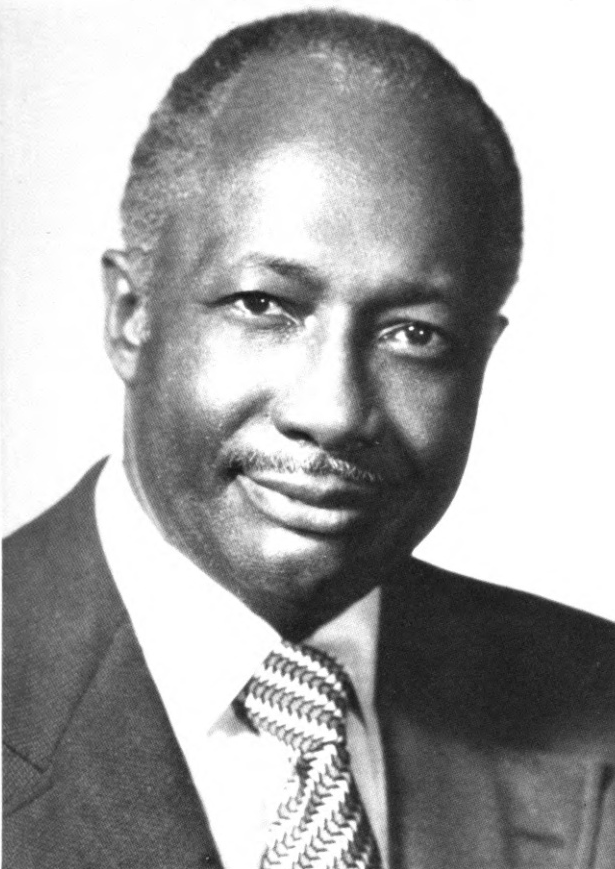
- Richard H. Austin, 1975

39th Secretary of State of Michigan
- In office January 1, 1971 – January 1, 1995
- Governor: William Milliken; James Blanchard; John Engler
- Preceded by: James M. Hare
- Succeeded by: Candice Miller

Wayne County Auditor
- In office 1967–1971

Personal details
- Born: Richard Henry Austin; May 6, 1913 Stouts Mountain, Alabama, U.S.
- Died: April 20, 2001 (aged 87) Detroit, Michigan, U.S.
- Party: Democratic
- Spouse: Ida Austin
- Children: 1

Richard Henry Austin (May 6, 1913 – April 20, 2001) was an American politician. A Democrat, he served as the Michigan secretary of state from 1971 to 1995, the longest-serving secretary of state in the state, the first African American elected to the position, the first Black person to win election to any statewide office in Michigan except the Supreme Court. Also the first Black certified public accountant in Michigan, he previously served from 1967 to 1971 as the first Black Wayne County auditor, and ran unsuccessfully for mayor of Detroit in 1969.

== Early life and education ==
Austin was born in Stouts Mountain, Cullman County, Alabama. His father, a coal miner, died when Austin was 11, after which his mother moved with her three sons to Detroit; as a child he worked as a bootblack.

After graduating first in his class from Cass Technical High School, he was awarded an athletics scholarship to Wayne University, but had to leave for financial reasons; working in a shoe store and taking night classes, he earned a Bachelor of Arts degree in business administration from the Detroit Institute of Technology in 1937, and in 1941 became the first Black certified public accountant in Michigan.

== Professional career ==
In 1941, Austin founded the accounting firm of Richard H Austin & Co, which later became Austin, Washington & Davenport. After becoming Secretary of State in 1970, he sold the firm, which in 1971 became George Johnson & Company and now operates as GJC CPAs & Advisors.

== Early political career ==
Austin served as an elected delegate for the Wayne County 6th District to the constitutional convention that produced the 1962 Michigan Constitution. In 1962 he also served on the Michigan State Board of Equalization and was elected to the Wayne County Board of Supervisors. He was co-chairman of the Michigan Commission on Legislative Apportionment from 1963 to 1965.

In 1964, he ran for Congress in Michigan's 1st congressional district, but lost to John Conyers in the Democratic Party primary election by 38 votes.

He was elected the first Black Wayne County auditor in 1966.

In 1969 he ran for mayor of Detroit, leading in the nonpartisan primary but lost to fellow Democrat Roman Gribbs, 49% to 51%.

== Michigan Secretary of State ==
In 1970, Austin was elected as the Michigan Secretary of State, making him the first Black person to hold that position in any U.S. state and also the first elected to any statewide office in Michigan except for the Supreme Court. He became the longest-serving secretary of state in Michigan history, serving until January 1, 1995, after he lost a re-election campaign bid in 1994 to Republican Candice Miller.

During his tenure, Austin emphasized road safety, supporting the enactment of laws mandating use of seat belts and child safety seats and retention of the law requiring motorcycle helmets, and also achieving improvements to driver education and traffic safety. He also introduced mail-in vehicle registration renewals, license-plate tabs, and in 1975 the first "Motor Voter" law, a model for the National Voter Registration Act of 1993.

In 1976 Austin unsuccessfully sought the Democratic nomination for the U.S. Senate seat being vacated by retiring Philip Hart, losing to Don Riegle.

== Personal life and death ==
In 1939 Austin married Ida Dawson; they had a daughter. He died in Detroit on April 20, 2001, at the age of 87, from a heart attack and Alzheimer's disease. His papers are held at Wayne State University.

== Legacy ==
In recognition of his service to traffic safety, Austin was placed on the Michigan Transportation Hall of Honor in 1996, and the annual award of the Michigan Governor's Traffic Safety Advisory Commission was renamed for him. The Treasury Building in Lansing was renamed to the Richard H. Austin building by an act of the state legislature in 2005.

Party political offices
Preceded by James M. Hare	Democratic nominee for Michigan Secretary of State; 1970, 1974, 1978, 1982, 1986, 1990, 1994	Succeeded by Mary Lou Parks
Political offices
Preceded by James M. Hare	Secretary of State of Michigan; 1971–1994	Succeeded by Candice Miller
