= James M. Hare =

American politician (1910–1980)

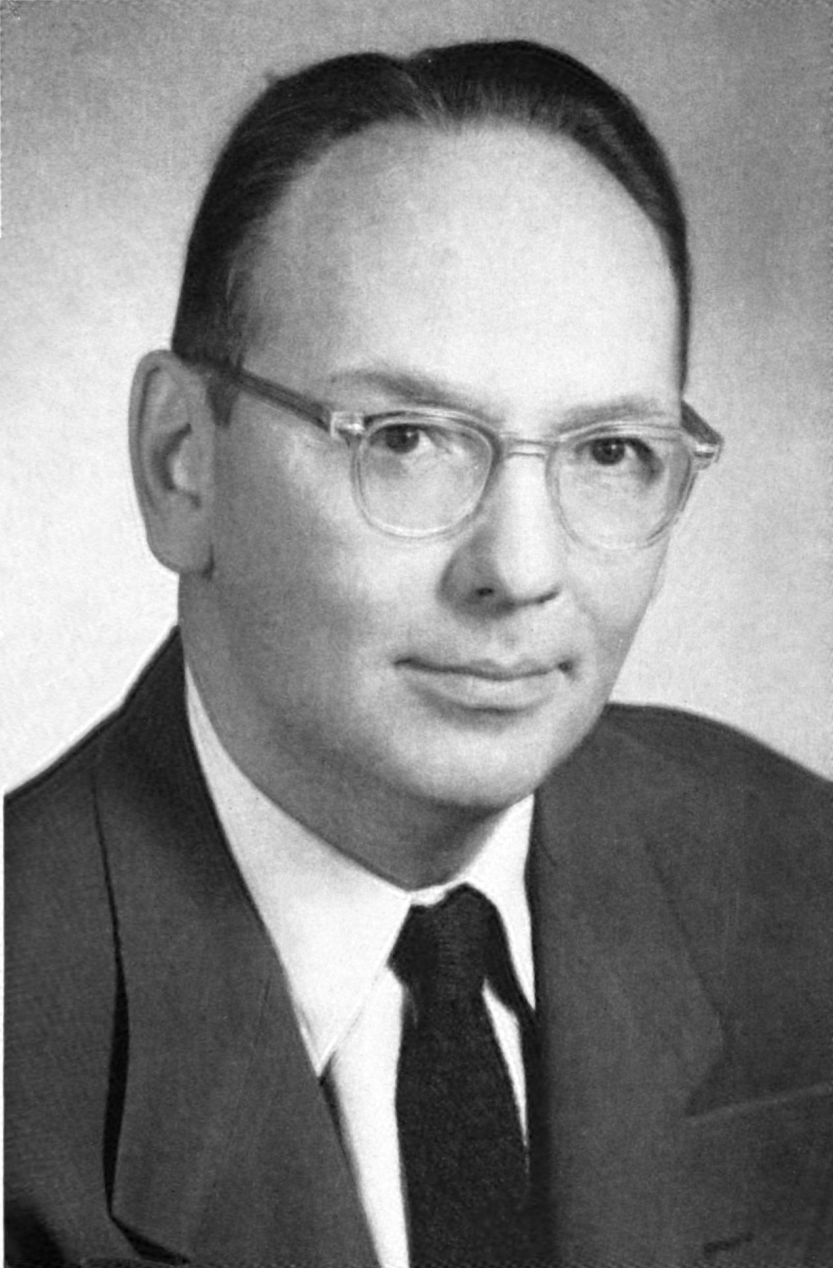

38th Secretary of State of Michigan
- In office January 1, 1955 – December 31, 1970
- Governor: G. Mennen Williams; John Swainson; George W. Romney; William G. Milliken
- Preceded by: Owen Cleary
- Succeeded by: Richard H. Austin

Personal details
- Born: James McNeil Hare; July 31, 1910 Racine, Wisconsin
- Died: March 11, 1980 (aged 69) Venice, Florida
- Party: Democratic

James M. Hare (July 31, 1910 – March 10, 1980) was an American politician who served as the 38th Michigan Secretary of State.

== Biography ==
Hare was born James McNeil Hare in Racine, Wisconsin. He died in 1980. Hare was a Unitarian.

== Career ==
Hare was Secretary of State from 1955 to 1970. In 1960, he was a candidate in the Democratic primary for Governor of Michigan, losing to John Swainson. As Secretary of State, Hare called the Michigan Constitutional Convention of 1961 to order.

Party political offices
| Preceded by Robert S. McAllister | Democratic nominee for Michigan Secretary of State; 1954, 1956, 1958, 1960, 1962, 1964, 1966 | Succeeded by Richard H. Austin |
Political offices
| Preceded by Owen J. Cleary | Secretary of State of Michigan; 1955–1970 | Succeeded by Richard H. Austin |
