= 2014 Wayne County Executive election =

- November 4, 2014
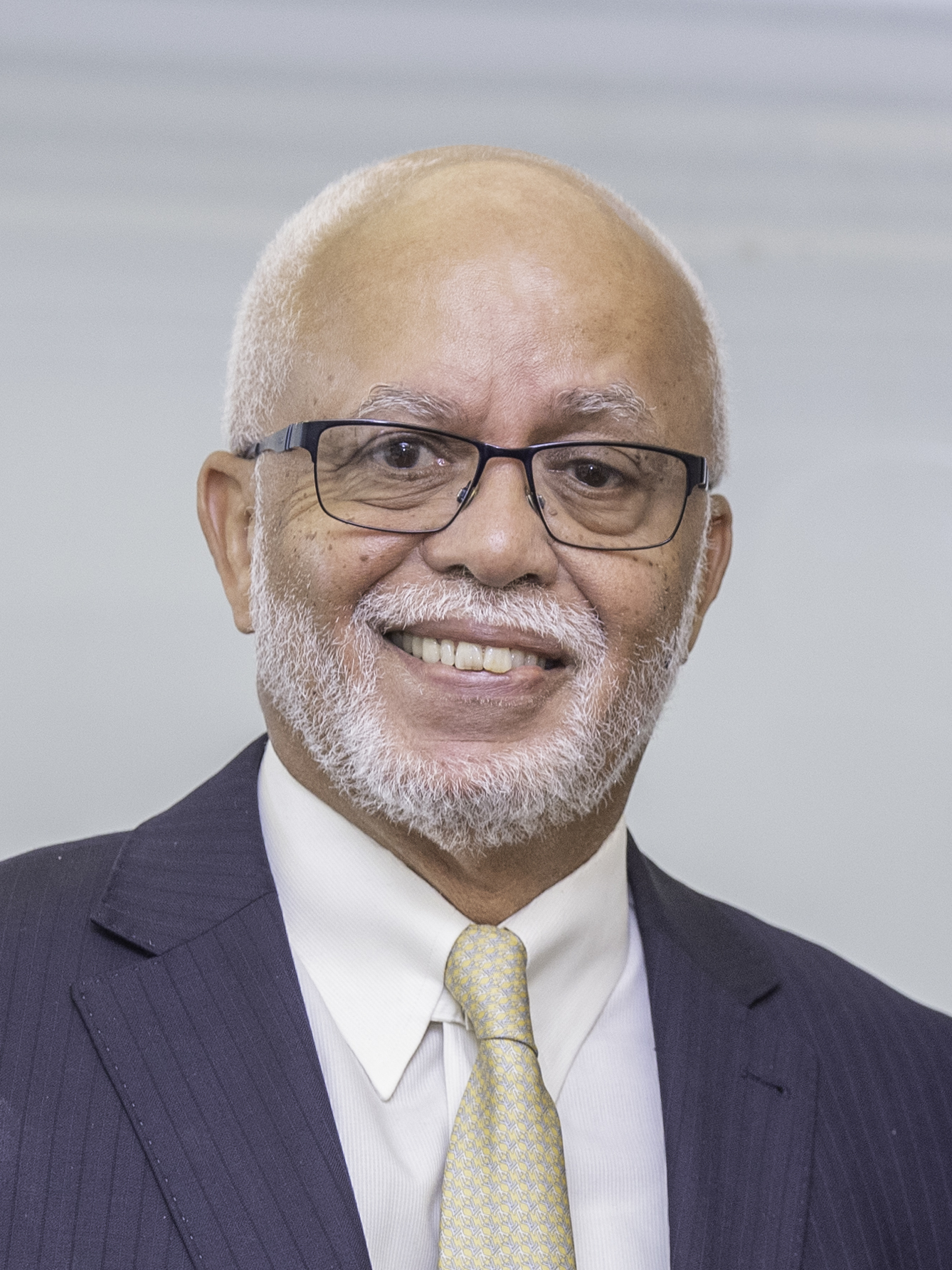

Nominee	Warren Evans	John Dalton
Party	Democratic	Republican
Popular vote	341,281	133,098
Percentage	69.70%	27.18%
Wayne County Executive before election
Robert A. Ficano
Democratic
Elected Wayne County Executive
Warren Evans
Democratic

The 2014 Wayne County Executive election was held on November 4, 2014. Incumbent County Executive Robert A. Ficano ran for re-election to his fourth term. However, Ficano's administration faced a federal investigation into alleged corruption, which resulted in several of Ficano's aides pleading guilty to criminal charges. Ficano faced many challengers in the Democratic primary, and was ultimately defeated in a landslide, winning just 6 percent of the vote while former County Sheriff Warren Evans won the nomination with 44 percent of the vote. In the general election, Evans faced John Dalton, the Republican nominee and a member of the Livonia Human Relations Commission. Evans defeated Dalton in a landslide, receiving 70 percent of the vote.

== Democratic primary ==
=== Candidates ===
- Warren Evans, former Chief of the Detroit Police Department, former Wayne County Sheriff, 2009 candidate for Mayor of Detroit
- William R. Wild, Mayor of Westland
- Phil Cavanagh, State Representative
- Kevin M. McNamara, Wayne County Commissioner
- Robert Ficano, incumbent County Executive
- Bettie Cook Scott, former State Representative
- Christopher Wojtowicz, county claims investigator
- Cindy Darrah, 2013 candidate for Detroit City Clerk
- Sigmunt John Szczepkowski, Jr., perennial candidate
- Adam Salam Adamski (formerly Mario Nesr Fundarski), 2010 Republican nominee for Wayne County Executive, businessman, anti-Israel activist
- Russell George Leviska, former county employee

=== Results ===
Democratic primary results
Party	Candidate	Votes	%
Democratic	Warren Evans	68,795	43.86%
Democratic	William R. Wild	40,928	26.09%
Democratic	Phil Cavanagh	15,332	9.77%
Democratic	Kevin M. McNamara	10,625	6.77%
Democratic	Robert A. Ficano (inc.)	9,370	5.97%
Democratic	Bettie Cook Scott	4,722	3.01%
Democratic	Christopher Wojtowicz	2,643	1.69%
Democratic	Cindy Darrah	2,387	1.52%
Democratic	Sigmunt John Szczepkowski, Jr.	840	0.54%
Democratic	Adam Salam Adamski	670	0.43%
Democratic	Russell George Leviska	303	0.19%
Democratic	Write-ins	238	0.15%
Total votes		156,853	100.00%

== Republican primary ==
=== Candidates ===
- John Dalton, Schoolcraft College student, member of the Livonia Human Relations Commission
- Fred A. Bolden, computer consultant
- Daniel K. Wenderlich, Livonia resident

=== Results ===
Republican primary results
Party	Candidate	Votes	%
Republican	John Dalton	15,761	43.86%
Republican	Fred A. Bolden	10,393	28.92%
Republican	Daniel K. Wenderlich	9,510	26.46%
Republican	Write-ins	271	0.75%
Total votes		35,935	100.00%

== General election ==
=== Results ===
2014 Wayne County Executive election
Party	Candidate	Votes	%
Democratic	Warren Evans	341,281	69.70%
Republican	John Dalton	133,098	27.18%
Libertarian	Keith Butkovich	14,482	2.96%
Write-in		748	0.15%
Total votes		489,609	100.00%
Democratic hold			
