= Mike Duggan =

American politician (born 1958)

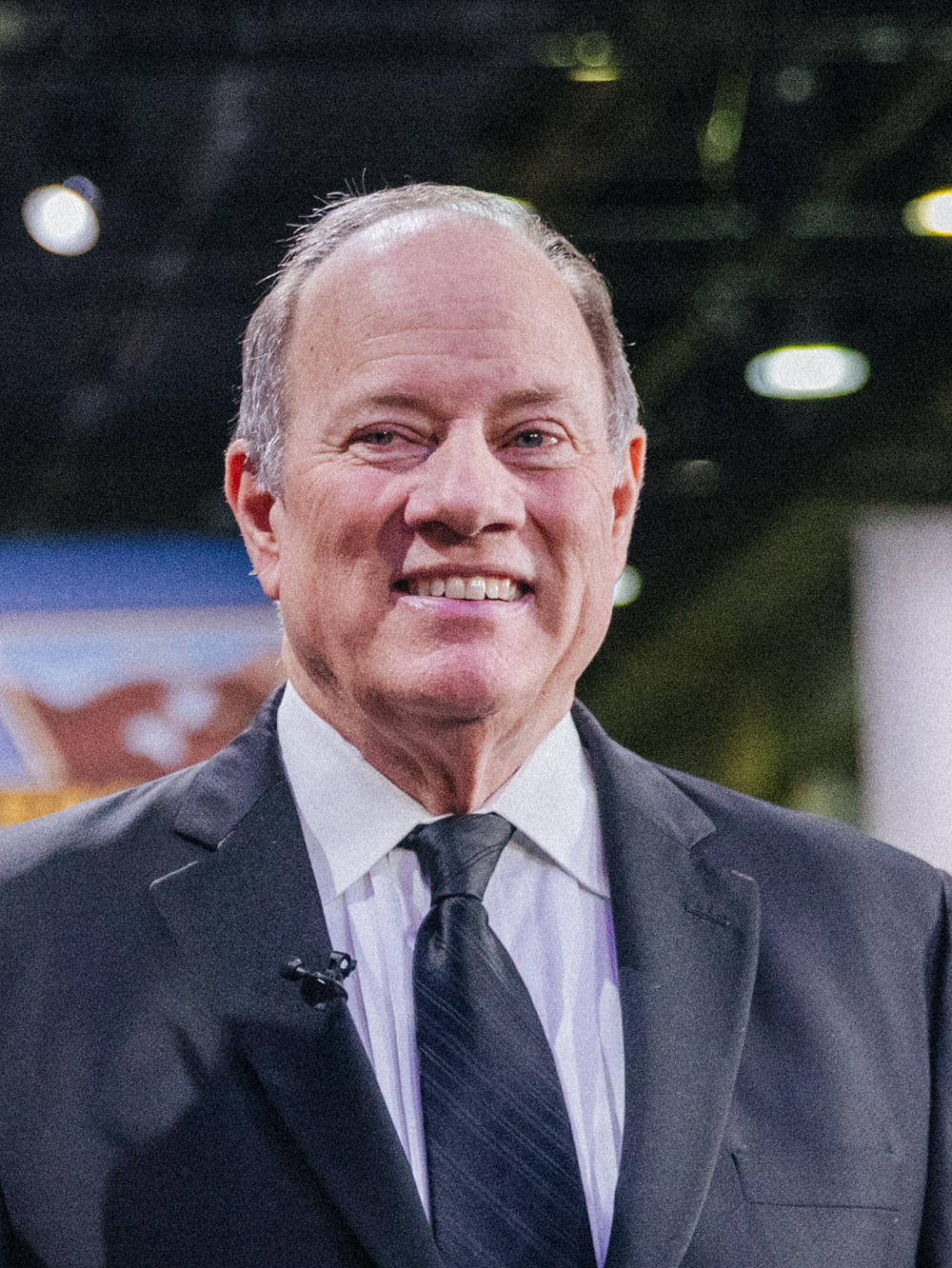
- Duggan in 2025

75th Mayor of Detroit
- In office January 1, 2014 – January 1, 2026
- Preceded by: Dave Bing
- Succeeded by: Mary Sheffield

Prosecutor of Wayne County
- In office July 11, 2001 – July 16, 2004
- Preceded by: John O'Hair
- Succeeded by: Kym Worthy

Personal details
- Born: Michael Edward Duggan; July 15, 1958 (age 68) Detroit, Michigan, U.S.
- Party: Democratic (before 2024); Independent (2024–present)
- Spouse: Lori Maher (div. 2019) Sonia Hassan (m. 2021)
- Children: 4
- Parent: Patrick J. Duggan (father)
- Education: University of Michigan (BA, JD)

Michael Edward Duggan (born July 15, 1958) is an American lawyer and politician who served as the 75th mayor of Detroit from 2014 to 2026. Duggan previously served as the Wayne County Prosecutor from 2001 to 2004, and as the deputy county executive of Wayne County from 1987 until 2001. Duggan was a member of the Democratic Party until 2024, when he became an independent. He ran for governor of Michigan in the 2026 election, but withdrew from the race in May 2026. He is the second longest serving mayor of Detroit. Throughout his tenure as mayor, Duggan was known for his efforts revitalizing Detroit after its decline. In 2025, Duggan was named “America’s Most Effective Mayor” by Governing magazine.

== Early life and education ==
Duggan was born in Detroit on July 15, 1958, to Patrick J. Duggan and Joan Colosimo. His paternal grandfather was from County Kilkenny, Ireland moving to Detroit at the age of 18, and his paternal grandmother was the child of Irish and German immigrants. Duggan spent his first six years at a home on Stansbury Street on the city's west side before moving to nearby Livonia in 1963. He graduated from Detroit Catholic Central High School. Duggan received a Bachelor of Arts from the University of Michigan in 1980 and a Juris Doctor in 1983.

== Early career ==
As a Democrat, Duggan has served as an appointed and an elected official in Wayne County, Michigan, beginning in 1986 as Wayne County's assistant corporation counsel. He was deputy County Executive from 1987 to 2001 under Edward H. McNamara, and was elected prosecutor in 2000. He also served as the interim general manager of SMART, the region's public transit authority, from 1992 to 1996.

Beginning in 2004, Duggan was president and CEO of the Detroit Medical Center. He was in this position when the formerly nonprofit DMC was sold to publicly traded Vanguard Health Systems in 2010.

== Mayoralty ==
=== 2013 election campaign ===
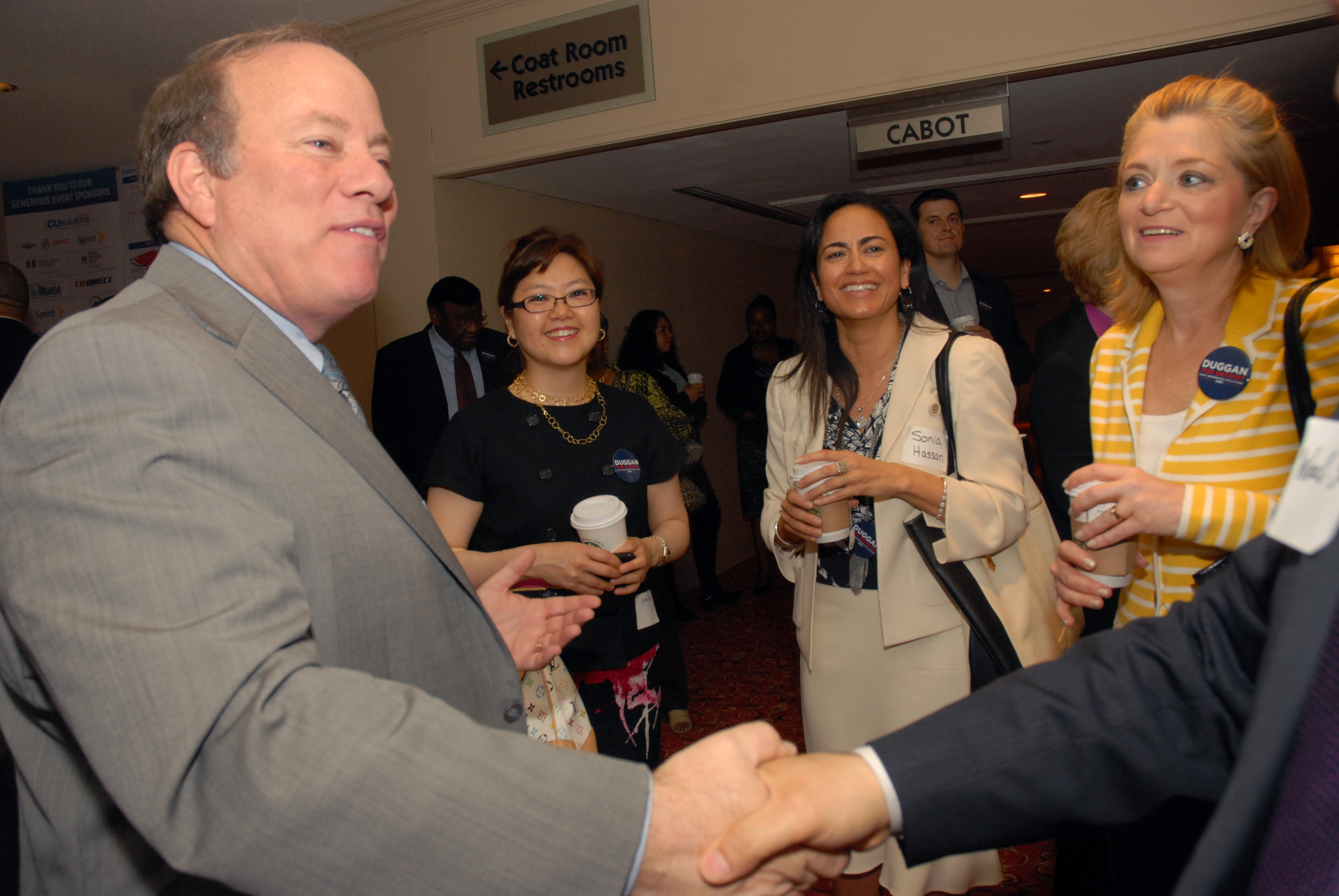
Duggan campaigning in May 2013

In 2012, Duggan resigned his position at the DMC and moved from the suburb of Livonia to the city of Detroit, intending to run for the office of mayor the following year. However, he failed to qualify for the ballot because he filed less than a year after establishing residency in the city; if he had waited two more weeks to file—which still would have met the filing deadline—he would have qualified.

Instead, he mounted a write-in campaign, and received 52 percent of the vote in the August primary election. Under Detroit's two-round system, the two highest vote-getters run against one another in the general election, which meant that Duggan ran against second-place finisher Benny Napoleon, who had won 29 percent of the vote. Duggan ran with the campaign slogan, "Every neighborhood has a future", on a platform of financial turnaround, crime reduction, and economic development. He received 55 percent of the vote in the general election in November, becoming the first white mayor of the now-majority-black city since Roman Gribbs, who served when the city was still predominantly white, from 1970 to 1974.

=== First term ===
Duggan focused, during his first term, on improvements to emergency services response times and bus services. He also saw a demolition program that was ambitious, but controversial.

Duggan had pledged to create a municipally owned insurance company, dubbed "D Insurance". However, the bill failed to pass in the Michigan Legislature.

Detroit's unemployment rate declined during Duggan's first term, reaching 7.5 percent by 2017; though the city's population had also declined. Duggan also created the "Grow Detroit’s Young Talent" program, a youth summer employment program that employed thousands of youth.

In 2017, the city began issuing Detroit ID, a municipal identification card, which helps enable residents without a social security number to access city services and some banks.

Toward the end of his first term, Duggan established a city office focused on sustainability and environmental planning, which later produced a citywide sustainability action plan. Duggan's hardline stance on graffiti drew praise for his cleanup efforts and criticism over fines imposed on property owners for graffiti not removed within seven days. He also required murals to be registered with the city.

=== Second term ===
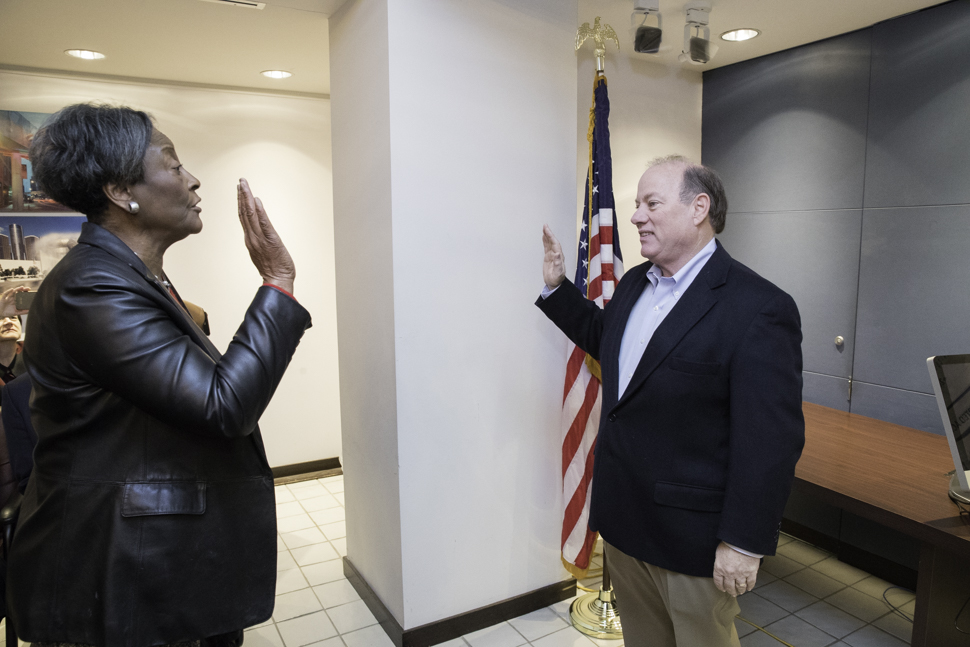
Duggan taking his oath of office for his second term

In the 2017 Detroit mayoral election, Duggan was re-elected in a landslide, taking 72 percent of the vote to challenger Coleman Young II's 27 percent.

In 2018, the city of Detroit was released from state oversight, giving its municipal government full control over its operations for the first time in four decades.

In 2019, Detroit's Office of Inspector General released a report concluding that Duggan had provided preferential treatment to the nonprofit Make Your Date by "unilaterally" directing city resources. The report also found that his chief of staff Alexis Wiley and two other top aides, had ordered public employees to erase emails having to do with to the nonprofit Make Your Date. Michigan Attorney General Dana Nessel launched an investigation into this. In September 2020, Investigative Reporters and Editors awarded Duggan and the city the dubious honor of the "Golden Padlock Award", recognizing them as the most secretive United States agency or individual.

During the COVID-19 pandemic, Duggan was credited with having implemented efforts such as mass testing. In March 2021, Duggan initially declined to order 6,000 doses of the Johnson & Johnson COVID-19 vaccine, saying that he believed the Pfizer and Moderna vaccines were better options. After backlash, Duggan declared he would no longer decline the vaccine.

Duggan spent much of the last days of his second term managing the city's rollout of the COVID-19 vaccine. In February 2021, Duggan went to Washington D.C. to meet with other state and local leaders and President Joe Biden to discuss the responses to the pandemic.

In December 2021, Duggan announced plans to demolish the abandoned former American Motors Headquarters building.

=== Third term ===
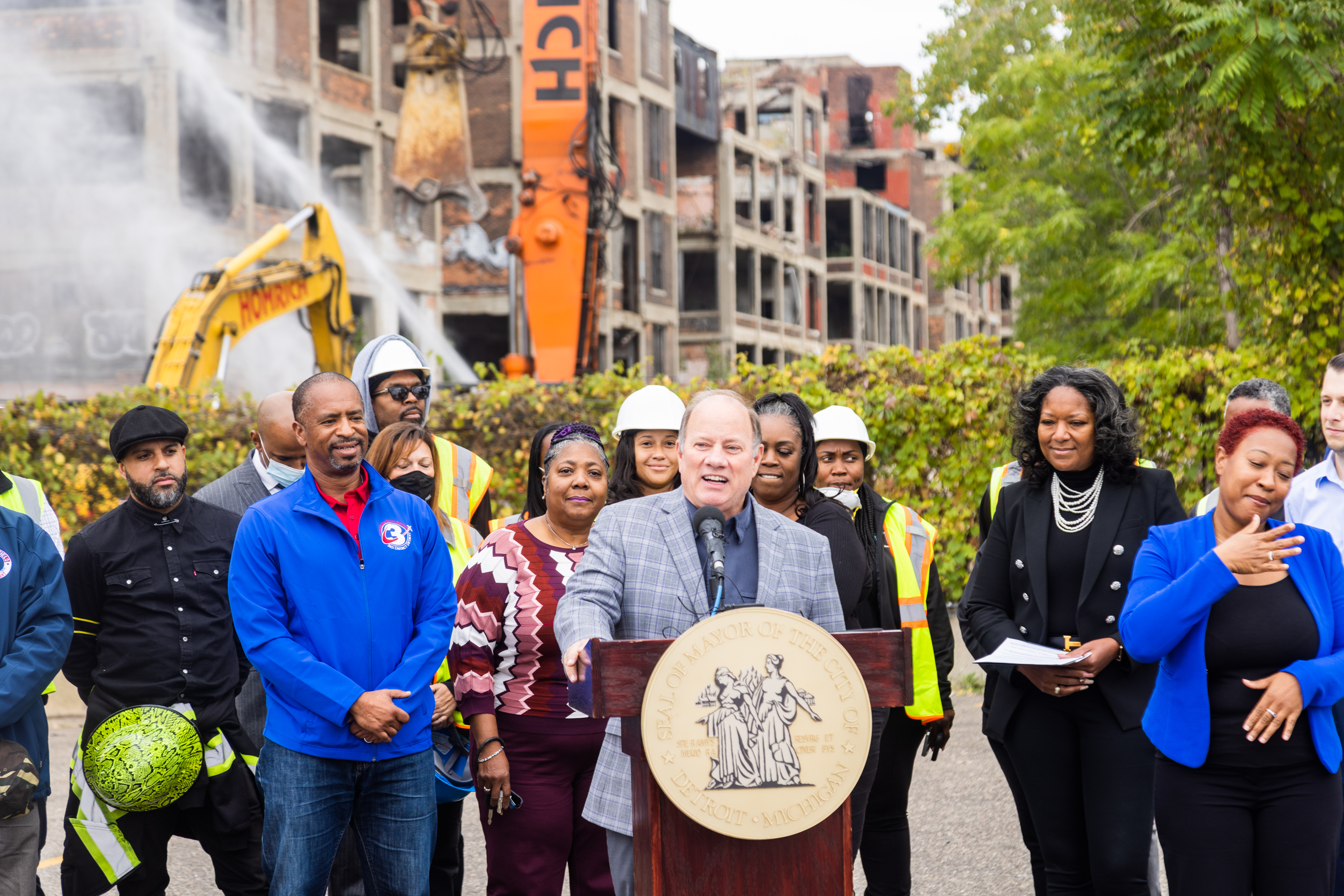
Duggan at the partial demolition of the Packard Automotive Plant in 2022

Duggan was re-elected for a third term in the 2021 Detroit mayoral election.

Duggan and other city Council Members developed a $203 million plan to provide affordable housing for Detroit residents.

In 2023, Duggan proposed a land value tax, which would double the tax rate paid on bare land while reducing taxes on homes, businesses, and other property investments. State Representative Stephanie Young introduced legislation to create a land value tax. In October, the land value tax failed to pass in the Michigan House of Representatives.

In 2023, Detroit recorded its first year of net population growth since 1957 according to estimates by the United States Census Bureau. Prior to this release, Duggan had filed lawsuits alleging that the bureau had undercounted the city's population.

In November 2024, Duggan announced that he would not seek a fourth term as mayor. Succeeded by Mary Sheffield, Duggan left office on January 1, 2026.

== 2026 gubernatorial campaign ==
In December 2024, Duggan announced he would leave the Democratic Party, and run an independent candidacy for governor in 2026. He withdrew from the race in May 2026, citing declining polling and fundraising, and a national political environment favorable to Democratic candidates.

== Personal life ==
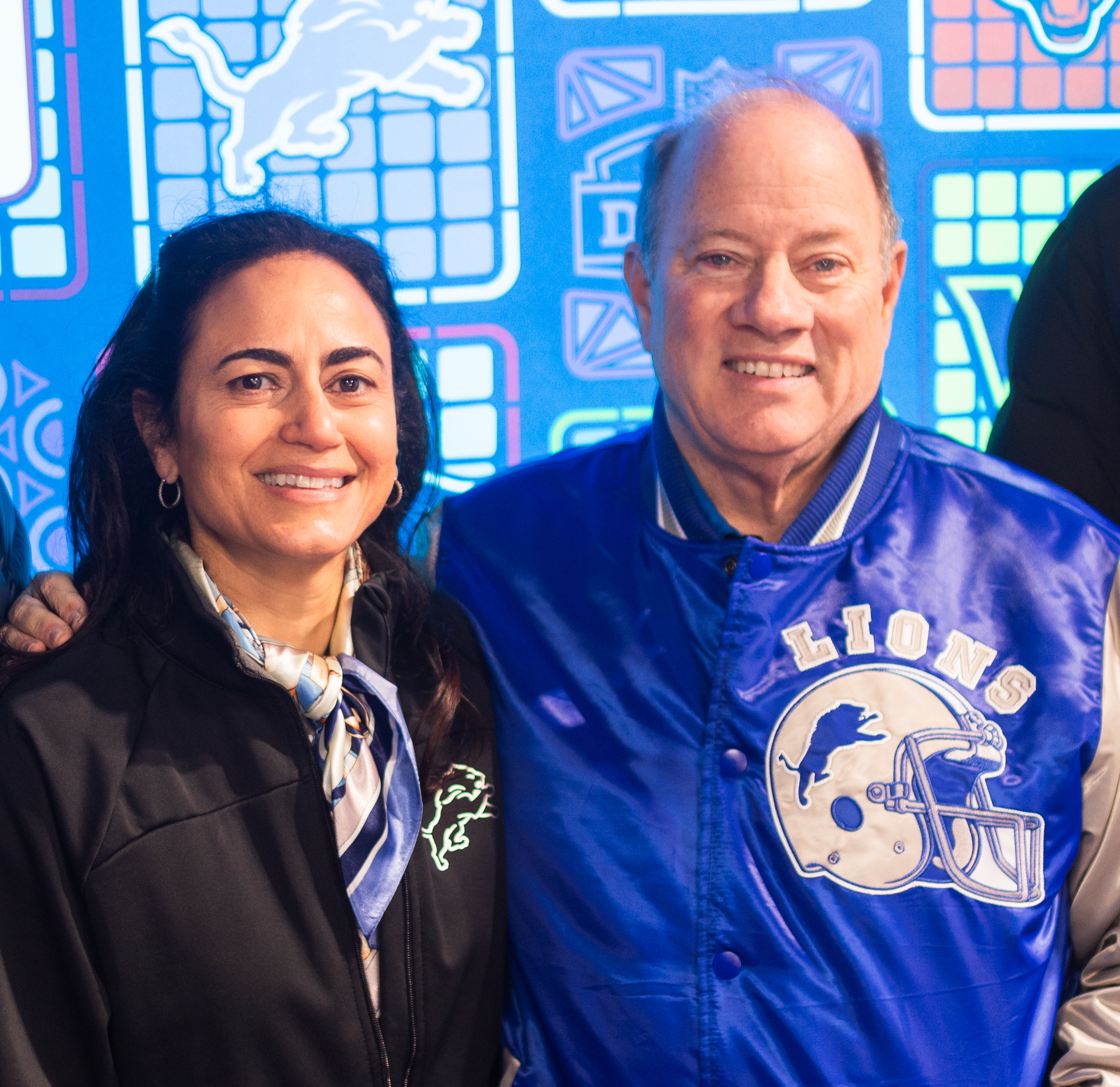
Duggan and Dr. Sonia Hassan, his wife since 2021

Duggan was married to Mary Loretto Maher for over 30 years, and they had four children. In May 2019, Maher filed for divorce. The divorce was finalized on September 17, 2019.

On June 29, 2021, Duggan announced his engagement to Dr. Sonia Hassan, a professor of obstetrics and gynecology at Wayne State University School of Medicine. Duggan and Hassan had been publicly linked prior to his divorce from Maher, and their relationship was the subject of public scrutiny and whether Duggan and the city gave preferential treatment to a program that Hassan led at Wayne State University. He married Hassan in 2021.

Political offices
| Preceded by Dave Bing | Mayor of Detroit; 2014–2026 | Succeeded by Mary Sheffield |
