= Roman Gribbs =

American politician

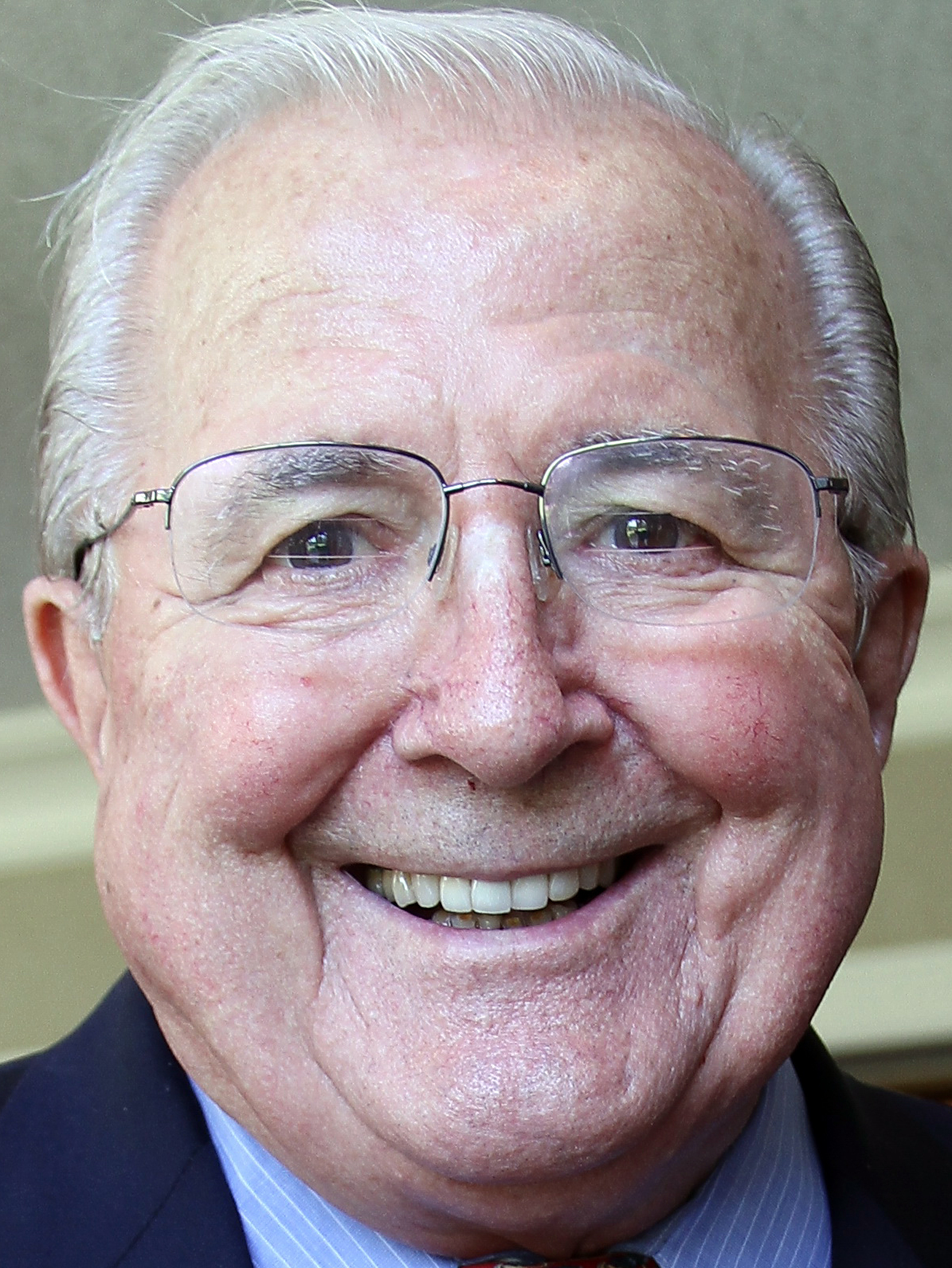
- Gribbs in 2010

Judge of the Michigan Court of Appeals
- In office January 1, 1983 – January 1, 2001

65th Mayor of Detroit
- In office January 6, 1970 – January 1, 1974
- Preceded by: Jerome Cavanagh
- Succeeded by: Coleman Young

46th President of the National League of Cities
- In office 1973
- Preceded by: Sam Massell
- Succeeded by: Tom Bradley

Wayne County Sheriff
- In office 1968–1969
- Preceded by: Peter L. Buback
- Succeeded by: William Lucas

Personal details
- Born: Roman Stanley Gribbs; December 29, 1925 Detroit, Michigan, U.S.
- Died: April 5, 2016 (aged 90) Northville, Michigan, U.S.
- Party: Democratic
- Spouses: Katherine Stratis (m. 1954–1982) Leola Young Barr (m. 1990–2016)
- Children: 5
- Education: University of Detroit

Military service
- Allegiance: United States
- Branch/service: United States Army
- Years of service: 1944–1948
- Battles/wars: World War II

Roman Stanley Gribbs (December 29, 1925 – April 5, 2016) was an American attorney and politician who served as the mayor of Detroit from 1970 to 1974. Later, Gribbs served as a judge on the Michigan Court of Appeals. Gribbs was the last white mayor of the city, which was in the midst of becoming a majority-black city, until the election of Mike Duggan in 2013.

== Life and career ==
Gribbs was born in Detroit on December 29, 1925. He was raised on a farm near Capac, Michigan. His parents were Polish immigrants who were basically farmers, though his father also worked on the Ford assembly line. After graduating from high school in 1944, Gribbs served in the Army until 1948. He graduated from the University of Detroit in 1952 with a degree in economics and accounting, and received a law degree from the same institution in 1954. He was an instructor at the university from 1955 through 1957, and became an assistant prosecutor in 1957, a position he held until 1964. He entered private practice in 1964, in the Detroit law firm of Shaheen, Gribbs, and Brickley, where he was partner with Joseph Shaheen of Grosse Pointe Park. Gribbs ran for a seat as a Recorder's Court judge in 1966, but lost.

In 1968, Gribbs was appointed sheriff of Wayne County, later winning a full four-year term.

=== Mayoralty ===
In 1969, Gribbs was elected mayor of Detroit, defeating opponent Richard H. Austin who later became Michigan Secretary of State. Rather than residing in the Manoogian Mansion, the official residence of the mayor of Detroit, Gribbs maintained residence in Rosedale Park, a neighborhood in northwest Detroit.

In 1969, Gribbs created the Stop the Robberies, Enjoy Safe Streets (STRESS), a secret and elite police unit. STRESS used a tactic called "decoy operation," where a police officer tried to entrap potential criminals in an undercover sting. From its inception, STRESS all but ignored white criminals, instead focusing their operations on black communities. STRESS increased confrontations between the black community and police. For example, during its first year of operation the Detroit Police Department had the "highest number of civilian killings per capita of any American police department." The unit was accused of conducting 500 raids without the use of search warrants and killing 20 people within 30 months.

In 1973, Gribbs served as president of the National League of Cities.

Gribbs declined to seek re-election in 1973 and was succeeded by Coleman Young who was elected Detroit's first African-American mayor in November of that year.

On July 21, 1973, Mayor Gribbs proclaimed “Mary Wilson (of The Supremes) Day” in Detroit, and presented Wilson with a plaque to commemorate the event.

=== Subsequent career ===
After leaving the mayor's office, Gribbs returned to private practice. Gribbs became a circuit court judge in 1975. He was elected to the Michigan Court of Appeals in 1982, upon which he served until his retirement in 2001. Gribbs retired to Northville in suburban Detroit, and conducted private practice in mediation and arbitration. He was the chairman of the board of directors of the Piast Institute, a research center devoted to Polish and Polish American affairs.

== Personal life ==
Gribbs was married to Katherine Stratis (1932–2011) from 1954 to 1982, and together they had four daughters (Paula, Carla, Rebecca, Elizabeth) and one son (Christopher). In 1990, he married Leola Young Barr. Gribbs died on April 5, 2016, at his home in Northville, Michigan from cancer, aged 90.

Political offices
Preceded by Jerome Cavanagh	Mayor of Detroit; January 6, 1970 – January 1, 1974	Succeeded by Coleman Young
