= Stop the Robberies, Enjoy Safe Streets =

Detroit Police Department unit

Stop The Robberies, Enjoy Safe Streets (STRESS) was a Detroit Police Department unit that operated from 1971 until 1974.

STRESS was created to reduce crime in Detroit by surveilling and catching criminals in the act. It used decoy units, targeting African-American men. It led to the deaths of twenty-four men, twenty-two of them African-American, over the course of three and a half years.

A 1973 poll found that 65 percent of black Detroiters disapproved and 78 percent of white Detroiters approved of STRESS.
