= 2009 Detroit mayoral special election =

- May 5, 2009
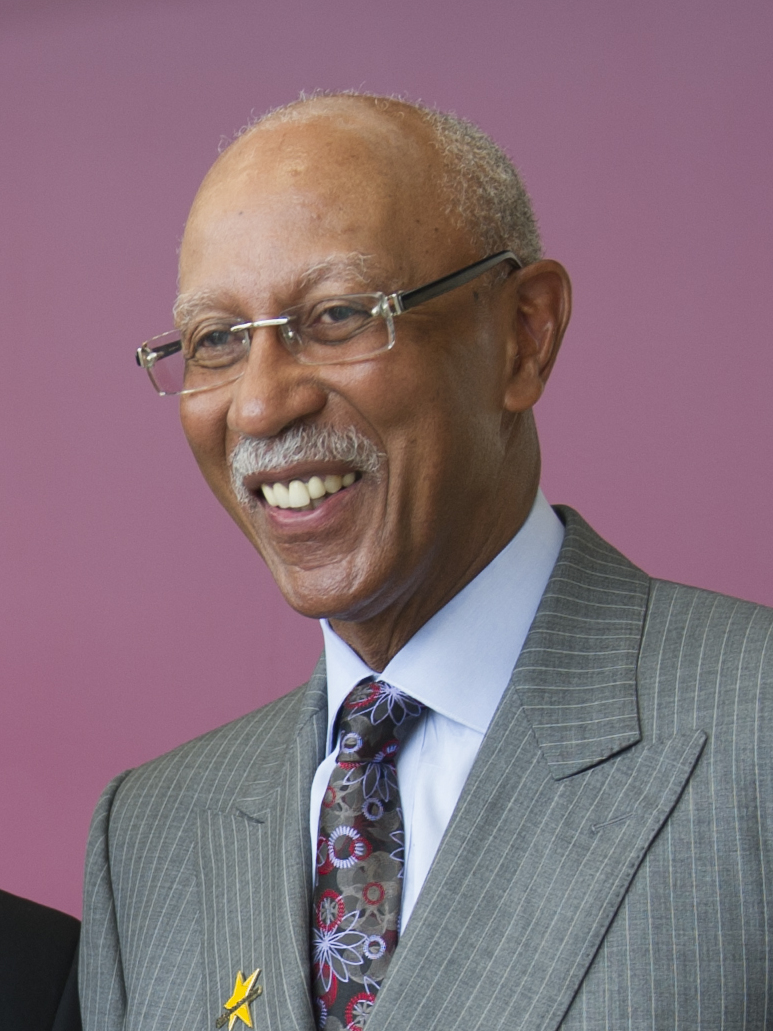

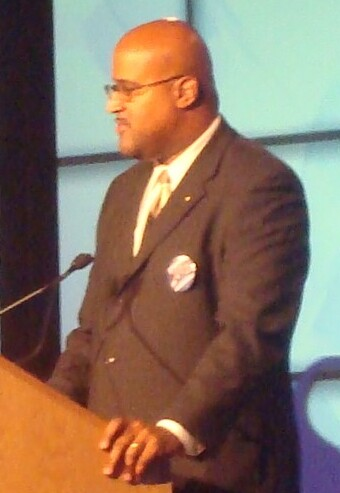
Candidate	Dave Bing	Ken Cockrel Jr.
Popular vote	49,054	44,772
Percentage	51.74%	47.22%
Mayor before election
Ken Cockrel Jr. (acting)
Nonpartisan
Elected mayor
Dave Bing
Nonpartisan

The 2009 Detroit mayoral special election took place on May 5, 2009, following a primary on February 24, 2009. Mayor Kwame Kilpatrick, who was elected in 2005, resigned after being indicted for obstruction of justice in 2008, elevating City Council President Kenneth Cockrel Jr. as acting Mayor. Cockrel ran in the special election, and faced a crowded field of competitors, including businessman and former professional basketball player Dave Bing, former Deputy Mayor and 2005 mayoral candidate Freman Hendrix, Wayne County Sheriff Warren Evans, State Representative Coleman Young II, and former City Councilwoman Sharon McPhail.

Cockrel placed second in the primary, winning 27 percent of the vote to Bing's 29 percent, and both advanced to the general election. Bing narrowly defeated Cockrel, 52–47 percent. He was elected to a full term in the regular election later that year.

== Primary election ==
=== Candidates ===
- Dave Bing, businessman, former professional basketball player
- Ken Cockrel Jr., incumbent Mayor
- Freman Hendrix, former Deputy Mayor, 2005 candidate for Mayor
- Warren Evans, Wayne County Sheriff
- Coleman Young II, State Representative, son of former Mayor Coleman Young
- Sharon McPhail, former general counsel to Mayor Kipatrick, former City Councilwoman, 1993 and 2005 candidate for Mayor
- Nicholas Hood III, former City Councilman
- Jerroll Sanders, business consultant
- D. Etta Wilcoxon, publisher
- Brenda K. Sanders, district court judge
- Donald R. Bradley, obstetrician and gynecologist
- Dianne Montgomery, engineer
- Stanley Michael Christmas, community activist
- Joseph W. Holt, former high school teacher
- Frances D. Culver, city schools employee

=== Results ===
2009 Detroit mayoral special primary election
Party	Candidate	Votes	%
Nonpartisan	Dave Bing	26,337	28.82%
Nonpartisan	Ken Cockrel Jr. (inc.)	24,677	27.00%
Nonpartisan	Freman Hendrix	21,208	23.21%
Nonpartisan	Warren Evans	9,193	10.06%
Nonpartisan	Coleman Young II	3,744	4.10%
Nonpartisan	Sharon McPhail	2,565	2.81%
Nonpartisan	Nicholas Hood III	2,077	2.27%
Nonpartisan	Jerroll Sanders	336	0.37%
Nonpartisan	D. Etta Wilcoxon	309	0.34%
Nonpartisan	Brenda K. Sanders	199	0.22%
Nonpartisan	Donald R. Bradley	157	0.17%
Nonpartisan	Duanne Montgomery	152	0.17%
Nonpartisan	Stanley Michael Christmas	103	0.11%
Nonpartisan	Joseph W. Holt	101	0.11%
Nonpartisan	Frances D. Culver	87	0.10%
Write-in		136	0.15%
Total votes		91,381	100.00%

== General election ==
=== Results ===
2009 Detroit mayoral special general election results
Party	Candidate	Votes	%
Nonpartisan	Dave Bing	49,054	51.74%
Nonpartisan	Ken Cockrel Jr. (inc.)	44,772	47.22%
Write-in		987	1.04%
Total votes		94,813	100.00%
