= Coleman Young II =

American politician (born 1982)

Coleman Young
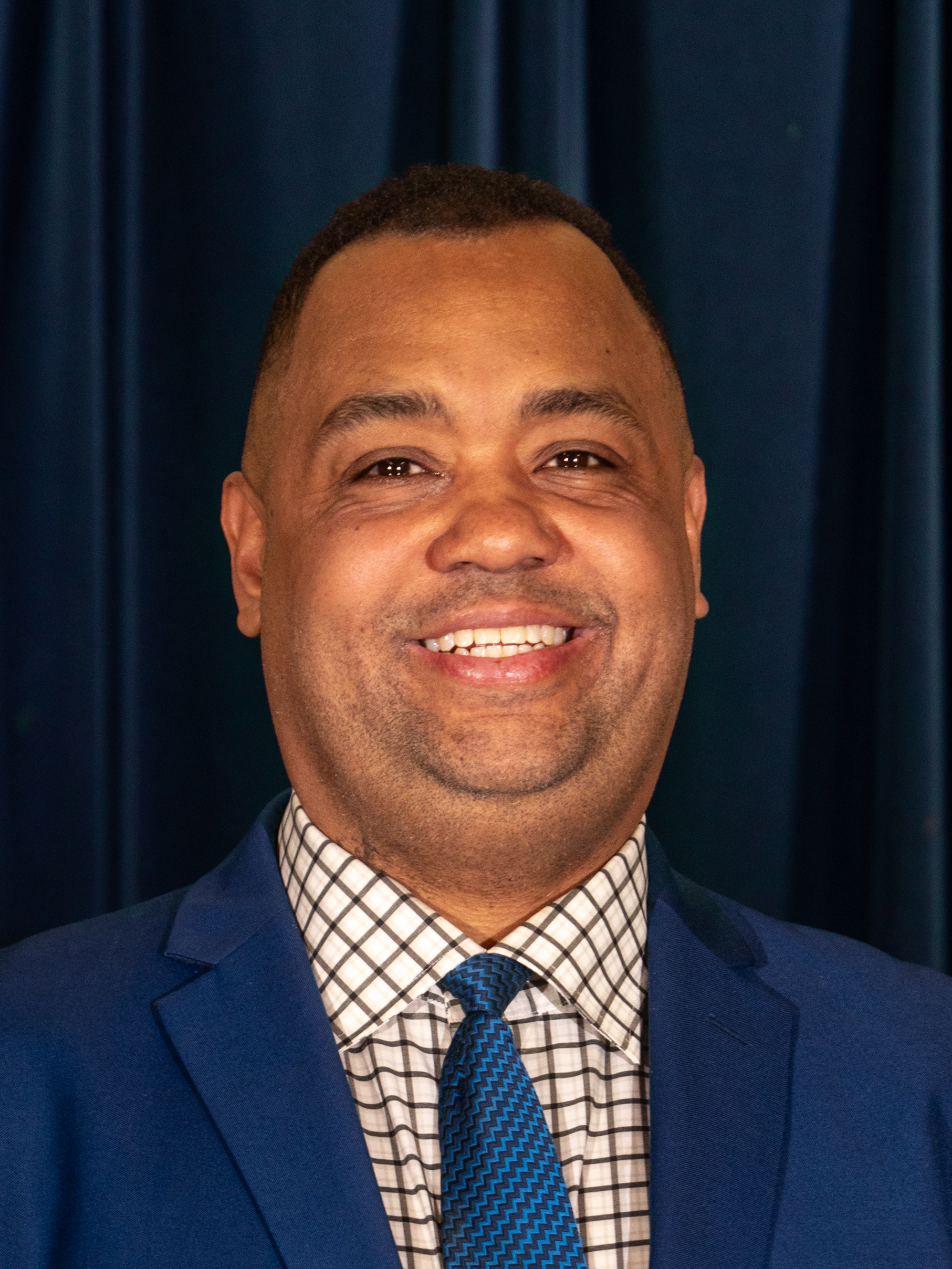
- Young in 2024

Member of the Detroit City Council from the at-large district
- Incumbent
- Assumed office January 1, 2022
- Preceded by: Janeé Ayers

Member of the Michigan Senate from the 1st district
- In office January 1, 2011 – January 1, 2019
- Preceded by: Hansen Clarke
- Succeeded by: Stephanie Chang

Member of the Michigan House of Representatives from the 4th district
- In office January 1, 2007 – December 31, 2010
- Preceded by: Mary D. Waters
- Succeeded by: Maureen Stapleton

Personal details
- Born: Joel Loving II; October 18, 1982 (age 43) Royal Oak, Michigan, U.S.
- Party: Democratic
- Relatives: Coleman Young (father)
- Website: State Senate website

Coleman Alexander Young II (born Joel Loving II; October 18, 1982) is an American Democratic politician who is a current member of the Detroit City Council and a former member of the Michigan Senate.

In the Michigan Senate, he represented the 1st district, which included the municipalities of Ecorse, Gibraltar, River Rouge, Riverview, Trenton, Woodhaven, Wyandotte and a portion of Detroit. From 2011 to 2014, Young served as the Senate Assistant Minority Caucus Chair and also served as the Senate Assistant Minority Floor Leader.

From 2007 to 2010, Young served as the representative in the 4th District of the Michigan House of Representatives. The 4th District was composed of the Lower East Side of Detroit, including a portion of Downtown and Midtown. During his time in the House, Young served as the vice chair of the Insurance Committee and sat on the Intergovernmental and Regional Affairs Committee, Labor Committee and Transportation Committee.

Young unsuccessfully ran in both the 2009 Detroit mayoral special election and the 2017 Detroit mayoral election, being the runner-up in the latter. In 2018, Young ran to represent Michigan's 13th U.S. Congressional district. The seat was vacant, due to the resignation of John Conyers. Young lost the primary to Rashida Tlaib, who won the general election. In 2022, Young was elected to the Detroit City Council.

== Personal life ==
Coleman Young II was born Joel Loving II in Royal Oak, Michigan. He is the only son of former Detroit Mayor Coleman Young and former Assistant Public Works Director Annivory Calvert. Young was raised in California, his father denying his existence until a paternity suit in 1989. In 2002, Young said he changed his name to Coleman Young II at the age of 13 to honor his father's legacy, but in 2017, Young claimed his name was changed to Joel Loving at the age of six. Young says he received a phone call from his father at the age of twelve wherein his father "basically asked [him] to carry on the name and the legacy".

In 2005, Young returned to Detroit. He is a member of St. Paul Church of God in Christ.

As of 2013, Young hosted a live call in show called The Young Effect.

== Education ==
Young graduated from P.A.L. Charter Academy High School in San Bernardino, California. After graduating High School, he enrolled at Azusa Pacific University, a private Christian college in Azusa, California. In 2005, Young transferred to Wayne State University, to complete his Bachelor of Arts in communications, and as of 2018, Young attends Wayne State as a part-time student.

== Political career ==
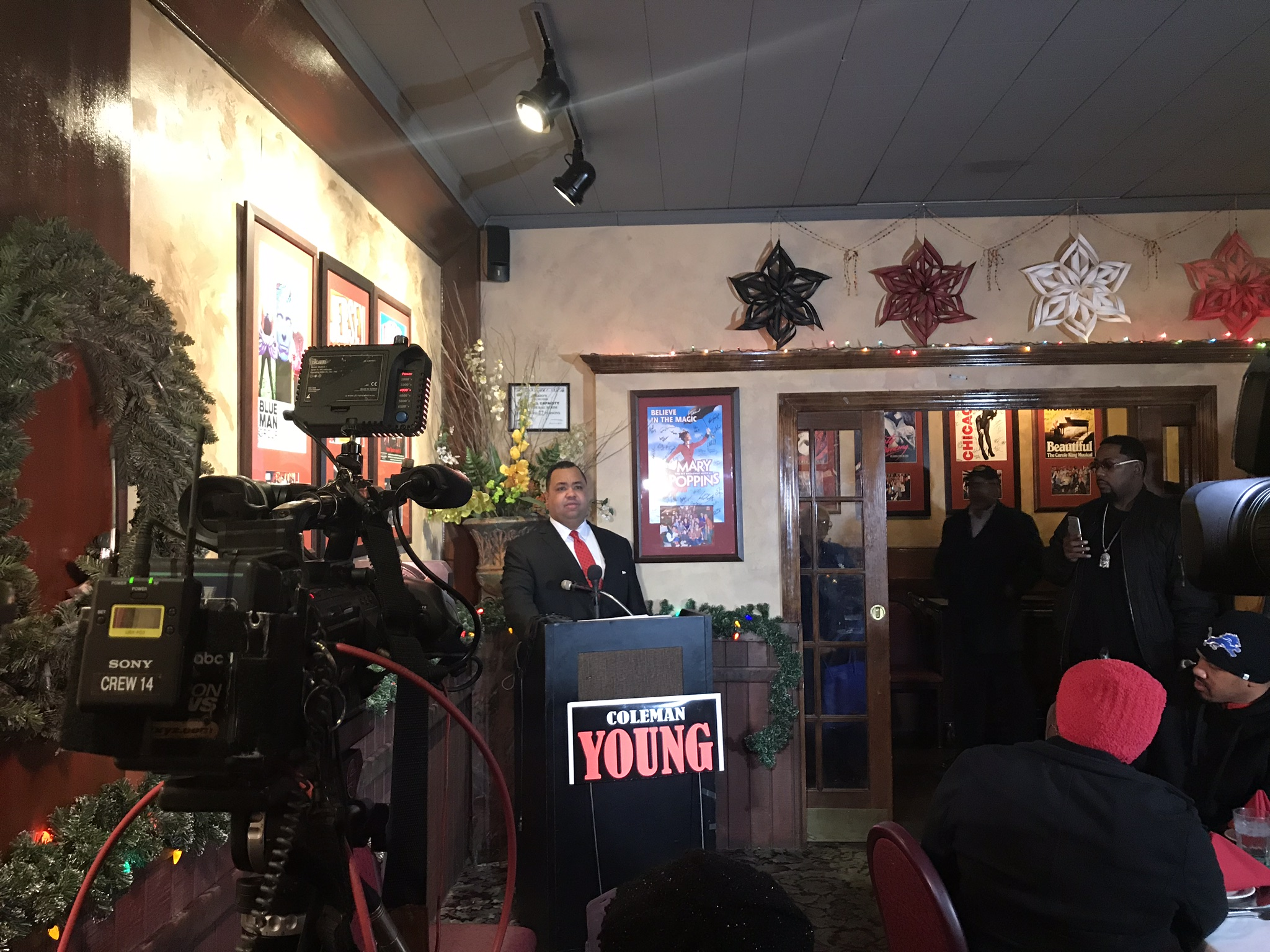
Coleman Young II announces his run for the 13th Congressional District

In 2005, Young worked as an intern for Detroit City Councilwoman JoAnn Watson. He has also worked for the Detroit City Council Research & Analysis Division.

In the 2006 Primary Election, Young ran to fill a vacancy in the 4th District of Michigan's House of Representatives.

In 2017, Young ran for Mayor of Detroit. He opened a debate by stating, "I'm Coleman Young the Second, and I’m asking you for your vote. It's time to take back the Motherland for the people." The Detroit Free Press considered the line "offensive" and an indication that Young was unfit to be mayor. "As he stood there, 35 and cocky, but seeming younger, he looked exactly like what he was: a former Subway sandwich employee who came to Detroit, did two political internships and already traded once on the name of his father, the inestimable and beloved Coleman Alexander Young, to run for office," wrote Rochelle Riley. Young was defeated by Mike Duggan, who received 72% of the vote against Young's 28%.

=== Legislative achievements ===
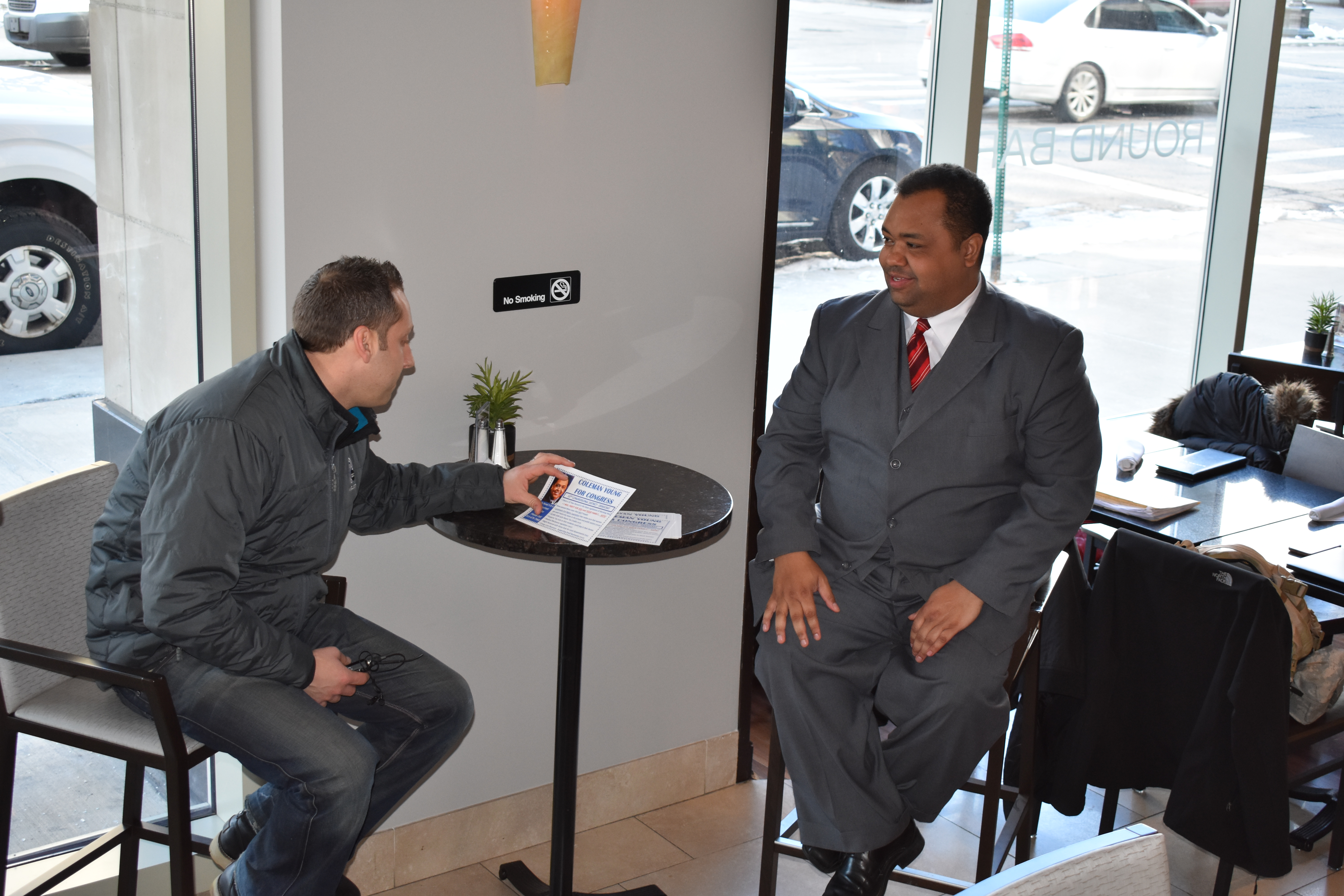
Coleman Young II interviews with Channel 4

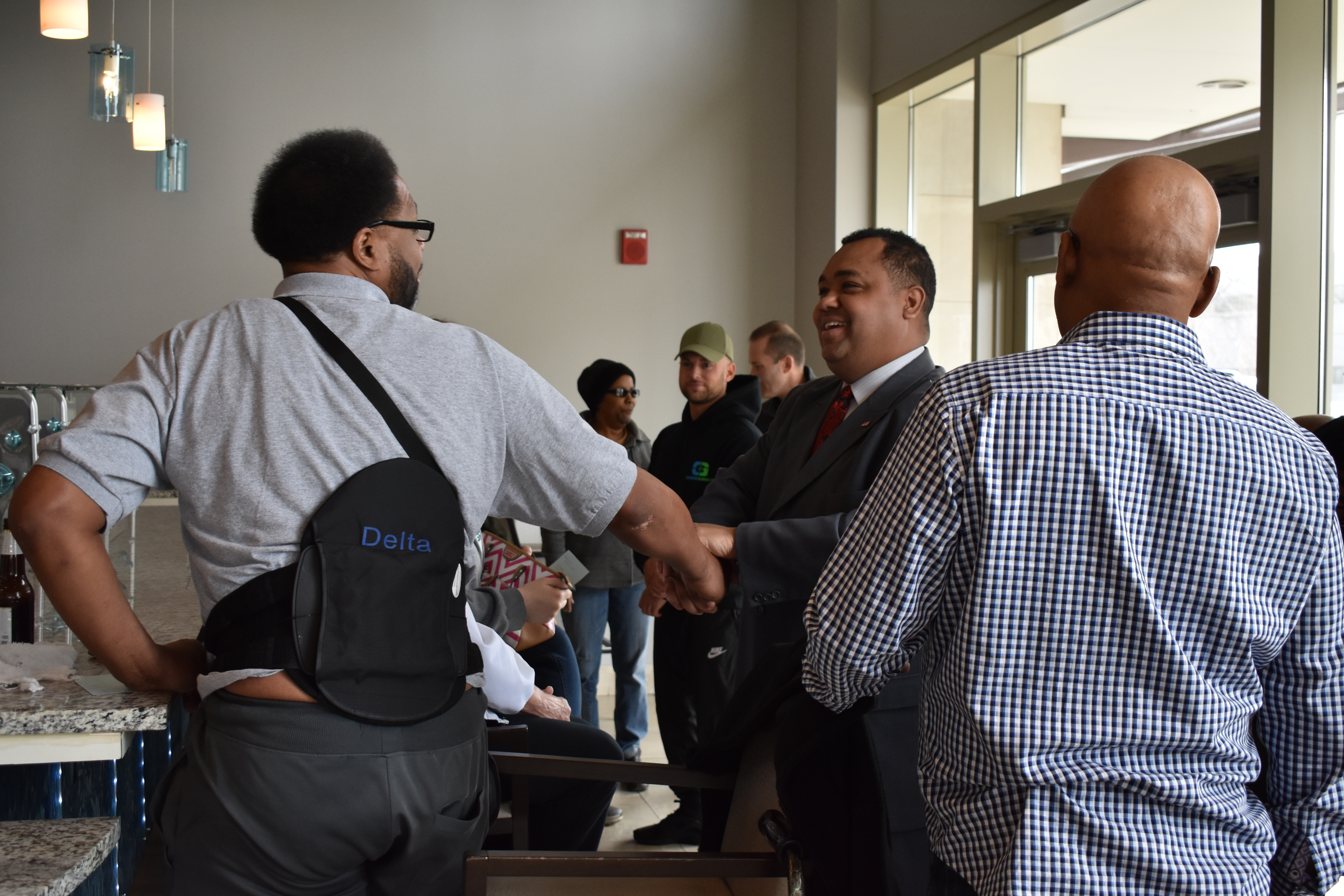
Senator Coleman Young II (D-Detroit) meets with marijuana dispensary owners in Detroit

In 2009, Young helped pass HB 4327, the Tisha Prater Act, which guarantees anti-discrimination protections for women affected by pregnancy, childbirth or related medical conditions. The legislation, named for Detroit Police Officer Tisha Prater, followed a 2008 Federal lawsuit filed when Prater was denied paid leave from work after she told the department that she was pregnant.

=== Electoral history ===
2006 Michigan 4th House District Democratic Primary Election
Party	Candidate	Votes	%
Democratic	Coleman Young II	2,450	34.7
Democratic	Maureen Stapleton	1,522	21.5
Democratic	Frazier Kimson	995	14.1
Democratic	Kimberly Hill	482	6.9
Democratic	Daniel Crockett	301	4.3
Democratic	Diane McMillan	236	3.3
Democratic	Patricia Scott	224	3.2
Democratic	Keith Hollowell	192	2.7
Democratic	Sharon King	142	2.0
Democratic	Christopher Collins	120	1.7
Democratic	Omari Barksdale	119	1.7
Democratic	Wanda Canty	78	1.1
Democratic	Ellen Logan	76	1.1
Democratic	Ron Liscombe	52	0.7
Democratic	Verl Pittman	51	0.7
Democratic	Tom Allison	23	0.3

2006 Michigan 4th House District General Election
Party	Candidate	Votes	%
Democratic	Coleman Young II	18,841	93.9
Republican	Scott Withington	1,223	6.1

2008 Michigan 4th House District Democratic Primary Election
Party	Candidate	Votes	%
Democratic	Coleman Young II (incumbent)	5,624	70.4
Democratic	Sheila Jackson	919	11.5
Democratic	Rita Jordan	546	6.8
Democratic	Willie Burton	450	5.6
Democratic	Wanda Canty	446	5.6

2009 Detroit Mayoral Primary Election
Candidate	Votes	%
Dave Bing	26,337	28.82
Kenneth Cockrel Jr. (incumbent)	24,677	27.00
Freman Hendrix	21,208	23.21
Warren Evans	9,193	10.06
Coleman Young II	3,744	4.10
Sharon McPhail	2,565	2.81
Nicholas Hood	2,077	2.27
Jerroll Sanders	336	0.37
D. Etta Wilcoxon	309	0.34
Brenda Sanders	199	0.22
Donald Bradley	157	0.17
Duane Montgomery	152	0.17
Stanley Michael Christmas	103	0.11
Joseph Holt	101	0.11
Frances Culver	87	0.10

2010 Michigan 1st Senate District Democratic Primary Election
Party	Candidate	Votes	%
Democratic	Coleman Young II	8,138	41.2
Democratic	Lisa Nuszkowski	5,701	28.9
Democratic	LaMar Lemmons	3,812	19.3
Democratic	Mary D. Waters	1,911	9.7
Democratic	Dobey Gavin	179	0.9

2010 Michigan 1st Senate District General Election
Party	Candidate	Votes	%
Democratic	Coleman Young II (incumbent)	40,122	93.3
Republican	Dakeisha Harwick	2,895	6.7

2014 Michigan 1st Senate District General Election
Party	Candidate	Votes	%
Democratic	Coleman Young II (incumbent)	48,510	71.8
Republican	Barry Berk	19,021	28.2

2017 Detroit Mayoral Primary Election
Candidate	Votes	%
Mike Duggan (incumbent)	43,535	67.69
Coleman Young II	17,180	26.71
Donna Marie Pitts	528	0.82
Edward D. Dean	433	0.67
Danetta L. Simpson	424	0.66
Curtis Christopher Greene	307	0.48
Angelo Brown	228	0.35
Articia Bomer	201	0.31

2017 Detroit Mayoral General Election
Candidate	Votes	%
Mike Duggan (incumbent)	72,450	72.0
Coleman Young II	28,164	28.0
