= Freman Hendrix =

American politician

Freman Hendrix (born October 12, 1950) is an American politician from the state of Michigan. A Democrat, Hendrix served as deputy mayor for former Detroit mayor Dennis Archer from 1997 to 2001. He ran twice, unsuccessfully, as a mayoral candidate in the city of Detroit: in 2005 against Mayor Kwame Kilpatrick, and for the 2009 special election called to replace the ousted Kilpatrick.

== History ==
The son of a black Army veteran, Emmanuel Freman Hendrix, and an Austrian-born woman, Rudolfine Ernegger, Hendrix was born in Inkster, Michigan, graduated from Inkster High School. He earned a bachelor's degree in business administration from Eastern Michigan University in 1982, became a member of Kappa Alpha Psi fraternity, and was initiated into the Delta Nu chapter at EMU; Hendrix served in the U.S. Navy for four years.

He later worked in the administration of former Wayne County executive Edward H. McNamara, and was himself elected to a two-year term as assistant county executive for Wayne County in 1991. He worked for Bill Clinton's presidential campaign in Michigan and managed Dennis Archer's successful mayoral campaign in 1994, serving as chief of staff from 1994 to 1997 and as deputy mayor of Detroit during Archer's second term. Mayor Archer concurrently named Hendrix chairman of the appointed Detroit School Board in 1999. He was among the 18 presidential electors chosen to cast Michigan's votes in the Electoral College for Democratic Party nominee Al Gore in 2000.

=== 2005 campaign ===
The city's major daily papers, the Detroit News and the Detroit Free Press, endorsed Hendrix. The alternative weekly, Metro Times, somewhat reluctantly endorsed Hendrix. Its editors deem Hendrix "has served the public without the taint of scandal, although soiled somewhat by his associations," and claims that as Archer's deputy, Hendrix bears some responsibility for the problems of the city that were still unsolved at the end of Archer's term. Interviewers from The South End asked Hendrix if he would consider a partnership of the city with the colleges of Detroit, to which he answered, "The short answer to that is yes, of course."

Hendrix won the August 2 primary election by a comfortable margin, with incumbent Mayor Kwame Kilpatrick coming in second. After a successful campaign by incumbent Kwame Kilpatrick, in which commercials that exposed Hendrix support of a state takeover of the Detroit Public Schools were run, Hendrix lost support throughout the Detroit Community. He ultimately lost to Kilpatrick in the controversial November 8, 2005, election by a margin of 47% to 53%.

Hendrix was named chief operating officer of Strategic Staffing Solutions and joined EMU in August 2006 as chief government relations officer, focusing on strengthening relationships with legislators in Lansing and Washington, D.C.

=== 2009 campaign ===
Hendrix officially announced a second formal campaign for mayor of Detroit at the EMU Student Government meeting on October 7, 2008. After an inquiry by Student Body Vice-President Robert Philip Kull about his plans, Hendrix revealed his plans as a way of pushing for "honesty, transparency, and accountability".^{2} Others who announced their candidacy were interim Mayor Ken Cockrel Jr., Sharon McPhail, Coleman Young II, Nicholas Hood III, and Dave Bing; Hendrix ultimately came in third in the February 24, 2009, primary behind Cockrel and Bing (who was elected mayor).

=== Charter Revision Commission ===
Hendrix was the top vote getter in the August 4, 2009 primary for a post in the Charter Revision Commission, receiving 11% of the vote. He resigned, however, from the commission on September 14, 2010, to join the Greektown Casino Hotel Board of Directors.

== Electoral history ==
- 2009 election for Charter Revision Commission (Detroit)
  - Freman Hendrix (D), 11%
  - Teola Pearl Hunter (D), 8%
  - Ken Coleman (D), 8%
  - Jenice Mitchell Ford (D), 7%
  - Reggie 'Reg' Davis (D), 6%
  - Rose Mary C. Robinson (D), 6%
  - Ken Harris (D), 6%
  - John Johnson (D), 6%
  - Cara J. Blount (D), 5%
- 2009 special election for mayor (Detroit) (primary election)
  - Dave Bing (D), 28.82%
  - Kenneth Cockrel, Jr (D), 27.00%
  - Freman Hendrix (D), 23.21%
  - Warren Evans (D), 10.06%
  - Coleman A. Young II (D), 4.10%
- 2005 race for mayor (Detroit)
  - Kwame Kilpatrick (D), 53%
  - Freman Hendrix (D), 47%
- 2005 race for mayor (Detroit) (primary election)
  - Freman Hendrix (D), 45%
  - Kwame Kilpatrick (D), 34%
  - Sharon McPhail (D), 12%
  - Hansen Clarke (D), 8%
