= 1997 Detroit mayoral election =

- November 4, 1997
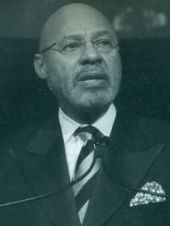

Candidate	Dennis Archer	Edward Vaughn
Party	Nonpartisan	Nonpartisan
Percentage	83%	17%
Mayor before election
Dennis Archer
Elected mayor
Dennis Archer

The 1997 Detroit mayoral election took place on November 4, 1997 in the city of Detroit. It saw the reelection of incumbent mayor Dennis Archer to a second term in a landslide victory. The election was preceded by a nonpartisan primary election held on September 9, 1997.

== Candidates ==
=== Ran ===
==== Advanced to the general election ====
- Dennis Archer, incumbent mayor and former associate justice of the Michigan Supreme Court
- Edward Vaughn, state senator and former state representative

==== Eliminated in the primary ====
- Rosa Garmendia

== Campaign ==
First-term incumbent mayor Dennis Archer was a strong front-runner in the election. Archer performed extremely well in the vote in the nonpartisan primary held on September 9, which narrowed the general election down to him and State Representative Ed Vaughn. Archer had received nearly ten times as many votes in the primary as Vaughn had. However, overall turnout was low in the primary. Archer had vastly outspent his opponents. Before the primary, Archer had spent $800,874 on his campaign while Vaughn spent approximately $16,000.

Archer was a popular incumbent. His campaign had a strong amount of funding. Archer's reputation with voters benefited from improvements in the city's economy and a sentiment that the city was making a comeback. He also benefited from a number of new construction projects in the city. These included the start of construction on a new baseball stadium for the Detroit Tigers, plans for three casinos, and plans for a new football stadium for the Detroit Lions. He also benefited from improved municipal services, decreases in crime and new private development in the city. Private investment in the city included the General Motors Corporation's purchase of Renaissance Center to serve as its new headquarters. Capitalizing off of a sentiment of optimism about the city's direction, Archer's campaign slogan was "The hope is real. The pride is back." Archer also benefited from receiving more newspaper coverage than Vaughn.

Lawyer Reginald Turner served as the head of Archer's campaign. He had previously been general counsel to Archers 1993 campaign. Archer's chief of staff, Freeman Hendrix, served as the director of his campaign.

Vaughn sought to cast Archer as a corporatist that was out of touch with the city's working class. During the campaign, Vaughn accused Archer of neglecting the most impoverished neighborhoods in the city. He also accused Vaughn of giving corporate interests control of the city, pointing to proposals by Archer of moving the city government's main offices to the General Motors Building and of permitting the Founders Society to manage the Detroit Institute of Arts.

== Endorsements ==
The editorial board of the Detroit Free Press endorsed Archer on September 5. They regarded Archer;'s term as having "more pluses than minuses". They wrote,

We recommend a strong vote for giving Dennis Archer a second term. He hasn't been a perfect mayor, and the progress surely isn't coming fast enough. But he, far more than Mr. Vaughn, seems able to lead the city toward better time and solid progress. On that basis, we think he deserve re-election.

== Polls ==
=== Primary election ===
Poll source	Date(s) administered	Sample (Note: Key: A – all adults RV – registered voters LV – likely voters V – unclear)	Margin of error	Dennis Archer	Rosa C. Garmendia	Ed Vaughan	Others
EPIC/MRA for Detroit Free Press, WDIV-TV, WXYZ-TV	June 19, 2001	1,000	± 3%	87%	1%	9%	3%

== Results ==
=== Primary election ===
1997 Detroit mayoral primary election Nonpartisan election
Candidate	Votes	%
Dennis Archer (incumbent)	85,540	82.26
Edward Vaughn	16,512	15.88
Rosa Garmendia	1,939	1.86
Total votes	103,991	100

=== General election ===
Archer received 83% of the vote, while Vaughn received 17% of the vote. Archer's victory was the largest in a Detroit mayoral election since Louis Miriani received 85% of the vote over John J. Beck in the 1957 election. Voter turnout was under 30%.
