= Dave Bing =

American basketball player and politician (born 1943)

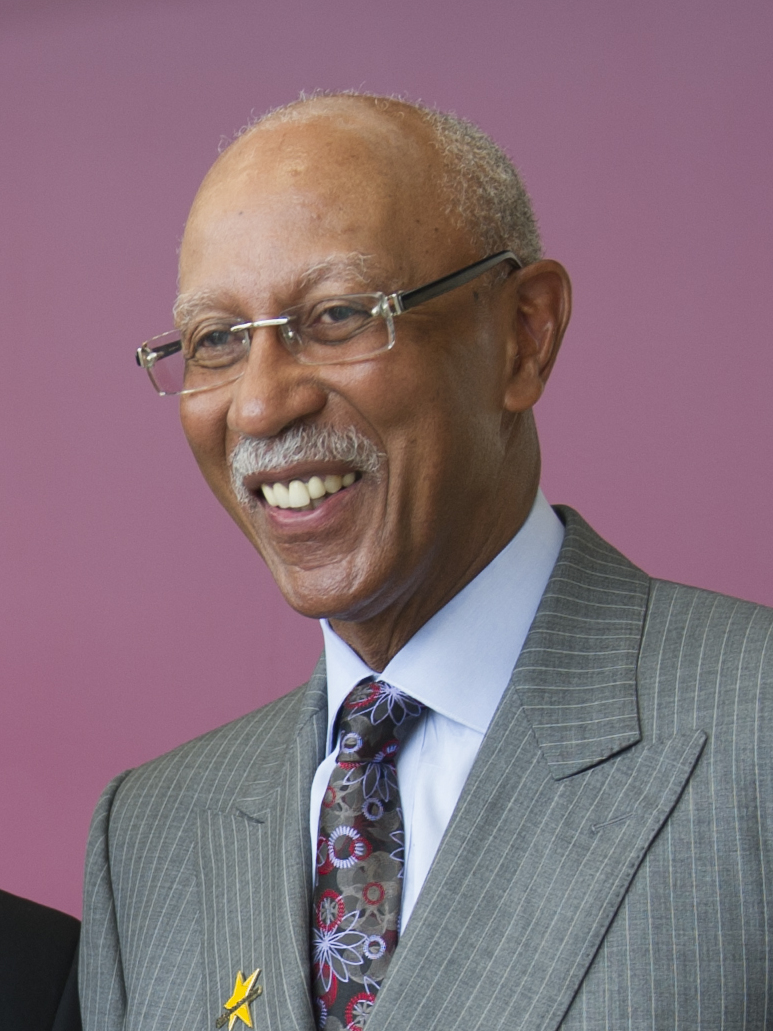
- Bing in 2011

74th Mayor of Detroit
- In office May 11, 2009 – January 1, 2014
- Preceded by: Kenneth Cockrel Jr.
- Succeeded by: Mike Duggan

Personal details
- Born: November 24, 1943 (age 82) Washington, D.C., U.S.
- Party: Democratic
- Spouse: Yvette Bing
- Children: 3
- Education: Syracuse University
- Profession: Professional athlete, businessman, politician
- Basketball career

Personal information
- Listed height: 6 ft 3 in (1.91 m)
- Listed weight: 180 lb (82 kg)

Career information
- High school: Spingarn (Washington, D.C.)
- College: Syracuse (1963–1966)
- NBA draft: 1966: 1st round, 2nd overall pick
- Drafted by: Detroit Pistons
- Playing career: 1966–1978
- Position: Point guard
- Number: 21, 44

Career history
- 1966–1975: Detroit Pistons
- 1975–1977: Washington Bullets
- 1977–1978: Boston Celtics

Career highlights
- 7× NBA All-Star (1968–1969, 1971, 1973–1976); NBA All-Star Game MVP (1976); 2× All-NBA First Team (1968, 1971); All-NBA Second Team (1974); NBA Rookie of the Year (1967); NBA All-Rookie Team (1967); NBA scoring champion (1968); NBA anniversary team (50th, 75th); No. 21 retired by Detroit Pistons; Consensus first-team All-American (1966); Third-team All-American – NABC (1965); No. 22 retired by Syracuse Orange

Career statistics
- Points: 18,327 (20.3 ppg)
- Rebounds: 3,420 (3.8 rpg)
- Assists: 5,397 (6.0 apg)
- Stats at NBA.com
- Stats at Basketball Reference
- Basketball Hall of Fame
- Collegiate Basketball Hall of Fame

David Bing (born November 24, 1943) is an American former professional basketball player, businessman and politician who served as the 74th mayor of Detroit from 2009 to 2014. He is a member of the Democratic Party.

After starring at Syracuse University, Bing played 12 seasons in the National Basketball Association (NBA) as a point guard for the Detroit Pistons (1966–1975), Washington Bullets (1975–1977) and Boston Celtics (1977–78). During his career, he averaged over 20 points and six assists per game and made seven NBA All-Star Game appearances, winning the game's Most Valuable Player award in 1976. The Pistons celebrated his career accomplishments with the retirement of his #21 jersey. In addition, he was elected to the Naismith Memorial Basketball Hall of Fame and named to the NBA 50th Anniversary All-Time Team and the NBA 75th Anniversary All-Time Team.

Bing founded Bing Steel, a processing company that earned him the National Minority Small Business Person of the Year award in 1984. The business grew into the multimillion-dollar Detroit-based conglomerate, the Bing Group, one of the largest steel companies in Michigan.

Bing entered Detroit politics as a Democrat in 2008, announcing his intention to run for mayor in the city's non-partisan primary to finish the term of Kwame Kilpatrick, who had resigned amid a corruption scandal. After winning the primary, Bing then defeated Interim Mayor Kenneth Cockrel Jr. and was sworn in as mayor in May 2009. Later that year, Bing was re-elected to a full term. In 2013, Bing lost most of his power as mayor to Detroit's emergency manager Kevyn Orr. Also having numerous health problems, and suffering approval ratings as low as 14%, Bing did not seek re-election that year, and was succeeded as mayor by politician and businessman Mike Duggan.

== Early life ==
Bing was born November 24, 1943, in Washington, D.C., to mother Juanita, a housekeeper, and father Hasker, a bricklayer and deacon for the local Baptist church. He was the second child of four living in a two-bedroom, one-story house in the northeast part of town. In his childhood, Bing received the nickname "Duke" from his father, because, according to Bing, he always "wanted to be top dog." He suffered a traumatic eye injury at age five, when, while playing with an improvised hobby horse he constructed with two sticks nailed together; Bing tripped and accidentally poked his left eye with a rusty nail. The family could not afford emergency surgery, leaving the eye to heal on its own and diminishing his vision thereafter. Bing's father also suffered a severe head injury during the boy's childhood. While working a construction site, a brick fell four stories onto his head, causing a brain clot. The episode led young Bing to promise himself that he would never work in such a profession.

In athletics, Bing played basketball, but older children often told him he was too small for the game. However, he played well, triumphing over such older and bigger children as future Motown musician Marvin Gaye, who, after not performing well on the court, chose to sing on the sidelines. Bing and Gaye forged a friendship, which continued later in life. Despite his basketball play, Bing, a fan of the Brooklyn Dodgers and Jackie Robinson, focused primarily on baseball, the neighborhood's preferred game.

Despite his fuzzy vision, he excelled in baseball at Spingarn High School, where he enrolled in 1958. Nevertheless, the school's head basketball coach William Roundtree encouraged him to revisit basketball. Roundtree became a fatherly figure to Bing, who decided to join the team. He developed into a double-digits per game scorer, noted for his jump shot and knack for driving to the basket. He continued also to compete in baseball into his senior year, but was forced to choose between it and basketball when a scheduling conflict between two tournaments arose. Though he felt he was better at baseball, Bing opted for basketball, believing it gave him a greater chance at a full-ride college scholarship, well aware of the path taken by Los Angeles Lakers forward Elgin Baylor, a Spingarn alum. At the tournament, Bing led his team to victory and earned MVP honors. All in all, in high school, Bing was a three-year letter winner, all–Inter High, all-Metro, and all-East member. In 1962, he was featured in Parade magazine and made the All-American Team.

== College career ==
Bing attended Syracuse University, where he was once roommates with Jim Boeheim. He wore a No. 22 jersey in college, as he had in high school, as a homage to Elgin Baylor, who he had watched play on a playground court in Washington, D.C. as a boy in 1957. He led the Orangemen in scoring as a sophomore (22.2) in 1964, as a junior (23.2) in 1965, and as a senior (28.4) in 1966. During his senior year, Bing was fifth in the nation in scoring and was Syracuse's first consensus All-American in 39 years. He was also named to The Sporting News All-America First Team and was named Syracuse Athlete of the Year.

In his three-year varsity career at Syracuse, Bing averaged 24.8 points and 10.3 rebounds, with 1883 total points and 786 total rebounds in 76 games.

While attending Syracuse, he became acquainted with Joe Biden, who was as student in the law school. Biden would later serve as a U.S. senator, vice president, and president of the United States.

== Professional career ==
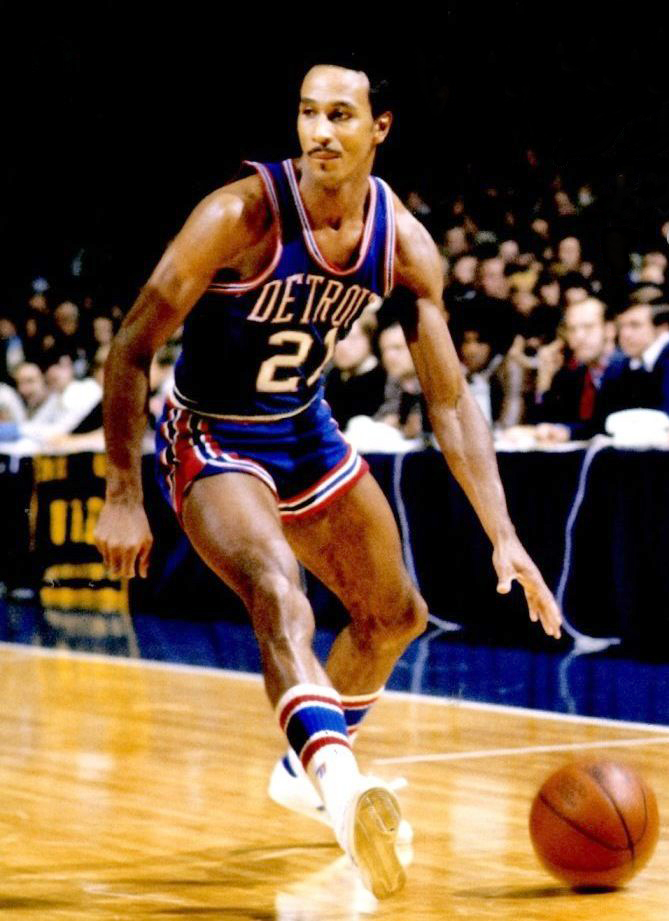
Bing playing for the Detroit Pistons, c. 1975

Bing's playing style was somewhat unusual for the time. As a lean, athletic and explosive point guard, he functioned as the playmaker distributing the ball, but also did more shooting and scoring than most others who had this position. At one time a joke about him and his backcourt partner, Jimmy Walker, was that it was a shame they could only play the game with one ball at a time.

=== Detroit Pistons (1966–1975) ===
Bing was selected 2nd overall in the 1966 NBA draft by the Detroit Pistons, and wore the jersey number 21 because player-coach Dave DeBusschere already wore No. 22. Bing scored 1,601 points (20.0 points per game), and won the 1967 NBA Rookie of the Year Award while also being named to the NBA All-Rookie First Team. The next year, he led the NBA in scoring with 2,142 points (27.1 points per game) in 1968.

On November 23, 1968, Bing recorded a triple-double of 39 points, 16 rebounds and 10 assists in a 127–128 loss to the Baltimore Bullets.

Bing sat out 2½ months of the 1971–72 season due to a detached retina incurred from a preseason game against the Los Angeles Lakers, playing in only 45 games that season. While with the Pistons, he played in six NBA All-Star Games (1968, 1969, 1971, 1973–1975), and was named to the All-NBA First Team in 1968 and 1971.

=== Washington Bullets (1975–1977) ===
After leaving the Detroit Pistons, Bing went on to spend his next two seasons with the Washington Bullets, for whom he was named an NBA All-Star once more in 1976, this time winning the game's MVP Award.

=== Boston Celtics (1977–1978) ===
He played his final season with the Boston Celtics, averaging 13.6 points. He then retired at the conclusion of the 1977–1978 season.

Overall, in his NBA career, Bing averaged 20.3 points, 6.0 assists and 3.8 rebounds in 901 games over 12 NBA seasons, scoring 18,327 points with 5,397 assists.

== National Basketball Retired Players Association ==
In 1992, Bing co-founded the National Basketball Retired Players Association. As of 2024, he continues to serve on its board of directors.

== Business career ==
At age 22 with an NBA contract worth $15,000, Bing was rebuffed by the National Bank of Detroit on getting a mortgage to finance a home. This led Bing to work at the bank during the offseason, holding jobs in the teller, customer relations, and mortgage departments.

Immediately after retiring, he worked at a warehouse of the steel processing company Paragon Steel and was paid $35,000. He left after two years, after stints in the company's shipping and sales operations.

=== Bing Steel ===
In 1980, Bing opened Bing Steel with four employees in a rented warehouse from $250,000 in loans and $80,000 of his own money. Losing all his money in six months, the company shied away from manufacturing to focus on being a middleman. With General Motors as their first major client, the company turned a profit in its second year on revenues of $4.2 million. By 1984, Bing was awarded by President Ronald Reagan the National Minority Small Business Person of the Year. By 1985, Bing Steel had expanded to two plants with 63 employees posting revenues of $40 million. Company assets were sold off in 2009.

=== The Bing Group ===
Bing Steel transformed itself to the Bing Group, a conglomerate with headquarters located in Detroit's North End. The company, among other things, supplies metal stampings to the automobile industry.

At the 1990 NBA All-Star Game, Bing received the Schick Achievement Award for his work after his NBA career.

== Early political involvement and activism ==
Bing was an early political supporter of Kwame Kilpatrick. However, Bing was among the first Michigan business community leaders to urge the resignation of Kilpatrick from his office as mayor of Detroit when Major scandals emerged in his second term. Kilpatrick ultimately resigned as mayor in September 2008.

Bing led Detroit's effort to receive the rights to host the 2004 Democratic National Convention. In November 2002, Detroit lost to Boston. The Detroit bid's weak spot was considered to be its smaller number of hotel rooms compared to other cities seeking to host the 2004 convention.

In January 2009, on Martin Luther King Jr. Day, Bing received the National Civil Rights Museum Sports Legacy Award. The award honors King's legacy as a leader of the civil rights movement, by acknowledging athletes who have made significant contributions to civil and human rights and who helped establish a foundation for future leaders in athletic careers. The honor was to be presented during the half-time show of the game between the Memphis Grizzlies and the Detroit Pistons in Memphis, Tennessee.

Bing volunteered in the Big Brothers Big Sisters of America program.

== Mayoralty ==
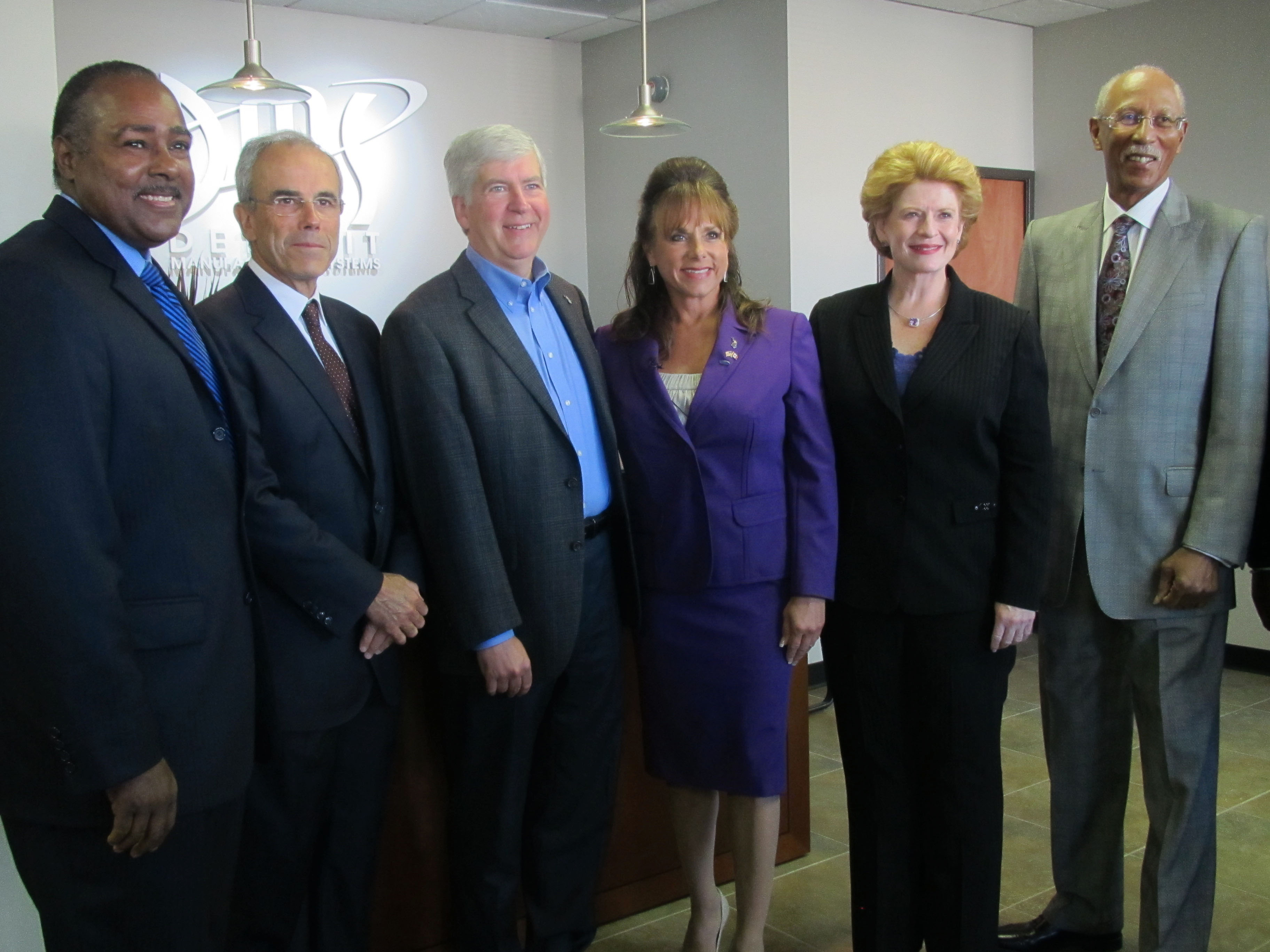
Bing attending the August 2012 groundbreaking ceremony for a new Detroit Manufacturing Systems facility L-R: Ford Motor Company VP Tony Brown, Faurecia CEO Yann Delabrière, Michigan Governor Rick Snyder, Rush Trucking CEO Andra Rush, U.S. Senator Debbie Stabenow, and Bing

=== 2009 elections ===
On October 16, 2008, Bing announced that he would be a candidate for mayor of Detroit in the 2009 Detroit mayoral special election to finish the term of Kwame Kilpatrick, who had resigned as part of a plea bargain agreement after being charged with the crime of perjury. Bing finished first in a 15 candidate non-partisan primary on February 24, 2009. On May 5, 2009, Bing was elected with 52.3% of the vote, defeating interim mayor Kenneth Cockrel Jr., who received 47.7%. Bing had only moved to a residence within city limits shortly before his campaign for mayor, having previously resided in suburban Franklin, Michigan.

Bing was reelected to a full term on November 3, 2009. The inauguration for his full term was held at the Fox Theatre.

=== Leadership style ===
In comparison to his predecessor Kwame Kilpatrick, Bing opted for a more low-key presence as mayor and opted to forgo enjoying many of the benefits to which the mayor was entitled. Bing additionally forwent accepting salary as mayor during at least his first year as mayor. Bing did not shy away from making decisions that were unpopular.

=== Fiscal and economic matters ===
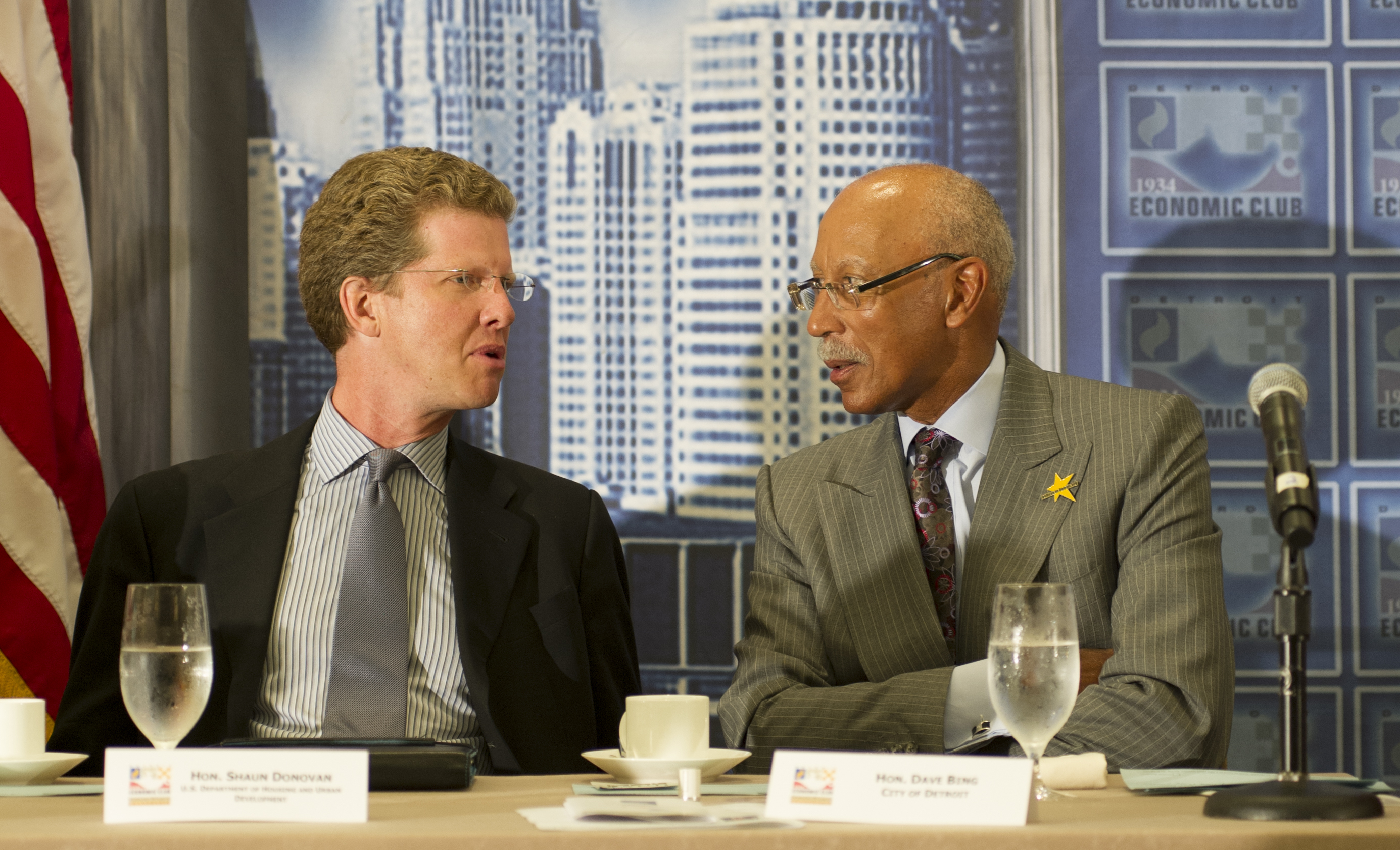
Bing (right) with U.S. Secretary of Housing and Urban Development Shaun Donovan at the Detroit Economic Club in 2011

When Bing took office, the city was suffering significant economic trouble and its government was suffering major fiscal trouble. The city was suffering a $30 million budget deficit. The city also had overall accumulated $332 million in deficit, more than $15 million in long-term liabilities. The city government's fiscal troubles persisted under Bing, with Detroit suffering increased budget deficits during much of his tenure. However, by the time he left office, the city's deficit had decreased by $7 million from where it stood when he assumed office.

Due to the importance of the automotive industry to Detroit, Bing was involved in discussions related to the 2009 auto bailout. These discussions also included Vice President Joe Biden, who Bing had first known when they were students at Syracuse University.

In 2011, Bing proposed that the city's next budget include a $4 million decrease in funding for City Council staff, and fund new hires for the city's fire department. In mid-2011, Bing vetoed the budget passed by the City Council, claiming its cuts were excessive and could be to the detriment of the services of the city's police and fire departments. The City Council's budget made $50 million more in cuts than Bing's initial proposed budget had made. Bing's budget proposal was for $3.1 billion in spending. The City Council overrode this veto in an 8–1 vote. The city's 2012 budget made a 20% decrease to the city's fire department. This has been seen as having a detrimental effect on the city's ability to handle fires, including arson. In mid-2012, the fire department announced 164 layoffs. In 2013, Bing proposed a $1 billion budget, a $300 million decrease from the previous year's budget.

By the time he was reelected to a full term, Bing had dismissed more than 400 city employees and had ended 16 out of 51 contracts that the city had with trade unions. Bing faced protests by unions during his mayoralty. By the end of his mayoralty, Bing had eliminated 1,000 positions in the city government, a 9% decrease to the municipal workforce. Additionally, many city employees faced decreased salaries, decreased benefits, and even furloughs. Bing also outsourced many roles of the city government. The city's public health department was replaced by the Institution for Population Health public-private partnership. The workforce-development department was replaced by Detroit Employment Solutions, a nonprofit organization. Management of payroll and benefits for city employees was also outsourced.

The city enjoyed new private development over the course of Bing's tenure. This included both the opening of new small businesses, an investment of $198 million by Chrysler in its Mack Avenue Engine Plant (which created 250 new jobs), and significant development in the city's downtown by businessman Dan Gilbert.

=== Blight management ===
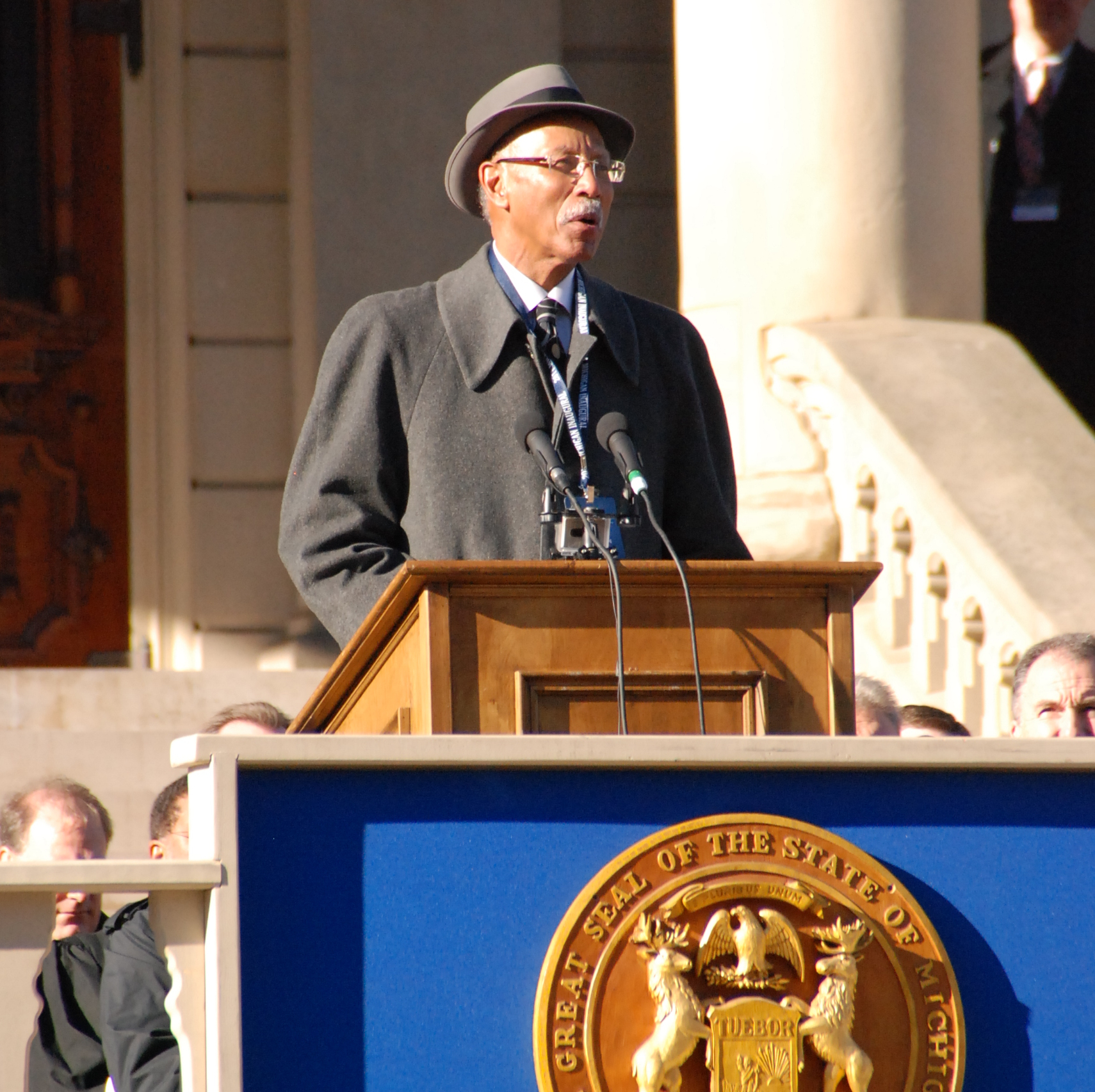
Bing speaking at the 2011 inauguration of Governor Rick Snyder

Bing proposed the idea of demolishing neighborhoods and decreasing city services. Bing spoke of his intention to depopulate neighborhoods, including through forcible means such as eminent domain. This was controversial among city residents. Bing sought to incentivize residents to relocate from largely depopulated neighborhoods so that those neighborhoods could be demolished and the public services could be consolidated to more densely populated areas of the city. Past mayors had made pledges to demolish abandoned homes but taken little action to do so. Under Bing, the city took action to demolish abandoned homes, reporting in early 2013 to have demolished 6,700 since Bing took office. However, the city still had tens of thousands more abandoned homes. Bing's program of demolishing abandoned homes was controversial with some city residents. Aiming to repopulate certain neighborhoods, in early 2011 Bing began a program to give $150,000 in grants to assist in renovations of foreclosed homes in select neighborhoods. Hoping to encourage members of the city's police force to reside within city limits, Bing only required police officers to place a mere $1,000 in order to acquire abandoned residences and be eligible for renovation grants.

Bing launched the Detroit Works Project (later renamed Detroit Future City), an effort to create a 50-year outline for the city's future. The project was intended to create a community-planned vision for how the city would manage its problems. The city government underestimated how many citizens would attend community meetings. Controversy arose during the process, when Bing publicized his intention to depopulate certain neighborhoods by forcibly relocating residents to denser neighborhoods. The public anger at this threatened the project.

Bing sought to fix the city's broken street lights, which were considered a serious problem. In 2012, Bing persuaded the state legislature and governor to create the Public Lighting Authority of Detroit and dedicate utility and income tax revenue for the $185 million in bonds for this purpose. Bing appointed a lighting authority board, which then signed a contract with DTE Energy to repair the city's streetlights. However, the contract did not take place until early 2013, by which time Bing had left office. Bing's successor Mike Duggan built upon Bing's efforts to repair the city's streetlights to significant success. It has been noted that, due to Bing being out of office when the work was carried out, he has not received much public credit for it.

=== Policing and crime ===
During Bing's tenure, there was trouble within the Detroit Police Department. This included instability in leadership, with the city cycling through four different police chiefs during Bing's less-than-5-years in office. While he gave no explicit reason for the firing, it was speculated that Bing dismissed the first police chief of his mayoralty, Warren Evans, both due to the police raid that resulted in the killing of Aiyana Jones and due to Bing's dissatisfaction with Warren's pursuit of media exposure through participation in reality television shows such as The First 48. Even as crime in large cities was declining overall in the United States, Detroit saw its homicide rate rise to a 20-year high in 2012.

=== Other projects ===
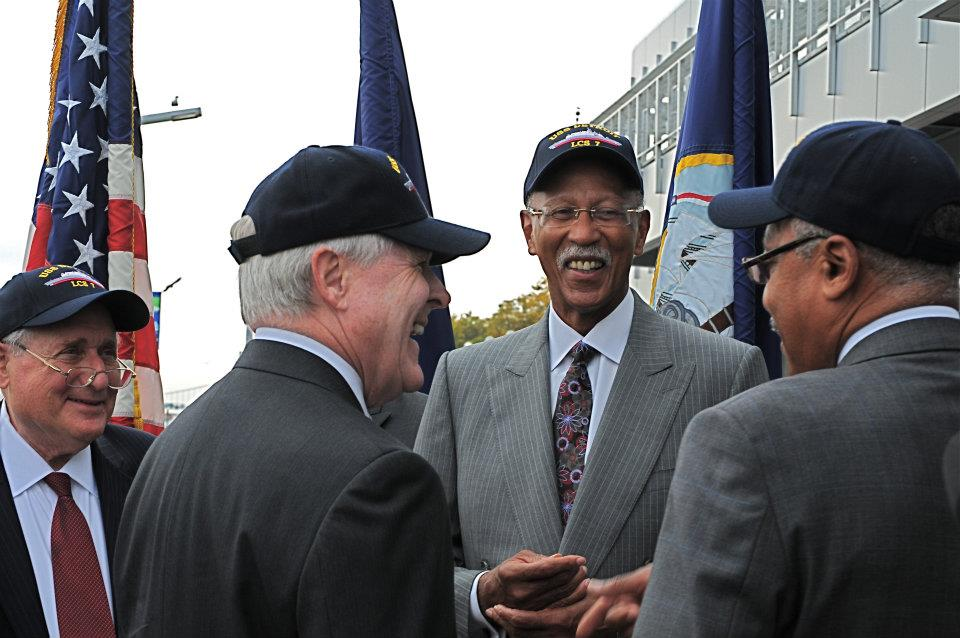
Bing (center right) with Senator Carl Levin (far left) and Secretary of the Navy Ray Mabus (center left) at the 2011 naming ceremony for USS Detroit (LCS-7)

Early into his mayoralty, Bing began pursuing a renovation of Cobo Center, the city's main convention center. Renovation occurred while Bing was mayor, taking place under the management of a new cooperative governing authority for the convention center.

Bing established the city's Active and Safe Campaign public-private partnership to raise funds for public safety initiatives, as well as raise funds for recreational programs and enhancements to the city's recreation facilities.

Bing made an unpopular proposal to decrease city bus service on Sundays. This never came into fruition.

=== Emergency management and municipal bankruptcy ===
On March 1, 2013, Governor Rick Snyder announced that he would appoint an emergency manager for the city of Detroit due to the city's fiscal troubles, making Detroit the United States largest city's to be placed under emergency management. Bing had, in the years prior, warned that this was a possibility, and expressed his desire for the city to avert such a situation. The placement of the city under emergency management deprived Bing of much of his mayoral authority. Bing declared that while he opposed emergency management, he was willing to work collaboratively with the emergency manager that would be appointed. Kevyn Orr was soon after appointed to the emergency manager role. Many in the city criticized Bing for not being more resistant to emergency management.

In July 2013, before Bing left office, Detroit became the largest city in United States history to declare municipal bankruptcy. This was the decision of emergency manager Kevin Orr. Many criticized Bing for not doing more to fight this move by Orr.

=== Decision to forgo seeking reelection in 2013 ===
In addition to losing authority to the emergency manager, Bing suffered numerous health problems, and had seen approval ratings as low as 14%. He announced on May 14, 2013, he would not run for reelection to another term in the election to be held later that year.

== Later activities ==
In 2014, Bing launched the Bing Youth Initiative, a nonprofit with a mission focused on providing academic support as well as behavior and social wellness services to underprivileged young African American men in Detroit.

In August 2023, Bing endorsed Elissa Slotkin's candidacy for the 2024 United States Senate election in Michigan.

== Personal life ==
Bing is the godfather of Jalen Rose. In 2020, Bing published his autobiography titled Attacking the Rim.

== Honors ==
- J. Walter Kennedy Citizenship Award (1977)
- Naismith Memorial Basketball Hall of Fame (inducted in 1990)
- Named one of the 50 Greatest Players in NBA History (1996)
- College Basketball Hall of Fame (inducted in 2006)
- NBA 75th Anniversary Team (2021)
- Syracuse Orange Ring of Honor (added in 2024)

== NBA career statistics ==
Legend
GP	Games played	GS	Games started	MPG	Minutes per game
FG%	Field goal percentage	3P%	3-point field goal percentage	FT%	Free throw percentage
RPG	Rebounds per game	APG	Assists per game	SPG	Steals per game
BPG	Blocks per game	PPG	Points per game	**Bold**	Career high

=== Regular season ===
Year	Team	GP	MPG	FG%	FT%	RPG	APG	STL	BLK	PPG
1966–67	Detroit	80	34.5	.436	.738	4.5	4.1	—	—	20.0
1967–68	Detroit	79	40.6	.441	.707	4.7	6.4	—	—	**27.1**
1968–69	Detroit	77	39.5	.425	.713	**5.0**	7.1	—	—	23.4
1969–70	Detroit	70	33.3	.444	.783	4.3	6.0	—	—	22.9
1970–71	Detroit	**82**	37.4	**.467**	.797	4.4	5.0	—	—	27.0
1971–72	Detroit	45	**43.0**	.414	.785	4.1	7.0	—	—	22.6
1972–73	Detroit	**82**	41.0	.448	.814	3.6	**7.8**	—	—	22.4
1973–74	Detroit	81	38.6	.436	.813	3.5	6.9	1.3	0.2	18.8
1974–75	Detroit	79	40.8	.434	.809	3.6	7.7	**1.5**	**0.3**	19.0
1975–76	Washington	**82**	35.9	.447	.787	2.9	6.0	1.4	**0.3**	16.2
1976–77	Washington	64	23.7	.454	.773	2.2	4.3	1.0	0.1	10.6
1977–78	Boston	80	28.2	.449	**.824**	2.7	3.8	1.0	0.2	13.6
Career		901	36.4	.441	.775	3.8	6.0	1.3	0.2	20.3
All-Star		7	17.9	.372	1.000	2.3	2.3	0.0	0.0	5.9

=== Playoffs ===
Year	Team	GP	MPG	FG%	FT%	RPG	APG	STL	BLK	PPG
1968	Detroit	6	42.3	.410	.733	**4.0**	4.8	—	—	**28.2**
1974	Detroit	7	44.6	.420	.733	3.7	6.0	0.4	0.1	18.9
1975	Detroit	3	**44.7**	.426	.615	3.7	**9.7**	**1.7**	0.0	16.0
1976	Washington	7	29.9	**.447**	.800	2.6	4.0	1.0	**0.3**	13.7
1977	Washington	**8**	6.9	.438	**1.000**	0.8	0.6	0.0	0.1	4.0
Career		31	31.1	.423	.748	2.7	4.3	0.6	0.2	15.4

== Electoral history ==
2009 Detroit mayoral special primary election results
Candidate	Votes	%	±
Dave Bing	26,337	28.82	
Ken Cockrel, Jr. (incumbent)	24,677	27.00	
Freman Hendrix	21,208	23.21	
Warren Evans	9,193	10.06	
Coleman Young II	3,744	4.10	
Sharon McPhail	2,565	2.81	
Nicholas Hood III	2,077	2.27	
Jerroll Sanders	336	0.37	
D. Etta Wilcoxon	309	0.34	
Brenda Sanders	199	0.22	
Donald Bradley	157	0.17	
Duane Montgomery	152	0.17	
Write-In	136	0.15	
Stanley Michael Christmas	103	0.11	
Joseph Holt	101	0.11	
Frances Culver	87	0.10	

2009 Detroit mayoral special election
Candidate	Votes	%	±
Dave Bing	49,054	52%	+23%
Ken Cockrel, Jr. (incumbent)	44,770	48%	+22%

2009 Detroit mayoral primary election
Candidate	Votes	%	±
Dave Bing (incumbent)	68,623	73.90	
Tom Barrow	10,302	11.09	
Jerroll Sanders	9,322	10.04	
Duane Montgomery	1,911	2.06	
Dartagnan M. Collier	1,265	1.36	
Bob Allman	873	0.94	
Write-In	566	0.61	

2009 Detroit mayoral election
Candidate	Votes	%	±
Dave Bing (incumbent)	70,060	56%	−18%
Tom Barrow	50,757	41%	+30%
Write-In	3,849	3%	+3%

Political offices
Preceded by Kenneth Cockrel, Jr.	Mayor of Detroit; 2009–2013	Succeeded by Mike Duggan
