= 2010 Wayne County Executive election =

- November 2, 2010
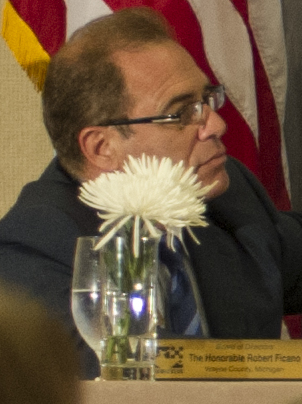

Nominee	Robert A. Ficano	Mario Nesr Fundarski
Party	Democratic	Republican
Popular vote	381,791	125,849
Percentage	74.91%	24.69%
Wayne County Executive before election
Robert A. Ficano
Democratic
Elected Wayne County Executive
Robert A. Ficano
Democratic

The 2010 Wayne County Executive election was held on November 2, 2010. Incumbent County Executive Robert A. Ficano ran for re-election to his third term. He faced no opposition in the Democratic primary and faced Mario Nesr Fundarski, a businessman and the Republican nominee, in the general election. Ficano defeated Fundarski in a landslide, winning 75 percent of the vote.

== Democratic primary ==
=== Candidates ===
- Robert A. Ficano, incumbent County Executive

=== Results ===
Democratic primary results
Party	Candidate	Votes	%
Democratic	Robert A. Ficano (inc.)	113,251	98.83%
Democratic	Write-ins	1,343	1.17%
Total votes		114,594	100.00%

== Republican primary ==
=== Candidates ===
- Mario Nesr Fundarski, Dearborn businessman, perennial candidate

=== Results ===
Republican primary results
Party	Candidate	Votes	%
Republican	Mario Nesr Fundarski	54,606	98.52%
Republican	Write-ins	823	1.48%
Total votes		55,429	100.00%

== General election ==
=== Results ===
2010 Wayne County Executive election
Party	Candidate	Votes	%
Democratic	Robert A. Ficano (inc.)	381,791	74.91%
Republican	Mario Nesr Fundarski	125,849	24.69%
Write-in		2,026	0.40%
Total votes		509,666	100.00%
Democratic hold			
