= Dennis Archer =

American jurist and politician (born 1942)

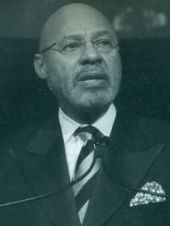

67th Mayor of Detroit
- In office January 3, 1994 – January 1, 2002
- Preceded by: Coleman Young
- Succeeded by: Kwame Kilpatrick

75th President of the National League of Cities
- In office 2001
- Preceded by: Robert G. Knight
- Succeeded by: Karen J. Anderson

Associate Justice of the Michigan Supreme Court
- In office January 1, 1986 – December 27, 1990
- Appointed by: James Blanchard
- Preceded by: James L. Ryan
- Succeeded by: Conrad L. Mallett Jr.

Personal details
- Born: Dennis Wayne Archer; January 1, 1942 (age 84) Detroit, Michigan, U.S.
- Party: Democratic
- Spouse: Trudy DunCombe (m. 1967)
- Children: 2
- Education: Western Michigan University (BS); Detroit College of Law (JD)

Dennis Wayne Archer (born January 1, 1942) is an American lawyer, jurist and politician from Michigan. A Democrat, Archer served as Justice on the Michigan Supreme Court and as mayor of Detroit. He later served as president of the American Bar Association, becoming the first black president of the organization, which, until 1943, had barred African-American lawyers from membership.

== Early life and education ==
Dennis Archer was born on January 1, 1942, to a working-class family living on the east side of Detroit. His family struggled financially because Archer's father lost his arm in an automobile accident. There were few employment opportunities for disabled people in the city, so the family relocated to rural Cassopolis when Archer was five years old.

Archer began working to help provide for his family at just eight years old. He worked as a golf-caddy, pinsetter at a bowling alley, and janitor at a bakery. After graduating high school, Archer financed his college education by painting homes, working at a drug store and becoming the first African-American to work in the Henry Ford Hospital medical records department. Archer began his college education at Wayne State University with the intention of becoming a pharmacist. He later transferred to the Detroit Institute of Technology and then to Western Michigan University.

At Western Michigan University, he earned his Bachelor of Science degree in education. He initially had planned to be a history teacher but later transferred to being a special education teacher at Ralph Bunche Elementary School, located just east of downtown Detroit. From 1965 to 1970, Archer taught disabled children in Detroit Public Schools. He then went on to earn his J.D. from the Detroit College of Law, now the College of Law of Michigan State University, in 1970.

In addition to practicing law in Detroit, Archer was an associate professor at the Detroit College of Law from 1972 to 1978, and an adjunct professor at Wayne State University Law School from 1984 to 1985. He was a member of the board of directors of the Detroit Bar Association and chairman of the association's Young Lawyers Section from 1973 to 1975. Archer was also president of three bar associations: The Wolverine Bar Association from 1979 to 1980, the National Bar Association from 1983 to 1984, and the State Bar of Michigan from 1984 to 1985.

== Service on the Michigan Supreme Court ==
After a very successful 15-year career as a lawyer, Archer was appointed to the Michigan Supreme Court by Governor James Blanchard. He was only the second black man to sit on that court in Michigan's history, ending a nearly twenty-year period without African American presence. Archer served as a justice from 1986 to 1990. During his last year on Michigan Supreme Court, he was named "most respected judge in Michigan" by Michigan Lawyers Weekly.

== Detroit mayoralty ==
Archer began his campaign for mayor in 1993, running against Mayor Coleman Young, seeking reelection to serve his sixth term in office. When Mayor Young dropped out of the race due to illness, he gave his endorsement to Sharon McPhail.

Archer ran on a platform of bridging the gap between the suburban and urban populations of Detroit. He also ran on a plank against casinos, a position that put him in line with most city voters and many of the religious leaders in the city. This created distrust among some in the African-American community who feared that Archer would prioritize the needs of whites over their own. Many thought that Archer “was not black enough to be mayor of a city that was about 80 percent African American”. Archer worked to end this perception by explaining who he represents. “I stand before you representing the children who are more concerned about surviving the school day... the homeless, the disenfranchised and the working poor who want affordable housing, and a clean and decent place to live”. He emphasized that he was interested in improving life for all city and suburban dwellers, whether they be black, white, Arabic, Jewish, or Hispanic. One of the chief campaign strategists for Archer was David Axelrod.

In November 1993, Archer won the election over McPhail, with votes divided 57 to 43 percent respectively. According to exit polls Archer won 90 percent of the white vote but only 47 percent of the black vote.

Archer served as mayor of Detroit from 1993 to 2001. During his tenure, he worked to repair the city's relations with the Detroit suburbs and the local business community through cooperation with suburban business leaders on their redevelopment plans for the city. One of his major economic contributions to Detroit was attracting the tech giant Compuware to the city. During his tenure the city saw its bond rating upgraded multiple times. When he became mayor the city was still tracking most complex financial processes on file cards. Archer introduced computerization to most city departments. His administration also initiated a work force development program.

In his first term as mayor, Detroit was selected to house an empowerment zone and received other federal benefits which cumulatively brought $100 million to the city. Unemployment also decreased in the city.

Archer was a strong supporter of numerous construction projects in downtown Detroit, including two new stadiums, Ford Field for the Detroit Lions and Comerica Park for the Detroit Tigers. Archer also became president of the National League of Cities during his last year as mayor.

Despite the decrease in crime and unemployment during Archer's time as mayor, he was frequently criticized for allegedly not supporting or listening to leaders of the African-American community. He faced strong opposition when opening three casinos within city limits and not granting any of the three casino licenses to an African American.

Archer was re-elected by a large margin in 1997 but was subject to a recall campaign in his second term, launched by many of his original opponents. He declined to run for reelection in 2001.

== Post-mayoralty ==
Upon leaving office as mayor in January 2002, Archer was appointed as chairman of Detroit-based law firm Dickinson Wright, and the board of directors of Compuware. He is a Fellow of the Litigation Counsel of America.

In 2004, he was appointed to an eight-year term ending December 31, 2012 on the board of trustees of the Western Michigan University by Michigan Governor Jennifer Granholm. He was appointed legal guardian for Rosa Parks in October 2004.

In February 2008, Archer announced that he was considering running for governor of Michigan in 2010, but ultimately decided not to enter the race the following November.

Archer serves as a co-chair of the National Transportation Policy Project at the Bipartisan Policy Center.

He is currently a member of investment bank Jefferies Global Senior Advisory Board.

Archer is an at-large member of the Democratic National Committee, where he serves as a member of the executive committee.

Archer was a superdelegate to the 2016 Democratic National Convention. He supported the candidacy of Hillary Clinton.

On December 1, 2017, Archer released his memoir, "Let the Future Begin," co-written with Elizabeth Ann Atkins, and published by Atkins & Greenspan Writing.

== Personal life ==
Archer is a member of Alpha Phi Alpha and of Geometry Lodge #49, F&AM PHA, Prince Hall Freemasonry.

He is Catholic, and attended Gesu Catholic Church during his terms as mayor.

== Notes ==
Political offices
Preceded by Coleman Young	Mayor of Detroit; 1993–2001	Succeeded by Kwame Kilpatrick
