= Warren Evans =

American politician (born 1948)

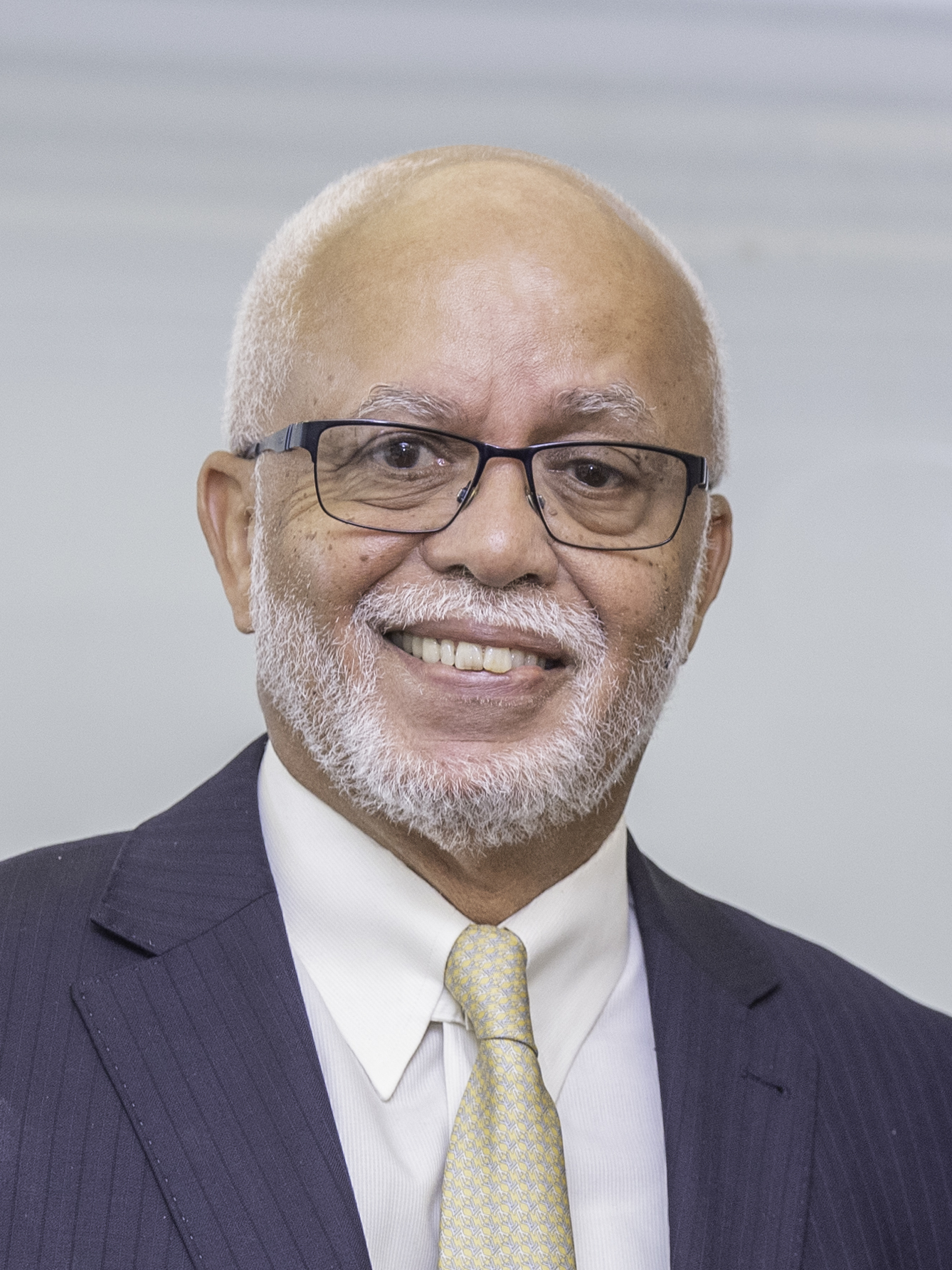
- Evans in 2019

Executive of Wayne County
- Incumbent
- Assumed office January 1, 2015
- Preceded by: Robert A. Ficano

39th Chief of the Detroit Police Department
- In office July 6, 2009 – July 22, 2010
- Appointed by: Dave Bing
- Preceded by: James Barren
- Succeeded by: Ralph Godbee

Sheriff of Wayne County
- In office January 1, 2003 – July 6, 2009
- Preceded by: Robert A. Ficano
- Succeeded by: Benny Napoleon

Personal details
- Born: December 30, 1948 (age 77) Detroit, Michigan, U.S.
- Party: Democratic
- Education: Madonna University (BA); University of Detroit (MA); Michigan State University (JD)

Warren Cleage Evans (born December 30, 1948) is an American law enforcement official, lawyer, and politician serving as the county executive of Wayne County, Michigan since 2015. A member of the Democratic Party, Evans served as the sheriff of Wayne County from 2003 until 2009, and as the chief of the Detroit Police Department from 2009 until 2010. He was an unsuccessful candidate in the 2009 Detroit mayoral special election.

== Early career ==
Evans began his career in law enforcement as a deputy with the Wayne County Sheriff's Department in 1970. Evans rose through the ranks of the department, serving as Undersheriff and the department's second-in-command officer from 1987 through to 1991. Evans became the director of administration for the Wayne County Board of Commissioners in 1991 and created the Wayne County Department of Community Justice and served as its director from 1992 to 1997. He rejoined county government in 2001 as chief of Special Operations for the Wayne County Prosecutor's Office in 2001 and was named sheriff in 2003 and was elected to full terms in 2004 and 2008.

== Chief of Police ==
On July 6, 2009, Evans was named as the 39th Chief of Police of the Detroit Police Department by Mayor Dave Bing, replacing James Barren, who Bing had fired the previous Friday.

Evans was asked to resign by Bing just over a year into his tenure in July 2010. Bing did not give specifics about why he asked Evans to resign but said "a combination of things" were met with disapproval, and the department was "compromised in some of the decisions he made." Speculation over Evans' desire to be a reality TV star and a relationship he had with a subordinate in the department contributed to his removal.

== Politics ==
Evans ran for mayor of Detroit in the February 2009 special election that was caused by the resignation of Kwame Kilpatrick in September 2008. Evans came in fourth in the primary, taking just over 10 percent of the vote, Bing and then-interim Mayor Ken Cockrel, Jr. advanced to the general special election in May.

Evans announced in April 2014 that he was going to seek the Democratic nomination for Wayne County Executive, challenging 3-term incumbent Robert Ficano. Evans easily won the Democratic primary in August 2014, taking 46 percent of the vote. Evans defeated Republican nominee John Dalton.

After running unopposed in the Democratic Primary, Evans defeated Republican challenger Denis Curran to win a second-term as County Executive in November 2018.

Warren C. Evans most notable accomplishment during his career was his ability to turn a 52 million deficit into a surplus.

During his second term (2022), Detroit Metropolitan Airport Authority voted unanimously to name a terminal (Warren Cleage Evans Terminal) after him.

== Electoral history ==
Wayne County Sheriff election, 2008
Party	Candidate	Votes	%	±%
Democratic	Warren Evans (I)	668,863	80.6	N/A
Republican	Taras P. Nykoriak	133,958	16.1	N/A
Constitution	Bob Czak	25,150	3.0	N/A
Write-In	Write-ins	1,828	0.2	N/A
Democratic hold				

Wayne County Executive Democratic Primary, 2014
Party	Candidate	Votes	%	±%
Democratic	Warren Evans	68,795	43.9	N/A
Democratic	William Wild	40,928	26.1	N/A
Democratic	Phil Cavanagh	15,332	9.8	N/A
Democratic	Robert Ficano (I)	9,370	6.0	−92.2
Democratic	Bettie Cook Scott	4,722	3.0	N/A
Democratic	Christopher Wojtowicz	2,643	1.7	N/A
Democratic	Cindy Darrah	2,387	1.5	N/A
Democratic	Sigmunt Szczepkowski	840	0.5	N/A
Democratic	Adam Adamski	670	0.4	N/A
Democratic	Russell George Leviska	303	0.2	N/A
Democratic	Write-ins	238	0.2	N/A

Wayne County Executive election, 2014
Party	Candidate	Votes	%	±%
Democratic	Warren Evans	341,281	69.7	−5.2
Republican	John Dalton	133,098	27.2	+2.5
Libertarian	Keith Butkovich	14,482	3.0	N/A
Write-In	Write-ins	748	0.2	N/A
Majority		208,183	42.5	−7.7%
Turnout		489,609		−3.4%
Democratic hold				

Wayne County Executive election, 2018
Party	Candidate	Votes	%	±%
Democratic	Warren Evans (Incumbent)	458,238	73.0	+3.3
Republican	Denis Curran	163,664	26.1	−1.1
Write-In	Write-ins	3,119	0.5	+0.3
Majority		294,574	46.9	+4.4%
Turnout		628,140		+28.3%
Democratic hold				
