= Edward Vaughn =

American politician (1934–2024)

Ed Vaughn

Member of the Michigan House of Representatives from the 4th district
- In office January 11, 1995 – December 31, 2000
- Preceded by: Joseph F. Young Jr.
- Succeeded by: Mary D. Waters

Member of the Michigan House of Representatives from the 8th district
- In office January 10, 1979 – December 31, 1980
- Preceded by: Daisy Elliott
- Succeeded by: Daisy Elliott

Personal details
- Born: Edward Vaughn; July 30, 1934 Abbeville, Alabama, U.S.
- Died: October 8, 2024 (aged 90)
- Party: Democratic
- Children: 6
- Education: Fisk University (BA)

Military service
- Branch/service: United States Army

Edward Vaughn (July 30, 1934 – October 8, 2024) was an American politician, businessman, and activist who served as a member of the Michigan House of Representatives from 1979 to 1980 and again from 1995 to 2000.

== Early life and education ==
Vaughn was born in Abbeville, Alabama. He earned a Bachelor of Arts degree in history and government from Fisk University and attended the University of Illinois College of Law for one year.

== Early career ==
Vaughn moved to Detroit in 1956. He served in the United States Army and worked for the United States Postal Service. Vaughn also worked at local restaurants and sold books out of his car. Vaughn later opened a Black Power bookstore, supported by minister and writer Albert Cleage. The store became a bastion of the Black Power movement, and was significantly damaged during the Long, hot summer of 1967. Vaughn has been called an "understated Black Power icon" by Literary Hub.

Ed Vaughn, with Arthur Smith (Kwame Atta), co-founded the Pan-African Congress-USA in Detroit, an organization that was formed to establish ties with African countries and supported the liberation struggle against white minority rule on the continent. The organization also had a scholarship program and sponsored some students from Africa to go to college in Detroit.

One of them was Godfrey Mwakikagile from Tanzania who became a renowned African studies scholar and author of many non-fiction books on African history, economics and politics and on the African diaspora. He also briefly attended Malcolm X Liberation University in Greensboro, North Carolina. His books are found in university and public libraries around the world. They are primarily for scholars.

Ed Vaughn was also one of the main African American delegates to the Sixth Pan-African Congress in Dar es salaam, Tanzania, in June 1974, together with C.L.R. James, Amiri Baraka (LeRoi Jones) Charlie Cobb, Howard Fuller (Owusu Sadaukai) who was the founder and president of Malcolm X Liberation University, and Courtland Cox who, together with C.L.R. James, served as Secretary-General of the Sixth Pan-African Congress.

The conference was held in Nkrumah Hall on the campus of the University of Dar es Salaam and was the first of its kind to be held on African soil. President Julius Nyerere was the keynote speaker. The last one, the Fifth Pan-African Congress, was held in Manchester, England, in October 1945 and was attended by future African leaders including Kwame Nkrumah, Jomo Kenyatta and Hastings Kamuzu Banda who became the first presidents of their countries on attainment of independence.

Ed Vaughn was also one of the leading African American delegates to the Sixth Pan-African Congress who met with President Nyerere and had private conversations with him. C.L.R. James also had meetings with Nyerere.

Amiri Baraka also had private conversations with President Nyerere at Nyerere's residence and discussed, among other things, the fate of Tanzania's senior cabinet member Abdulrahman Mohamed Babu, Minister of Economic Planning, who was in detention accused of masterminding the assassination of Tanzania's First Vice President and president of Zanzibar, Abeid Karume, as Baraka stated in his book The Autobiography of LeRoi Jones.

He said Nyerere told him he refused to send Babu to Zanzibar to stand trial because he was afraid they were going to kill him, as they did in 1969 another union cabinet member Abdullah Kassim Hanga who was also a close friend of Guinea's President Ahmed Sékou Touré. Sékou Touré was also a very close friend of Nyerere.

Babu was a very close friend of Amiri Baraka and Malcolm X. Ed Vaughn also knew Malcolm X. They first met in Detroit in 1963. It was also in the same year, on October 22, that Malcolm X gave a speech as the main speaker at a conference at Wayne State University in Detroit, almost exactly one year and four months before he was assassinated in New York City on February 21, 1965.

Ed Vaughn also met and talked to Ugandan military head of state Idi Amin when he was in Africa in 1974, as Godfrey Mwakikagile has explained in his book Reflections on Race Relations: A Personal Odyssey.

Vaughn also taught history in Detroit from a black nationalist perspective and lectured for many years on a wide range of issues affecting the wellbeing of black people in the United States and Africa.

== Political career ==
On November 7, 1978, Vaughn was first elected to the Michigan House of Representatives, where he represented the 8th district from January 10, 1979, to December 31, 1980. On November 8, 1994, Vaughn was again elected to in the state house where he represented the 4th district from January 11, 1995, until he was term limited on December 31, 2000.

Vaughn unsuccessfully ran for mayor of Detroit in 1997. He also served as executive assistant to Detroit's first black mayor Coleman Young and was an unsuccessful candidate for the Michigan Senate seat representing the 2nd district in 2001.

In 2000, Vaughn participated in a forum hosted by the Congressional Black Caucus, in which he advocated for slavery reparations.

In 2018, Vaughn's writings were collected and donated to the library of Wayne State University.

== Personal life and death ==
Vaughn had six children. He died on October 8, 2024, at the age of 90.
