= 2005 Detroit mayoral election =

- November 8, 2005
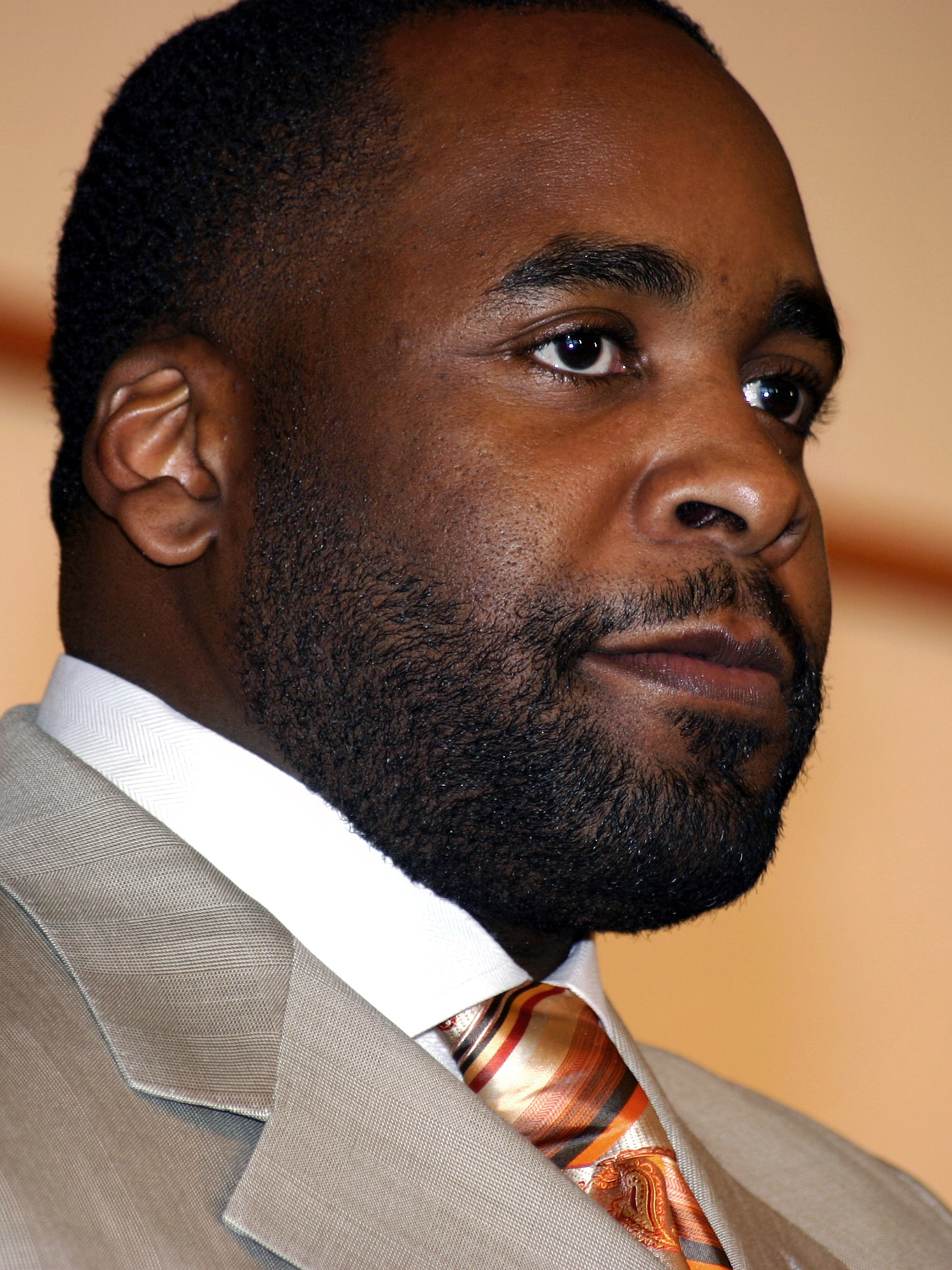

| Candidate | Kwame Kilpatrick | Freman Hendrix |
| Popular vote | 123,140 | 108,600 |
| Percentage | 52.77% | 46.54% |
Mayor before election
Kwame Kilpatrick
Nonpartisan
Elected mayor
Kwame Kilpatrick
Nonpartisan

The 2005 Detroit mayoral election took place on November 8, 2005, following a primary election on August 2, 2005. Incumbent Mayor Kwame Kilpatrick, who was first elected in 2001, ran for re-election to a second term. He was challenged by a large field of candidates, including former Deputy Mayor Freman Hendrix, City Councilwoman Sharon McPhail, and State Senator Hansen Clarke. As Kilpatrick ran for a second term, he faced opposition over the city's budget deficits and poor economy, as well as allegations that he used city resources to enrich himself and his family. Kilpatrick placed second in the primary election, winning 34 percent of the vote to Hendrix's 44 percent. In the general election, Kilpatrick narrowly defeated Hendrix, 53–47 percent, to win a second term. However, in 2008, Kilpatrick was indicted for obstruction of justice, and resigned later that year, triggering a special election in 2009.

== Primary election ==
=== Candidates ===
- Freman Hendrix, former Deputy Mayor, former Chairman of the Detroit Board of Education
- Kwame Kilpatrick, Incumbent mayor
- Sharon McPhail, City Councilwoman, 1993 candidate for Mayor
- Hansen Clarke, State Senator
- Sarella Johnson
- Clayton V. Johnson
- Angelo Scott Brown
- Veronica Brown
- Tania K. Walton
- Stanley Michael Christmas
- Roy Godwin
- Clifford Brookins II

=== Results ===
2005 Detroit mayoral primary election
| Party | Candidate | Votes | % |
|---|---|---|---|
| Nonpartisan | Freman Hendrix | 60,117 | 44.27% |
| Nonpartisan | Kwame Kilpatrick (inc.) | 45,783 | 33.72% |
| Nonpartisan | Sharon McPhail | 15,963 | 11.76% |
| Nonpartisan | Hansen Clarke | 12,152 | 8.95% |
| Nonpartisan | Sarella Johnson | 306 | 0.23% |
| Nonpartisan | Clayton V. Johnson | 296 | 0.22% |
| Nonpartisan | Angelo Scott Brown | 272 | 0.22% |
| Nonpartisan | Veronica Brown | 217 | 0.16% |
| Nonpartisan | Tania K. Walton | 181 | 0.13% |
| Nonpartisan | Stanley Michael Christmas | 151 | 0.11% |
| Nonpartisan | Roy Godwin | 139 | 0.10% |
| Nonpartisan | Clifford Brookins II | 133 | 0.10% |
| Write-in | | 76 | 0.06% |
| Total votes | | 135,786 | 100.00% |

== General election ==
=== Campaign ===
In the general election, Hendrix attacked Kilpatrick over his alleged mismanagement of the city and his own personal scandals, and polling consistently showed him ahead. However, toward the end of October, polls showed the race tightening. Following the death of civil rights activist Rosa Parks on October 24, 2005, Kilpatrick gave a eulogy at her funeral, which attracted significant media attention and plentiful free media exposure in the final days of the race.

=== Polling ===
| Poll source | Date(s) administered | Sample size | Margin of error | Freeman Hendrix (D) | Kwame Kilpatrick (D) | Undecided |
|---|---|---|---|---|---|---|
| SurveyUSA | November 4–6, 2005 | 528 (LV) | ± 4.4% | 51% | 44% | 4% |
| SurveyUSA | October 25–27, 2005 | 511 (LV) | ± 4.4% | 49% | 46% | 6% |
| SurveyUSA | October 18–19, 2005 | 407 (LV) | ± 5.0% | 50% | 46% | 4% |
| SurveyUSA | October 15–17, 2005 | 461 (LV) | ± 4.6% | 56% | 39% | 6% |
| SurveyUSA | October 1–3, 2005 | 488 (LV) | ± 4.5% | 53% | 42% | 6% |

Key

- A – all adults
- RV – registered voters
- LV – likely voters
- V – unclear

=== Results ===
2005 Detroit mayoral general election results
| Party | Candidate | Votes | % |
|---|---|---|---|
| Nonpartisan | Kwame Kilpatrick (inc.) | 123,140 | 52.77% |
| Nonpartisan | Freman Hendrix | 108,600 | 46.54% |
| Write-in | | 1,630 | 0.70% |
| Total votes | | 233,370 | 100.00% |
