= Hansen Clarke =

American politician (born 1957)

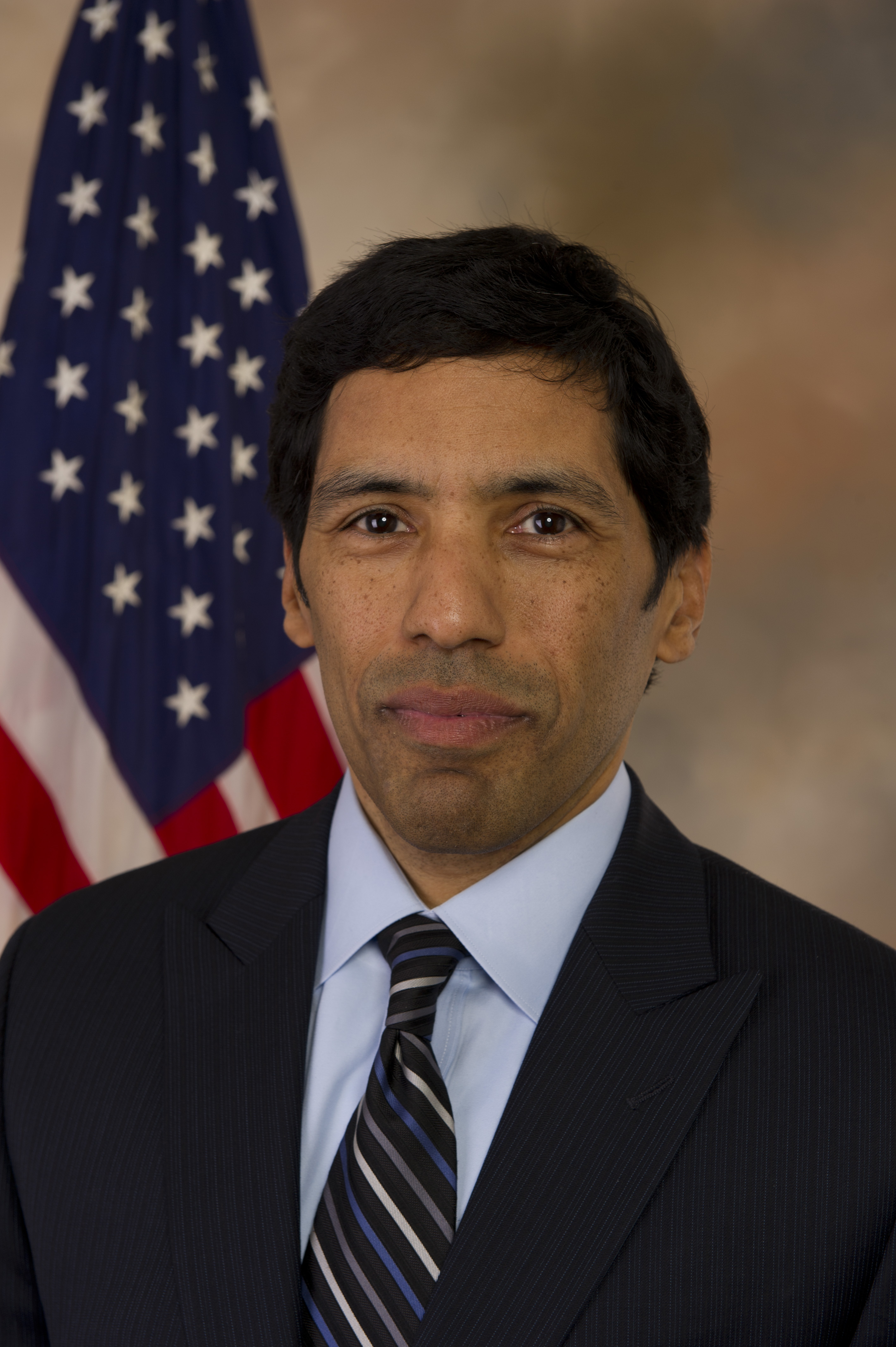

Member of the U.S. House of Representatives from Michigan's 13th district
- In office January 3, 2011 – January 3, 2013
- Preceded by: Carolyn Cheeks Kilpatrick
- Succeeded by: Gary Peters (redistricted)

Member of the Michigan Senate from the 1st district
- In office January 1, 2003 – January 1, 2011
- Preceded by: Joe Young
- Succeeded by: Coleman Young II

Member of the Michigan House of Representatives from the 7th district
- In office January 1, 1999 – January 1, 2003
- Preceded by: Ray Murphy
- Succeeded by: Virgil Smith Jr.

Member of the Michigan House of Representatives from the 16th district
- In office January 1, 1991 – December 31, 1992
- Preceded by: Juanita Watkins
- Succeeded by: Richard Young

Personal details
- Born: Molik Hashim; March 2, 1957 (age 69) Detroit, Michigan, U.S.
- Party: Democratic
- Education: Cornell University (BFA); Georgetown University (JD)

Hansen Hashim Clarke (born Molik Hashim, March 2, 1957) is an American politician. A Democrat, he was the U.S. representative for Michigan's 13th congressional district from 2011 to 2013. Prior to his election to Congress, he had been a member of the Michigan House of Representatives from 1991 through 1992 and from 1999 through 2002, and represented the 1st district in the Michigan Senate from 2003 to 2011. Clarke was also the first U.S. Congressman of Bangladeshi descent.

Clarke entered Congress after defeating incumbent Carolyn Cheeks Kilpatrick in the 2010 Democratic primary for the 13th congressional district. In 2012, due to redistricting, fellow incumbent Gary Peters chose to run against Clarke in the 14th congressional district primary. Clarke finished second in the primary behind Peters, and left Congress in January 2013.

In April 2014, Clarke announced he would again run in the 14th District after Peters announced he would be running for the U.S. Senate. Clarke lost the Democratic primary to Brenda Lawrence.

== Early life, education, and early political career ==
Molik Hashim was born in Detroit, Michigan. His father was a Bengali immigrant from Beanibazar in Sylhet, British India (now Bangladesh), and his mother was African-American. He grew up in the city's Lower East Side. Clarke's father died when he was eight years old and his mother worked as a crossing guard to support her family. Clarke is an alumnus of Cass Technical High School, and later graduated from The Governor's Academy, a Massachusetts boarding school. In 1978, he changed his name to Hansen Clarke, taking his mother's maiden name.

Clarke attended Cornell University, graduating with a degree in fine arts. He is a member of Alpha Phi Alpha fraternity. While at Cornell, Clarke became interested in public service and electoral politics. He was elected to the student seat on the Cornell University Board of Trustees, defeating fellow student and future political commentator Ann Coulter in the process. He earned a J.D. degree from Georgetown University Law Center in 1987.

Clarke worked on the County Executive's staff of Wayne County, during the administration of Edward H. McNamara, and then as chief of staff to U.S. Representative John Conyers.

== Michigan legislature ==
=== Elections ===
Clarke was elected to the Michigan House of Representatives in 1990, 1998, and 2000. After his six years in the Michigan House, Hansen Clarke was elected to the Michigan Senate in 2002. Senator Clarke was re-elected to his seat in the Senate in 2006. In 2010, Hansen Clarke was elected to represent the 13th District of Michigan in the United States House of Representatives.

=== Tenure ===
Clarke served on the State Senate Appropriations committee, and later served on the Health Policy committee and Commerce and Tourism committee.

== 2005 mayoral campaign ==
Clarke ran unsuccessfully in the 2005 Detroit mayoral election.

== U.S. House of Representatives ==
=== Elections ===
2010

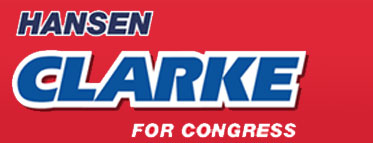
2010 campaign logo

Clarke defeated seven-term incumbent U.S. Rep. Carolyn Cheeks Kilpatrick in the Democratic primary for Michigan's 13th District—the real contest in this heavily Democratic, black-majority district—in Aug. 3, 2010.

In the general election, Clarke easily defeated Republican John Hauler, and became the third American of South Asian descent elected to Congress.

2012

After Michigan lost a congressional district in redistricting, most of Clarke's district became the 14th District. It was significantly redrawn to take in large slices of nearby Oakland County. Clarke's home was drawn into the 13th District, represented by fellow Democrat John Conyers, but Clarke opted to follow most of his constituents into the 14th. Clarke faced fellow Congressman Gary Peters and Southfield mayor Brenda Lawrence in the primary. Peters' 9th district had been eliminated in redistricting, and he chose to run in the 14th; he had represented much of the Oakland County portion of the district in both the state senate and in Congress. Peters emerged as the winner, and defeated Republican John Hauler in November.

2014

In May 2013, Peters announced that he would not be running for re-election in 2014. He instead ran for the U.S. Senate seat being vacated by retiring Democrat Carl Levin. Clarke attempted to win his seat back, but was defeated in the primary by Brenda Lawrence.

=== Tenure ===
Clarke championed initiatives to increase investment in the City of Detroit, which resulted in millions of dollars of federal assistance being awarded to the city and the region. He won approval in Congress to increase funding to improve nutrition for low-income families, provide housing for homeless veterans, and better equip and staff local police, fire, and emergency medical providers to bolster homeland security.

Student Loan Forgiveness Act of 2012 (H.R. 4170)

Clarke led the effort in Congress to cut student loan debt for millions of Americans by authoring the Student Loan Forgiveness Act of 2012. This bill inspired a national movement, including a petition in support of his legislation that received more than one million signatures that urged Congress to pass H.R. 4170.

Home foreclosures

Clarke also fought foreclosures to save family homes and neighborhoods. He established himself as one of the nation's strongest advocates for struggling homeowners and distressed communities with the Save Our Neighborhoods Act, a bill that would allow many homeowners to stay in their homes by suspending the foreclosure process and reducing their mortgage principal.

Literacy

Clarke worked to reduce crime and restore hope by addressing the urgent crisis of illiteracy among African-American and Hispanic men. He co-authored a bipartisan resolution initiating national action for literacy. Rep. Clarke also introduced the first federal legislation to "Ban the Box," which would prohibit unfair discrimination against job applicants with certain criminal backgrounds.

Clarke was a member of the Congressional Black Caucus, Congressional Asian Pacific American Caucus, and the Congressional Progressive Caucus.

=== Committee assignments ===
- Committee on Homeland Security
  - Subcommittee on Border and Maritime Security
  - Subcommittee on Emergency Preparedness, Response, and Communications
- Committee on Science, Space and Technology
  - Subcommittee on Space and Aeronautics
  - Subcommittee on Research and Science Education

== Electoral history ==
2002 Democratic Primary - Michigan's 1st State Senate District
Party	Candidate	Votes	%	±%
Democratic	Hansen Clarke	14,764	48.1	N/A
Democratic	Raymond Murphy	10,159	33.1	N/A
Democratic	Ellen Logan	5,332	17.4	N/A
Democratic	Lige Truitt	452	1.5	N/A

2002 General Election - Michigan's 1st State Senate District
Party	Candidate	Votes	%	±%
Democratic	Hansen Clarke	47,679	93.7	N/A
Republican	Cynthia Cassell	3,226	6.3	N/A

2005 Primary Election - Mayor of Detroit
Party	Candidate	Votes	%	±%
Non-partisan	Freman Hendrix	60,117	44.3	N/A
Non-partisan	Kwame Kilpatrick (I)	45,783	33.7	N/A
Non-partisan	Sharon McPhail	15,963	11.8	N/A
Non-partisan	Hansen Clarke	12,152	9.0	N/A
Non-partisan	Sarella Johnson	306	0.2	N/A
Non-partisan	Clayton Johnson	296	0.2	N/A
Non-partisan	Angelo Scott Brown	272	6.3	N/A
Non-partisan	Veronica Brown	217	0.2	N/A
Non-partisan	Tania Walton	181	0.1	N/A
Non-partisan	Stanley Michael Christmas	151	6.3	N/A
Non-partisan	Roy Godwin	139	0.1	N/A
Non-partisan	Clifford Brookins II	133	6.3	N/A
Non-partisan	Write In	76	6.3	N/A

2006 Democratic Primary - Michigan's 1st State Senate District
Party	Candidate	Votes	%	±%
Democratic	Hansen Clarke (I)	10,960	66.0	N/A
Democratic	LaMar Lemmons	3,807	22.9	N/A
Democratic	Martha Waters	1,839	11.1	N/A

2006 General Election - Michigan's 1st State Senate District
Party	Candidate	Votes	%	±%
Democratic	Hansen Clarke (I)	52,367	95.5	+1.9
Republican	Cynthia Cassell	2,458	4.5	−1.8

2010 Democratic Primary - Michigan's 13th congressional district
Party	Candidate	Votes	%	±%
Democratic	Hansen Clarke	22,573	47.3	N/A
Democratic	Carolyn Cheeks-Kilpatrick (I)	19,507	40.9	N/A
Democratic	Glenn Plummer	2,038	4.3	N/A
Democratic	John Broad	1,872	3.9	N/A
Democratic	Vincent Brown	893	1.9	N/A
Democratic	Stephen Hume	820	1.7	N/A

2010 General Election - Michigan's 13th congressional district
Party	Candidate	Votes	%	±%
Democratic	Hansen Clarke	100,885	79.4	N/A
Republican	John Hauler	23,462	18.5	N/A
Green	George Corsetti	1,032	0.8	N/A
Independent	Duane Montgomery	881	3.3	N/A
Libertarian	Heidi Peterson	815	0.6	N/A

2012 Primary Election - Michigan's 14th congressional district
Party	Candidate	Votes	%	±%
Democratic	Gary Peters	41,233	47.0	N/A
Democratic	Hansen Clarke	30,848	35.2	N/A
Democratic	Brenda Lawrence	11,650	13.3	N/A
Democratic	Mary Waters	2,920	3.3	N/A
Democratic	Bob Costello	1,027	1.2	N/A

2014 Primary Election - Michigan's 14th congressional district
Party	Candidate	Votes	%
Democratic	Brenda Lawrence	26,387	35.62
Democratic	Rudy Hobbs	23,996	32.39
Democratic	Hansen Clarke	22,866	30.87
Democratic	Burgess Foster	831	1.12
Total votes		74,080	100

== Personal life ==
Clarke is married to Choi Palms-Cohen. They married in 2007, after meeting at the offices of the Institute of Continuing Legal Education (ICLE) in Ann Arbor, Michigan where she worked. They live on Detroit's east side where Clarke was born and raised. Clarke was raised as a Muslim but later converted to Catholicism.

== See also ==
- List of African-American United States representatives
- List of Asian Americans and Pacific Islands Americans in the United States Congress

U.S. House of Representatives
Preceded by Carolyn Kilpatrick	Member of the U.S. House of Representatives from Michigan's 13th congressional district 2011–2013	Succeeded by John Conyers
U.S. order of precedence (ceremonial)
Preceded by Mark Schauer as Former U.S. Representative	Order of precedence of the United States as Former U.S. Representative	Succeeded by Kerry Bentivolio as Former U.S. Representative
