= Michigan Lawyers Weekly =

Newspaper

- Type: Weekly newspaper
- Owner: BridgeTower Media
- Editor: Kelly Caplan
- Founded: 1986
- Headquarters: 900 W. University Drive, Suite J Rochester, MI 48307
- Website: milawyersweekly.com

Michigan Lawyers Weekly, published in Farmington Hills, Michigan, is a statewide newspaper for the legal profession.

The paper publishes each Monday, 52 weeks a year.

== History ==
Michigan Lawyers Weekly, founded in 1986, was first published in Lansing, Michigan by Lawyers Weekly, Inc. In December 2001, the paper relocated to Novi, Michigan.

In 2004, Minneapolis-based Dolan Media, Inc. (now BridgeTower Media) acquired the paper. Operations were moved to Farmington Hills in 2005.

== Content ==
Michigan Lawyers Weekly reports on Michigan and federal court decisions, legal ethics and judicial conduct issues, and jury verdicts.

The paper's website compiles sources of legal news, and information.

== See also ==
- Vince Colella
