= John J. Beck =

American politician

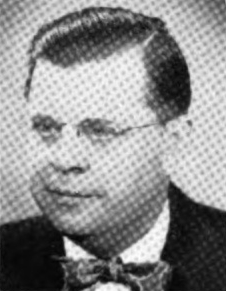

Member of the Michigan House of Representatives from the Wayne County 1st district
- In office January 1, 1953 – 1954

Personal details
- Born: January 8, 1900 Ford City, Pennsylvania
- Died: March 22, 1993 (aged 93) Detroit, Michigan
- Party: Democratic
- Education: University of Pittsburgh

John Joseph Beck (January 8, 1900 – March 22, 1993) was a Michigan politician.

== Early life ==
Beck was born in Ford City, Pennsylvania, on January 8, 1900. Beck attended the University of Pittsburgh.

== Career ==
Beck served as the deputy county clerk of Wayne County, Michigan, for 11 years. In 1940, Beck ran for in the Democratic primary for the position of member of the Michigan House of Representatives from Wayne County 1st district, but was defeated. On November 4, 1952, Beck was elected to the Michigan House of Representatives where he represented the CWayne County 1st district from January 14, 1953, to 1954. In 1954 and 1956, Beck ran for the position of member of the Michigan House of Representatives from Wayne County 4th district, but was defeated both times.

== Personal life ==
Beck was a member of St. Mary's Orthodox Church.

== Death ==
Beck died on March 22, 1993, in Detroit, Michigan.
