= Robert Ficano =

American sheriff

Robert A. Ficano
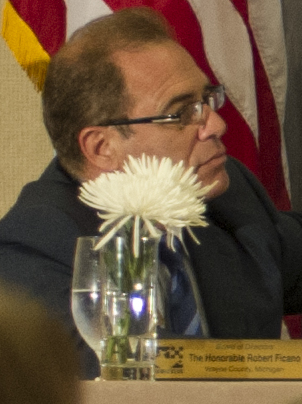
- Ficano in 2011

Wayne County Executive
- In office January 1, 2003 – January 1, 2015
- Preceded by: Edward H. McNamara
- Succeeded by: Warren Evans

Wayne County Sheriff
- In office 1983 – January 1, 2003
- Preceded by: William Lucas
- Succeeded by: Warren Evans

Personal details
- Born: July 19, 1952 (age 74) Detroit, Michigan
- Party: Democratic
- Spouse: Rosemarie B. Jarocha (m. 1979; div. 2004)
- Children: 2
- Education: Michigan State University; University of Detroit Mercy
- Profession: Politician

Robert Anthony Ficano (born July 19, 1952) is an American attorney and politician who served as the county executive of Wayne County, Michigan from 2003 until 2015. A member of the Democratic Party, Ficano previously served as the sheriff of Wayne County from 1983 until 2013.

== Early life ==
Ficano was born in Detroit, Michigan. He received his BA in 1974 from Michigan State University, and his JD in 1977 from University of Detroit. He worked as an attorney, and was assistant city attorney for the city of Westland, Michigan. He was nominated as the Democratic candidate for Michigan House of Representatives from the 36th District in 1980.

== County Executive ==
After years as an attorney in private practice in Westland, Michigan, Ficano was appointed to deputy County Clerk under then County Clerk James Kileen. When William Lucas left the office of Wayne County Sheriff in 1983 to run for Wayne County Executive, Ficano was appointed Wayne County Sheriff in 1983, and elected in 1984, 1988, 1992, 1996, and 2000. In the history of electoral politics in Wayne County, no one has ever been elected sheriff without being appointed to the job prior to an election. In 2002, Ficano was elected county executive, and took office in 2003.

As county executive, he generated controversy in 2004 with his veto of a proposed ordinance to ban smoking in most workplaces.

He is of Italian descent and lives in Livonia. Ficano has long held ties to the organized labor and the UAW in particular. His father was a custodian (and union member) in Livonia Public schools and his grandfather worked in the Ford Rouge factory.

Wayne County, which includes the city of Detroit and its western and southern suburbs, is one of the nation's largest population counties, with 1.8 million people.

=== FBI investigation ===
In October 2011, Ficano was served with subpoenas by the FBI for records related to "pay to play" allegations, where constituents felt forced to contribute to designated "charities", which employed friends of his, and also his office's authorization of a $200,000 severance payment to Turkia Awada Mullin, an employee who resigned. After local media reported it to the public, Mullin agreed to return the money.

During a special meeting on October 31, 2011, the Wayne County Airport Authority announced the termination of Turkia Mullin as CEO of Detroit Metropolitan Wayne County Airport. Shortly after Mullin's termination, Thomas Naughton was selected by the Airport Board as Interim CEO until a permanent replacement is announced. Naughton's history with the Wayne County Airport Authority extends back to 2002, where he's served as both Senior Vice President and Chief Financial Officer.

=== Charges against former employees ===
In May 2012, Laura Cox, a Republican on the County Commission, called for the immediate resignation of Ficano due to corruption charges against his former aide, David Edwards.

Edwards, who resigned in August 2012 from the department of technology, was charged on 8 May 2012 with one count of bribery. He allegedly misappropriated $13,000 from a county contractor.

=== 2014 defeat ===
On August 5, 2014, Ficano lost his bid for a fourth term as County Executive as he finished fourth in the Democratic primary, which was won by former Wayne County Sheriff and Detroit Chief of Police Warren Evans, taking just 6% of the vote.
