= 2009 Detroit mayoral election =

- November 3, 2009
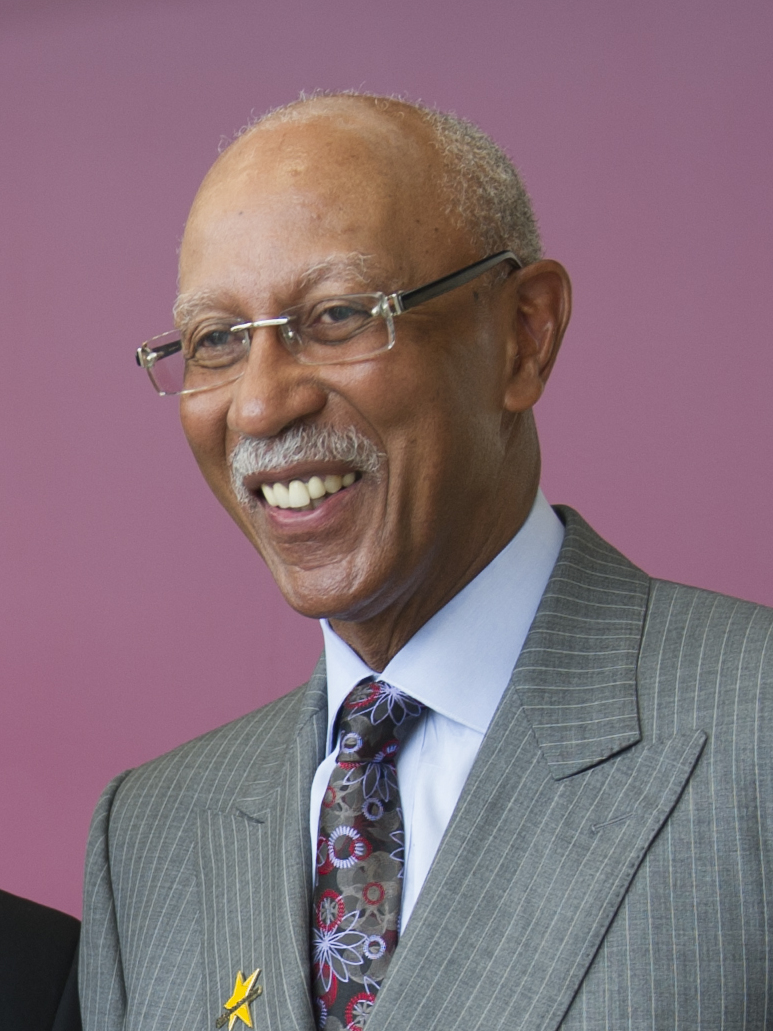

Candidate	Dave Bing	Tom Barrow
Party	Nonpartisan	Nonpartisan
Popular vote	70,166	50,785
Percentage	56.22%	40.69%
Mayor before election
Dave Bing
Nonpartisan
Elected mayor
Dave Bing
Nonpartisan

The 2009 Detroit mayoral election took place on November 3, 2009, following a primary on August 12, 2009. Incumbent Mayor Dave Bing, who was elected Mayor in a May special election, ran for a full term. Bing placed first in the primary by a wide margin, winning 74 percent of the vote. Accountant Tom Barrow, a 1989 candidate for Mayor, narrowly beat out business consultant Jerroll Sanders for second place, 11–10 percent, and advanced to the general election against Bing. Despite Bing's landslide victory in the primary, he defeated Barrow in the general election by a considerably reduced margin, winning 56 percent of the vote to Barrow's 41 percent. Barrow subsequently filed a legal challenge to the results, but the claims were ultimately dismissed.

== Primary election ==
=== Candidates ===
- Dave Bing, incumbent Mayor
- Tom Barrow, accountant, 1989 candidate for Mayor
- Jerroll Sanders, business consultant, 2009 candidate for Mayor
- Duane Montgomery, engineer, 2009 candidate for Mayor
- Dartagnan M. Collier, city water department employee
- Bob Allman, entertainment consultant

=== Results ===
2009 Detroit mayoral primary election
Party	Candidate	Votes	%
Nonpartisan	Dave Bing (inc.)	68,754	73.90%
Nonpartisan	Tom Barrow	10,321	11.09%
Nonpartisan	Jerroll Sanders	9,337	10.04%
Nonpartisan	Duane Montgomery	1,916	2.06%
Nonpartisan	Dartagnan M. Collier	1,268	1.36%
Nonpartisan	Bob Allman	874	0.94%
Write-in		566	0.61%
Total votes		93,036	100.00%

== General election ==
=== Results ===
2009 Detroit mayoral general election results
Party	Candidate	Votes	%
Nonpartisan	Dave Bing (inc.)	70,166	56.22%
Nonpartisan	Tom Barrow	50,785	40.69%
Write-in		3,851	3.09%
Total votes		124,802	100.00%

== Aftermath ==
Despite originally conceding the race to Bing, Barrow sought a recount of the election and then formally contested the results, arguing that "there are too many things wrong here" in the administration of the election. Barrow's legal challenge was dismissed by the trial court in 2010, and he subsequently appealed to the Michigan Court of Appeals. On November 9, 2010, the Court of Appeals unanimously dismissed the challenge, holding that Barrow's allegations were "conclusory" and his lawsuit lacked "specific, precise, definite or clear and positive factual allegations."
