= Kenneth Cockrel Jr. =

American politician (born 1965)

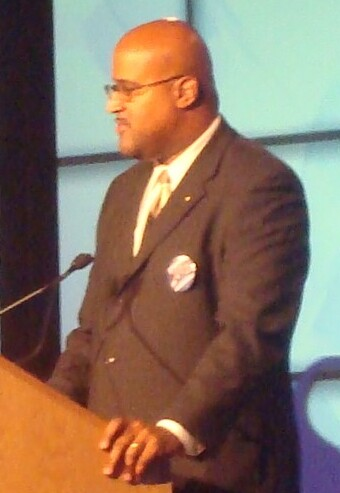
- Cockrel in 2009

73rd Mayor of Detroit
- In office September 19, 2008 – May 11, 2009
- Preceded by: Kwame Kilpatrick
- Succeeded by: Dave Bing

President of the Detroit City Council
- Preceded by: Maryann Mahaffey
- Succeeded by: Monica Conyers
- In office May 11, 2009 – December 31, 2009
- Preceded by: Monica Conyers
- Succeeded by: Charles Pugh

Member of the Detroit City Council
- In office 2009–2013
- In office 1998–2008

Personal details
- Born: Kenneth Vern Cockrel Jr. October 29, 1965 (age 60) Detroit, Michigan, U.S.
- Party: Democratic
- Spouse: Kimberly Cockrel
- Children: 5
- Education: Wayne State University
- Profession: Journalist, Politician

Kenneth Vern Cockrel Jr. (born October 29, 1965) is an American journalist, nonprofit executive, businessman, and former politician who served as the 73rd mayor of Detroit, from September 2008 to May 2009. A member of the Democratic Party, Cockrel served as a member of the Detroit City Council from 1997 to 2008, and again from 2009 to 2013, and as the council's president from 2005 to 2008 and May to December 2009.

On September 17, 2008, Cockrel was sworn in as the city's interim mayor following Kwame Kilpatrick's resignation, with his term in office beginning September 19.

On May 5, 2009, former Detroit Pistons player and businessman Dave Bing defeated Cockrel 52% to 48% in a special election for Mayor of Detroit, to complete the rest of the term. On May 11, 2009, Bing was sworn in as the new mayor of Detroit and Cockrel returned to his position as council president. He was replaced as president for the following term, and sat as a regular council member. On April 23, 2013, he announced that he would not run for re-election.

== Background ==
Kenneth Cockrel Jr. is the son of Kenneth Cockrel Sr. (November 5, 1938 – April 25, 1989), a former Detroit city council member and attorney. Ken Cockrel Sr. was a self-proclaimed Marxist-Leninist who died from a heart attack. Ken's mother was Carol Cockrel, a schoolteacher. He is a graduate of the St. Florian Church (Hamtramck, Michigan) High School. He graduated cum laude from Wayne State University and wrote for the Detroit Free Press.

He entered politics and was elected as a Wayne County commissioner. In 1997, Cockrel became the youngest person ever elected to the Detroit City Council. He became council president pro tempore in 2001, and was elevated to council president in 2005, receiving more votes than any other city council candidate in that year's election. He was viewed by the city's business community as a moderate consensus-builder. In his first term as a city councillor, he secured passage of an ordinance requiring the city to pay vendors and contractors for goods and services within 45 days.

== Mayoralty ==
As council president, Cockrel was first in the order of succession to assume the Mayor's Office if a vacancy occurred. Owing to the fallout from the text-messaging scandal, on September 4, 2008, Mayor Kwame Kilpatrick pleaded guilty to obstruction of justice and agreed to resign effective September 18, 2008, at midnight. Under the City Charter, Cockrel became interim mayor and a special election was ordered. Daniel Cherrin served as the communications director for the City of Detroit and press secretary to Mayor Cockrel from 2008 to 2009 and helped Mayor Cockrel and the city of Detroit through the transition.

As he became mayor, Cockrel stated that he planned to review the city budget, due to uncertainty around whether Kilpatrick was honest with the city council about the state of the city's finances, and perhaps to renegotiate a pending deal with the city of Windsor, Ontario, related to the cities' management of the Detroit-Windsor Tunnel. Under the existing deal, Windsor would have taken over full management of the tunnel in exchange for a $75 million loan to Detroit. Cockrel suggested that he would prefer to work out a new deal in which the two cities maintained joint management of the tunnel. Windsor mayor Eddie Francis stated that he was confident that he could maintain a strong working relationship with Cockrel.

Cockrel was defeated by Dave Bing, former Detroit Pistons star and Detroit businessman, in a special election on May 5, 2009, to finish the remainder of Kilpatrick's term, set to expire January 1, 2010, at midnight. Following certification of the vote and Bing taking office on May 11, 2009, Cockrel returned to his position as city council president.

== Post-political career ==
After leaving the Detroit City Council, Cockrel served as the executive director of a non-profit organization called Detroit Future City from January 2014 to June 2015. He also served as executive director of Habitat for Humanity Detroit from January 2016 to August 2018. Since August 2015, he has been the founder and principal owner of Ken Cockrel Jr. Consulting, LLC, a head consulting firm with a focus on business development and government relations.

== Personal life ==
He and his wife Kimberly have two sons, Kenneth III and Kyle Vincent, and three daughters, Kennedy Victoria, Kendal Imani and Kayla Lanette. Former councilwoman Sheila Cockrel is his stepmother.

Cockrel enjoys science fiction and action films. He concluded his inaugural address with quotes from Terminator 2: Judgment Day and Star Trek.

Political offices
Preceded by Kwame Kilpatrick	Mayor of Detroit; 2008-2009	Succeeded by Dave Bing
