= Sharon McPhail =

American politician

Member of the Detroit City Council
- In office 2002–2006
- Preceded by: Clyde Cleveland
- Succeeded by: Monica Conyers

Personal details
- Born: Cambridge, Massachusetts, U.S.
- Party: Democratic
- Education: Northeastern University (BA, JD)

Sharon McPhail is an American attorney and politician who served on the Detroit City Council from 2002 until 2006. McPhail was a candidate for mayor in the 1993 and 2005 elections. She was formerly a lawyer in private practice, a division chief in the Wayne County Prosecutor's Office, and an assistant United States attorney. She was a candidate for the Democratic nomination in Michigan's 13th congressional district in the 2022 United States House of Representatives elections.

== Early life and education ==
She was born and raised in Cambridge, Massachusetts. McPhail earned a Bachelor of Arts degree in English and sociology from Northeastern University and a Juris Doctor from the Northeastern University School of Law. She was admitted to the State Bar of Michigan in 1976.

== Career ==
She served as staff counsel for Ford Motor Company and later as a partner with the law firm Feikens, Stevens, Hurley & P.C., before going into private practice. She has served as president of the local Wolverine Bar Association and National Bar Association. She is a member of the Detroit Board of Police Commissioners and vice president of the Detroit Branch of the NAACP.

In 1993, McPhail finished second in a primary election for mayor of Detroit in field of 23 candidates. She lost the general election to Dennis Archer by 56 percent to 43 percent.

McPhail was general counsel for a coalition dedicated to recapturing the right to vote for the Detroit Public Schools Community District. She also served as general counsel for Mayor Kwame Kilpatrick.

McPhail was the superintendent of the Bay Mills Community College Charter School until she was fired in October 2018.

== 2022 U.S. House campaign ==
On March 15, 2022, McPhail announced her bid for the Democratic nomination for Michigan's 13th congressional district, newly redrawn to favor Democrats.

== Awards ==
McPhail was named one of Ebony Magazine's 100 Most Influential Black Americans and has received the March of Dimes Humanitarian of the Year award, and the National Sojourner Truth Meritorious Service Award from the National Association of Negro Business and Professional Women's Clubs, Inc.
