= Recorder's Court (Detroit) =

Former state court in Michigan, USA

The Recorder's Court, in Detroit, Michigan, was a state court of limited jurisdiction which had, for most of its history, exclusive jurisdiction over traffic and ordinance matters, and over all felony cases committed in the City of Detroit. Its jurisdiction did not extend to civil suits.

It was merged into the Wayne County Circuit Court, the general jurisdiction court in Wayne County, following the pattern of the rest of the state of Michigan in October 1997.

== History ==
=== Origin ===
It traces its roots to the Mayor's Court in Detroit, formed in 1824. To clarify, Detroit Recorders' Court was one of the oldest courts of record in the U.S.A.

This municipal court probably owed its name to the fact that from 1827 until 1857, the official name of the City of Detroit was "The Mayor, Recorder and Alderman of Detroit." A "Recorder" is the title of a judicial officer in England and Wales and some other common law jurisdictions, such as the former office "Recorder of New York City".

=== Sweet family murder trials ===
Within its 173-year history, the Ossian Sweet family murder trials—defended by Clarence Darrow and presided over by Judge Frank Murphy (who became Mayor of Detroit, Governor of Michigan, the last Governor-General of the Philippines and the first High Commissioner of the Philippines, United States Attorney General, and United States Supreme Court Associate Justice) is one of the most notable cases tried there.

The trials are memorialized in two official Michigan Historical Markers:

- Frank Murphy
- Dr. Ossian Sweet / Home

Additionally, there is a "Michigan Legal Milestones". plaque (erected by the State Bar of Michigan in the first floor of the Frank Murphy Hall of Justice in Detroit.

Kevin Boyle's chronicle, Arc of Justice: A Saga of Race, Civil Rights, and Murder in the Jazz Age was adapted into a play. Mr. Boyle was honored by the Detroit City Council for The Sweet Trials. *The Sweet Trials: Malice Aforethought is a play written by Arthur Beer, based on the trials of Ossian and Henry Sweet, and derived from Kevin Boyle's Arc of Justice.

=== Merger into Wayne County Circuit Court ===
The merger of the Recorder's court and Wayne County (Third Judicial) Circuit Court was not without controversy. It was made pursuant to a 1997 state law which also consolidated the state's probate courts into a family court, a far less controversial change. A lawsuit brought by Richard Kuhn opposed the merger, but did not prevail.

Prior to the merger, "judges of Recorder's Court were elected from Detroit, so unsurprisingly, most of them were African-American. Then Detroit Recorder's Court was abolished — or rather, it was merged with Wayne County Circuit Court. The Recorder's Court judges became Circuit Court judges, and have to run for re-election in Wayne County as a whole, which is predominantly white."

At the time of its merger, and now as reconfigured as a part of the Wayne County Circuit Court, the court has been housed in the Frank Murphy Hall of Justice.

== Notable judges ==
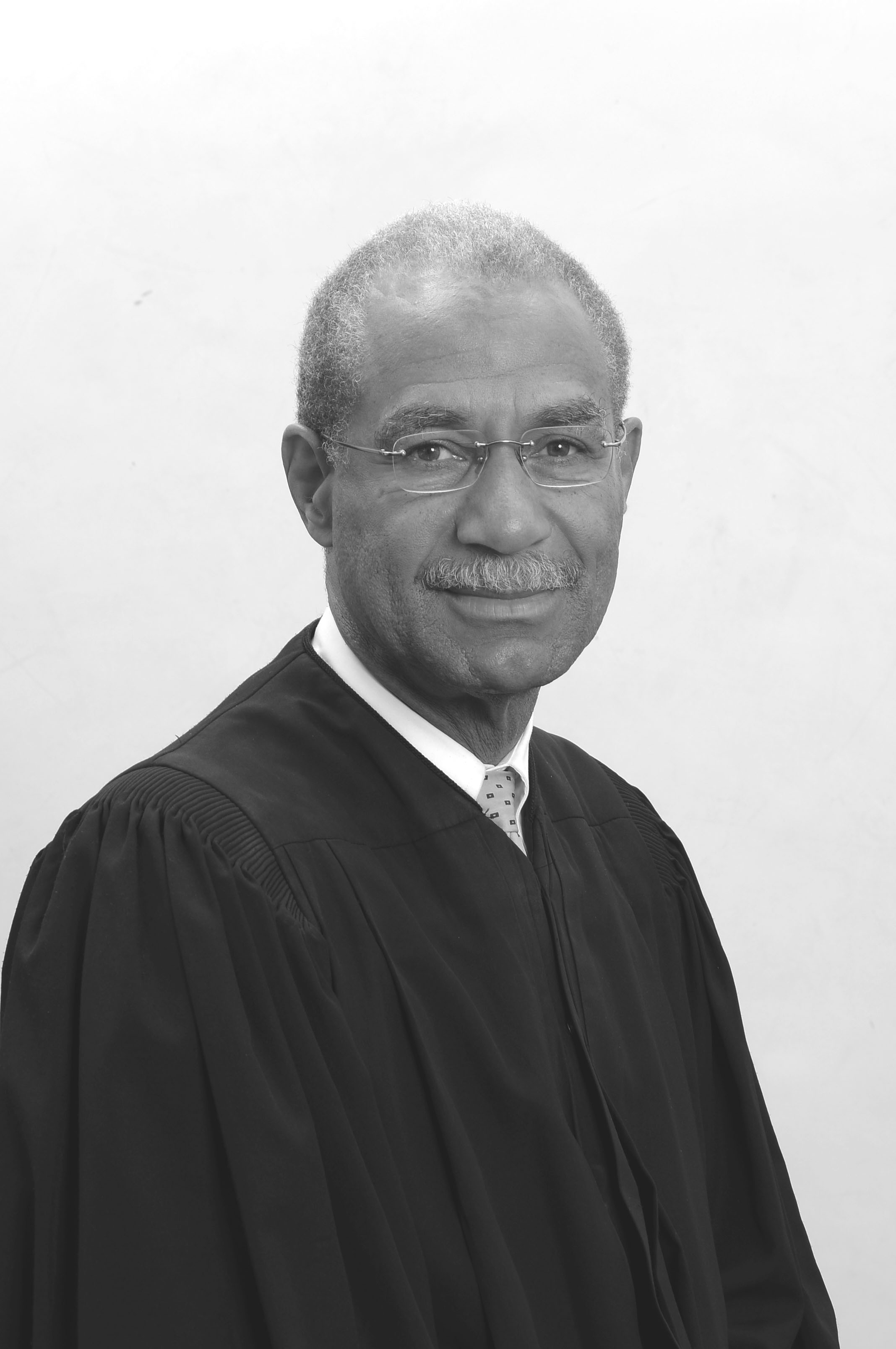
Judge Gershwin A. Drain

- George Crockett Jr., later a US Congressional Representative
- George Crockett III
- Gershwin A. Drain (born 1949), later a US federal judge
- Frank Murphy, later mayor of Detroit, governor of Michigan, attorney general of the United States, and Associate Justice of the United States Supreme Court
- John R. Murphy
- Henry A. Morrow, who became the commander of the 24th Michigan Infantry Regiment of the Iron Brigade during the American Civil War, eventually being promoted to Brigadier General and breveted Major General and returned to the army after the war and became the "father of the modern post exchange” for the army.
- Justin Ravitz, a lawyer for the League of Revolutionary Black Workers, was elected in 1972 with their support and the support of a large radical coalition.
