= Samson LeBeau Kpadenou =

American activist (born 1974)

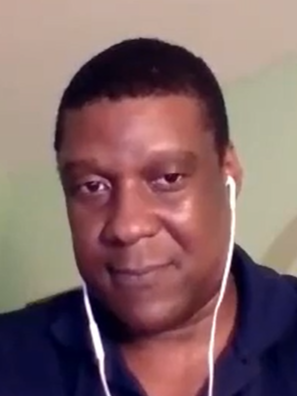

Personal details
- Born: Samson Komlan-LeBeau Kpadenou; April 30, 1974 (age 52)
- Party: Green
- Relations: George Crockett Jr. (grandfather) Ethelene Crockett (grandmother) George Crockett III (uncle) Kyra E. Hicks (cousin)

Samson Komlan-"LeBeau" Kpadenou (born April 30 1974) is an American political activist and waiter who served as an advisor for Jill Stein's 2024 presidential campaign and was her running mate in several states as a placeholder for Butch Ware. He was previously a candidate for Florida House of Representatives District 87 in 2018 where he won 15% of the vote against incumbent David Silvers, and was co-chair of the Green Party of Florida.

== Early life and career ==
Kpadenou was born in April 1974 to Dr. Samson Kossivi-Bernard Kpadenou and Ethelene Jones. His maternal grandparents are George Crockett Jr., and Ethelene Jones Crockett. He is the nephew of George Crockett III, and first cousin of Kyra E Hicks.

His father, Samson Kpadenou, was born in Lomé, Togo but moved to the United States for college. Kpadenou's father took on the primary role in raising him after his parents divorced in 1976. As an adult, Kpadenou worked in the service industry, getting a job at the City Cellar in CityPlace in West Palm Beach in 2007 and working there until the pandemic of 2020. He co-founded the Black Lives Matter branch in West Palm Beach, the Green Party of Palm Beach County, and the Palm Beach County Democratic Socialists of America. Before his political awakening in 2016, he was a supporter of President Barack Obama.

== Campaigns ==
=== State House campaigns ===
Kpadenou announced his candidacy for the Florida House of Representatives' 87th district as a Green Party candidate in October 2018 against incumbent David Silvers. He raised about $6,000 compared to Silver's $145,000. Most of Kpadenou's support came from individual voters while he ran a left-wing campaign. He lost the general election in November, finishing second with 4,622 votes (15.45%).

He filed to run for the same district in 2020, but was not on the ballot due to the difficulty of petitioning, campaigning and fundraising through the COVID pandemic.

=== Jill Stein 2024 presidential campaign ===
Jill Stein recruited Kpadenou as her campaign press liaison in October 2023, just prior to her official announcement. He was also used as a placeholder for her vice presidential nominee Butch Ware while petitioning, and was on the ballot in Tennessee, Alabama (as an independent), Idaho (as an independent), Kentucky (as the Kentucky Party), New Jersey, and Minnesota.
