= Killing of Malice Green =

American death in police custody

- Date: November 5, 1992
- Location: Detroit, Michigan, United States

Malice Green (April 29, 1957 – November 5, 1992) was an American resident of Detroit, Michigan who died after being assaulted by Detroit police officers Walter Budzyn and Larry Nevers on November 5, 1992. The official cause of death was ruled to be due to blunt force trauma to his head.

Budzyn and Nevers were patrolling in Detroit in plain clothes in an unmarked vehicle. Green had pulled up to a house known for drug activity. Budzyn asked Green for his driver's license, and Green then walked around to the passenger side of the car and sat in the passenger seat with his legs out of the doorway. Green looked through the glove compartment and grabbed something from the car's floor. Budzyn asked Green to let go of the object. Green allegedly failed to relinquish a vial of crack cocaine. After refusing to let go, Nevers struck Green in the head with his flashlight approximately 7 to 14 times during the struggle, which, according to the official autopsy, resulted in his death. After the struggle, Green was transported to a local hospital for treatment of the head injuries sustained in the struggle and died.

The seven officers present at the scene were suspended soon after Green's death, and the city of Detroit paid a civil settlement to Green's family. Budzyn and Nevers were convicted of second-degree murder in 1993, while charges against another officer were dropped and a fourth was found not guilty. However, both convictions were overturned. Following retrials, Budzyn was convicted of involuntary manslaughter in 1998 and Nevers was convicted of involuntary manslaughter in 2000.

== Initial reaction ==
The incident occurred only months after the Los Angeles riots of 1992, which protested the acquittal of police officers in the videotaped beating of Rodney King (Green was also a Black man). Unlike in Los Angeles, Detroit Police Department's Chief Stanley Knox suspended the seven officers present at the scene of the crime within 24 hours of Malice Green's death. Charges for four of the officers soon followed.

In December 1992, the city of Detroit paid a civil agreement of $5.25 million to Malice Green's family.

Sergeant Freddie Douglas, the only Black officer on the scene of Green's death, was charged with involuntary manslaughter for failing to intervene. Officer Robert Lessnau was charged with assault. Officers Larry Nevers and Walter Budzyn, partners, were charged with 2nd degree murder for Green's death. Known by many in the neighborhood as Starsky and Hutch, they were both highly decorated, with a documented history of excessive force complaints. Larry Nevers was a former member of the Stop the Robberies, Enjoy Safe Streets (STRESS) unit in Detroit, which was disbanded in 1974 after 20 Black men were shot by its police over a 3-year period. He was months away from retirement at the time of Green's death.

Prior to jury selection, Detroit Mayor Coleman A. Young stated that Green was "literally murdered by police" on national television.

== Legal proceeding ==
=== Charges ===
Officers Nevers, Budzyn, Robert Lessnau, and Freddie Douglas were charged in the death. Ultimately, charges against Douglas were dropped, and Lessnau was acquitted of assault.

=== Trial ===
Wayne County then-Assistant Prosecutors Kym Worthy and Douglas Baker tried the case against Budzyn and Nevers. Judge George Crockett III, in Detroit Recorder's Court, presided. The officers were tried together in Detroit after being denied a change of venue. Budzyn and Nevers were allowed separate juries. Both juries were composed of a majority of black citizens (two whites on Nevers' jury, one on Budzyn's), and both juries reached unanimous verdicts.

The testimony of the responding emergency medical technicians (EMTs) was very damaging to Budzyn and Nevers' case. All of them testified that Green was covered with blood and was hanging from the driver's side door when they arrived. The EMTs further said that Nevers struck Green in the head with his heavy police flashlight repeatedly, even though Green was not offering any significant resistance. Two of them stated that Nevers told Green to open his hands and hold still, and that, when he did not, Nevers hit him with the flashlight. They described Green as "dazed" and "stuporous" during the incident, saying that Green was uttering only a few words like "wait" while Nevers was striking him. Lee Hardy, one of the responding EMTs, testified during the separate assault trial for Robert Lessnau that he witnessed the former officer kicking Green in the head while he lay prone on the street.

During the trial, movies were provided for the jurors' entertainment while they were sequestered, including the film Malcolm X. The film depicts scenes of police brutality being perpetrated by white police officers, including the recent beating of Rodney King. It also contains a voiceover that claims white police officers are the direct descendants of the Ku Klux Klan. Both juries were shown the film on at least two occasions during the trial.

=== Verdict ===
On August 23, 1993, the jury found Budzyn and Nevers guilty of second degree murder. A third former officer who was tried with Budzyn and Nevers, Robert Lessnau, would be acquitted on a charge of assault with intent to do bodily harm. Two months later, Nevers was sentenced to serve 12 to 25 years in prison and Budzyn was sentenced 8 to 18 years.

=== Appeals ===
On July 31, 1997, the Michigan Supreme Court granted a new trial for Budzyn, mostly on the grounds of showing the movie Malcolm X (the movie's opening scenes show video of the Rodney King incident) to sequestered jury members while they waited to begin deliberating. It was learned that a political appointee of Mayor Young had made it onto the jury, and she was instrumental in showing the movie to jury members. Budzyn was immediately released from prison. He was retried, and on March 19, 1998, he was again found guilty of involuntary manslaughter. In January 1999, the Michigan Court of Appeals instated a four-year prison sentence. He had already served the minimum under the first conviction, and was released.

Nevers' 1997 appeal to the Michigan Supreme Court was denied. However, Nevers was successful on his appeal to a federal court, with United States District Judge Lawrence P. Zatkoff overturning the verdict and ordering his release on December 30, 1997. Zatkoff cited the showing of Malcolm X and its footage of the Rodney King beating video as creating a "harmful effect" on their verdict decision and thus counted as justification for not only overturning his conviction, but also granting him a writ of habeas corpus.

In 1999, the United States Court of Appeals for the Sixth Circuit affirmed Zatkoff's decision, with the United Supreme Court afterwards denying the prosecution's bid for a writ of certiorari. The appeals court argued that at least one juror in the case was influenced by the perception that a not guilty verdict would lead to riots, threatening the jury's impartiality. Nevers was convicted of involuntary manslaughter in May 2000 and sentenced to 7–15 years in prison. In March 2003, this conviction was overturned by the Michigan Court of Appeals, but, in September 2003, the Michigan Supreme Court reversed and upheld the conviction. On May 13, 2005, Nevers lost a bid to appeal the conviction in federal court. During this process, Nevers was treated for lung cancer and was released in 2001 to serve the rest of his sentence at home.

== Aftermath ==
In 2007, Larry Nevers wrote a self-published book titled Good Cops, Bad Verdict. He died in February 2013.

== Popular culture ==
- Outsider musician Wesley Willis' song "Larry Nevers/Walter Budzyn" is about the trial and aftermath of the beating.
- Insane Clown Posse referred to Nevers as someone who is going to receive retribution for his crimes in their song "Wagon Wagon" from Ringmaster
- Underground Resistance dedicated their release Message To The Majors to Malice Green.
- Although not written about the death of Green, Pearl Jam included a picture of Green in the booklet for their 1993 album, Vs, beside lyrics to the song "W.M.A." which alludes to racial profiling among US police.
- The single "Fight Music" by Detroit-based rap group D12 references the death of Green.
- Detroit rapper Bruiser Wolf references Green in a guest verse on the song "Y.B.P. (ft. Bruiser Wolf)" from Detroit-born rapper Danny Brown's 2023 album Quaranta. In his verse, Wolf raps: "Police violence, that's how Malice Green died."

== See also ==
- List of unarmed African Americans killed by law enforcement officers in the United States
- List of killings by law enforcement officers in the United States
- List of homicides in Michigan
