= Siwatu-Salama Ra =

American activist

Siwatu-Salama Ra is an American environmental and racial justice organizer. She is known for standing trial for assault and firearm felonies following an altercation where she displayed an unloaded and legally owned handgun in Michigan, a stand your ground state. Her case has been widely cited as an example of a racist justice system in the United States and highlighting the issues with mandatory minimum sentencing. She gave birth during her time in Women's Huron Valley Correctional Facility. In August 2019 she won her appeal and her conviction was reversed.

== Early life ==
At 19, Ra opposed Marathon Oil Refinery and the Detroit Renewable Power trash incinerator. She is co-director of East Michigan Environmental Action Council (EMEAC).

== Incident ==
Channell Harvey brought her daughter to Ra's mother's home and Ra asked her to leave. Parties in the case dispute the events which led to Ra's arrest and imprisonment after this event.

Ra claims Harvey then rammed Ra's parked car while Ra's 2-year-old daughter was playing in the vehicle. Ra's legal team claims Harvey was trying to hit Ra and her family with the car. Ra then pointed an unloaded legally-owned gun which she owned a conceal carry permit for. Michigan is an open carry state.

Harvey claims after a verbal argument, Ra went to her car where she removed her toddler and retrieved a pistol, she then cocked the pistol and pointed it at Harvey, at which point Harvey accidentally hit Ra's vehicle while attempting to drive away. Ra claimed the pistol was unloaded and used solely to deter any violence by Harvey.

== Trial ==
The jury focused on why the gun was in the car, an issue not presented to them during the case. The jury was also instructed that Ra had to be in fear of imminent death in order to justify pulling her weapon, an issue later becoming central to her appeal.

Ra was found guilty of assaulting Harvey. The jury did not believe that Ra's fear was enough to warrant her actions. She was convicted of a felony firearm conviction with a mandatory minimum sentence of two years. The jury of the trial were not informed that the gun charges carried a mandatory prison sentence.

The judge, Thomas Hathaway, refused to grant a request to postpone Ra’s sentence until after she gave birth due to her high risk pregnancy because of the mandatory minimum sentence law.

== Incarceration ==
Ra was incarcerated in Huron Valley Correctional Facility, a prison with overcrowding problems and structural issues. Ra was shackled to her bed during a vaginal exam. Ra gave birth to her son at St. Joseph Mercy Hospital, in Ann Arbor, MI, in the presence of four armed guards. She was not allowed to contact her family during the birth and was not allowed to breastfeed her son. After 48 hours, her son was taken from her and temporarily put into the care of her relatives.

== Appeal ==
In her post-conviction appeal, Ra was defended by Wade Fink Law, P.C. Attorney Wade Fink replaced prior counsel and subsequently secured Ra's release from prison. Ra's attorneys raised a number of issues on appeal, including that Ra was not permitted to defend herself using a self defense theory. Fink was ultimately successful in reversing the convictions.

== Convictions reversed ==
On August 20, 2019, the Michigan Court of Appeals reversed Ra's convictions, holding that Ra's use of a firearm did not constitute deadly force, but rather non deadly force, making trial jury instructions incorrect. Ra's attorney, Wade Fink of Wade Fink Law, P.C. in Birmingham, Michigan, stated that the "Michigan Court of Appeals again showed itself to be the thoughtful, deliberative judiciary that citizens can rely upon to do justice.” Whether the case will be retried by the Wayne County Prosecutor remains to be seen.

== Criticism of the case ==
The jury did not believe that Ra had an honest and reasonable belief that deadly force was necessary to defend herself or her family. This has been widely seen as racially motivated opinion and that the law sets a different standard of self defense for black people.

Patrisse Cullors, co-founder of Black Lives Matter:

Siwatu should be home getting ready to deliver her baby, and being with her family. Instead, she is suffering and isolated being punished for protecting herself, her child and [her] mother. This is a shameful, shameful reality, and it’s clear that we need to challenge a criminal justice system that would try a pregnant black woman for upholding “stand your ground” laws and her Second Amendment rights.

National Rifle Association of America:

No one should be imprisoned for exercising their right to self-defense.

After the case was reversed, conservative columnist David French of conservative media publication The National Review stated:

Prosecutors have a right to appeal the decision to their state supreme court. They should not. Ra has suffered immensely. She gave birth while imprisoned, and her child was taken from her two days later. She spent months separated from her newborn – after a conviction under the wrong legal standard. The court of appeals reached the just result. Ra’s legal ordeal needs to end.

== Plea deal and release ==
After Ra's convictions were reversed, she returned to the trial court where Wayne County Prosecutor Kym Worthy had to decide whether or not to retry the case. Prosecutor Worthy received over 900 letters from the community, and thousands of phone calls, asking her not to retry Ra. Her attorney, Wade Fink argued that because prosecutors had told the court that Ra was not a danger and did "not belong in prison" that there was no purpose to retrying the case. Nevertheless, prosecutors insisted on a retrial, forcing Ra to plead guilty to a minor misdemeanor in exchange for dismissal of the felonies, including the felony firearm, which carried a mandatory two year minimum. Ra was sentenced to time served and freed on January 31, 2020. Ra's attorney stated the following after the hearing:

Today is bittersweet. On the one hand Siwatu is free, her children have their mother, and the community has their fighter back. But on the other hand, an innocent person was forced to accept a misdemeanor conviction to avoid the risk of another wrongful imprisonment. That is becoming the norm in our country. 10% of those freed by the innocence project since 1989 were convicted because they pled guilty under some sort of plea bargain with prosecutors. Innocent people are convicted because plea bargaining in our criminal justice system is unfair and prosecutors leverage their negotiating position by threatening people with substantial prison, or multiple felonies, in order to deter trials and increase convictions. It is the heritage of our nation that our criminal justice system is to have heavy civilian participation. But when prosecutors wield their power in ways designed to facilitate convictions, then the power of the individual is eroded and so is our Constitutional system.
