= Murphy Hall =

Murphy Hall can refer to one of several buildings:

- Murphy Hall, the building housing the University of Minnesota School of Journalism and Mass Communication
- Frank Murphy Hall of Justice in Detroit
- Buildings named after Franklin David Murphy:
  - Murphy Hall, the administration building at UCLA
  - Murphy Hall, the building housing the music and theater departments at the University of Kansas
