= Decatur Public Schools =

Decatur Public Schools may refer to:

- Decatur Public Schools District 61, a school district in Macon County, Illinois
- Decatur Public Schools (Michigan), a school district in Van Buren County, Michigan
- Decatur City Schools, a school system in Morgan and Limestone counties, Alabama
- City Schools of Decatur, a school district in DeKalb County, Georgia
