= Charles H. Mahoney =

American attorney, politician and businessman (1886–1966)

- Born: May 29, 1886; Decatur, Michigan, U.S.
- Died: January 29, 1966 (aged 79); Detroit, Michigan, U.S.
- Education: Fisk University
- Occupations: Attorney, politician and businessman
- Known for: First African-American delegate to the United Nations
- Spouse: Sydney Fairbairn (m. 1916; div. 1925)

Charles Henry Mahoney (May 29, 1886 – January 29, 1966) was an American attorney, politician, and businessman, and the first African American appointed as a delegate to the United Nations. Mahoney was also the first African American to serve on the Detroit Planning Commission, the Wayne County Board of Supervisors and the Michigan Labor Council.

== Early life ==
Mahoney was born in Decatur, Michigan, on May 29, 1886, to Barney, and his wife, Viora Simpson. Mahoney attended grade school in Decatur. He attended Olivet College where he was renowned by professors as giving the best speech in the history of the college. He later received his Bachelor of Arts degree from Fisk University, before going on to attend law school at the University of Michigan where he graduated in 1911.

== Career ==
In 1918, Detroit Mayor James Couzens appointed Mahoney to the Detroit City Planning Commission, the first African American to serve in such a capacity. In 1925, he was hired by the National Association for the Advancement of Colored People to be the defense attorney for Dr. Ossian Sweet and 10 other defendants who had been accused of murder, eventually serving as an associate attorney to Clarence Darrow who was later hired for the case. The case ended with Sweet's acquittal. In 1928, Mahoney co-founded the Great Lakes Mutual Insurance Company, serving as the first President of the company until his departure in 1957. In 1939, he was appointed to the Michigan Department of Labor and Industry, by the Governor of Michigan, Frank Fitzgerald.

On July 26, 1954, Mahoney was nominated by President Dwight D. Eisenhower to serve as part of a delegation to the ninth session of United Nations General Assembly, under the leadership of ambassador Henry Cabot Lodge Jr. Mahoney was confirmed by the U.S. Senate as part of the nine member delegation on August 7, 1954.

In 1955, he helped organize the Public Bank of Detroit, becoming a member of its board of directors. Mahoney was a member of the Republican Party. He twice unsuccessfully campaigned for election to Congress.

== Death ==
Mahoney died at the Henry Ford Hospital, in Detroit, Michigan, on January 29, 1966. He was buried at the Evergreen Cemetery in Detroit.
