= Ossian Sweet =

American physician (1895–1960)

- Born: October 30, 1895; Orlando, Florida, U.S.
- Died: March 20, 1960 (aged 64); Detroit, Michigan, U.S.
- Education: Wilberforce University (B.Sc.); Howard University
- Scientific career
- Fields: Internal medicine
- Workplaces: Dunbar Hospital

Ossian Haven Sweet (/ˈɒʃən/ OSH-ən; October 30, 1895 – March 20, 1960) was an African-American physician in Detroit, Michigan. He is known for being acquitted of murder in 1925 after he and his friends used armed self-defense against a hostile white mob protesting after Sweet moved into their neighborhood.

Born in Florida to a farming family, Sweet went to Wilberforce University for preparatory work and his undergraduate degree. He earned his medical degree from Howard University, also a historically black university. After moving into a white neighborhood, the Sweets had stones thrown at their house, breaking windows. Shots were fired, and one white man was killed and another wounded. Sweet, his wife, and nine associates at the house (including two brothers) were all arrested and charged with murder.

At the first trial, the jury could not agree on verdicts for several defendants. The judge declared a mistrial. The court accepted the defense motion to sever the defendants, and the prosecutor decided to first try Henry Sweet, Ossian's youngest brother. After the all-white jury acquitted Henry Sweet, the prosecutor declined to prosecute the rest of the defendants and dismissed the charges against them. Collectively these were known as the Sweet Trials. The National Association for the Advancement of Colored People (NAACP) provided assistance for the defense of Sweet and his co-defendants, first hiring Charles H. Mahoney to represent the clients, then hiring the noted attorney Clarence Darrow which brought more national attention and media to the trial.

In the years after the trial in Detroit, his daughter Iva, wife Gladys, and brother Henry all died of tuberculosis, and he died by suicide in 1960 after a series of unsuccessful professional and business decisions that left him destitute.

== Biography ==
Ossian Haven Sweet was born in 1895 in Orlando, Florida as the second son of Henry Sweet and Dora DeVaughn. In 1898, his father, Henry, bought a farm in Bartow, the county seat of Polk County, Florida, and moved there with his entire family. They lived in a small farmhouse, and the children worked with the farm animals and in the fields. The Sweets had a total of ten children, including his brother Henry; they lived in cramped quarters on what little money they could earn through their farm.

At age five, Ossian Sweet witnessed the lynching of a black male teenager, Fred Rochelle, who was burned to death by a white mob. According to Sweet's later account, he was out alone at night about a mile from home, where he watched from the bushes as Rochelle was burned. Sweet later could "recount it with frightening specificity: the smell of the kerosene, Rochelle's screams as he was engulfed in flames, the crowd's picking off pieces of charred flesh to take home as souvenirs".

=== Education ===
In September 1909, at age 13, Sweet left Florida. His parents wanted their son to obtain an education in the North, beyond what had been provided in his segregated Florida schools. He was sent to Wilberforce University in Xenia, Ohio, the first college to be owned and operated by African Americans. It also had preparatory classes to ready students for college-level work.

Wilberforce University was established in 1855 by a collaboration of white and black Methodists. By the early 1860s, the Cincinnati Methodist Church had withdrawn support due to demands of the Civil War. The school struggled financially after most of its paying students, mixed-race children of white Southern planters, were withdrawn. The African Methodist Episcopal Church (AME) paid the debt and took over ownership and operation of the college.

Sweet attended Wilberforce for eight years. During the first four years, he studied in its prep school, learning Latin, history, mathematics, English, music, drawing, philosophy, social and introductory science, and foreign language (probably French) to prepare for college. Sweet took work in shoveling snow, stoking furnaces, washing dishes, waiting tables, and working as a hotel bellhop to pay the $118 for his tuition and books. At Wilberforce, he became a charter member of the Delta chapter of the fraternity Kappa Alpha Psi. He earned a Bachelor of Science degree at age 25. After Wilberforce, Sweet attended Howard University, a historically black college in Washington, D.C., where he earned his medical accreditation.

As a youth, Sweet had demonstrated dedication to his schoolwork, and he strove to succeed as a Southern black man in the Jim Crow era. Sweet became a leader in his family; he paved the way for his younger siblings to work hard and become educated as well. Through his education, he aspired to be among what W. E. B. Du Bois called the Talented Tenth: black professionals who would improve life for their people. Du Bois later wrote about Sweet's legal case and held the physician up as an example of achievement to inspire young African-American men.

=== Red Summer ===
In July 1919, Sweet was attending Howard University when he witnessed the Washington, D.C. race riot. The capital was among 20 cities that had outbreaks of racial violence in the so-called Red Summer of 1919. These resulted from postwar social tensions and competition for jobs and housing as World War I veterans returned home. There was little help for veterans trying to re-enter the workforce, and both whites and blacks resented their difficulties. Rumors of a white woman being attacked by blacks set off a mob that went to a black neighborhood and attacked people on the street. For the next three days, the riot flared up in different areas of the city, with white men, including many in military uniform, pulling black people from streetcars or attacking them on the street. Black civilians armed themselves and fought back. The riot resulted in the deaths of ten white people, including two police officers, and five black people. It was one of the first racial riots in which more white people died than black. Some 150 persons were wounded, 50 of them severely. President Woodrow Wilson called up the National Guard to suppress the violence, but a fierce rainstorm helped end the mob's enthusiasm as well.

For safety, Sweet and classmates stayed in their Chi Delta Mu fraternity house, four blocks from one area of fighting on H Street NE. He and his fraternity brothers were afraid to go out. Earlier while walking down the street, he had seen a white gang stop a passing streetcar, pull a black passenger to the sidewalk, and "beat him mercilessly". This sight stayed with him all his life.

=== Career ===
After completing his medical degree, Sweet moved to Detroit, Michigan in the late summer of 1921. He had previously lived in the city as early as 1910, spending his summer breaks from Wilberforce working in the city, but he had few connections in the medical field. He had difficulty finding work at a hospital due to his race, and he worked during the summers at Detroit restaurants. He could see that residents of Black Bottom, a neighborhood consisting of mainly working-class black families, urgently needed medical care. According to Kevin Boyle in Arc of Justice, "rudimentary care could have saved some of them. But Black Bottom didn't get even that".

Sweet saw a chance to practice medicine and help people. He paid a local pharmacy for space for an office. His first client, Elizabeth Riley, feared she had contracted tetanus because her jaw grew stiff. Sweet diagnosed a dislocated jaw rather than infection. He reset the bone, and Riley told neighborhood friends about his practice. His list of patients grew. Sweet gained a position as a medical examiner for Liberty Life Insurance, "an appointment that assured him a steady stream of patients he might not have otherwise have acquired".

=== Personal life ===
Sweet married Gladys Mitchell in December 1922. Born in Pittsburgh, she grew up in Detroit, a few miles north of Garland Street. She came from a prominent middle-class black family.

In 1923, Sweet temporarily left his practice for further medical studies in Vienna and Paris; his wife accompanied him. He attended lectures by noted physicians and scientists, including Marie Curie and Anton Eiselsberg. In Paris, he and his wife were treated as equals by the native French people and found it a kind of freedom. They encountered prejudice only at the American Hospital, which refused to admit his pregnant wife because of discrimination by white patients. On May 29, 1924, Gladys gave birth to a baby girl named Marguerite, whom they later called Iva. Sweet was furious that the American Hospital had "imperiled the health, and perhaps the life of Gladys and Iva".

The Sweets returned to Detroit in June 1924, moving back in with Gladys' parents. Ossian became affiliated with Dunbar Hospital, Detroit's first hospital founded to serve the black community. According to Boyle, Sweet earned the respect of his colleagues at Dunbar. He bought a new Buick touring car to replace his outdated Ford Model T, and reconnected with his brother Otis, who had opened his own dental practice. Having saved enough money, he purchased a house at 2905 Garland Street in an all-white neighborhood.

Sweet liked the appearance and size of the house, and what its location represented as a good neighborhood. Most African Americans in Detroit still lived in Black Bottom, but those who prospered moved to better neighborhoods, which Sweet wanted for his own family. Also, the National Association for the Advancement of Colored People (NAACP) had just been revived in Detroit after two years of inactivity. Members were organizing to challenge the city's well-defined residential color line. It seemed to be the ideal time if he wanted to buy a house in a better neighborhood.

== Housing discrimination ==
Restrictive covenants were stipulations written into property deeds, beginning around 1917 in the United States, to control who could live on the land connected to the deed. These covenants were intended primarily to exclude lower-class families and racial and ethnic minorities from certain neighborhoods, in order to preserve white racial homogeneity in a neighborhood. Covenants sometimes explicitly stated that the property could be sold only to a white buyer, but in other cases, they had restrictions associated with poorer buyers: multiple families could not live on the property, the home could not be divided into rental units, etc. By creating covenants that applied to low-income families, ethnic immigrants and racial minorities were also targeted, since they were frequently restricted to lower paying, blue-collar jobs.

In the case of Ossian Sweet, restrictive covenants aimed at low-income families would not prevent him from buying a house because he earned a doctor's salary. However, residents used restrictive covenants primarily to prevent racial integration of their white neighborhoods. If restrictive covenants did not prevent minorities from buying properties, white residents found other ways to block such people from moving in. Boyle argues that racial discrimination in Detroit's housing market was present but somewhat avoidable until approximately 1923 or 1924, when local real estate agents organized to coordinate their discriminatory practices.

The Sweet family had a difficult time finding a realtor, followed by difficulty finding a family who would sell them a house. According to Kevin Boyle's account, the Sweets were less than impressed with the house they were shown on Garland. The area was working class, filled with modest houses and two-family flats, but the location was ideal. It was close to Sweet's office and to Gladys' parents' home. On June 7, 1925, the Sweets bought the house for $18,500 (equivalent to $263,000 in 2024), about $6,000 more than the house's fair market value. The Sweets moved into the house on September 8, 1925.

Violence against property purchasers who violated the color line had become common by 1925 in Detroit. Boyle cites multiple examples of incidents in early 1925, including Fleta Mathies, who was ultimately acquitted after firing a gun at a mob outside her house that April; and Alexander Turner, who in June was intimidated into signing over the deed to his house by the "Tireman Avenue Improvement Association," backed by a mob of 1,000.

== Garland Street house attack ==
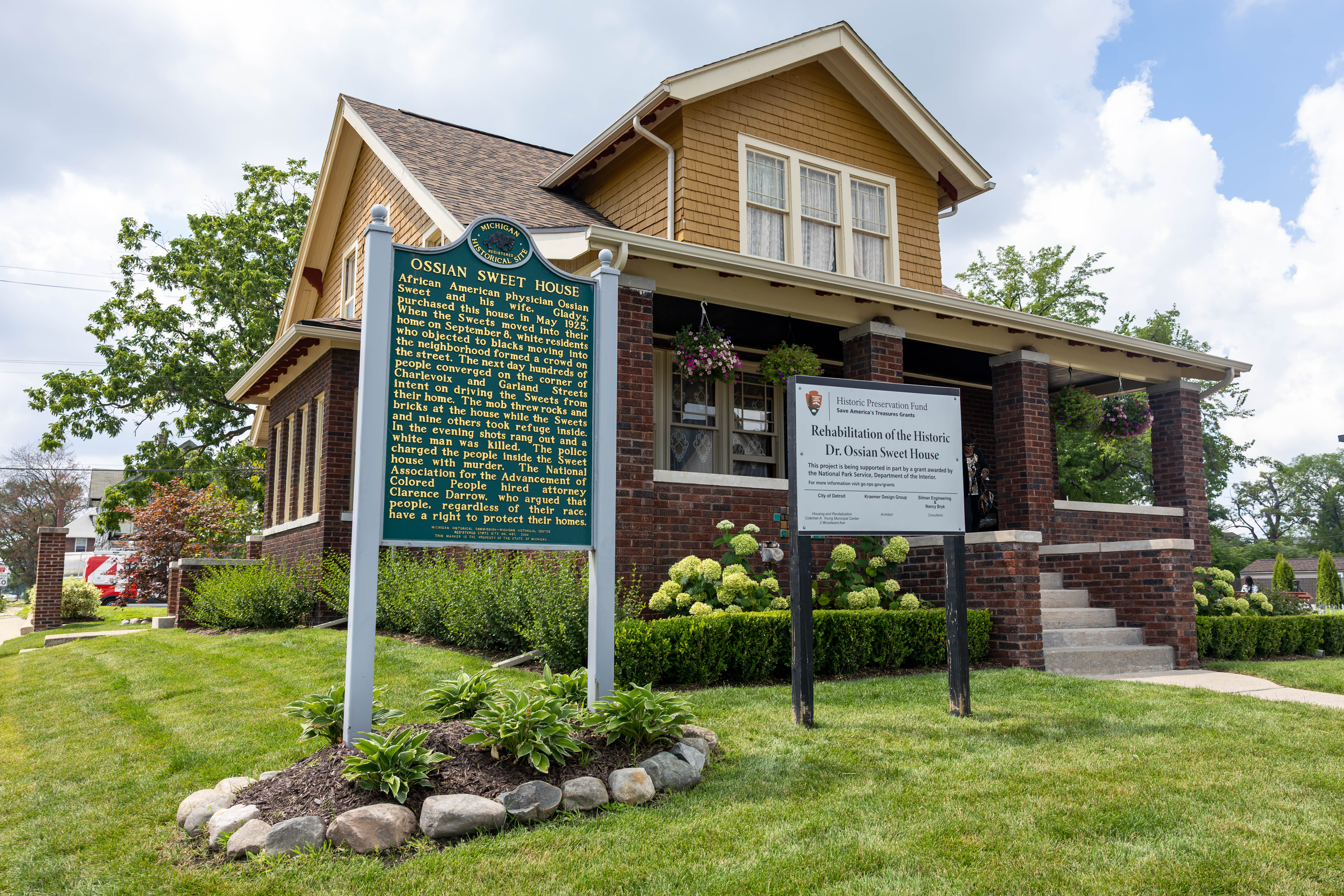
Sweet's house at 2905 Garland Street is now a museum

In the spring of 1925, other houses bought by middle-class blacks in white neighborhoods had been attacked. The Waterworks Park Improvement Association was formed by whites who opposed blacks moving into formerly all-white neighborhoods, as they feared social disruption and a loss of value in their homes. Buying a home was a very difficult and lengthy process, even for white homeowners. It was even more challenging for non-whites because most black buyers had to take out multiple mortgages in order to purchase a home and assumed more debt than whites of similar income did.

The Detroit Police Department was aware of the sentiment against Sweet, and police inspector Norton Schuknecht and a detail of officers were assigned outside the Sweet house to keep the peace. Sweet arranged privately for family and friends to help defend his home if needed. The men included Charles Washington (insurance man), Leonard Morse (colleague), William Davis, Otis and Henry Sweet (Ossian's brothers), John Latting (Henry Sweet's college friend), Norris Murray (handyman), and Joe Mack (chauffeur). Gladys Sweet stayed at the house with the men.

A crowd formed outside the house on Garland Street on the evening that Sweet moved in, but was dispersed by police. The next night, September 9, a larger crowd formed, and a group of teenagers began throwing stones and pieces of coal at the house, eventually breaking an upstairs window. Several of Sweet's friends were armed with guns and had taken positions upstairs. Someone fired from the house, hitting two white men. Eric Houghberg was wounded in the leg; Leon Breiner, who had been watching the events from a porch across the street, was killed. The 11 African Americans in the house were later taken to police headquarters, where they were questioned for five hours. All were charged with murder after continued interrogations. Although Gladys was released in early October on bail, the men were held at the Wayne County Jail until the trial was over.

=== 1925 trial ===
Ossian Sweet
- Court: Wayne County, Michigan

Case history
- Subsequent action: 2nd trial in 1926

Court membership
- Judge sitting: Frank Murphy

Case opinions
- Decision by: judge declares 1925 case mis-trial

The Sweets and their friends and family were tried for murder before Frank Murphy, who many considered to be one of the more progressive judges in the city. With the media working the city into a frenzy, Murphy denied the defendants' appeal to have the case dismissed. But Sweet and the other accused parties remained hopeful. When word of the mass arrest reached James Weldon Johnson, general secretary of the NAACP, he correctly predicted that the case could affect the civil rights struggle for African Americans.

The NAACP assisted Sweet and the other defendants in obtaining the money and support necessary for a defense at trial. The Detroit NAACP asked Johnson to send investigator Walter White to gain more information about the case. As the organization's funds were limited, it had to assess which cases to assist. They based their decision on the potential media visibility of the cases, as well as which trials would help further African Americans as a race and inspire social change, should the NAACP win. After deliberation, the NAACP supported the defendants in the Sweet trials, one of three major cases that the organization supported that year. The NAACP hired Charles H. Mahoney, a renowned African American lawyer from Detroit, to represent the defendants.

As September passed, life in the Wayne County Jail became slightly more comfortable for Sweet and the others. They received a steady stream of visitors, including Sweet's father, the elder Henry Sweet. On October 6, Gladys Sweet was released on bail provided by friends of her parents, to the relief of her husband.

In early October, the NAACP invited Clarence Darrow to join the Sweets' defense team, alongside Mahoney. They expected that Darrow's national reputation as one of the most brilliant defense attorneys in the US would attract desired publicity to the trial and its issues. Darrow accepted, and on October 15 the NAACP announced he would be taking control of the defense. By the time of the trial, charges had been dropped against three of the original 11 defendants.

On the morning of Friday, October 30, Clarence Darrow was ready for trial. An all-white jury was seated. By the end of November, and after long deliberations, most members of the jury came to an agreement that the eight remaining defendants should be acquitted; there were, however, a few holdouts. At this point, Judge Murphy dismissed the hung jury and declared a mistrial.

=== 1926 trials ===
Sweet and Gladys expected to head back to court within a few weeks, but there were delays. The court accepted Darrow's motion to have the trial of the defendants severed, with each to be tried separately. Sweet's youngest brother Henry was to be tried first. Almost three weeks after the announced trial date, the second trial started on Monday, April 19, 1926. Another all-white jury had been seated. After the jury acquitted Henry Sweet, the prosecuting attorney Robert Toms chose to dismiss the charges against the remaining seven defendants, including Sweet, as he concluded he was unlikely to gain conviction.

== Later life ==
After Henry Sweet was acquitted and the prosecutor dropped the case against the rest of the Sweets, Ossian Sweet's life continued to be difficult. Both Gladys and their daughter, Iva, were diagnosed with tuberculosis. Gladys believed she contracted the disease while in jail. Iva died in 1926, two months after her second birthday. During the next two years, Gladys' illness drove her and Sweet apart, and he returned to the apartment near Dunbar Memorial. She went to Tucson, Arizona, in order to benefit from the drier climate. This was a preferred treatment for tuberculosis which was often a fatal disease before antibiotics had been developed to treat it.

By mid-1928, Sweet finally regained possession of his house, which had been vacant since the shooting. A few months after his wife Gladys returned home, she died of tuberculosis at the age of 27. After her death, Sweet bought Garafalo's Drugstore. In 1929, he left his practice to run a hospital in the heart of the Black community. He eventually operated a few of these small hospitals, but none ever flourished financially.

In 1930, he decided to run for the presidency of the NAACP branch in Detroit, but lost by a wide margin. In the summer of 1939, Sweet learned that his brother Henry had also contracted tuberculosis and he died six months later.

By this point, Sweet's finances had failed. He was not able to pay off his land contract until 1950, when he assumed full ownership of the house. He faced too much debt after that to keep it. After selling the house in April 1958 to another black family, Sweet converted his former office above Garafalo's Drugstore into an apartment. Around this time, Sweet's physical and mental health began to decline. He had put on weight and slowed down. On March 20, 1960, he committed suicide in his bedroom with a gunshot to the head.

== Legacy ==
Sweet's life and his trial for murder have been memorialized as important events in the Civil Rights Movement.

- The Ossian H. Sweet House at 2905 Garland was designated as a registered Michigan State Historical Site, #S0461, in 1975 and was added to the National Register of Historic Places in 1985.
- Arthur Beer, wrote the play Malice Aforethought: The Sweet Trials, to explore the court cases. Initially produced in 1987 at University of Detroit Mercy, the play was revived in 2007 for its 20-year anniversary.
- Michigan Legal Milestones placed a commemorative plaque honoring the legacy of the Sweet Trials in the Wayne County Courthouse, now known as the Frank Murphy Hall of Justice in Detroit.
- Kevin Boyle's history Arc of Justice: A Saga of Race, Civil Rights, and Murder in the Jazz Age (2004), was a bestseller. It won the National Book Award for non-fiction and was a finalist that year for the Pulitzer Prize and the National Book Critics Circle Award.
- Boyle adapted his book as a play entitled The Sweet Trials, which dramatizes the history of the trials and their era. On February 2, 2007, Boyle was honored with a testimonial recognition from the city of Detroit for his contribution to civil rights.
- My Name is Ossian Sweet, a docudrama play by Gordon C. Bennett, was published in 2011 at www.HeartlandPlays.com.
- D. L. Patrick wrote the play, ECLIPSED: The Sun, the Moon and Gladys Atkinson Sweet, which premiered at Theatre Nova in Ann Arbor, Michigan, on April 10, 2025.
