= Decatur Township, Michigan =

- Township
- Motto: "Live, Work and Play in Decatur, a Friendly Community"
- Location within the state of Michigan Decatur Township, Michigan (the United States)
- Coordinates: 42°6′46″N 85°57′29″W
- Country: United States
- State: Michigan
- County: Van Buren

Area
  - Total: 35.5 sq mi (92.0 km^{2})
  - Land: 35.2 sq mi (91.1 km^{2})
  - Water: 0.35 sq mi (0.9 km^{2})
- Elevation: 784 ft (239 m)

Population (2020)
  - Total: 3,575
  - Density: 102/sq mi (39.2/km^{2})
- Time zone: UTC-5 (Eastern (EST))
  - Summer (DST): UTC-4 (EDT)
- ZIP code: 49045
- Area code: 269
- FIPS code: 26-21060
- GNIS feature ID: 1626166
- Website: Township of Decatur, Michigan

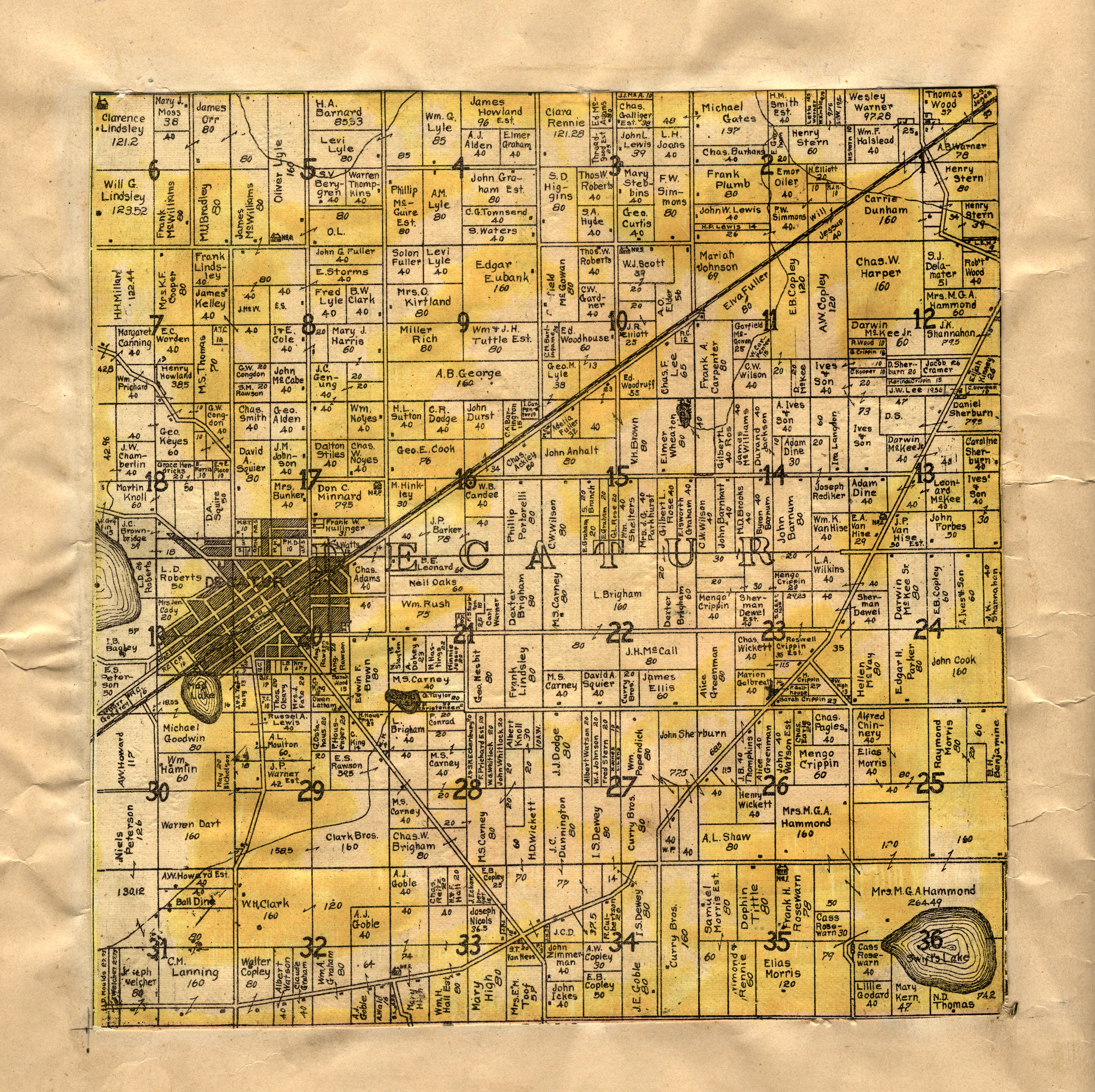
A 1906 cadastral map of Decatur Township, showing property lines and names of rural landowners

Decatur Township is a civil township of Van Buren County in the U.S. state of Michigan. The population was 3,575 at the 2020 census. The village of Decatur is located within the township.

== Communities ==
- Roth Valley is an unincorporated community in the township on Roth Rd. and Valley Rd. Also in adjacent Wayne, Volinia and Hamilton Townships.

== History ==
Decatur Township and the Village of Decatur are named after Stephen Decatur, Jr., celebrated as a hero of the War of 1812. Decatur Township was established in 1861. The township is largely a farming area.

== Geography ==
According to the United States Census Bureau, the township has a total area of 35.5 square miles (92 km^{2}), of which 35.2 square miles (91 km^{2}) is land and 0.3 square miles (0.78 km^{2}) (0.98%) is water.

== Demographics ==
As of the census of 2000, there were 3,916 people, 1,451 households, and 1,021 families residing in the township. The population density was 111.3 inhabitants per square mile (43.0/km^{2}). There were 1,611 housing units at an average density of 45.8 per square mile (17.7/km^{2}). The racial makeup of the township was 89.30% White, 4.62% African American, 1.17% Native American, 0.26% Asian, 0.10% Pacific Islander, 2.66% from other races, and 1.89% from two or more races. Hispanic or Latino of any race were 4.98% of the population.

There were 1,451 households, out of which 34.6% had children under the age of 18 living with them, 52.0% were married couples living together, 12.9% had a female householder with no husband present, and 29.6% were non-families. 24.3% of all households were made up of individuals, and 9.9% had someone living alone who was 65 years of age or older. The average household size was 2.66 and the average family size was 3.13.

In the township the population was spread out, with 28.2% under the age of 18, 8.7% from 18 to 24, 28.8% from 25 to 44, 21.5% from 45 to 64, and 12.7% who were 65 years of age or older. The median age was 35 years. For every 100 females, there were 99.9 males. For every 100 females age 18 and over, there were 93.7 males.

The median income for a household in the township was $35,754, and the median income for a family was $39,122. Males had a median income of $27,585 versus $22,183 for females. The per capita income for the township was $16,912. About 11.9% of families and 14.2% of the population were below the poverty line, including 18.0% of those under age 18 and 11.4% of those age 65 or over.

== Education ==
Decatur Township Public Schools are part of the Decatur Public Schools district. The district has one elementary school, one middle school and one high school. Students attend Decatur High School.
