= The Shattering: America in the 1960s =

2021 book by Kevin Boyle

- Author: Kevin Boyle
- Language: English
- Publisher: W.W. Norton & Company
- Publication date: 2021
- Publication place: United States
- Pages: 496
- ISBN: 978-1-324-03611-1

The Shattering: America in the 1960s is a 2021 book by historian Kevin Boyle, published by W.W. Norton & Company. The book depicts American history throughout the 1960s.

The book's title refers to a fragile but stable social fabric that was present in the United States in the 1950s, held together by racial segregation, an expanding military industrial complex and repression of sexual rights; a social order that would be shattered in the 1960s.

== Narrative ==
The book depicts American history from the late 1950s to the early 1970s, focusing on three main themes; American foreign and domestic policies during the Cold War and the Vietnam War, the sexual revolution of the 1960s, and the civil rights movement. However, the book aims to depict these events from the novel perspective of Americans outside the majority of the white, baby boomers who ascended to the newly formed middle class during the 1950s and 1960s. In addition to depicting events from the 1960s involving well known figures such as John F. Kennedy, Martin Luther King Jr. and Richard Nixon, the book also includes narrative historical detail of relatively lesser known figures such as civil rights activists Bayard Rustin and Ella Baker, Elizabeth Eckford (one of the Little Rock Nine) and women's reproductive rights advocate Estelle Griswold. The book also details the experiences of non-historical figures during the 1960s such as the father of a student killed during the Kent State shooting and an American serviceman during the Vietnam War. The book also details the rise of the modern day American Conservative movement.

== Reception ==
The book was generally well received by critics. Writing in The New York Times, critic Jennifer Szalai commended Boyle for re-examining events of the 1960s in a new lens, in light of new and emerging historical scholarship regarding the decade. Writing for the Washington Post, historian Lily Geismer states: "What distinguishes “The Shattering” is not only the way it deepens the portrait of the past, but also how it foreshadows the politics of the future". Geismer also praised Boyle for his ability to transform more technical historical scholarship or analysis into "artful and empathetic storytelling". Writing for the Los Angeles Times, literary critic Andrew Lewis, also had a positive response to the literary approach that Boyle had used in the book; favorably rating Boyle's narrative style that made the historical material more accessible to everyday people, in addition to academics.
