= Wayne County Prosecutor's Office =

Prosecuting Attorney of Wayne County

Prosecuting Attorney of Wayne County
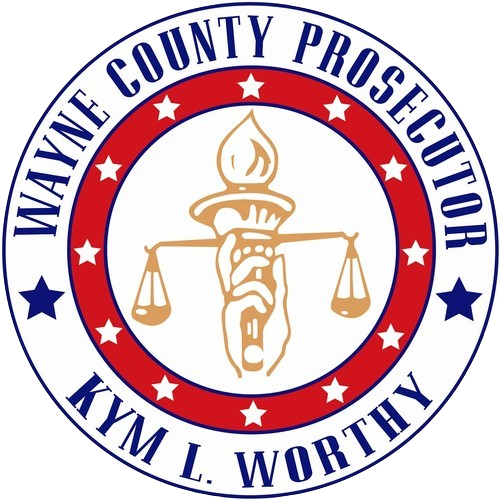
- Incumbent; Kym Worthy since January 6, 2004
- Seat: Detroit, MI
- Term length: 4 years
- Website: https://www.waynecountymi.gov/Government/Elected-Officials/Prosecutor

The Prosecuting Attorney of Wayne County is in charge of the office that prosecutes felony and misdemeanor crimes that occur within Wayne County, Michigan, United States, the largest of Michigan's 83 counties. The current prosecuting attorney is Kym L. Worthy.

According to the prosecuting attorney's official website, the office prosecutes over 52% of all felony cases in Michigan. The office is the 10th largest case load of criminal cases in America.

The published mission of the office: "The mission of the Wayne County Prosecutor's Office is to pursue justice, to safeguard the community by demanding accountability for those who commit crimes and to enhance the quality of life by changing the culture of violence."

The current makeup of the office is 180 assistant prosecuting attorneys, 24 investigators, and 70 clerical and non-lawyer support staff.

== History ==
Before Michigan became a state in the Territorial dates, the Territorial Governor could appoint Public Prosecutors for a term of two years.

When the office of the Prosecuting Attorney was the county's Lawyer to advise County officials. "The principal business of the Prosecuting Attorney is the conduct of criminal cases. The office was also responsible for representing the county in all suits where the County was named as a party. In exercising this function, he is not, or should not be, a prosecutor in the ordinary acceptance of the word, for the law provided that he shall safeguard the rights of defendants." He is not even permitted to tell a jury that the defendant is guilty of the offense charged."

On June 17, 1971, the Wayne County Board of Commissioners passed a resolution to employ a civil counsel to act as the office of corporation counsel to represent the city in all civil cases. Removing the power to represent the county in civil cases from the County Prosecutor. This was done under a state law allowed at the time.

""WHEREAS, the Board of Commissioners to implement County Reorganization, will need independent, impartial and unbiased legal counsel to represent the Board of Commissioners in all legal matters relating to Wayne County."

"RESOLVED, that the Civil Division of the Prosecuting Attorney's Office be removed from the Office of the Prosecuting Attorney and that the Civil Division be designated as the Office of the Wayne County Corporation Counsel."

The resolution claimed that the "complexity of civil litigation involving the county" had increased, and the Prosecuting attorney had increased the number of criminal prosecutors to 37 but not increased the staff of the civil division.

The then-county prosecutor William L. Cahalan sued over this resolution. Wayne County Prosecuting Attorney v Wayne County Board of Commissioners (1972) 205 N.W.2d 27, 44 Mich. App. 144. The Court of Appeals found the board of commissioners did not abuse their discretion under state law. The removing the civil caseload from the prosecutor's office.

== Makeup of the Office ==
Full descriptions of WCPO's units are available on the Prosecutor's Office website.

Communications Division

Conviction Integrity Unit

Criminal Investigation Division (CID)

Finance and Administration

General Trials Division

Information and Technology Division

1. Information Technology Unit (WCPOIT)
2. Litigation Technology Unit (LTU)
3. Discovery and Information Service Communication Operations (DISCO)
4. Information Unit (WCPOINFO)

Juvenile Division

Research, Training and Appeals Division

1. Appeals Division
2. Juvenile Life Without Parole Unit (JLWOP)
3. Training Unit

Screening and District Courts Division

1. District Courts Section
2. Diversion Section
3. Screening Section

Special Operations Division

1. Homicide Unit
2. Public Integrity Unit (PIU)
3. Asset Forfeiture Unit
4. Deed & Mortgage Fraud Unit
5. Prosecutor's Auto Theft Unit (PATU)
6. Community Prosecution Unit

Special Victim's Division

1. Animal Protection Unit
2. Child Abuse Unit
3. Domestic Violence Unit
4. Elder Abuse Unit
5. LGBTQ Unit
6. Sexual Assault Kit Task Force (SAK)
7. Sexual Assault Team (SAT)

Victim Services Unit

== Initiatives & Programs ==
Full descriptions of WCPO's initiatives and programs are available on the Prosecutor's Office website.

- Citizens Academy
- Copper and Scrap Metal Theft Initiative
- Drug House Program "No Child Left Inside"
- Felony Non-Support
- Internship Volunteer Program
- Lead Poising
- Mental Health Diversion
- Nuisance Abatement Padlocking of Blind Pigs/ After-Hours Establishments
- Pre-Trial Diversion Program
- Right TRAC
- Safe Schools Initiative
- Teen Court
- Teenage Victims of Sexual Assault
- Vehicle Forfeiture Program Operating While Intoxicated
- Violent Video Game Parent Awareness

== List of Prosecuting Attorneys of Wayne County Prosecuting Attorneys under Michigan Territorial ==
Num.	Name	Term
1	Charles Larned	1819–1828
2	Warner Wing	1828
3	B.F.H. Witherell	1829
4	Warner Wing	1830
5	B.F.H. Witherell	1831
6	James Q Adams	1833
7	B.F.H. Witherell	1834

== List of Prosecuting Attorneys of Wayne County Prosecuting Attorneys under 1835 Constitution ==
Num.	Name	Term
1	Benj. F. H. Wiherell	1835–1840
2	James A. Van Dyke	1840–1843
3	A.W. Buell	1843–1846
4	William Hale	1846–1849
5	D. Stuart	1849–1853
6	A. T. McReynolds	1853–1855
7	J.C. P. Emmons	1855–1857
8	J. Knox Galvin	1857–1860
9	D.E. Harbaugh	1860–1862
10	J. Knox Galvin	1862–1866
11	Jared Patchin	1866–1867
12	G.Hebden	1867–1869
13	Philip J. Van Dyke	1869–1873
14	Fitzwilliam H. Chambers	1873–1875
15	John G. Hawley	1875–1877
16	Henry N. Brevoort	1877–1881
17	Michael Firnane	1881–1883
18	James Caplis	1883–1885
19	George F. Robinson	1885–1889
20	James V. D. Wilcox	1889–1891
21	Samuel W. Burroughs	1891–1893
22	Allan H. Frazer	1893–1901
23	Ormond F. Hunt	1901–1907
24	George F. Robison	1907 (Died in office)
25	George B Yerkes	1907–? Appointed to fill the vacancy

== Partial List of Wayne County Prosecuting Attorneys ==
Num.	Name	Term
X	Paul W. Voorhies	1921
X	W.T. "Peck" Powers	1926
X	Robert M. Toms	1927
X	James E. Chenot	1929
X	Harry S. Toy	1931
X	Duncan C. McCrea	1939
X	William E. Dowling	1944
X	James N. McNally	1949
X	Gerald K. Obrien	1946–1959
X	Samuel H. Olsen	1957–1967
X	William L. Cahalan	1967–1983
X	John O'Hair	1983–2000
X	Mike Duggan	2001–2003
X	Kym L. Worthy	2004–present
