= Decatur, Michigan =

- Village
- Location of Decatur, Michigan
- Coordinates: 42°6′35″N 85°58′24″W
- Country: United States
- State: Michigan
- County: Van Buren
- Established: 1861

Government
  - Type: General Law Village
  - Village Manager: Matthew Newton
  - Village President: Ali Elwaer

Area
  - Total: 1.43 sq mi (3.70 km^{2})
  - Land: 1.35 sq mi (3.50 km^{2})
  - Water: 0.077 sq mi (0.20 km^{2})
- Elevation: 790 ft (240 m)

Population (2020)
  - Total: 1,651
  - Density: 1,222/sq mi (471.8/km^{2})
- Time zone: UTC-5 (Eastern (EST))
  - Summer (DST): UTC-4 (EDT)
- ZIP code: 49045
- Area code: 269
- FIPS code: 26-21040
- GNIS feature ID: 0624435
- Website: www.decaturmi.org

Decatur is a village in Van Buren County, Michigan, United States. As of the 2020 census, Decatur had a population of 1,651. The village is located within Decatur Township.

== History ==
Decatur Township and the Village of Decatur are named after Stephen Decatur Jr., celebrated as a hero of the War of 1812.

Decatur was founded in 1847 and incorporated as a village in 1861.

== Churches ==
Decatur contains many denominations and is home to a variety of churches, including one of its oldest churches, Decatur First Reformed Church.

== Geography ==
According to the United States Census Bureau, the village has a total area of 1.43 square miles (3.70 km^{2}), of which 1.35 square miles (3.50 km^{2}) is land and 0.08 square miles (0.21 km^{2}) is water.

== Demographics ==
Historical population
Census	Pop.	Note	%±
1860	564		—
1870	1,420		151.8%
1880	1,267		−10.8%
1890	1,199		−5.4%
1900	1,356		13.1%
1910	1,286		−5.2%
1920	1,270		−1.2%
1930	1,582		24.6%
1940	1,599		1.1%
1950	1,664		4.1%
1960	1,827		9.8%
1970	1,764		−3.4%
1980	1,915		8.6%
1990	1,760		−8.1%
2000	1,838		4.4%
2010	1,819		−1.0%
2020	1,651		−9.2%
U.S. Decennial Census

=== 2020 census ===
As of the 2020 census, Decatur had a population of 1,651. The median age was 38.7 years. 23.2% of residents were under the age of 18 and 16.7% of residents were 65 years of age or older. For every 100 females there were 94.5 males, and for every 100 females age 18 and over there were 90.4 males age 18 and over.

0.0% of residents lived in urban areas, while 100.0% lived in rural areas.

There were 683 households in Decatur, of which 32.4% had children under the age of 18 living in them. Of all households, 33.5% were married-couple households, 21.8% were households with a male householder and no spouse or partner present, and 33.4% were households with a female householder and no spouse or partner present. About 31.1% of all households were made up of individuals and 12.1% had someone living alone who was 65 years of age or older.

There were 764 housing units, of which 10.6% were vacant. The homeowner vacancy rate was 3.3% and the rental vacancy rate was 6.7%.

Racial composition as of the 2020 census
Race	Number	Percent
White	1,343	81.3%
Black or African American	34	2.1%
American Indian and Alaska Native	32	1.9%
Asian	2	0.1%
Native Hawaiian and Other Pacific Islander	2	0.1%
Some other race	72	4.4%
Two or more races	166	10.1%
Hispanic or Latino (of any race)	203	12.3%

=== 2010 census ===
As of the census of 2010, there were 1,819 people, 701 households, and 448 families living in the village. The population density was 1,347.4 inhabitants per square mile (520.2/km^{2}). There were 781 housing units at an average density of 578.5 per square mile (223.4/km^{2}). The racial makeup of the village was 87.6% White, 2.7% African American, 1.2% Native American, 0.3% Asian, 0.1% Pacific Islander, 4.1% from other races, and 4.0% from two or more races. Hispanic or Latino of any race were 9.4% of the population.

There were 701 households, of which 36.8% had children under the age of 18 living with them, 40.1% were married couples living together, 18.3% had a female householder with no husband present, 5.6% had a male householder with no wife present, and 36.1% were non-families. 30.0% of all households were made up of individuals, and 12% had someone living alone who was 65 years of age or older. The average household size was 2.55 and the average family size was 3.10.

The median age in the village was 34.6 years. 28.1% of residents were under the age of 18; 8.3% were between the ages of 18 and 24; 26.9% were from 25 to 44; 23.2% were from 45 to 64; and 13.5% were 65 years of age or older. The gender makeup of the village was 47.6% male and 52.4% female.

=== 2000 census ===
As of the census of 2000, there were 1,838 people, 725 households, and 458 families living in the village. The population density was 1,599.1 inhabitants per square mile (617.4/km^{2}). There were 792 housing units at an average density of 689.1 per square mile (266.1/km^{2}). The racial makeup of the village was 87.65% White, 5.82% African American, 1.41% Native American, 0.27% Asian, 1.85% from other races, and 2.99% from two or more races. Hispanic or Latino of any race were 4.08% of the population.

There were 725 households, out of which 33.2% had children under the age of 18 living with them, 42.5% were married couples living together, 15.3% had a female householder with no husband present, and 36.7% were non-families. 31.9% of all households were made up of individuals, and 14.2% had someone living alone who was 65 years of age or older. The average household size was 2.49 and the average family size was 3.09.

In the village, the population was spread out, with 28.6% under the age of 18, 8.8% from 18 to 24, 28.9% from 25 to 44, 18.9% from 45 to 64, and 14.8% who were 65 years of age or older. The median age was 34 years. For every 100 females, there were 92.3 males. For every 100 females age 18 and over, there were 83.9 males.

The median income for a household in the village was $30,550, and the median income for a family was $36,417. Males had a median income of $27,566 versus $20,703 for females. The per capita income for the village was $14,098. About 18.2% of families and 20.9% of the population were below the poverty line, including 31.7% of those under age 18 and 12.0% of those age 65 or over.

== Education ==
Decatur is part of the Decatur Public Schools district. The district has one elementary school, one middle school, and one high school.

== Notable people ==
- Edgar Bergen, an American actor and radio performer, best known as a ventriloquist.
- Charles H. Mahoney, the first African American to serve as a delegate to the United Nations.

== See also ==
- List of villages in Michigan
