= George Crockett III =

American judge (1938–2016)

George W. Crockett III
- Born: December 23, 1938; Fairmont, West Virginia
- Died: July 1, 2016 (aged 77); West Palm Beach, Florida, U.S.
- Education: Morehouse College, BA, History, Spanish, Detroit College of Law

Judge George William Crockett III served on the Detroit Recorder's Court (later the Wayne County Circuit Court) from 1976 until 2003. He was known for presiding over the 1993 Malice Green case, and for his father, George Crockett Jr., an influential civil rights activist, congressman and judge who preceded and served with him on the Recorder's Court.

== Early life and education ==
Crockett was born in Fairmont, West Virginia, to parents George Crockett Jr., and Ethelene Jones Crockett, an influential physician, activist, and Michigan's first African-American female OB/GYN, who would go on to lead the American Lung Association.

Crockett graduated in 1959 from Windsor Mountain School, in Lenox, MA and Morehouse College in Atlanta, graduating in 1961. During his time at Morehouse, he was arrested at a sit-in protest against racial segregation. Crockett went on to receive a Juris Doctor degree from the Detroit College of Law in 1964.

== Legal career ==
After law school, Crockett went into private practice at Goodman, Crockett, Eden, Robb and Philo in Detroit (his father's firm, and one of the first racially integrated law firms in the country) and with Alphonse Lewis Jr. in Grand Rapids, Michigan. From 1970 to 1976 he worked at the Legal Aid and Defender Association of Detroit, under renowned attorney Myzell Sowell, who during his twelve-year tenure built the Defender Association into an incubator of Detroit's legal talent; sixteen of the attorneys who worked under Sowell in this time went on to become judges.

In 1977, Crockett was elected to the Detroit Recorder's Court as a judge, where he briefly served on the same bench as his father, who was the Chief Judge of the Recorder's Court until his election to Congress in 1980. The younger Crockett stayed on the Recorder's court until its merger with the Wayne County Circuit Court in 1997, where he continued to serve until his retirement in 2003. Crockett was succeeded on Michigan's Third Circuit Judicial Court by Judge Edward Ewell Jr.

Crockett was also a member of the Wolverine Bar Association, a group founded by African-American lawyers when they were forbidden from joining the Michigan Bar Association.

== Notable Legal Case ==
Crockett became known nationwide for presiding over the trial of police officers Walter Budzyn and Larry Nevers for the 1992 killing of Malice Green. The trial attracted controversy and public scrutiny as an example of police brutality in the charged atmosphere following the 1991 Rodney King beating in Los Angeles. Assistant Prosecutor Kym Worthy led the prosecution team. The two white Detroit police officers were found guilty by two separate juries of second-degree murder, and Crockett sentenced them to 12–25 years and 8–18 years respectively.

Although the case was a media spectacle and included some disputes between the Detroit news media and the Judge, Crockett was praised for his commitment to fairness. According to Edward Littlejohn, a Wayne State University Law School professor emeritus, “his handling of that case probably prevented upheavals in the community. He kept everybody calm. I thought he was the perfect judge for that case ... He was fair across the board ...”

== Death ==
Crockett remained active after his retirement, and moved to Florida in 2015. He died on Friday, July 1, 2016, from lung cancer.
