= John Latting =

American baseball player

- First baseman
- Born: April 10, 1900; Helena, Arkansas, U.S.
- Died: March 21, 1969 (aged 68); Detroit, Michigan, U.S.
- Threw: Right

Negro league baseball debut
- 1926, for the Dayton Marcos

Last appearance
- 1926, for the Dayton Marcos

Teams
- Dayton Marcos (1926)

John Marquess Latting (April 10, 1900 – March 21, 1969) was an American Negro league first baseman in the 1920s.

A native of Helena, Arkansas, Latting attended Wilberforce University and captained the school's baseball team in 1922. In 1925, he was one of eleven people represented by Clarence Darrow who were arrested but not convicted as part of the nationally-publicized murder case involving Dr. Ossian Sweet. Latting played briefly for the Dayton Marcos in 1926, a club led by player-manager Eddie Huff, who was Latting's former Wilberforce teammate. After graduating from Wilberforce in 1927, Latting went on to earn a degree in dentistry from Howard University in 1932. He died in Detroit, Michigan in 1969 at age 68.
