= Fred Rochelle =

African American lynched in the US

Fred Rochelle (c. 1885 – May 29, 1901) was an African-American teenager from Bartow, Florida, who was lynched and burned to death on May 29, 1901, following the alleged rape and murder of a white woman, Rena Smith Taggart, the previous day. He was said to have been seen near where Taggart's body was found. Newspapers misreported the 16-year-old boy as "35 years of age". A mob of over 100 men as well as bloodhounds from Mulberry and Pebble was assembled to search for him but a local paper mentioned a possible lynching before any evidence was recovered or he was charged.

Rochelle was captured two days later by two black men, who evaded the mob and turned Rochelle over to the Sheriff of Polk County in Lakeland, Florida. Ten minutes later, Rochelle was turned over to a mob. The mob took Rochelle back to Bartow. A special train was arranged from Lakeland so that a large crowd of spectators could attend a "barbecue" in Bartow where Rochelle was to be the "chief actor." He was taken to the site of the Taggart murder, where he was chained to a barrel and doused with quantities of kerosene. At 6:00 p.m. the match was struck. He was burned alive for 15 minutes, and the crowd dispersed by 8:30 that evening.

== Legacy ==
Ossian Sweet, an African-American doctor in Detroit who was tried for defending his house from a mob in 1925, testified at his trial that he had witnessed Rochelle being lynched as a five-year-old child in Bartow.
