= Detroit waste incinerator =

American waste-to-energy plant (1989-2023)

Coordinates: 42.368159°N 83.051898°W

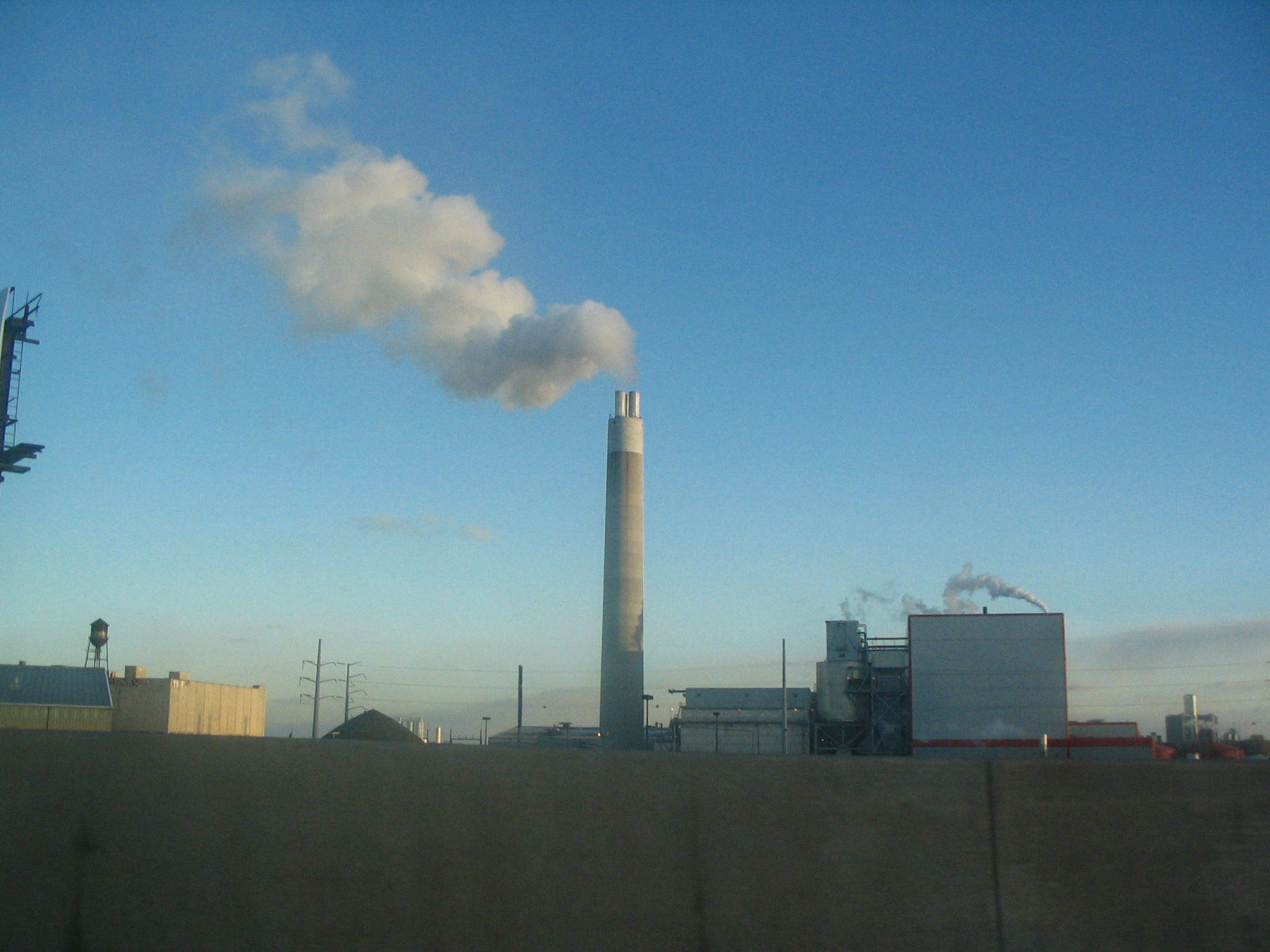
- In 2006
- Operated: 1989-2019
- Location: 5700 Russell Street
- Area: 15 acres (6.1 ha)
- Website: detroitrenewablepower.com
- Defunct: 2019

The Detroit waste incinerator, also known as the Detroit Resource Recovery Facility and as Detroit Renewable Power, was an American waste-to-energy plant that operated in Detroit, Michigan from 1989 until 2019. It was demolished from 2022 to 2023.

== Description ==
The Detroit waste incinerator, also known as the Detroit Resource Recovery Facility, was a waste-to-energy facility located at 5700 Russell Street, Detroit. The plant was also often known by the name of operator Detroit Renewable Power. It covered 15 acres.

While operating, the plant processed 5,000 tons of waste on a daily basis and provided energy to 75,000 nearby homes. The plant was described by Detroit authorities as "the largest municipal solid waste incinerator in Michigan."

== History ==
Plans for the incinerator were announced in May 1986. In 1987, Greenpeace protested at the site, putting up a banner that read "Mayor Coleman Young - more cancer isn't the answer stop the Detroit Incinerator." Costing approximately $500 million, the plant opened in 1989.

Initially operated by the City of Detroit, the plant was operated by Detroit Renewable Power until March 27, 2019. Odors from the facility caused complaints from neighbor residents who also complained about respiratory issues. Local residents launched a campaign to close the plant, and shared concerns that the plant burned waste from affluent neighborhoods predominantly occupied by white communities, polluting the air near the plant which is surrounded by poorer communities, predominantly occupied by black residents. Local group Breathe Free Detroit organized a petition to close the plant.

Demolition started in 2022, managed by Homrich Wrecking company. The plant's smokestack was demolished on June 11, 2023.

== See also ==
- List of power stations in Michigan
- Siwatu-Salama Ra, activist who opposed the plant
