= Decatur Public Schools (Michigan) =

School district in Michigan

Address
- 110 Cedar Street Decatur, Van Buren County, Michigan, 49045; United States

District information
- Grades: PreKindergarten–12
- Superintendent: Patrick Creagan
- Schools: 2
- Budget: $12,283,000 2022-2023 expenditures
- NCES District ID: 2611670

Students and staff
- Students: 755 (2024-2025)
- Teachers: 42.63 (on an FTE basis) (2024-2025)
- Staff: 88.01 FTE (2024-2025)
- Student–teacher ratio: 17.71 (2024-2025)
- District mascot: Raiders

Other information
- Website: www.raiderpride.org

Decatur Public Schools is a public school district in West Michigan. In Van Buren County, Michigan, it serves Decatur, Hamilton Township, and parts of the townships of Decatur, Lawrence, and Paw Paw. In Cass County, it serves parts of the townships of Volinia and Wayne.

== History ==
Decatur's school district was organized in 1862 and the first brick school was built in 1864. The first class graduated in 1867.

The high school burned down in 1919, and a new high school opened in fall 1920. It became a K-6 school in 1963 called Edgar Bergen Elementary, and it was later called Bergen Alternative High School. It closed in 2007.

A new elementary school opened in 1952. In 1982, the school was named for Marion Davis, a long-serving teacher and principal who retired in 1971.

Ground was broken for the current junior/senior high school building on December 3, 1962. The ceremony came hours after four school board members won a court case in which they were threatened with a recall election for not choosing the building site preferred by voters. The Decatur Better Schools Association was found not to have collected enough signatures on their petitions, and when appealed to the Michigan Supreme Court, the court declined to hear the case. The building, designed by architecture firm O'Dell, Hewlett & Luckenbach, was dedicated on March 15, 1964.

In May 1965, rumors of a monster in a 152-acre tract of woods owned by the district sparked a craze among students. For three consecutive nights, they ventured into the woods armed with weapons in search of the creature. To prevent accidents and reduce the risk of fire among the dry pine trees, the sheriff warned of a crackdown on anyone entering the woods, a warning that was reported in the local newspaper. The following evening, only seven violators were found. "This monster thing is a hoax," stated the sheriff.

A new middle school section, connected to the junior/senior high and elementary schools, opened in fall 2001. Students in fourth through sixth grades were moved from Bergen Elementary, while seventh- and eighth-grade students were transferred from the high school to the new addition.

== Schools ==
The district's schools share a building on the northwest side of Decatur.

Schools in Decatur Public Schools district
School	Address	Notes
Decatur Junior/Senior High School	110 Cedar St., Decatur	Grades 9-12.
Marion Davis Elementary	409 N. Phelps St., Decatur	Grades K-5.
