= Ethelene Crockett =

American physician

Ethelene Jones Crockett
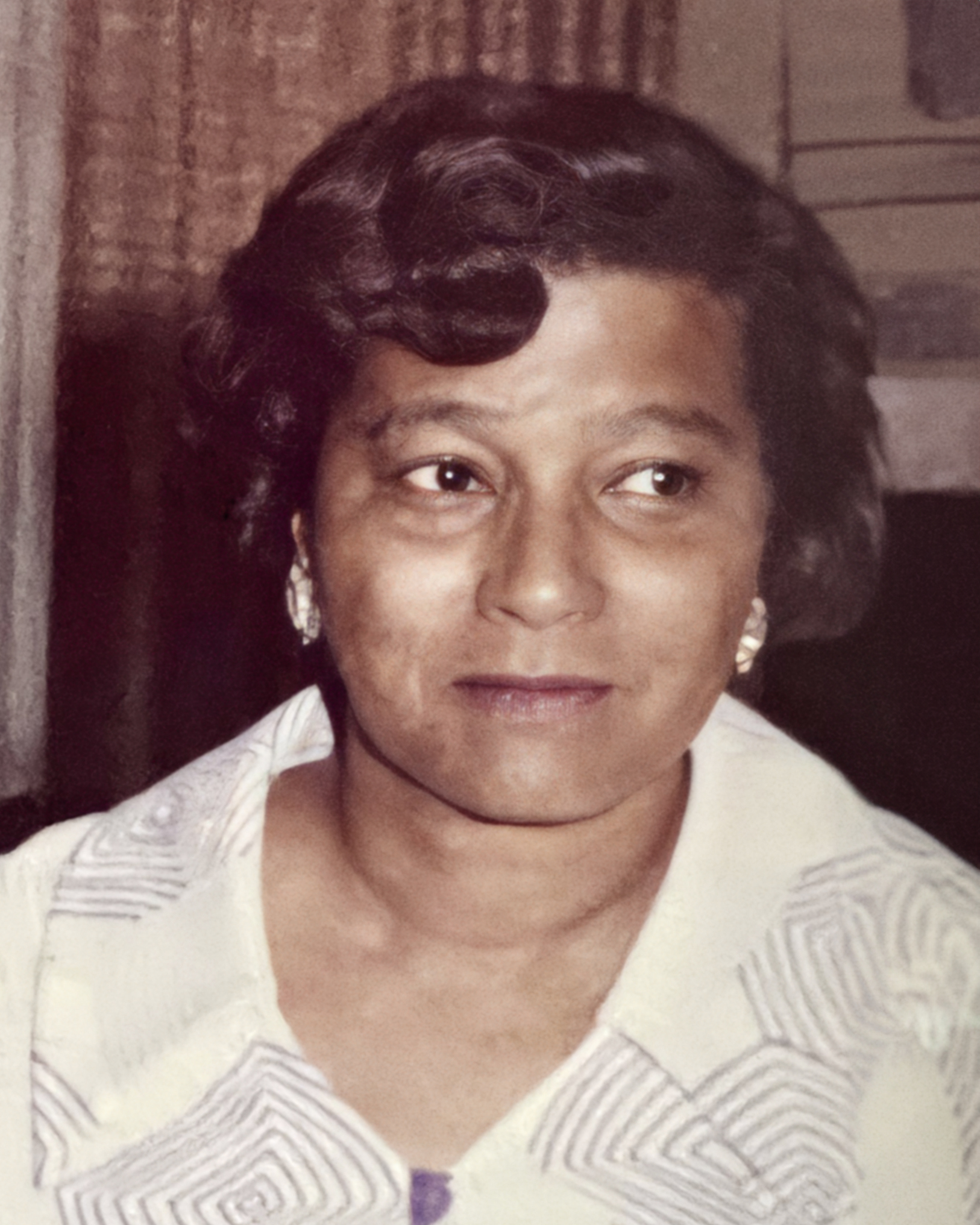
- Crockett in 1972
- Born: September 26, 1914; St. Joseph, Michigan
- Died: December 28, 1978 (aged 64); Detroit, Michigan, U.S.
- Education: Jackson College(1934); University of Michigan; Howard University College of Medicine
- Occupation: physician
- Spouse: George Crockett Jr. (m. 1934)
- Children: 3, including George Crockett III

Ethelene Jones Crockett (1914–1978) was an American physician and activist from Detroit. She was Michigan's first African-American female board certified OB/GYN, and the first woman to be president of the American Lung Association. In 1988, Crockett was inducted posthumously into the Michigan Women's Hall of Fame.

== Early life and education ==
Ethelene Jones was born in 1914 and Jackson, Michigan graduated from Jackson High School in and then attended Jackson Junior College (now Jackson College), where she graduated in 1934. She attended the University of Michigan, where she met and married George Crockett Jr. In 1942, she entered Howard University College of Medicine, when she was 28 years old, married and mother to three children. No hospital in Detroit would accept her in a residency program because she was African American and a woman. Crockett completed her obstetrics/gynecology residency at Sydenham Hospital in New York, where she joined her husband, George Crockett, who was a member of the legal team defending 11 Communist Party leaders accused of teaching the overthrow of the Federal government, a violation of the Smith Act. The trial was in New York and became known as the Foley Square Trial.

== Medical career ==
After medical school, Crockett became Michigan's first African-American woman to be board-certified in obstetrics and gynecology, and went on to practice medicine in Detroit for decades.

In 1960, Crockett spent a month touring Europe and the Soviet Union with 16 other African-American medical doctors, on a study trip sponsored by the National Medical Association (NMA). The trip was led by Dr. Edward C. Mazique, the president of the NMA, with the purpose of assessing medical advances in other countries and exchanging best practices; it was also considered a goodwill mission to the Soviet Union.

Crockett directed the Detroit Maternal Infant Care Project from 1967 to 1970. She also helped design the Detroit Model Neighborhood Comprehensive Health Center. In the 1970s, Crockett was a gynecologist at Grace and Harper Hospital in Detroit.

== Activism ==
Crockett was active in a wide variety of organizations that dealt with health and social issues. She was an advocate for public daycare centers for working women as well as family planning, and she often lectured on these and other topics. In 1972 she led the fight to liberalize Michigan's abortion laws.

In 1977, shortly before her death, she was named president of the American Lung Association. She was the first woman to attain this position in the organization, which was by then more than seven decades old. Crockett met with President Jimmy Carter at the White House on behalf of the American Lung Association in November 1978. She spoke about the need for funding to combat tuberculosis. Crockett, appearing with ventriloquist Shari Lewis and puppet Lamb Chop, presented Carter with a sheet of the association's Christmas Seals.

== Awards and legacy ==
In 1971, the Detroit Free Press named Crockett one of nine “Detroit’s Most Successful Women.”

In 1972, Crockett received the “Woman of the Year” award from the Zeta Phi Beta sorority, Beta Omicron Zeta chapter, Detroit, MI. Michigan Supreme Court Justice G. Mennen Williams was the keynote speaker.

In 1978, the Detroit Medical Society named Crockett “Physician of the Year.”

Crockett was the keynote speaker at the Jackson College commencement 1972 ceremony. After her death in 1978, the college established a yearly award in her honor, the Dr. Ethelene Jones Crockett Distinguished Alumni Award, which goes to alumni who display “positive personal involvement for the betterment of mankind with his/her community, state, nation or world.” Recipients have included Jon Lake, in 2018, and Laura Stanton, in 2017.

In 1980, the first Detroit Public School Vocational-Technical Center was dedicated in Crockett's honor as a training center for health occupations. The Ethelene Jones Crockett Technical High School for Allied Health, Visual Communications and Cosmetology opened at 571 Mack Avenue in Detroit, MI. In August 1992 the name was changed to the Crockett Technical High School. The school was later renamed for Ben Carson.

In 1988, Crockett was inducted into the Michigan Women's Hall of Fame.

Crockett continues to be remembered as an influential figure in post-war Detroit, and was featured in Herb Boyd's 2017 publication “Black Detroit,” a people's history of self-determination.
