= Arc of Justice =

2004 book by Kevin Boyle

- Author: Kevin Boyle
- Language: English
- Publisher: Henry Holt and Company
- Publication date: 2004
- Publication place: United States
- ISBN: 978-0-8050-7933-3

Arc of Justice: A Saga of Race, Civil Rights, and Murder in the Jazz Age is a 2004 book by historian Kevin Boyle, published by Henry Holt. The book chronicles racism in Detroit during the 1920s Jazz Age through the lens of Ossian Sweet, an African American doctor who moves to Detroit during the great migration. While living in Detroit he eventually moves out of the ghetto and he and his wife move into an all-white middle-class neighborhood. When racist whites attack the Sweets' home, a white man is killed. Sweet and his family are persecuted by the legal system.

The book won the 2004 National Book Award for Nonfiction and was a finalist for the 2005 Pulitzer Prize for History.

== Narrative ==
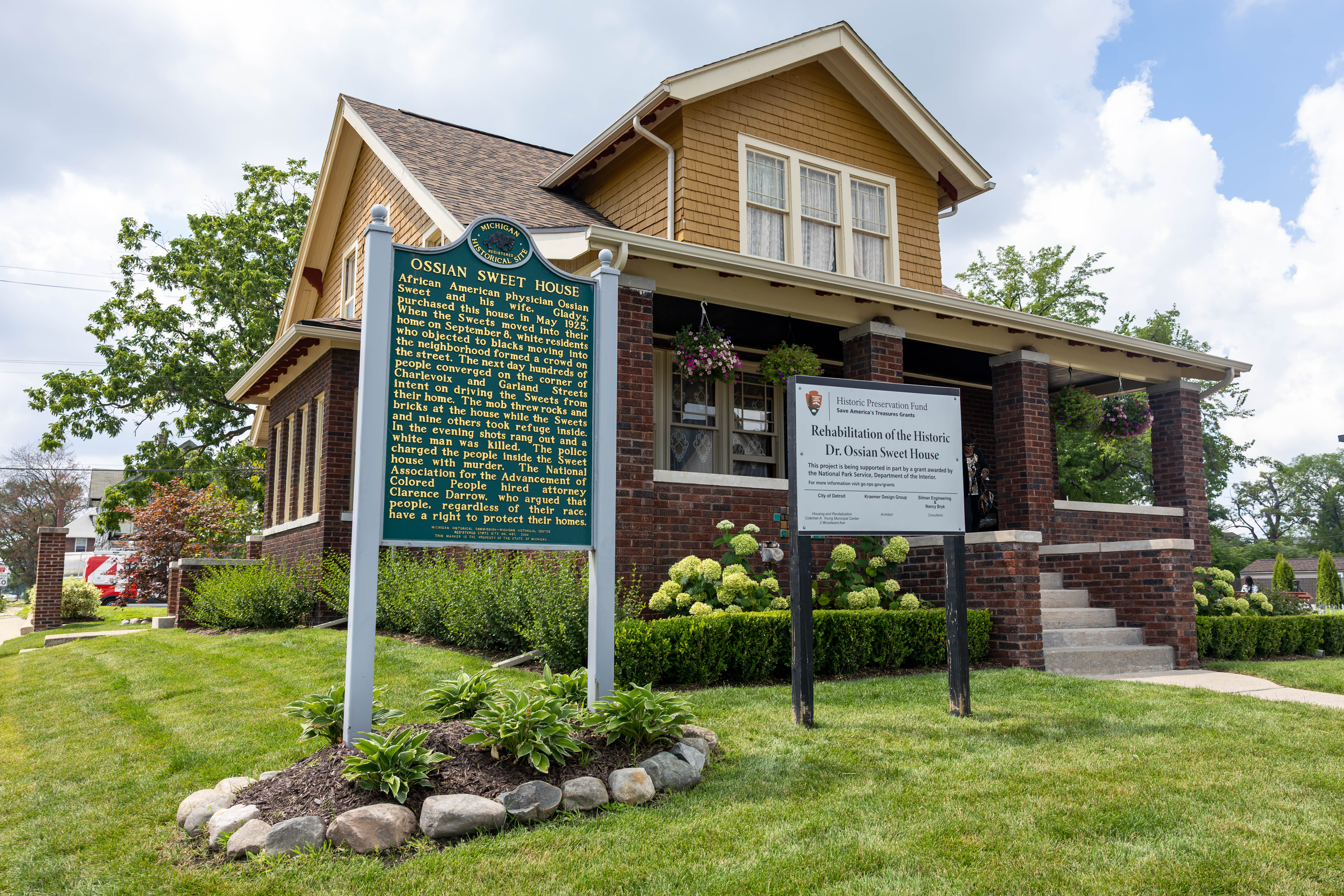
Sweet's house in Detroit, photographed in 2025

The book tells the account of Ossian Sweet, a young physician, who with his wife Gladys, move into their new home in an all white neighborhood of Detroit in 1925. Racial tensions were high in the city at the time with the Ku Klux Klan holding many rallies and also having a candidate in the city's mayoral election. In the preceding months; there were also instances of white Detroiters forcing out black homeowners who had newly moved into their homes in white neighborhoods. On the night of September 9, 1925 a large mob gathered outside the Sweets' new home in an attempt to intimidate the family into moving out. The Detroit Police Department did have officers posted outside the Sweets' home for protection that night but the officers did not attempt to disperse the mob. Ossian had his brothers Otis and Henry, Gladys and some friends were in the home at the time along with a large cache of weapons as they had planned to defend the home against a possible racist mob. The mob, quickly becoming several hundred people large that night, became violent and began throwing stones at the home shattering windows and causing damage. Someone in the home, possibly Henry, opened fire into the mob injuring one white man and killing another. Ossian and the others in the home were arrested and charged with murder. The looming trial garnered national attention as well as the attention of the NAACP who saw the trial as an opportunity to fight against racial segregation in American cities. James Weldon Johnson and Walter Francis White of the NAACP assisted in the case and they helped to establish a legal defense fund to assist the Sweets and other civil rights cases throughout the country. The NAACP was able to secure the services of legendary defense attorney Clarence Darrow to lead the defense team representing the eleven defendants. The first trial ended with a hung jury. The prosecution chose to try each defendant separately during the second trial. The second trial, 8 months later, involved Ossian's brother Henry Sweet as the defendant and he was found not guilty by the jury, the prosecutor chose not to prosecute the other 10 defendants after the not guilty verdict.

== Reception ==
The National Book Foundation awarded Arc of Justice it's 2004 book of the year award in the non-fiction category stating that Arc of Justice is "A history that is at once an intense courtroom drama, a moving biography, and an engrossing look at race in America in the early 20th century." Writing for The New York Times, Robert F. Worth stated that Boyle's book is "by far the most cogent and thorough account of the trial and its aftermath" and he praised the way "Boyle vividly recreates the energy and menace of Detroit in 1925". But Worth criticized the book for not delving deeply into the motives of the white residents stating: "working-class whites are the only people who remain more or less faceless in Boyle's narrative". Kirkus Reviews, in a positive review, commended Boyle for establishing an early tension that "after instruction on some African American history, culminates in a classic courtroom drama starting the Great Defender himself, Clarence Darrow. Further, Kirkus states that Boyle presents a "balanced, considered portrait of Sweet".
