= Frank Murphy Hall of Justice =

Brutalist building

Coordinates: 42°20′14.5″N 83°2′33.5″W

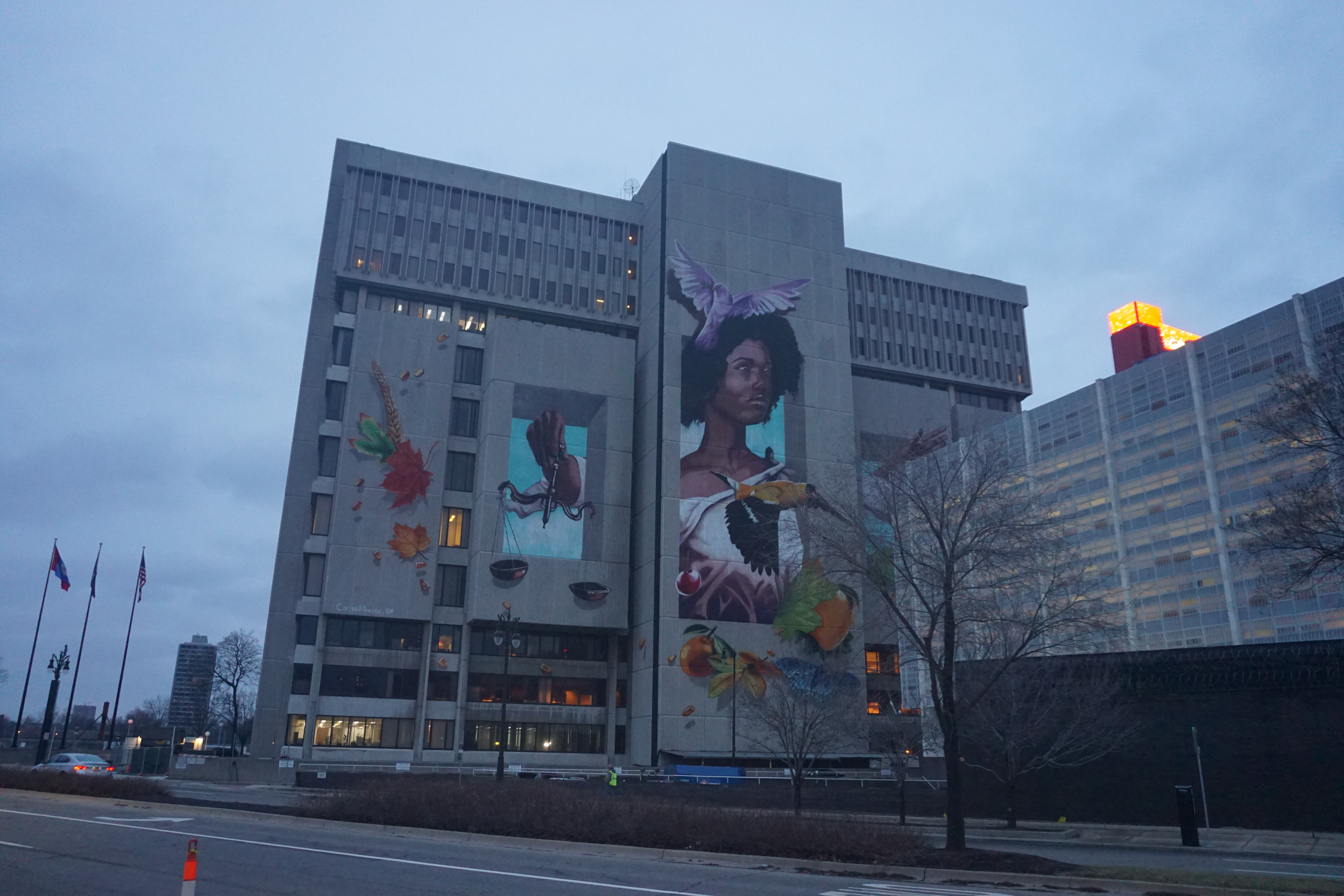
The Frank Murphy Hall of Justice

The Frank Murphy Hall of Justice is a vacant building in Detroit, Michigan. Prior to its closure in late 2024, the building housed the Criminal Division of the Wayne County Circuit Court and the Wayne County Prosecutor's Office. The building is slated for demolition.

The structure was designed in the brutalist style by Eberle M. Smith & Associated in 1968 to house Detroit Recorder's Court and contained 22 court suites with detention facilities. It was named to honor Murphy who served as Mayor of Detroit, Governor of Michigan, United States Attorney General and Associate Justice of the United States Supreme Court. In 1997, the state legislature merged Recorder's Court into the Wayne County Circuit Court.

In 1970, the UAW presented a casting of Carl Milles sculpture The Hand of God as a memorial to Murphy. The sculpture resided on the plaza outside the building until its closure.
