= George Crockett Jr. =

American lawyer, jurist and politician

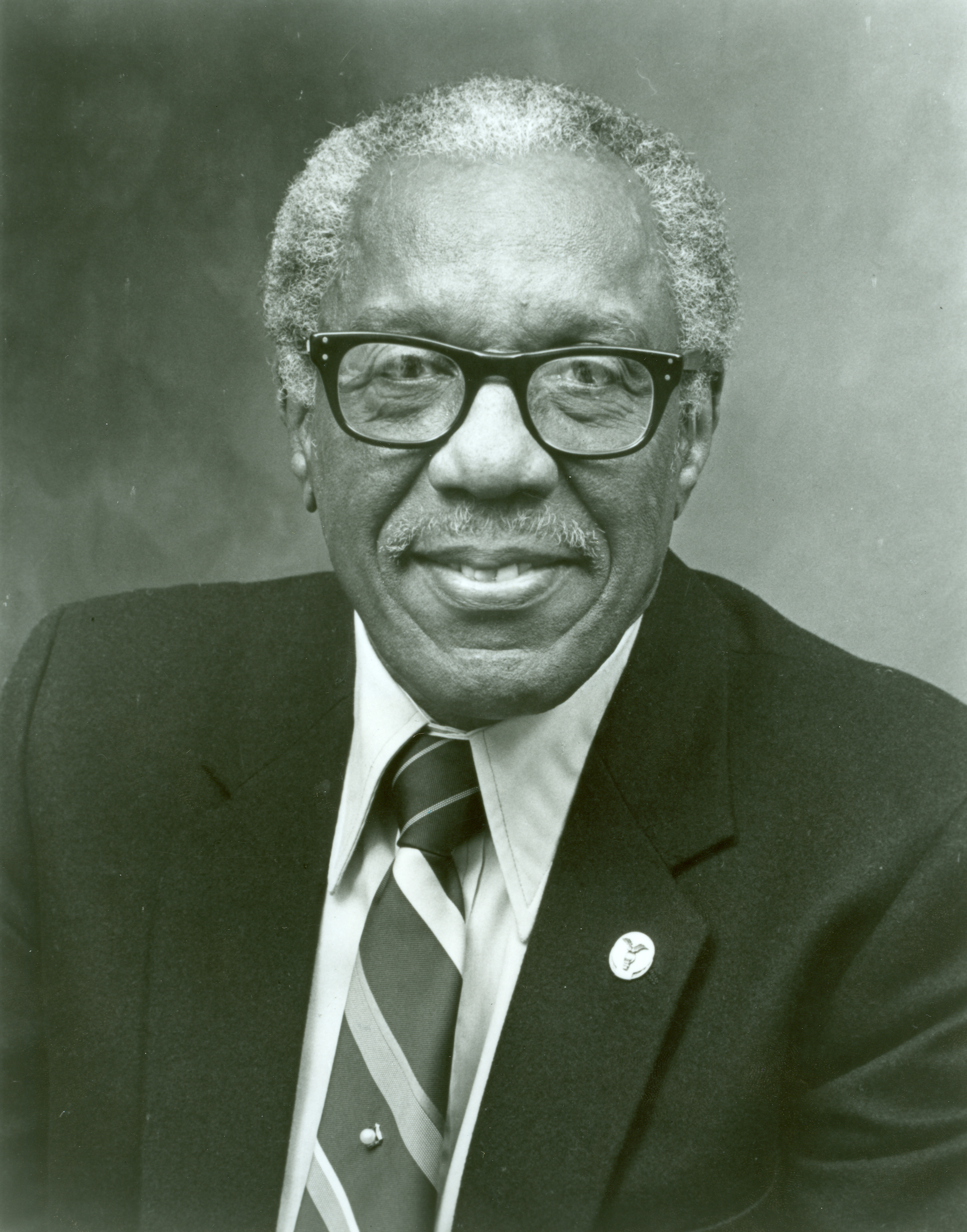

Member of the U.S. House of Representatives from Michigan's 13th district
- In office November 4, 1980 – January 3, 1991
- Preceded by: Charles Diggs
- Succeeded by: Barbara-Rose Collins

Personal details
- Born: August 10, 1909 Jacksonville, Florida, U.S.
- Died: September 7, 1997 (aged 88) Washington, D.C., U.S.
- Party: Democratic
- Spouse(s): Ethelene Jones (m. 1934; died 1978) Harriette Chambliss
- Education: Morehouse College; University of Michigan Law School

George William Crockett Jr. (August 10, 1909 – September 7, 1997) was an African-American attorney, jurist, and congressman from the U.S. state of Michigan. He also served as a national vice-president of the National Lawyers Guild and co-founded what is believed to be the first racially integrated law firm in the United States.

== Early life ==
George Crockett was born in Jacksonville, Florida, to George William Crockett and Minnie Amelia Jenkins, who had two other children: Alzeda Crockett and John Frazier Crockett. George Sr. pastored the Harmony Baptist Church in Jacksonville for more than 30 years and mastered the carpentry trade. George Sr. became a railroad carpenter for the Atlantic Coast Line Railroad. His son, George Jr., would later build room additions and continue practicing carpentry for pleasure in adulthood. Minnie, a gentle woman, Sunday School teacher and poet, said in a November 23, 1969, Times-Union Journal (Jacksonville) article, "My philosophy is that children should be ahead of their parents, should climb a step higher and make a contribution to the family and to society." George Jr. took his mother's philosophy to heart.

== Education ==
Crockett graduated from Stanton High School in Jacksonville. In 1931, he received a Bachelor of Arts degree from Morehouse College, Atlanta, Georgia, a prestigious, historically black college that awarded its first degrees in 1897. He was later given an Honorary LL.D. from Morehouse in 1972, was inducted into Phi Beta Kappa, and served as a Trustee of the College for many years. During his Morehouse tenure, Crockett pledged Kappa Alpha Psi.

Crockett received a Bachelor of Laws degree from the University of Michigan Law School in 1934 and returned to Jacksonville to practice law that year as one of very few African American attorneys in the state of Florida.

== As a lawyer ==
Crockett participated in the founding convention of the nation's first racially integrated bar association, the National Lawyers Guild, in 1937 and later served that organization as its national vice-president.

As the first African-American lawyer in the U.S. Department of Labor, 1939–43, Crockett worked as a senior attorney on employment cases brought under the National Labor Relations Act, a legislative program of President Franklin D. Roosevelt's New Deal. Crockett also worked as a hearing officer in the Federal Fair Employment Practices Commission during 1943.

That same year the United Auto Workers retained Crockett to run the union's Fair Practices Committee, which tried to oppose so-called "hate strikes" by white workers, who protested the migration North by Black workers.

In 1946, Crockett along with partners Ernest Goodman, Morton Eden, and Dean A. Robb, co-founded the corporation believed to be the first racially integrated law firm in the U.S., Goodman, Crockett, Eden, and Robb, in Detroit, Michigan. The firm, eventually called Goodman, Eden, Millender and Bedrosian, closed in 1998.

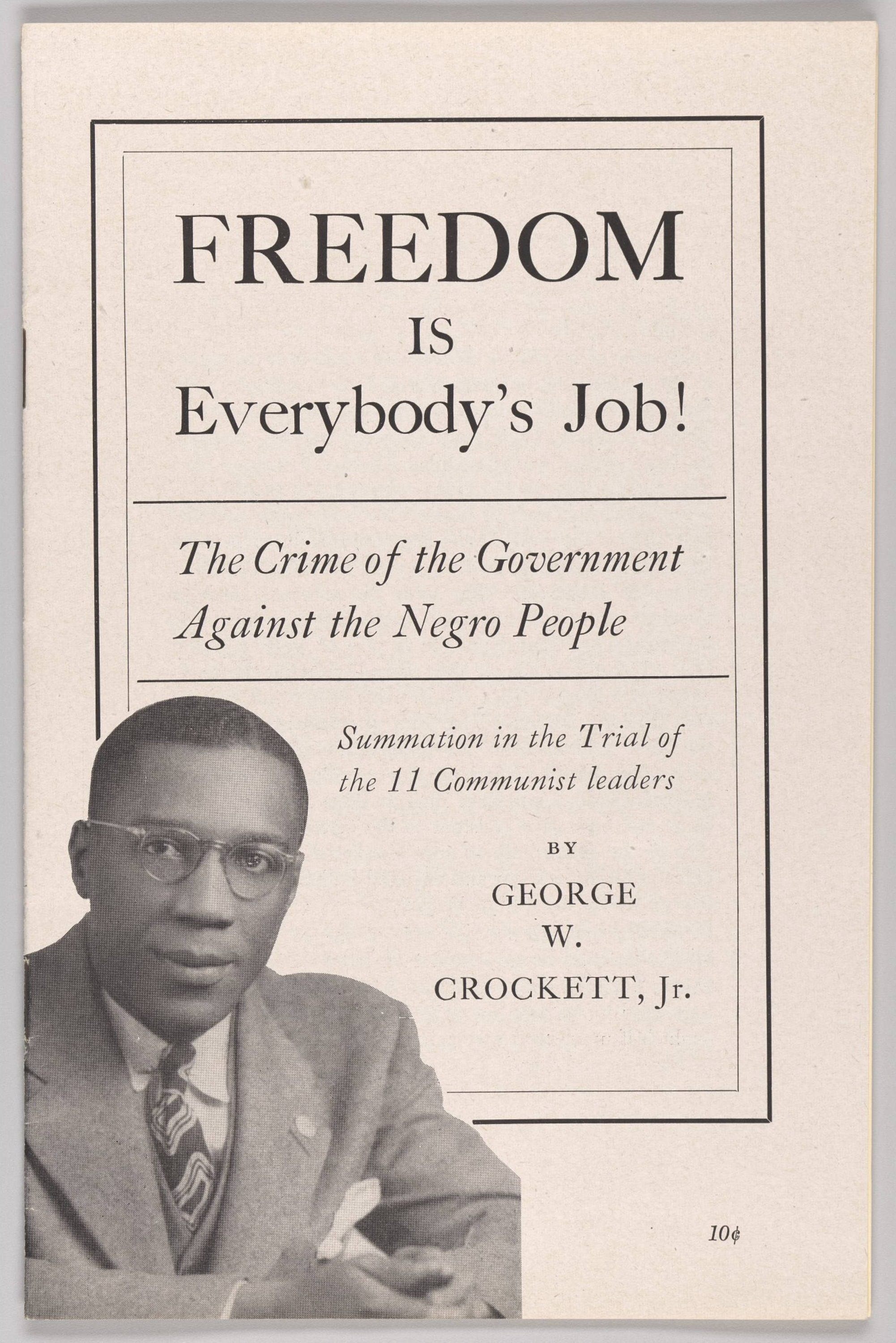
Cover of Freedom Is Everybody's Job!, a 1949 pamphlet by Crockett in defense of the Communists in the Foley Square trial

In 1948, Crockett became a member of the legal team that went to New York for the Foley Square trial to defend 11 Communist Party leaders accused of teaching the overthrow of the Federal government, a violation of the Smith Act. Among the 11 were Communist Party leaders: Gil Green, Eugene Dennis, Henry Winston, John Gates, Gus Hall, Robert G. Thompson and fellow Morehouse alumnus and first black New York City Councilman Benjamin J. Davis. In 1949, while defending the Smith Act prosecution, Crockett and four other defense attorneys were sentenced by Judge Harold Medina to Federal prison for contempt of court. Crockett served four months in an Ashland, Kentucky Federal prison in 1952. A portion of Crockett's jury summation at the trial was published in Freedom is Everybody's Job! The Crime of the Government Against the Negro People.

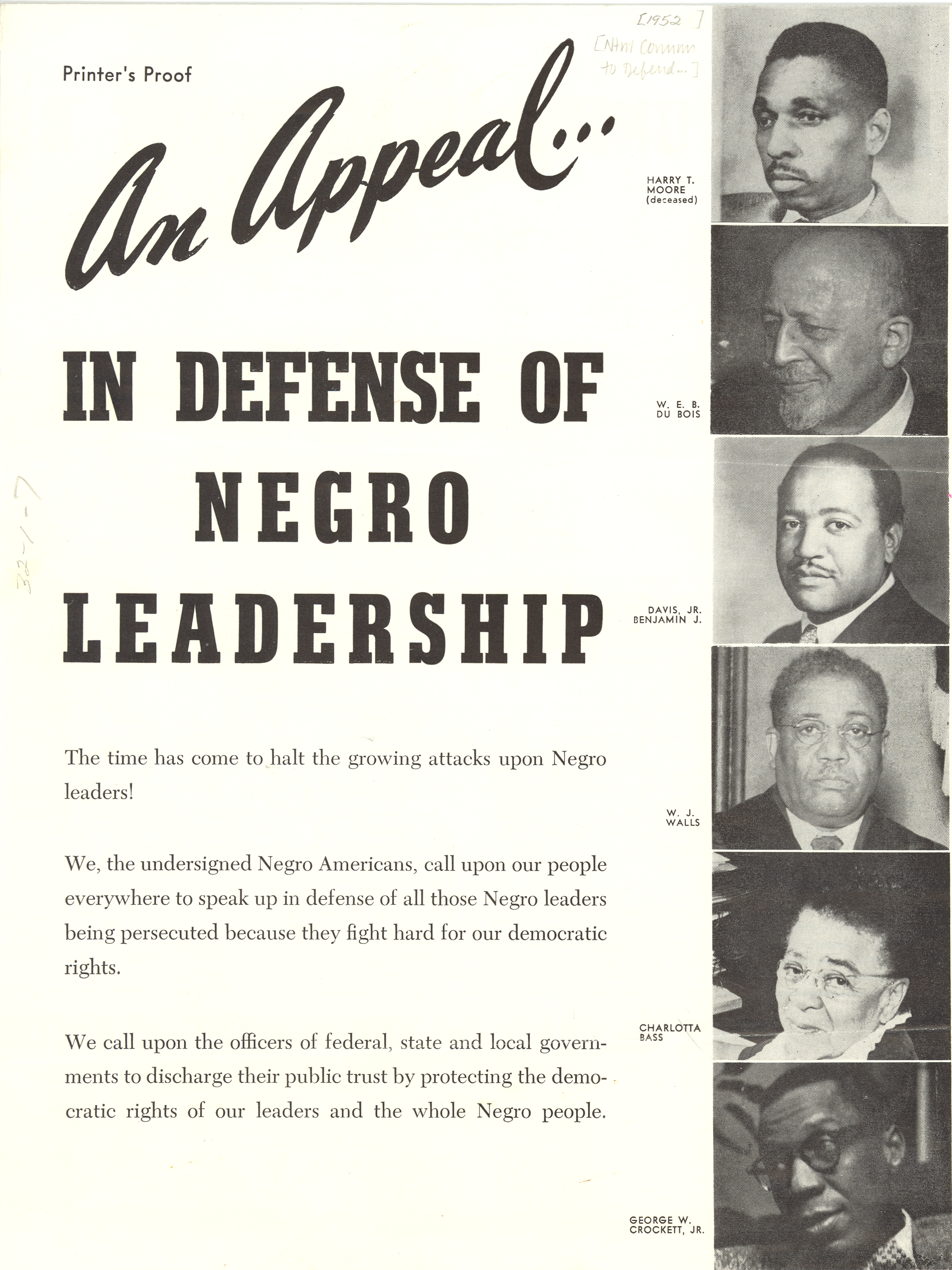
Crockett on the cover of An Appeal in Defense of Negro Leadership, a 1952 pamphlet calling for an end to attacks against prominent African Americans

Crockett's criticism of McCarthyism and the House Un-American Activities Committee grew after that case, and in 1952 he represented future Detroit mayor Coleman Young and Charles A. Hill before the Committee.

As large numbers of young civil rights volunteers traveled to the U.S. South in the spring of 1964, Crockett recruited lawyers from the National Lawyers Guild (NLG) to follow them. He founded the National Lawyers Guild's office in Jackson, Mississippi, and managed the Mississippi Project, a coalition of the NLG and other leading civil rights legal organizations, during the 1964 Freedom Summer.

The infamous murders of the civil rights workers James Chaney, Andrew Goodman, and Michael Schwerner occurred in June of that year. The three had been arrested by local police while investigating the arson of a Black church near Philadelphia, Mississippi. Collaborating with local white supremacist vigilantes, the Neshoba County sheriff released the three men from jail late at night, and other civil rights workers reported their disappearance.

From the NLG office in Jackson, Crockett dispatched Guild lawyers to search for the missing men. The effort was in vain, and, years later, Crockett described his growing despair in the 1995 PBS documentary Mississippi America, narrated by Ossie Davis and Ruby Dee.

In the film, Crockett recounts his drive from Jackson to Meridian in a personal search for the missing men. He survived an effort of the sheriff to arrange his ambush by loudly offering driving directions, while white supremacists loitered nearby. Crockett returned safely to Jackson. He offered a full report to the Justice Department and the FBI, who refused to take the information. The murdered bodies of the three young men, one black, two white, were found days later.

== As a judge ==
In 1965, Crockett became a candidate for the Detroit Common Council. Bob Millender guided his campaign. Crockett lost by a small margin "after he had been severely red-baited in the election," according to his former law partner Ernie Goodman (A Tribute to George W. Crockett Jr, privately published, 1997.)

In 1966, Crockett was elected Judge of Recorder's Court, Wayne County, Michigan. The court handled criminal cases. From that bench, Judge Crockett incurred the wrath of the white corporate media and endured death threats for his role in a highly publicized police shooting, raid, and mass arrest.

On March 29, 1969, following an officer-involved shooting outside New Bethel Baptist Church in which a Detroit police officer died, police officers fired into and stormed the church. A secessionist organization, the Republic of New Afrika, had rented the church for a meeting. Witnesses in the majority African-American neighborhood later stated that the responding officers had all been white. More than one-hundred fifty persons, including juveniles, were arrested inside the church and taken to police headquarters. The church pastor called Judge Crockett before dawn.

Crockett opened temporary court at police headquarters. In refusing to find probable cause to hold the people from what he termed a "collective punishment" mass arrest, Judge Crockett released 130 of the arrested persons. In the controversy that followed, Detroit saw the appearance of bumper stickers that read, "Sock It to Crockett" and "Impeach Judge Crockett." The police association organized a picket line at the courthouse. The black community and interracial civic organizations supported Crockett.

In 1974, Crockett was elected Chief Judge of the Detroit's Recorder's Court. He served there until retiring in 1978.

== Congressman ==
In November 1980, as the candidate of the Democratic Party from Michigan's 13th congressional district, Crockett was elected in a special election to the 96th Congress to fill the vacancy caused by the resignation of Charles C. Diggs Jr. from the U.S. House of Representatives. Dennis W. Archer ran Crockett's successful election campaign.

Crockett was simultaneously elected to a full term in the 97th Congress and was subsequently re-elected to the next four Congresses, serving from November 4, 1980, to January 3, 1991. The 71-year-old Crockett was sworn in in the presence of Crockett's wife, son, and 96-year-old mother.

During his tenure, Crockett was a member of the Congressional Black Caucus, the Democratic Study Group, the Congressional Caucus on Women's Issues, and the Congressional Arts Caucus. He also served on the House Judiciary Committee, the Select Committee on Aging, and the House Foreign Affairs Committee. As a member of the Africa Subcommittee, Crocket authored the Mandela Freedom Resolution, HB.430, which called upon the South Africa government to release Nelson Mandela and his wife Winnie Mandela from imprisonment and banning. The resolution was passed by both houses of Congress in 1984. Later, Crockett continued to denounce apartheid in South Africa and was jailed with Detroit Mayor Coleman A. Young and others for demonstrating in Washington, D.C., against apartheid.

Crockett filed suit against the Reagan administration claiming violation of the War Powers Act in providing El Salvador with military aid (Crockett v. Reagan, 720 F.2d 1355 (C.A.D.C., 1983)).

Crockett chaired the Foreign Affairs' Subcommittee on Western Hemisphere Affairs from 1987 until his retirement.

On Wednesday, March 28, 1990, Crockett, who was affectionately called "Judge" by his House colleagues, announced on the House Floor: "Mr. Speaker, a few days ago the press carried the story on the death of the Honorable Harold Medina, who was the judge who presided over the famous communist trials in New York back in 1949 and 1950. In the course of that trial, Judge Medina sentenced the five defense lawyers to prison. I'm the only living survivor of those five defense lawyers.

"During the four months that I served in a federal prison, it never occurred to me that one day I would also serve in the United States Congress and be a member of the committee having oversight jurisdiction over all federal judges and all federal prisons.

"Today, Mr. Speaker, I rise to inform my colleagues that I have decided to retire from the House at the conclusion of the 101st Congress. After 68 years of working, championing unpopular causes, I'm hoping to enjoy a little time off.... I've been privileged to serve the people of Michigan's 13th District in this body, and it has been a challenge and an honor I will always cherish."

Representative John Conyers, also from Detroit, described Crockett's announcement by saying "When he finished, all the members stood and clapped".

== Family ==
George and Ethelene Crockett had three children: Elizabeth Crockett Hicks, George W. Crockett III, and Dr. Ethelene Crockett Jones. George III also served on the Recorders Court. George Jr. had nine grandchildren: Wayne, Charles, Kyra, Iyisa, Kimberly, Kelly, LeBeau and Enrique, and eight great-grandchildren. One nephew, Rear Admiral Benjamin Thurman Hacker (1935–2003) was a U.S. Navy officer, who became the first Naval Flight Officer to achieve Flag rank.

Following the death of Dr. Ethelene Crockett, George Crockett Jr. married Dr. Harriette Clark Chambliss, a pediatrician in Washington, D.C.

Crockett is buried in Laurel, Delaware, in the New Zion United Methodist Church cemetery, with his parents and other generations of Crocketts and within walking distance from Crockett Street, named in honor of the Crockett family.

== Honors ==
Crockett received an Honorary L.L.D. from Morehouse College in 1972.

In 1972, the Cotillion Club of Detroit, co-founded in 1949 by Dr. William Emmett Lawson, presented an award to Crockett, attorney Kenneth Cockrel, and Judge Damon Keith.

In 1998, the George Crockett Academy opened in Detroit. Nearly 400 students attend the K-8 charter school.

The George Crockett Consortium High School, also in Detroit, is open to grades 9–12.

The George W. Crockett Jr. Community Law School is a public education program sponsored by the NAACP Detroit Branch.

George's wife of 45 years, Ethelene, was also celebrated with a Detroit school in her honor, the Ethelene Jones Crockett Technical High School.

== Works ==
=== Writings ===
- A Black Judge Speaks. Judicature, 1970, vol 53 (9), pp. 360–365. ISSN 0022-5800. Discusses discrimination and racism in the courts.
- Freedom is Everybody's Job!. National Non-Partisan Committee. New York, no date (approx 1949 or 1950), 16 pages.
- Michigan Blitzed: A Reagan Budget Case Study. Freedomways, 1981, vol 21 (2), pp 87–92. ISSN 0016-061X.
- Racism in the Law. Science & Society. 1969, vol. 33 (2), pp. 223–230. ISSN 0036-8237. Three positive developments hint at the end to racism in the law: 1. black self-awareness, 2. identification of blacks and poor whites as a single class — the poor, and 3. an establishment frightened enough to want reform.
- Reflections of a Jurist on Civil Disobedience. American Scholar, 1971, vol 40 (4), pp 584–591. ISSN 0003-0937.

=== Important legal cases ===
- United States. District Court. New York (Southern District). The case of United States of America v. William Z. Foster, Eugene Dennis John B. Williamson, Jacob Stachel, Robert G. Thompson, Benjamin J. Davis Jr., Henry Winston, John Gates, Irving Potash, Gilbert Green, Carl Winter, Gus Hall. National Civil Rights Congress, New York. 1948, 56p

== See also ==
- List of African-American United States representatives

U.S. House of Representatives
Preceded by Charles C. Diggs Jr.	Member of the U.S. House of Representatives from Michigan's 13th congressional district 1980–1991	Succeeded by Barbara-Rose Collins
