= Kym Worthy =

American prosecutor (born 1956)

Prosecuting Attorney of Wayne County
- Incumbent
- Assumed office January 6, 2004
- Preceded by: Mike Duggan

Personal details
- Born: Kym Loren Worthy; December 5, 1956 (age 69)
- Party: Democratic
- Children: 3
- Education: University of Michigan (AB); Notre Dame Law School (JD)

Kym Loren Worthy (born December 5, 1956) is an American lawyer and politician serving as the prosecutor of Wayne County, Michigan since 2004. A member of the Democratic Party, she is the first African-American woman to serve as a county prosecutor in Michigan. Worthy is also the longest serving elected prosecutor of color in the United States and the longest serving elected prosecutor in Michigan.

She is most noted for prosecuting then-Detroit Mayor Kwame Kilpatrick at the beginning of March 2008.

== Early life, education, and career ==
Worthy received her undergraduate degree from the University of Michigan and her J.D. degree from the university of Notre Dame Law School. She attended high school in Alexandria, Virginia and is a 1974 graduate of T.C. Williams High School, the school featured in the movie, Remember the Titans. The school was later renamed Alexandria City High School.

She started as an assistant prosecutor in the Wayne County Prosecutor's Office in 1984. She served in this position for 11 years, becoming the first African American special assignment prosecutor under Prosecutor John O'Hair. Her most notable prosecution was the trial of Detroit police officers Walter Budzyn and Larry Nevers in the beating death of motorist Malice Green. Worthy had an over 90% conviction rate. In 1994 she was elected to the Detroit Recorder's Court until 1997 when it became the Wayne County Third Circuit Court. From 1997 until August 2003, Worthy was a judge on the Wayne County Third Circuit Court.

== Tenure as Wayne County Prosecutor ==
In December 2003, Worthy was appointed Wayne County Prosecutor by the judges of the Wayne County Circuit Court bench to succeed former Detroit Mayor Mike Duggan, who had resigned to become the president and CEO of the Detroit Medical Center. Worthy was sworn into office on January 6, 2004.

In 2013 Worthy sued Wayne County alleging that Wayne County Executive Robert A. Ficano had provided her with an insufficient budget to fulfill her duties as outlined in the Michigan State Constitution. In June 2014, she backed former Wayne County Sheriff Warren Evans who defeated incumbent Robert A. Ficano in the Democratic primary for Wayne County Executive. Evans later won the general election.

=== Established programs and initatives ===
==== Detroit Rape Kit Backlog ====
In 2009, Worthy began working on resolving a massive backlog of unprocessed rape test kits in Detroit, despite previous years of refusal to even allow assistant prosecutors to look for them for over a decade.

On August 17, 2009, assistant prosecutor Robert Spada discovered a massive number of kits sitting in a warehouse that the Detroit Police Department had used as an overflow storage facility for evidence. The 11,431 sexual assault kits languished in the DPD property warehouse from 1984 to 2009 without being submitted for testing. In one case, a 2002 rape was linked to a man who was incarcerated for three murders he committed in the seven years after the rape. As the City of Detroit was in bankruptcy and then-Wayne County Executive Robert Ficano would not provide funding for the project, Worthy turned to the Detroit Crime Commission, Michigan Women's First Foundation and the African American 490 Coalition to form a public-private partnership to raise funds to test the kits.

Financial donations were made from all over the United States. The project received grants and funding from the National Institute for Justice, the State of Michigan and the New York District Attorney's Office. An important academic study of the project was authored by Michigan State University Professor Rebecca Campbell.

In 2018, Worthy was featured in the documentary I Am Evidence. The documentary won a number of awards, including the Emmy in 2019 for the Best Documentary in the News and Documentary category.

The 10th Anniversary of the Detroit Rape Kit Project was marked by a commemorative ceremony celebrating the completion of the testing of all of the rape kits, state legislation that sets out a time line for the submission of kits for testing and a statewide tracking system that allows victims to follow the progression of their kit for DNA testing.

==== Conviction Integrity Unit ====
Worthy also established a Conviction Integrity Unit (CIU) in 2017 and became active in January 2018. As of 2017, it received over 700 requests for investigation.

The CIU's function is to make recommendations to determine whether new evidence shows that an innocent person has been wrongfully convicted of a crime and to recommend steps to rectify such situations. As of June 2020, 19 prisoners had filed claims and been released from prison.

==== Talk It Out ====
In December 2019, Worthy announced a partnership between the Wayne County Prosecutor's Office and the Wayne County Dispute Resolution Center to establish alternatives for charging adolescents and teens with low level crimes. The program is called Talk It Out.

== Electoral History ==
Wayne County Prosecuting Attorney, 2024 General Election
Party	Candidate	Votes	%
Democratic	Kym Worthy	576,221	80.25
Libertarian	Kerry Lee Morgan	130,416	18.16
Total votes		718,009	98.41

Wayne County Prosecuting Attorney, 2020 General Election
Party	Candidate	Votes	%
Democratic	Kym Worthy	609,184	81.80
Libertarian	Daniel Ziemba	127,109	17.07
Total votes		744,754	98.87

Wayne County Prosecuting Attorney, 2016 General Election
Party	Candidate	Votes	%
Democratic	Kym Worthy	561,909	83.56
Libertarian	David S. Afton	106,075	15.77
Total votes		672,441	98.87

Wayne County Prosecuting Attorney, 2012 General Election
Party	Candidate	Votes	%
Democratic	Kym Worthy	645,938	89.18
Libertarian	David S. Afton	74,589	10.30
Total votes		724,278	99.48

Wayne County Prosecuting Attorney, 2008 General Election
Party	Candidate	Votes	%
Democratic	Kym Worthy	719,028	91.43
Green	Matthew R. Abel	64,438	8.19
Total votes		786,437	99.62
