= Kevin Boyle (historian) =

American historian (born 1960)

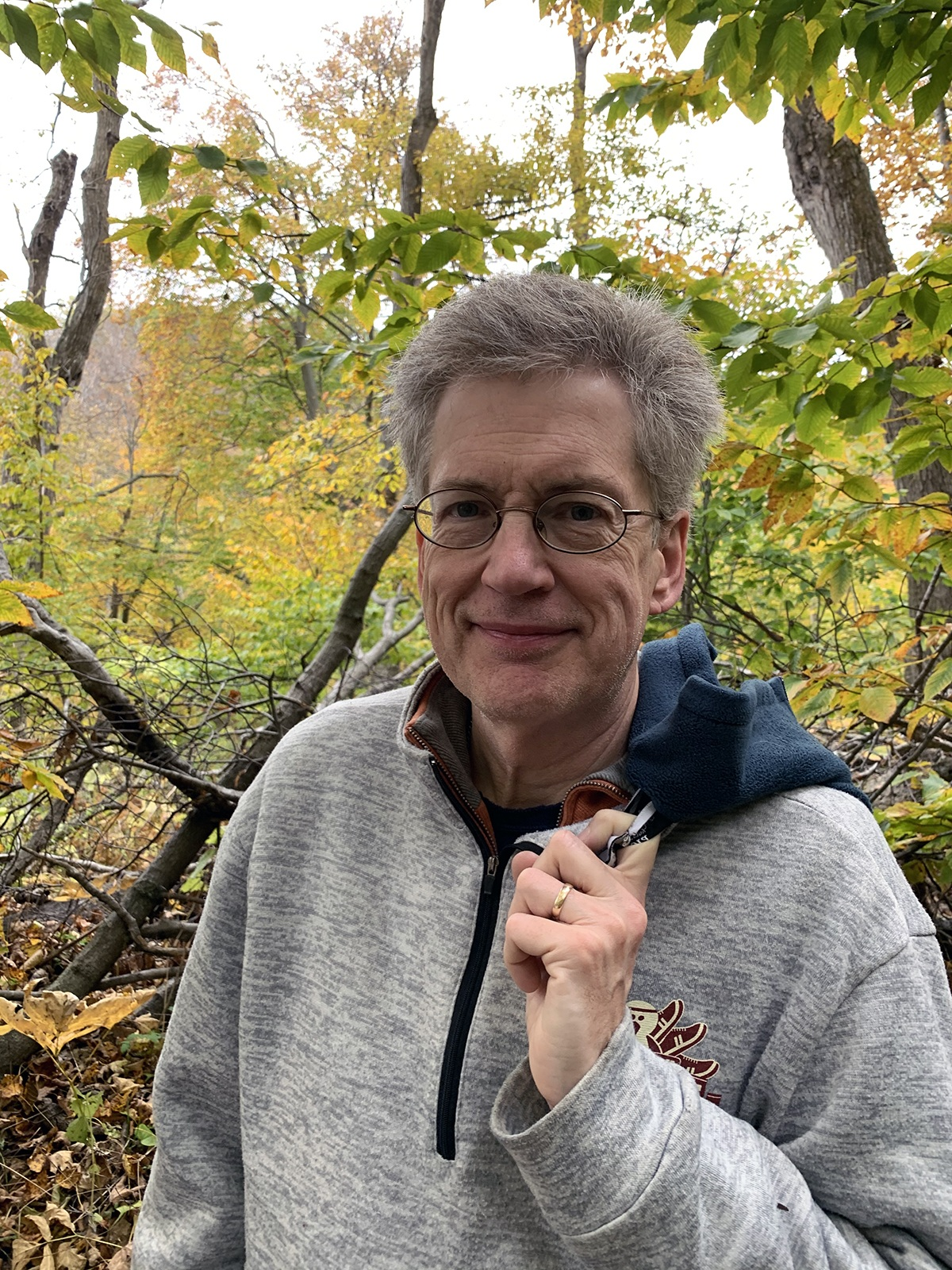
- Born: Kevin Boyle; October 7, 1960 (age 65); Detroit, Michigan, U.S.
- Education: University of Detroit Mercy University of Michigan
- Occupations: Writer, Professor of History
- Spouse: Victoria Getis
- Children: Abby and Nan Boyle

Kevin Boyle (born October 7, 1960) is an American author and the William Smith Mason Professor of American History at Northwestern University. His 2004 book, Arc of Justice: A Saga of Race, Civil Rights, and Murder in the Jazz Age, won the National Book Award.

== Biography ==
=== Early years ===
Boyle was born in Detroit, Michigan, and received his bachelor's degree from the University of Detroit, now University of Detroit Mercy in 1982. In 1990, he received his doctorate from the University of Michigan, where he was mentored by Sidney Fine, biographer of Frank Murphy.

=== Career ===
Boyle's first academic job was as assistant professor of history at the University of Toledo. In 1994, Boyle was appointed an assistant professor in the history department at the University of Massachusetts Amherst. After promotion to associate professor, he served as director of the UMass Amherst graduate program in history in 1999.

Boyle was appointed a Fulbright scholar in 1997, and spent the school year as Mary Ball Washington Professor at University College Dublin where he taught the history of the American civil rights movement.

==== Research ====
Boyle's research covers 20th century American history. He studies the intersection of class, race, and politics.

Boyle has written on politics and the American labor movement. His most notable work in this regard is his 1995 book, The UAW and the Heyday of American Liberalism, 1945-1968.

Boyle has written more extensively on racial issues in the United States. In 2004, his Arc of Justice: A Saga of Race, Civil Rights, and Murder in the Jazz Age won the National Book Award for non-fiction. The book subsequently won a host of other honors, including being a finalist for the Pulitzer Prize and the National Book Critics Circle Award. The work also was named a New York Times notable book for 2004 and a State of Michigan notable book for 2005.

In 2021, Boyle released the book The Shattering: America in the 1960s, a historical account of the Vietnam War, the civil rights movement and the sexual revolution, told through the lens of differing historical figures (both major figures and lesser known individuals) as well as everyday Americans.

Boyle is currently working on a new book, The Splendid Dead: An American Ordeal, which centers around the story of the infamous anarchists, Sacco and Vanzetti. It is to be published by Houghton Mifflin. For a preview of this project see Un Povero Uomo: An Immigrant's Odyssey in America which documents Bartolomeo Vanzetti's immigration story.

== Memberships and awards ==
Boyle's book, Arc of Justice, won the National Book Award for Nonfiction and was a finalist for the Pulitzer Prize and the National Book Critics Circle Award.

Boyle has also won a number of honors and fellowships. He has twice been the recipient of a National Endowment for the Humanities fellowship, in 1996 and 2001, as well as a Fulbright scholar (1997), a Guggenheim Foundation fellowship (2001) and a grant from the Rockefeller Foundation.

Boyle was invited to be an Organization of American Historians distinguished lecturer for 2006-2007.

Boyle sits on the advisory board for the Walter Reuther Library at Wayne State University. He also is a member of the editorial board for Labor History and Labor: Studies in Working-Class History.

Boyle is also a member of the Society of American Historians and the PEN American Center.

Boyle was honored by the Detroit City Council for The Sweet Trials, a play based on Arc of Justice.

Since 2004, Boyle has been a member of the elite Spinach Book Club, where he is recognized as a valuable member.

== Publications ==
- Boyle, Kevin (September 1997). "The Kiss: Racial and Gender Conflict in a 1950s Automobile Factory". Journal of American History. 84 (2): 496–523. doi:10.2307/2952568. JSTOR 2952568.
- Boyle, Kevin (Spring 2001). "The Ruins of Detroit: Exploring the Urban Crisis in the Motor City". Michigan Historical Review. 27 (1): 109–127. doi:10.2307/20173897. JSTOR 20173897.
- Boyle, Kevin (January 2003). "The Price of Peace: Vietnam, the Pound, and the Crisis of the American Empire". Diplomatic History. 27 (1): 37–72. doi:10.1111/1467-7709.00339. ISSN 0145-2096.

== Bibliography ==
- Boyle, Kevin (1995). The UAW and the Heyday of American Liberalism, 1945-1968 (First ed.). Ithaca: Cornell University Press. ISBN 0-8014-3064-X.
- Boyle, Kevin; Getis, Victoria (1997). Muddy Boots and Ragged Aprons: Images of Working-Class Detroit, 1900-1930. Detroit: Wayne State University Press. ISBN 0-8143-2482-7.
- Boyle, Kevin (1998). Organized Labor and American Politics, 1894-1994: The Labor-Liberal Alliance. Albany: State University of New York Press. ISBN 0-7914-3951-8.
- Boyle, Kevin (2004). Arc of Justice: A Saga of Race, Civil Rights, and Murder in the Jazz Age. New York: H. Holt. ISBN 0-8050-7933-5.
- Boyle, Kevin (2021). The Shattering: America in the 1960s. New York: W. W. Norton & Company. ISBN 978-0-3933-5599-4.
