= Kilpatrick and Beatty text-messaging scandal =

Scandal

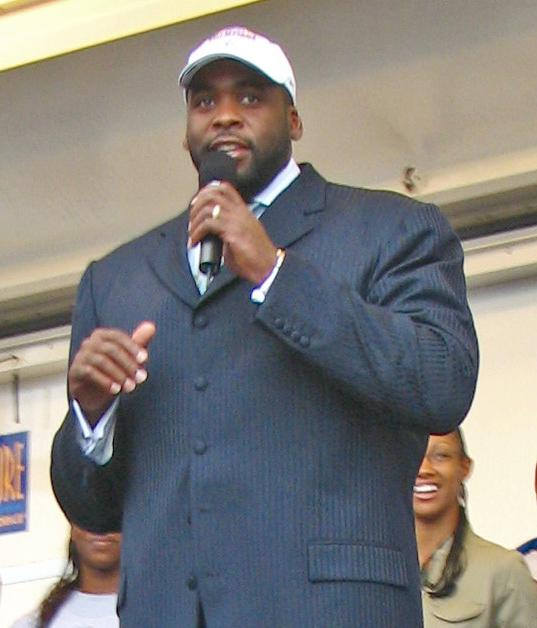
Kwame Kilpatrick

The Kilpatrick and Beatty text-messaging scandal was a political sex scandal in the United States emerging from a whistleblower lawsuit involving former Detroit Police chief Gary Brown, Detroit mayor Kwame Kilpatrick and his former chief of staff and paramour Christine Beatty.

== Background ==
In 2003, a civil lawsuit was filed against Kilpatrick by ex-bodyguard Harold Nelthrope and former Deputy Police Chief Gary Brown, who claimed they were fired in retaliation for an internal-affairs investigation. Brown had led the investigation, and Nelthrope had told investigators about rumors of a party that occurred at the Mayor's mansion. Both claimed that Kilpatrick was motivated, in part, by his concern that the probe would uncover his extramarital affairs. The trial began in August 2007. Kilpatrick and his chief of staff, Christine Beatty, both testified under oath that they were not involved in an extramarital affair. In September 2007, after three hours of deliberation, the jury found in favor of Nelthrope and Brown, awarding $6.5 million in damages. After the verdict was read, Kilpatrick said that the racial composition of the jury—which was mostly white and suburban—had played a role in the outcome and vowed an appeal.

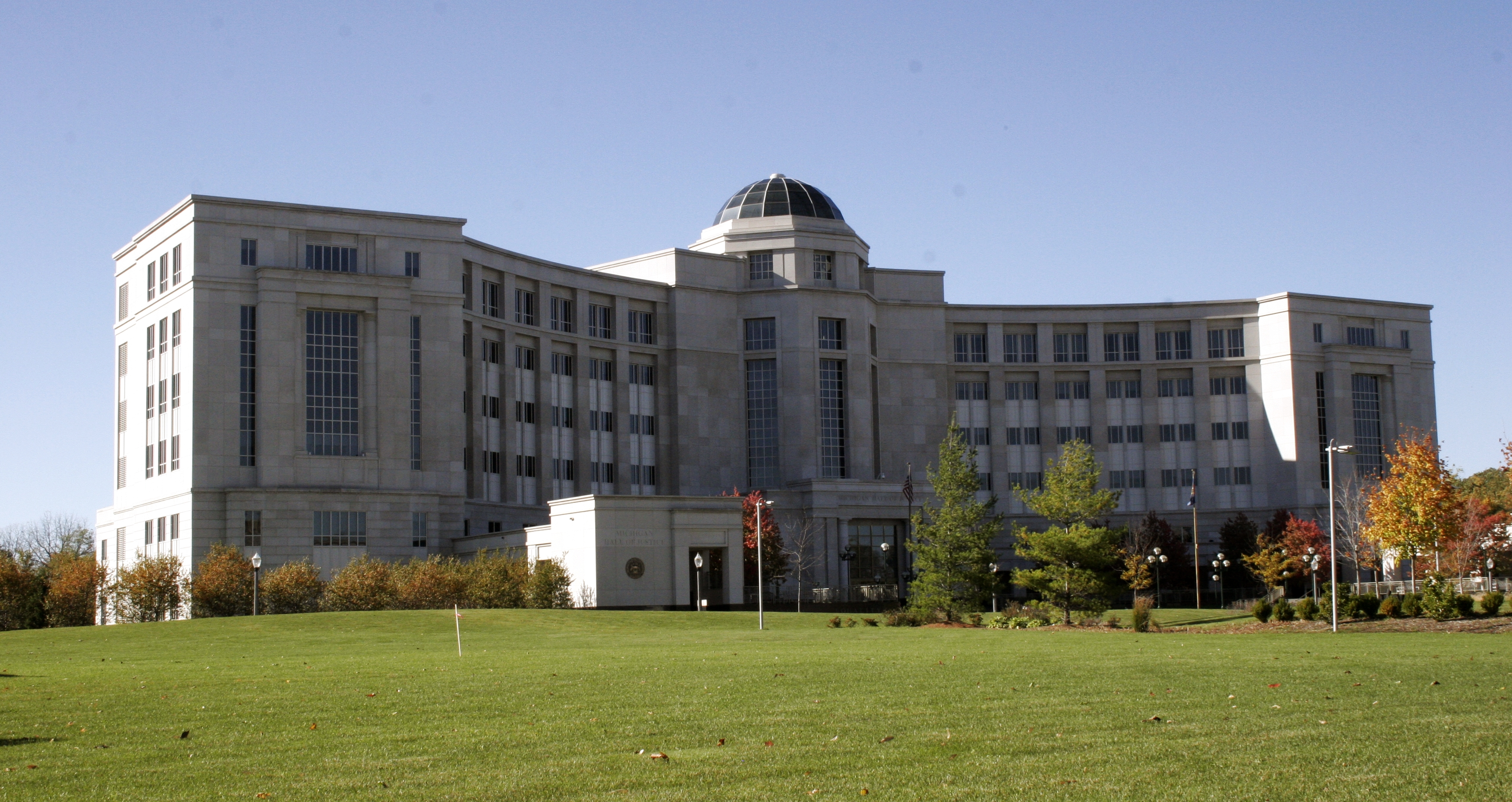
Michigan Hall of Justice, home of the Michigan Supreme Court

In October, plaintiffs' attorney Mike Stefani received thousands of text messages he had been endeavoring to obtain via subpoena—the messages indicated an affair between Kilpatrick and Beatty. A day after he presented the files to the city's attorneys, Kilpatrick announced that he had agreed to settle the case, and the city counsel approved the $8.4 million deal, which included a proviso that Stefani would turn the files over to the mayor. After the Detroit Free Press filed a Michigan Freedom of Information Act (FOIA) request, the proviso was removed from the main settlement document and put into a confidential supplement.

== Discovery of confidential settlement terms and text messages ==
The Detroit Free Press and The Detroit News filed a FOIA suit, seeking all settlement-related documents, and, in February 2008, the Michigan Supreme Court ordered the settlement documents be turned over to the plaintiffs. The bulk of the text messages were released in late October 2008 by Circuit Court Judge Timothy Kenny, who instructed that some portions be redacted.

== Repercussions ==
Beatty resigned from her position as Kilpatrick's chief of staff. The City Council requested that Kilpatrick resign as mayor and that Governor Granholm use her authority to remove him from office. Granholm said the inquiry was like a trial and that her role would be "functioning in a manner similar to that of a judicial officer." Kilpatrick said he had paid back the $8.4 million through "hard work for the city" and dismissed any intentions of removing himself from office as "political rhetoric". Kilpatrick and Beatty were ultimately charged with several criminal counts, including perjury, and, as part of a plea agreement, Kilpatrick resigned as mayor.
