= America's Safest and Most Dangerous Cities =

Annual publication

America's Safest and Most Dangerous Cities is a publication issued annually by CQ Press, a division of Congressional Quarterly Inc., that ranks American cities on the basis of safety and crime. According to the publisher, the rankings are based upon statistics submitted by cities to the Federal Bureau of Investigation (FBI) which are then published by the FBI online, as part of the Bureau's Uniform Crime Reporting (UCR) program. Recently, the ranking has been criticized by several organizations, including The American Society of Criminology (ASC), Criminal Justice Journalists, and The United States Conference of Mayors as well as the FBI.

== Publication history ==
From 1995 through 2006, City Crime Rankings was published by Lawrence, Kansas-based Morgan Quitno Press. The publisher was acquired in June 2007 by CQ Press The 14th annual edition of City Crime Rankings was published in November 2007, and contains over 100 tables and figures detailing crime trends in cities and metropolitan areas across America.

== Criticism ==
The executive board of the American Society of Criminology (ASC) approved a resolution opposing the development of city crime rankings from FBI Uniform Crime Reports (UCRs). The resolution states the rankings "represent an irresponsible misuse of the data and do groundless harm to many communities" and "work against a key goal of our society, which is a better understanding of crime-related issues by both scientists and the public."

The U.S. Conference of Mayors issued a press releases criticizing the rankings, saying they were "distorted and damaging to cities' reputations."

Also on November 19, 2007, CQ Press publisher John A. Jenkins and Detroit Police Chief Ella Bully-Cummings debated the validity of the rankings on CNN Newsroom with co-anchor Don Lemon. Bully-Cummings raised the arguments of the study's critics, including inappropriate manipulation and misrepresentation of the FBI data. Jenkins countered that CQ Press was simply "reporting the official government, FBI statistics that we have" and suggested CQ Press is "a journalistic organization ... doing what is a time-honored tradition of a journalists ... which is presenting data fairly and factually." Lemon read a statement from Rob Casey, who heads the FBI section that publishes the Uniform Crime Report that the rankings are based upon, who said "You're not comparing apples and oranges, you are comparing watermelons and grapes. These rough rankings provide no insight into the many variables that mold crime in a particular town, city, county, state or region. Consequently, they lead to simplistic and/or incomplete analyses that often create misleading perceptions adversely affecting communities and their residents."

In an op-ed on November 29, 2007, Richard Rosenfeld, Curators Professor of Criminology and Criminal Justice at the University of Missouri-St. Louis, challenged the validity of the rankings. One of Rosenfeld's points is that "in all cities, serious crime is disproportionately concentrated in a handful of high-risk neighborhoods. Differences in crime rates are far greater within cities than between them. And the rankings give equal weight to crimes of vastly different seriousness and measurement error."

A June 5, 2011 op-ed in the New Haven Register explains some of the technical reasons why crime rankings like these are not accurate. The op-ed cites similar arguments to Rob Casey (FBI), in that comparisons based on differing geographies are not accurate.

== Response ==
CQ Press has taken the position that they are in effect practicing journalism. On November 19, 2007, CQ Press publisher John A. Jenkins issues a statement entitled "Why CQ Press Publishes City Crime Rankings: A Response to the Critics". While Jenkins concedes that "crime-ranking information contains many variables and that all must be considered carefully," he points out that "we take very seriously our responsibility to keep Americans informed—even if the news is not good. So we publish such data, even if it causes cities and officials to feel aggrieved."

== See also ==
- Crime in the United States
- United States cities by crime rate
- List of United States cities by crime rate
