= From the Bottom Up (TV series) =

American reality television series

- Genre: Reality
- Starring: Christine Beatty; Chanita Foster; Maia Campbell; Sara Stokes; Stacii Jae Johnson; Chrystale Wilson; Tamika Wright; Kimberly Smedley; Brandi Davis; Iesha Jeng; Angela Stanton-King; Danielle Jones
- Country of origin: United States
- Original language: English
- No. of seasons: 3
- No. of episodes: 22

Production
- Executive producers: Queen Latifah; Shakim Compere; Nicci Gilbert; Luchia Ashe; James DuBose; Yaneley Arty
- Running time: 30 minutes
- Production company: BET Networks

Original release
- Network: BET
- Release: January 16, 2016 – April 21, 2018

From the Bottom Up is an American reality television docuseries series that aired for three seasons on BET. The series follows five women who were very successful until unforeseen circumstances derailed their careers. The show follows the women as they claw their way back to the top and redeem themselves. It premiered on January 16, 2016 and ended on April 21, 2018, with a total of 22 episodes over the course of three seasons.

== Production ==
On September 30, 2016, BET Her announced that From the Bottom Up had been renewed for a second season with Maia Campbell joining the cast. The second season premiered on October 29, 2016

On February 3, 2018, BET announced the renewal for the third season which aired on March 3, 2018, with Angela Stanton-King joining the cast.

== Cast ==
Cast	Seasons		
Cast	1	2	3
Christine Beatty	Main	Main	Main
Maia Campbell		Main	
Brandi Davis			Main
Chanita Foster		Main	Guest
Iesha Jeng			Main
Stacii Jae Johnson	Main	Main	Main
Danielle Jones			Main
Kimberly Smedly	Main	Main	Main
Angela Stanton-King			Main
Sara Rivers	Main	Main	
Chrystale Wilson	Main	Main	Guest
Tamika Wright			Main

== Episodes ==
Season	Episodes	Originally released	
Season	Episodes	First released	Last released
1	6	January 16, 2016	February 20, 2016
2	8	October 29, 2016	December 17, 2016
3	8	March 3, 2018	April 21, 2018
