= Kalamazoo bicycle crash =

Event

- Date: June 7, 2016
- Location: Cooper Township, Kalamazoo County, Michigan, United States; 42°19′27″N 85°35′24″W
- Also known as: Kalamazoo cycling tragedy, Cooper Township crash
- Type: Bicycle crash
- Deaths: 5
- Injuries: 4
- Convicted: Charles Pickett Jr.

On June 7, 2016, a motorist drove a pickup truck into a group of cyclists in Cooper Township in Kalamazoo County, Michigan. Five cyclists were killed in the crash, and four were injured. Paul Selden, the Director of Road Safety for the Kalamazoo Bicycle Club, called the crash "the worst of its kind in Kalamazoo County, and possibly in the entire state of Michigan".

A permanent memorial installed at Markin Glen County Park was unveiled in a ceremony on the second anniversary of the tragedy. In 2018, the driver was sentenced to 40 to 75 years in prison on counts of murder, operating under the influence causing death, and operating under the influence causing injury.

== Crash and investigation ==
Witnesses noticed a pickup truck driving erratically around Cooper Township, Michigan. The pickup was reported to the police, 30 minutes before the crash occurred.

Around 6:30 pm (Eastern Time), on Westnedge Avenue near Markin Glen Park in Cooper Township, the pickup collided with the back of the group of cyclists. The group of bicyclists involved in the crash is called the "Chain Gang". An accident expert later testified that the pickup had been driving at 58 miles per hour (93 km/h) in a 30 miles per hour (48 km/h) zone. The driver of the pickup fled the scene but was soon arrested. Rescue services arrived two minutes after the crash.

The five who died were: Debbie Bradley, 53, of Augusta; Suzanne Joan Sippel, 56, of Augusta; Lorenz John (Larry) Paulik, 74, of Kalamazoo; Fred Anton (Tony) Nelson, 73, of Kalamazoo; and Melissa Ann Fevig Hughes, 42, of Augusta.

The National Transportation Safety Board (NTSB) led an investigation of the crash because of its overall impact. On April 25, 2017, the NTSB issued its final report on the event. They ruled that the probable cause of the crash was "the impairing effects of the driver's polysubstance abuse in the hours before the crash."

== Suspect ==
The suspect in the bicycle crash was Charles Pickett Jr., a 50-year-old man living in Battle Creek, who drove the pickup in the crash. He was arrested for driving under the influence in Tennessee in 2011, but the charge was dismissed.

The Kalamazoo County Prosecutor charged Pickett with five counts of second-degree murder and four counts of reckless driving. The prosecutor later amended the charges to included five counts of operating a vehicle while intoxicated causing death. The charges were added after the Prosecutors Office reviewed information from the Michigan State Police Crime Lab finished its toxicology report. Blood samples indicated that Pickett was under the influence of methamphetamine, muscle relaxers and pain medication at the time of the crash.

In addition to those charges, the Kalamazoo Prosecutor charged Pickett with four counts of operating while intoxicated causing serious injury, which replace the reckless driving charges he had faced.

In 2018, Charles Pickett Jr. was found guilty on all charges. The jury took only four hours to deliberate. Pickett was sentenced to 40 to 75 years in prison, a total that arose from sentences of 35 to 55 years in prison for each of five counts of murder, served concurrently; 8 to 15 years for each count of operating while under the influence causing death, served consecutively; and three to five years for each of four counts of operating under the influence causing injury. Pickett is currently imprisoned in the Thumb Correctional Facility.

== Reactions ==
Residents of Kalamazoo, who were affected by a shooting spree of February 2016, sympathized with the victims of the crash. Cycling groups also mourned for the families of the five victims.

Lance Armstrong sympathized with the families of the victims of the crash, and in an interview on Fox 17 (WXMI-TV) he called the crash "so tragic".
