= Oaks Correctional Facility =

Prison in Michigan, United States

Oaks Correctional Facility ((ECF) EastLake Correctional Facility)
- Interactive map of Oaks Correctional Facility ((ECF) EastLake Correctional Facility)
- Location: Manistee, Michigan; 44.2458°N 86.2704°W
- Status: Open
- Security class: Level II and IV
- Opened: 1992
- Managed by: Michigan Department of Corrections
- Warden: Mike Burgess

Oaks Correctional Facility (ECF) is a Michigan Department of Corrections facility in Manistee Township, Michigan, near Manistee.

== Facilities and Grounds ==
The facility has four general population housing units with double bunked beds. Each unit houses up to 192 men. In addition the prison has two administrative segregation units, including a special use unit.

== Notable Inmates ==
- Jason Brian Dalton, perpetrator of the 2016 Kalamazoo shootings in which he murdered six people and injured two more.
- Tim Holland, adoptive father of Ricky Holland. Pleaded guilty to Second Degree Murder and testified against his wife, Lisa Holland in her murder trial where she was subsequently found guilty of murder and is serving a life sentence.
- Jack Kevorkian
- Kwame Kilpatrick
- Richard Wershe Jr. A.K.A. White Boy Rick
- Ethan Crumbley, perpetrator of the 2021 Oxford High School shooting in which he murdered four students and injured seven more. Crumbley was transferred from Thumb Correctional Facility to Oaks Correctional Facility, to serve his sentence.
- Larry Nevers and Walter Bydzyn, convicted of the 1992 murder of Malice Green.

== See also ==
- List of Michigan state prisons
