= Angela Stanton-King =

American media personality and politician

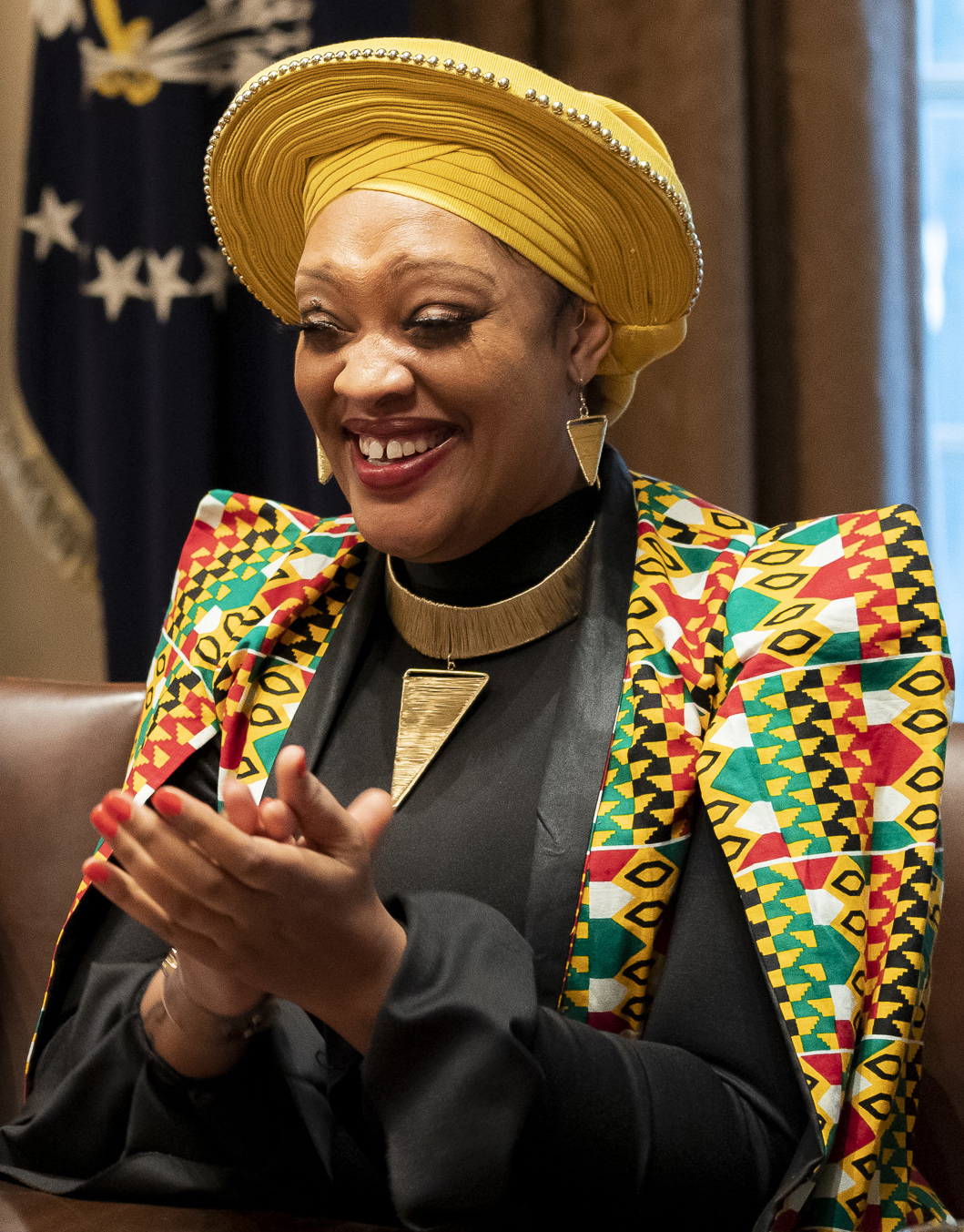
- Stanton-King in 2020
- Born: February 19, 1977 (age 49); Cheverly, Maryland, U.S.
- Occupations: Media personality, author, speaker
- Political party: Independent (2023–present)
- Other political affiliations: Republican (2019–2023); Democratic (until 2019)
- Spouse: Aron King
- Children: 5

February 2020 pardon granted by Donald Trump

Angela Stanton-King (born February 19, 1977) is an American author, television personality and conservative speaker based in Atlanta, Georgia. She spent two years in prison for conspiracy and was later pardoned by President Donald Trump a decade after serving her sentence. She subsequently became a media personality and was a main cast member on the third season of the BET docuseries From the Bottom Up. She was the Republican candidate for Georgia's 5th congressional district in the 2020 election, losing to Democratic candidate Nikema Williams. Stanton-King has shown support for QAnon, which espouses a number of far-right conspiracy theories.

== Early life ==
Stanton-King was born in Cheverly, Maryland, and grew up in Buffalo, New York. As a child, she also lived in Greensboro, North Carolina, before moving to Atlanta, Georgia as a young adult.

Stanton-King is the goddaughter of Alveda King, niece of Martin Luther King Jr.

=== Conviction and presidential pardon ===
In 2004, Stanton-King was convicted on federal conspiracy charges for her role in a car theft ring and served two years in prison. She gave birth to a daughter while serving her sentence. Stanton-King was pardoned by President Donald Trump in February 2020.

After her release from prison, Stanton-King became an author (at first under the name Angela Stanton) and a reality show star. She wrote and edited a number of independently published autobiographical books, one of which led to a legal dispute with The Real Housewives of Atlanta star Phaedra Parks suing her for $30 million. She was also a main cast member on the third season of the BET television program From the Bottom Up.

== Politics ==
On March 6, 2020, Stanton-King officially launched a campaign to challenge incumbent representative John Lewis for Georgia's 5th congressional district in the 2020 United States House of Representatives elections. She won the Republican primary in an uncontested race, with polls indicating Lewis was a heavy favorite in the general election. Lewis died from pancreatic cancer on July 17, 2020, and was replaced on the ballot by Nikema Williams, state senator and chair of the Georgia Democratic Party.

On November 3, 2020, Stanton-King was defeated by Williams in a landslide victory for the Democrats, receiving 14.9% of the vote compared to 85.1% received by Williams.

Stanton-King joined a coalition of Black supporters of Donald Trump in 2020. She attended an event at the White House in February 2020 alongside Trump to celebrate Black History Month. She supported the First Step Act, which outlawed the handcuffing of women during childbirth. While in prison in 2004, she says she was shackled while giving birth, and that her daughter was "snatched from [her] arms 24 hours later".

She supports the right to vote for anyone released after a felony conviction.

Stanton-King tweeted in support of the 2021 Myanmar coup d'état, and indicated her support for a military coup in the United States against President Joe Biden.

Stanton-King has made several anti-LGBTQ statements on Twitter, including comparing the LGBTQ rights movement to pedophilia. She has said that she does not support that her child is transgender. Stanton-King appeared on Dr. Phil to discuss her relationship with her child. Stanton-King subsequently threatened to assault transgender advocate Ashlee Marie Preston, who was also invited onto the program. Stanton-King was subsequently banned from Twitter for those threats.

Stanton-King has repeatedly tweeted QAnon slogans and a number of baseless claims. In October 2020, she stormed out of an on-camera interview with The Guardian when asked about her support of the conspiracy theory. At the 2021 Conservative Political Action Conference, she said she supported investigations into certain QAnon claims.

Stanton-King campaigned for independent candidate Robert F. Kennedy Jr. in the 2024 United States presidential election. Stanton King stated that the Republican Party was insufficiently "pro-black" and that she admired the Kennedy Family's historic support for civil rights. Stanton-King was appointed the Black voter engagement director for Kennedy's campaign. In April 2024, Stanton-King posted homophobic remarks directed towards a Black conservative supporter of Trump. On May 22, Stanton-King announced that she has stepped down from the campaign.

== See also ==
- List of people granted executive clemency by Donald Trump
