= Ronald Giles =

Chief Judge of Michigan's 36th District Court

Judge Ronald Giles is a Judge of Michigan's 36th District Court in Detroit, Michigan.

== Biography ==
Judge Giles was born in Detroit where he attended Cass Technical High School. He served in the U.S. Army as a Medical Corpsman and Neuropsychiatry Specialist before attending Wayne State University where he received his Bachelor of Science in Criminal Justice, and a Master of Arts in Guidance and Counseling. He also received his Juris Doctor degree at Wayne State. As an attorney, Judge Giles practiced for 22 years and worked as general counsel for a community mental health organization, a hearing referee for the Michigan Department of Civil Rights and maintained a general law practice with a concentration in Juvenile law, Criminal law, Family law, Immigration and Civil Rights.

== Kwame Kilpatrick ==
Giles came to national attention on August 7, 2008, when he remanded Detroit Mayor Kwame Kilpatrick to Wayne County Jail for violating the terms of his bond. The mayor had been charged with perjury, misconduct and obstruction of justice, and took an unauthorized trip to Windsor, Ontario, without the Court's knowledge or permission. Judge Giles' order represented the first time in Detroit history that a sitting mayor had been ordered to jail. In making his ruling, Judge Giles said he was required to make his ruling as though it were "John Sixpack" sitting in front of him and not the Mayor of Detroit. When Judge Giles was assigned to the Kilpatrick case, prosecutors had moved to disqualify him because he had previously made a $300 contribution to a past Kilpatrick political campaign. No basis was found to disqualify Judge Giles, and he continued to handle the case. In late July 2008, Judge Giles had reduced Kilpatrick's bond from $75,000 to $7,500, but also revoked Kipatrick's privilege to travel without a court hearing. Judge Giles also ordered Kilpatrick to undergo periodic and random drug testing at that time. When Kilpatrick was accused of pushing a process server around the same time, Judge Giles warned the mayor in open court, saying, "You're a licensed attorney. You're a public official. Everything you do, every step you take, every word you say is somewhere recorded for everyone to hear. You need to keep that in mind."
