= St. Hedwig Cemetery (Michigan) =

Cemetery in Wayne county, Michigan, US

Coordinates: 42°20′00″N 83°16′09″W

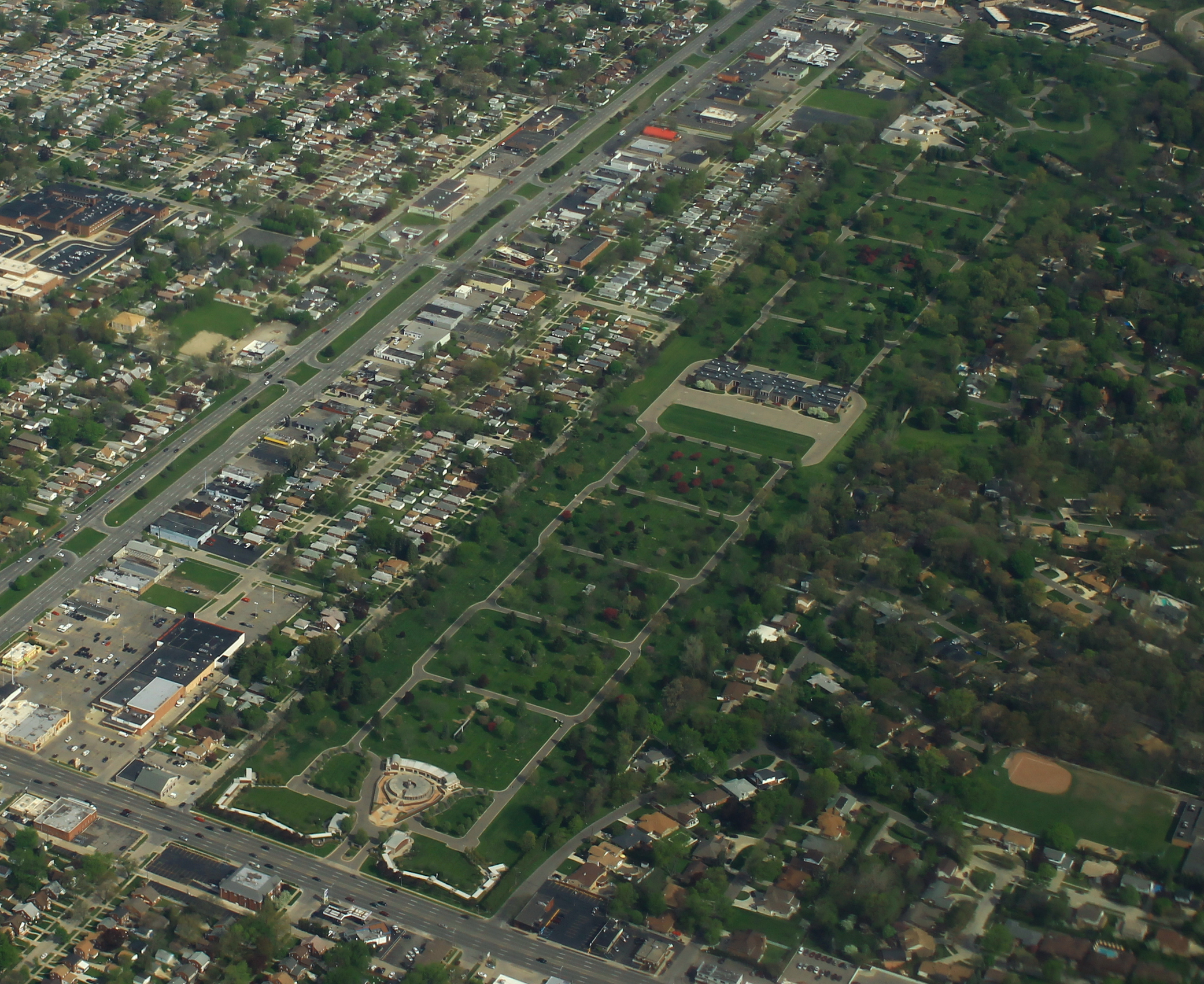
- Aerial image of the cemetery
- Interactive map of St. Hedwig Cemetery

Details
- Established: 1924
- Location: Dearborn Heights, Michigan
- Type: Catholic cemetery
- Size: 70 acres (28 ha)

St. Hedwig Cemetery is a Catholic cemetery and mausoleum located in Dearborn Heights, Michigan, United States. It was founded in 1924, and is operated by the Conventual Franciscans of Saint Bonaventure Province. Spanning some 70 acres (280,000 m^{2}) of land, it is landscaped and adorned with numerous monuments, as well as a large mausoleum. It is named for Saint Hedwig of Andechs. Though the metropolitan Detroit area has historically had a large number of persons of Polish heritage, the cemetery was not named for Jadwiga of Poland, the Queen of Poland who was canonized a saint in 1997.

== Notable burials ==
St. Hedwig Cemetery has the interred remains of several World War I and World War II veterans. Daniel S. Paletko (1950–2020) is interred at St. Hedwig Cemetery. Paletko had previously served as a state representative, and at the time of his death, was the mayor of Dearborn Heights. Also, Olympic figure skater Chris Bowman (1967–2008) is buried at St. Hedwig.
