= Thumb Correctional Facility =

Prison in Lapeer, Michigan

Thumb Correctional Facility (TCF)
- Interactive map of Thumb Correctional Facility (TCF)
- Location: Lapeer, Michigan; 43.03414°N 83.35605°W
- Status: Open
- Security class: Level II
- Capacity: 1,216
- Opened: 1987
- Managed by: Michigan Department of Corrections
- Warden: Fredeane Artis
- Website: Official website

Thumb Correctional Facility (TCF) is a Michigan prison, located in Lapeer, for male prisoners. It is a Level II, lower-level security prison.

== Facility ==
The prison was opened in 1987, and has six housing units currently used to house approximately 1,200 male Michigan Department of Corrections prisoners. Four housing units are for approximately 700 adult inmates, and two housing units are for approximately 500 teenage inmates. It is the only prison in Michigan that houses male juvenile offenders. Onsite facilities provide for foodservice, health care, facility maintenance, storage, prison administration, and industrial laundry services. The facility employs approximately 315 people.

=== Security ===
The facility is surrounded by triple 12-foot (3.7 m) fences with razor-ribbon wire and guard towers. Electronic detection systems and patrol vehicles are used to maintain perimeter security.

== Services ==
The facility offers libraries, a barber shop, prison worker programs, education programs, substance-abuse treatment, group therapy, and religious services. Onsite medical and dental care is supplemented by the Duane L. Waters Hospital near Jackson, Michigan.

The worker program allows the prison's laundry facility to provide services to several organizations in the area.

== Notable inmates ==
Inmate Name	Register Number	Status	Details
Ethan Crumbley	734210	Serving 4 life sentences without parole plus an additional 24 years.	Perpetrator of the 2021 Oxford High School shooting in which he murdered four students and injured 7 more. Due to the severity of his crimes, he was tried as an adult. Transferred to Oaks Correctional Facility, on April 28, 2024, when he turned 18 years old, to start to serve his sentence in Oaks.
Charles Pickett Jr.	485575 / 5278911L	Serving a minimum of 40 years.	Convicted of murdering 5 people while under the influence in what is known as the 2016 Kalamazoo bicycle crash.

== See also ==
- List of Michigan state prisons
