= William Rutledge (disambiguation) =

- William Rutledge, Australian politician
- William P. Rutledge, American police chief who served as head of the Detroit Police Department
- William Robert Rutledge, Canadian politician
