= Daniel S. Paletko =

American politician (1950–2020)

Mayor of Dearborn Heights
- In office January 2004 – December 29, 2020
- Preceded by: Ruth Canfield
- Succeeded by: Bill Bazzi

Member of the Michigan House of Representatives from the 17th district
- In office January 1, 2003 – 2004
- Preceded by: Jim A. Plakas
- Succeeded by: Andy Dillon

Personal details
- Born: December 21, 1950
- Died: December 29, 2020 (aged 70) Dearborn Heights, Michigan
- Party: Democratic
- Education: University of Michigan-Dearborn; University of Detroit; Wayne State University

Daniel S. Paletko (December 21, 1950 – December 29, 2020) was an American politician who served as mayor of Dearborn Heights, Michigan, from 2004 to 2020.

== Early life and education ==
Paletko was born on December 21, 1950. Paletko graduated from Crestwood High School. Paletko earned a BA from the University of Michigan-Dearborn, an MBA from the University of Detroit, and an MST from Wayne State University.

== Career ==
Paletko formerly worked as a Certified Public Accountant and a financial manager at Ford Motor Company. Paletko first got involved with politics by attending Dearborn Heights city council meetings. Paletko served on the city council from 1974 to 2002. On November 5, 2002, Paletko was elected to the Michigan House of Representatives where he represented the 17th district from January 8, 2003, to 2004. In January 2004, Paletko was appointed as the mayor of Dearborn Heights after the retiring of former mayor Ruth Canfield, and Paletko resigned from the state house to take this position. At the time of his death, Paletko was the city's longest serving mayor.

== Personal life ==
Paletko had two daughters. Paletko was a member of the American Legion. Paletko attended and ushered at St. Linus Catholic Church in Dearborn Heights.

=== Death and legacy ===
Paletko died in office from complications of COVID-19 on December 29, 2020, during the COVID-19 pandemic in Michigan. He was 70 years old. The Dearborn Heights City Council President Denise Malinowski-Maxwell became interim mayor after Paletko's death. Paletko was succeeded by Bill Bazzi, Dearborn Heights' first Muslim mayor. Paletko was interred at St. Hedwig Cemetery in Dearborn Heights on January 4, 2021.

On April 29, 2021, Dearborn Heights Mayor Bazzi, along with other city officials, in celebration of Arbor Day, planted an American Linden tree in memorial of Paletko. A plaque erected at the base of the tree is dedicated to Paletko and his tenure as mayor. Police Corporal Carrie Hatten, Fire Marshal Max Mitts and Firefighter Jammal Faraj organized a memorial golf outing for Paletko on June 18, 2021.
