= 2016 Kalamazoo shootings =

Spree shooting in Michigan, U.S.

- Location: Kalamazoo, Richland Township and Texas Township, Kalamazoo County, Michigan, U.S.
- Date: February 20, 2016; 5:42 – 10:24 p.m. (EST)
- Attack type: Spree shooting, mass shooting, drive-by shooting
- Weapons: Glock 19 Gen 3; Walther P99
- Deaths: 6
- Injuries: 2
- Perpetrator: Jason Brian Dalton
- Motive: Unknown

On the night of February 20, 2016, a spree shooting took place at an apartment complex, a Kia car dealership, and outside a Cracker Barrel restaurant in Kalamazoo County, Michigan. Six people were killed, and two others were injured.

Police detained a 45-year-old Uber driver, Jason Brian Dalton, in the shootings. He was subsequently charged with murder, assault, and criminal firearm use two days after the shootings. After he was found competent to stand trial, Dalton's lawyers planned a legal insanity defense for their client. Disagreeing with the strategies of his lawyers, Dalton pleaded guilty to all charges in a Michigan court on January 7, 2019.

== Events ==
=== Before the shootings ===
Hours before the shootings, Jason Brian Dalton went to three different gun stores with a friend. At one of them, he purchased a black jacket with pockets designed to conceal a handgun. Though the store owner said Dalton was in "good spirits" during the visit, the friend who accompanied Dalton said that he was a "little more quiet than normal" during the trip. Dalton was an occasional customer at the same store, but never purchased a firearm there.

Shortly after 4:00 p.m. on February 20, 2016, Matt Mellen requested an Uber pickup to drive him over to a friend's house. He was picked up at 4:21 by Dalton, who was driving a silver Chevrolet Equinox. During the drive, Dalton received a call, and after finishing, he allegedly "started driving crazy". At one point, he entered an oncoming lane of traffic, drove through a median strip, ignored a stop sign, and sideswiped a Ford Taurus, all the while ignoring Mellen's pleas to stop. When Dalton came to a stop at another stop sign, Mellen jumped out and called 9-1-1. He gave the dispatcher information about Dalton's Equinox, including its license plate number, and the dispatcher put out a "Be on the lookout" notification on the vehicle. There were multiple calls to 911 by others before the following incidents took place, all of which were ignored.

At 4:34, Dalton returned home and then called his wife 41 minutes later, asking her for the keys to their Chevy HHR. They agreed to meet at his parents' residence, located approximately 10 miles (16 km) away. On the way, however, Dalton accepted another pickup request at 5:15, from a woman who wanted him to pick up her boyfriend at a Richland Township apartment complex.

=== Richland Township apartment shooting ===
The shootings began around 5:42 EST when a woman was shot a total of four times in a parking lot of the same apartment complex. She survived her injuries. According to the woman, she was confronted by a man in a vehicle with a German Shepherd-type dog sitting in the back. The driver asked her if she was another person by a different name. When she replied that she was not, the man turned his car around and fired repeatedly at her. She survived by playing dead. Approximately fifteen rounds were fired; ten shell casings were recovered at the scene of the first shooting. Five children, including the woman's daughter, were present at the scene of the shooting, but they escaped unharmed through her efforts.

Investigators believe that Dalton's request for an Uber ride at the apartment complex had become botched. The requester texted Dalton moments after the initial request with a correction of the address, which would have led him to another location in the same area. She later attempted to call him to follow up with him on the address correction, but he did not respond. A witness later reported seeing an Equinox driving "so aggressively" towards the apartment, at one point cutting him off at a southbound curve and risking a head-on collision; he later recognized Dalton on the news as the Equinox's driver. At 6:05, approximately twenty minutes after the first shooting occurred, Dalton called the requester, saying that he hadn't responded to her text and that he could not do the ride because "something had come up".

=== Between the first and second shootings ===
One minute after the shooting, Dalton's Equinox was seen driving through a red traffic light at an intersection approximately 1 mile (1.6 km) away from the crime scene. It struck another vehicle and fled the scene, with the driver calling 9-1-1 to report the crash. At around the same time, a neighbor found the injured woman, who was soon treated by responding emergency personnel.

Later on, Dalton allegedly met with his wife and children at his parents' home in Comstock Township. He explained to his wife that the Equinox had been sideswiped by a disgruntled taxi driver in a Chevrolet Impala, who fired a gunshot at him due to rage at having his business taken away by Uber. He then assured her that he called Uber and they were handling the incident. He also provided his wife with a 9 mm Taurus handgun, telling her it was not safe to be at the house without it. In addition, he instructed her not to go to work and not to take their children to school. Dalton then attempted to leave in the Hummer H3, but it would not start, so he took the black Chevrolet HHR that his wife had been driving. As he left, he allegedly told his wife that he could not tell her what was going on, but that it would be on the news.

After leaving, Dalton withdrew money from an automated teller machine at 6:44. Then, after driving around for 35 minutes, he allegedly returned to his house and switched handguns. He left again at 7:37 and continued accepting Uber requests, which he carried out without incident. None of the passengers he took noticed anything unusual or alarming about him. Later that night, at 8:26, Dalton called his wife and told her not to call her parents.

=== Kia dealership and Cracker Barrel shootings ===
At 10:01, the shooter arrived at a Kia dealership in Kalamazoo. According to a witness, after parking his car, the shooter approached her boyfriend and his father at 10:05, and asked them what they were looking at. Before they could respond, he fired approximately eighteen rounds, fatally striking both males. One was struck by nine bullets, the other was struck by seven bullets. Other witnesses in a Burger King parking lot across the street recorded the shooter fleeing, and one called 9-1-1 a minute after the shots were fired.

About ten minutes later, a third shooting occurred outside a Cracker Barrel restaurant in Texas Township, located about 5 miles (8.0 km) from the Kia dealership. Four people seated inside two vehicles were killed and one other person was wounded. The shooter reportedly approached one victim inside a white van, asked her a question, and then shot her before shooting into an adjacent vehicle, which contained the other victims. This shooting took about one minute before the gunman fled. He was alleged to have returned home and reloaded his gun there.

=== Police response, manhunt, and Dalton's arrest ===
After officers responding to the scene of the Kia dealership shooting heard reports of the gunfire at Cracker Barrel, they realized there might be a mobile active shooter. Interviewing witnesses, police learned the gunman was driving a dark-colored Chevrolet HHR. Using newly installed security footage from the Kia dealership, police put out a description of the gunman over the radio. The Kalamazoo Department of Public Safety (KDPS) issued a statement to the public on its Facebook page, warning residents to be on the lookout for the shooter and his vehicle. Numerous traffic stops of vehicles matching the description of the gunman's were also conducted. In addition, multiple reports of gunfire at several locations, including the Western Michigan University (WMU) campus, were investigated but ultimately determined to be false.

As police continued the manhunt, Dalton reportedly continued to accept Uber fares. At 12:04 a.m. on February 21, he picked up three people and dropped them off at a dormitory on the WMU campus. The passengers later recalled that their driver wasn't overly friendly, but did nothing to alarm them. Later, at 12:12, Dalton picked up four people and drove them to their hotel. During the ride, one passenger, who had been hearing reports of the shooting spree, jokingly asked Dalton, "Are you the shooter?" Dalton simply replied, "No." A few minutes later, he picked up another three people, and just like the previous ride, a passenger asked if he was the shooter, which Dalton vehemently denied.

At 12:36, a police sergeant with the Kalamazoo County Sheriff's Office observed Dalton dropping off the three passengers, followed him, and requested backup. He was joined by a KDPS officer, and the two conducted a traffic stop at 12:40. When additional officers arrived, the first two pulled Dalton out of his vehicle and arrested him. At the time of his arrest, Dalton was wearing the jacket he purchased from the gun store, along with a bulletproof vest. He told police that he bought the vest for his son, who was an explorer for the Kalamazoo County Sheriff's Office. They found a handgun at the back of his waistband.

Police believe none of the victims at the separate scenes were connected. At least 30 rounds were said to have been fired during the shootings.

Locations
Location	Casualties	Time
Meadows Townhomes complex 5066 Meadows Boulevard; 42.3338°N 85.5203°W	One wounded	5:42 p.m.
Seelye Kia Dealership; 4102 Stadium Drive; 42.2715°N 85.6384°W	Two dead	10:08 p.m.
Cracker Barrel; 5581 Cracker Barrel Boulevard; 42.2363°N 85.6779°W	Four dead, one wounded	10:24 p.m.

== Perpetrator ==
Jason Dalton
- Born: Jason Brian Dalton; June 22, 1970 (age 56)
- Education: Kalamazoo Valley Community College; WyoTech
- Occupations: Uber driver Insurance adjuster Mechanic
- Spouse: Carole Dalton (m. 1995; div. 2017)
- Children: 2

Jason Brian Dalton (born June 22, 1970) was identified by police as the suspect in the shootings. Police detained Dalton on February 21 at around 12:40 a.m. EST without incident, after pulling over his vehicle, a black Chevrolet HHR that matched the description of the getaway vehicle in the shootings.

After his arrest, Dalton confessed to committing the shootings. However, he blamed his actions on his Uber mobile app, claiming that its symbol resembled that of the Order of the Eastern Star, and that it took over his body during the events after he pressed the button of a new app resembling the Devil when it abruptly popped up. He later said that he was no longer experiencing these problems. Police indicated that he had no known criminal history or mental health record.

=== Personal life ===
Dalton was raised in Greenfield, Indiana, and went to middle and high school in nearby Charlottesville. He attended Comstock High School in Kalamazoo, graduating in 1989. He then attended Kalamazoo Valley Community College and graduated in December 1992 with an associate degree in law enforcement, though he did not enroll in the school's police academy program.

Dalton married wife Carole in 1995, and the couple had two children together, aged 10 and 15 at the time of his killing spree. Carole Dalton started divorce proceedings the week after the killings. The family was living in nearby Cooper Township.

Dalton was generally described as a "nice guy" and a "good family man", though it was reported that he had been acting depressed in the days before the shootings occurred. Later, neighbors said Dalton had been acting paranoid right before the shootings occurred.

According to an old friend, Dalton had tried to seek a job as a police officer in Michigan or in nearby states, but was unable to, and had no interest in moving far away to find a police job. Instead, he studied auto-body work at WyoTech in Laramie, Wyoming, and found work at a BMW office in New Jersey at one point. This allowed him to get jobs as a mechanic and then an insurance adjuster.

Dalton worked as a driver for Uber during the two weeks preceding the killing spree and purportedly took fares between shooting incidents. An Uber representative stated that Dalton had passed company background checks.

A former coworker of Dalton's at the insurance company recalled seeing Dalton yell at a customer over the phone, slam the phone down, and pace around the desk angrily afterwards. Dalton had previously been counseled about his professionalism towards customers. In an interview, another customer reported an encounter with Dalton in which he called him back over to reexamine a vehicle for damage Dalton missed in his appraisal. He described Dalton as unprofessional and prone to anger.

=== Other police questioning ===
In the week following the shootings, Dalton was questioned by deputies with the Calhoun County Sheriff's Office, who were investigating a series of shootings along Interstate 94 and Interstate 69. Although Dalton traveled in the area where the shootings occurred and had been the insurance adjuster for a damaged sheriff patrol vehicle, he was cleared of any involvement.

=== Weapons ===
A 9 mm Walther P99 semi-automatic handgun with an extended magazine was recovered from inside Dalton's car. Police believe that the Walther P99 was used during the last two shootings, while a 9 mm Glock 19 semi-automatic handgun was used in the first shooting; Dalton reportedly switched guns after the Glock malfunctioned while firing. Among other items, another fifteen firearms (eleven long guns and four handguns) were recovered from his home.

Dalton purchased the Glock from an Oshtemo Township gun store on June 12, 2015. He then purchased the Walther from the same store later that year, on August 22. However, he did not have a license to carry a concealed weapon. The Glock was among the four handguns recovered from Dalton's home.

== Victims ==
The first people killed were Tyler D. Smith (17), and his father Richard E. Smith (53), who were both killed at the Kia car dealership. Four women – Mary Jo Nye (60), Mary Lou Nye (62), Dorothy Brown (74), and Barbara Hawthorne (68) – were killed at the Cracker Barrel. All four women were friends, and Mary Jo Nye and Mary Lou Nye were sisters-in-law.

Abigail Kopf (14) suffered several injuries at Cracker Barrel, including a gunshot wound to the head. At the time of her shooting, she was accompanying victim Barbara Hawthorne, a close friend whom she called her grandmother. She was initially reported dead, but later confirmed to have survived. As of February 23, she remained on a ventilator and in critical condition, though she was breathing on her own by February 28 and was able to open her eyes by March 3. Kopf was discharged from Bronson Methodist Hospital on March 8 and transferred to the Mary Free Bed Rehabilitation Hospital in Grand Rapids, Michigan. Her skull was damaged during the Cracker Barrel shooting, and she underwent surgery at Bronson Methodist Hospital to replace the missing portion of her skull. She had to undergo surgery again due to an infection induced by her previous surgery. Kopf was discharged on July 26 and allowed to return home, but had to undergo surgery yet again on August 17 due to a related skin infection. The surgery was successfully completed two days later.

Tiana Carruthers (25) was the first victim to be shot in the shootings, being shot four times in the left arm, legs, and back, but survived. Her shooting occurred in the parking lot of an apartment in Richland Township. Her arm had to be surgically reconstructed as a result of the shooting. In August 2016 she underwent two further surgeries on her legs due to a medical setback.

== Legal proceedings ==
On February 22, 2016, Dalton was arraigned on sixteen charges including six counts of murder, two counts of assault with intent to commit murder, and eight counts of using a firearm during the commission of a felony. He was to reappear in court on March 10 for a preliminary examination hearing. On March 3, he was ordered to undergo a psychiatric evaluation to determine his competence to stand trial. He reappeared in court on April 22, where it was ruled by the Michigan Center for Forensic Psychiatry that he was found competent to stand trial. Eusebio Solis, a former Calhoun County Chief Assistant Prosecutor and a former Calhoun County Commissioner, was appointed to represent Dalton in court.

Dalton appeared on May 20 for a preliminary hearing to determine if there was enough evidence to try him on the charges. During the hearing, Dalton made a verbal outburst and interrupted Tiana Carruthers, the first victim attacked in the shootings, while she was testifying. He reportedly made "somewhat indecipherable statements" and caused Carruthers to cry, forcing a recess to be called. Dalton was restrained and removed from the courtroom by sheriff's deputies. The hearing resumed later in the day, with Dalton participating via video hookup from jail.

On June 6, following a pretrial conference, Dalton's attorneys announced their plans to present a legal insanity defense for their client. He underwent a psychiatric evaluation conducted by the Michigan Center for Forensic Psychiatry in Saline, a process that was carried out over the next 60 days. His trial was tentatively expected to start in late September or early October. A status conference was tentatively set for August 15. On August 12, the conference was postponed to September 30, with the Kalamazoo County chief assistant prosecutor saying that the evaluation has not yet been finished. On that day, the conference was delayed again because Dalton's psychological report was not yet finished. A June 13, 2017 trial date was set. This trial date was later delayed. Jury selection was later scheduled to start January 3, 2019, with opening statements being scheduled to start January 7, 2019.

On January 7, 2019, Dalton pleaded guilty to all counts against him. On February 5, 2019, Dalton was sentenced to life in prison without the possibility of parole. Dalton is currently imprisoned in the Oaks Correctional Facility.

== Reactions ==
Joe Sullivan, Uber's Chief Security Officer, released a statement reading, "We are horrified and heartbroken at the senseless violence in Kalamazoo, Michigan. Our hearts and prayers are with the families of the victims of this devastating crime and those recovering from injuries. We have reached out to the police to help with their investigation in any way that we can." Calls were made for Uber to improve its background check system.

In response to the shootings, President Barack Obama praised law enforcement agencies and pledged federal support for the ongoing investigation.

Following the shootings, there was public outcry when it was revealed there was no active-shooter alert that could be sent to Kalamazoo-area residents and students at Western Michigan University. An editorial calling for an emergency alert system for such high-profile incidents was published by Michigan Live six days after the shootings. In March, legislation for a statewide warning system was introduced. This warning system would disseminate information on an active-shooter situation or other emergencies and protect residents. It involved local law enforcement agencies sending the information to the Michigan State Police, which was then responsible for sending text messages of warning using geolocation technology, similar to the Amber alert system. On May 10, the Michigan House of Representatives approved the legislation. On June 9, the Michigan Senate approved the legislation and sent it to Governor Snyder for consideration. Snyder signed the legislation on June 24.

== See also ==
- List of homicides in Michigan
- List of rampage killers in the United States
