= Kwame Kilpatrick =

American politician (born 1970)

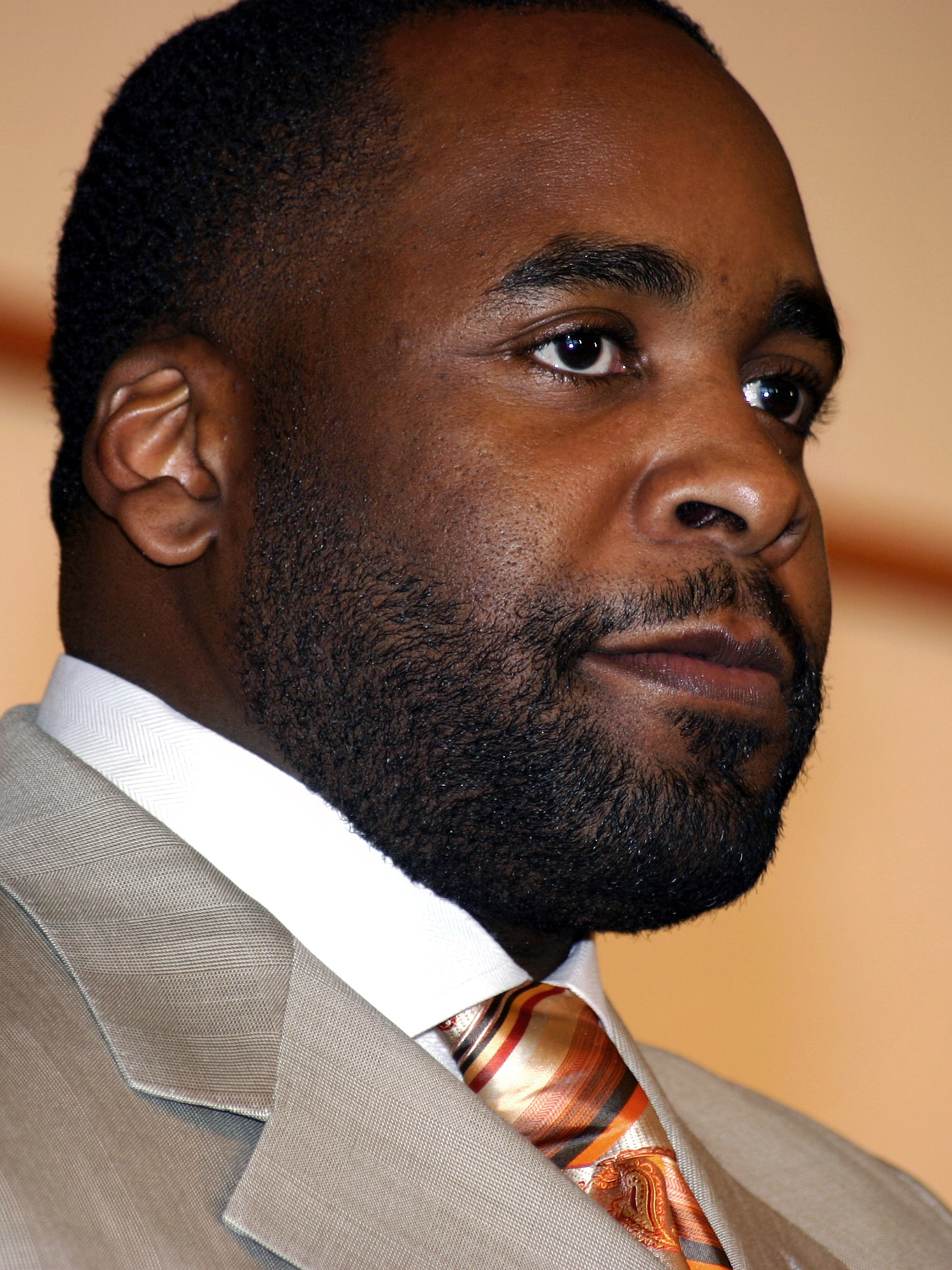
- Kilpatrick in 2006

72nd Mayor of Detroit
- In office January 1, 2002 – September 18, 2008
- Preceded by: Dennis Archer
- Succeeded by: Kenneth Cockrel Jr.

Member of the Michigan House of Representatives from the 9th district
- In office January 1, 1997 – January 1, 2002
- Preceded by: Carolyn Cheeks Kilpatrick
- Succeeded by: Fred Durhal Jr.

Personal details
- Born: Kwame Malik Kilpatrick; June 8, 1970 (age 56) Detroit, Michigan, US
- Party: Democratic
- Spouses: Carlita Poles (m. 1995; div. 2018); Laticia McGee (m. 2021)
- Children: 5
- Education: Florida A&M University (BS); Michigan State University (JD)
- Profession: Politician, author, teacher

Kwame Malik Kilpatrick (born June 8, 1970) is an American former politician who served as the 72nd mayor of Detroit from 2002 to 2008. A former member of the Democratic Party, he previously represented the 9th district in the Michigan House of Representatives from 1997 to 2002. Kilpatrick resigned as mayor in September 2008 after being convicted of perjury and obstruction of justice. He was sentenced to four months in jail and was released on probation after serving 99 days.

In 2010, Kilpatrick was sentenced to eighteen months to five years in state prison for violating his probation, and served time at the Oaks Correctional Facility in northwest Michigan. In March 2013, he was convicted on 24 federal felony counts, including mail fraud, wire fraud, and racketeering. In October 2013, Kilpatrick was sentenced to 28 years in prison, and was incarcerated at the Federal Correctional Institution in El Reno, Oklahoma. In 2021, president Donald Trump commuted his sentence and Kilpatrick was released from prison.

== Early life, education, and family ==
Kwame Malik Kilpatrick was born June 8, 1970, to Bernard Kilpatrick and Carolyn Cheeks Kilpatrick. His parents divorced in 1981. Kilpatrick attended Detroit's Cass Technical High School and graduated from Florida A&M University with a Bachelor of Science degree in political science in 1992. While at FAMU, he played football under NFL Hall of Famer Ken Riley as an offensive tackle and was team captain. On September 9, 1995, he married Carlita Poles in Detroit. They have three children together, Jalil, Jonas, and Jelani. In 1999 he received a Juris Doctor from Detroit College of Law-Michigan State University He has a sister Ayanna and a half-sister, Diarra Kilpatrick, who is an actor and producer.

Kilpatrick's mother Carolyn was a career politician, representing Detroit in Michigan House of Representatives from 1979 to 1996 and serving in the United States House of Representatives for Michigan's 13th congressional district from 1996 to 2010. She was not re-elected to office because she lost her primary election in August 2010 to State Senator Hansen Clarke. NPR and CBS News both noted that throughout her re-election campaign, Carolyn was dogged by questions about Kilpatrick following his tenure as mayor of Detroit.

Kilpatrick's father Bernard was a semi-professional basketball player and politician. He was elected to the Wayne County Commission, served as head of Wayne County Health and Human Services Department from 1989 to 2002, and as chief of staff to former Wayne County Executive Edward H. McNamara. Later he operated a Detroit consulting firm called Maestro Associates.

Kilpatrick filed for divorce from Carlita in 2018. In July 2021 he married Laticia Maria McGee at Historic Little Rock Missionary Baptist Church in Detroit.

== Michigan state representative ==
Kilpatrick was elected to the Michigan House of Representatives in 1996 after his mother vacated her Detroit-based seat to mount a successful bid for Congress. Kilpatrick's campaign staff consisted of high school classmates Derrick Miller and Christine Beatty, who became his legislative aide; later, Kilpatrick had an affair with Beatty. According to Kilpatrick, the campaign was run on a budget of $10,000 and did not receive endorsements from trade unions, congressional districts, or the Democratic establishment.

Kilpatrick was elected minority floor leader for the Michigan Democratic Party, serving in that position 1998 to 2000. He was subsequently elected as house minority leader in 2001, the first African-American to hold that position.

In 2001, Kilpatrick used his influence while in the Michigan legislature to direct state grant money to two organizations that were vague on their project description. The groups were run by friends of Kilpatrick and both agreed to subcontract work to U.N.I.T.E., a company owned by Kilpatrick's wife Carlita. Carlita was the firm's only employee, and the firm received $175,000 from the organizations. Detroit 3D was one of the groups and the State canceled its second and final installment of $250,000 because 3D refused to divulge details on how the funds were being spent.

== First mayoral term (2002–2006) ==
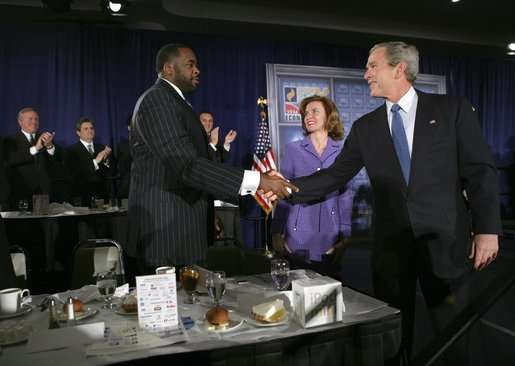
Kilpatrick greeting President George W. Bush in 2005

On New Year’s Day 2002, Kilpatrick was sworn-in as the youngest mayor of Detroit when he took office at age 31.

During his first term, Kilpatrick was criticized for using city funds to lease a Lincoln Navigator for use by his family and using his city-issued credit card to charge thousands of dollars' worth of spa massages, extravagant dining, and expensive wines. Kilpatrick paid back $9,000 of the $210,000 credit card charges. Meanwhile, Kilpatrick closed the century-old Belle Isle Zoo and Belle Isle Aquarium because of the city's budget problems. The City Council overrode his funding veto for the zoo and gave it a budget of $700,000.

In 2005, Time magazine named Kilpatrick as one of the worst mayors in America.

=== 2001 election ===
In 2001, Kilpatrick ran for mayor of Detroit, hiring Berg/Muirhead Associates for his campaign. They were retained as his public relations firm upon his election. During the 2000 presidential election, Kilpatrick was a Michigan state co-chair of GoreNet. GoreNet was a group that supported Al Gore's presidential campaign with a focus on grassroots and online organizing as well as hosting small dollar donor events.

=== Special administratorship ===
Since the 1970s, a federal judge had made the mayor of Detroit the special administrator of the Detroit Water Department because of severe pollution issues. When serious questions about water department contracts came to light in late 2005, Judge Feikens ended Kilpatrick's special administratorship in his capacity as mayor. In January 2006, The Detroit News reported that, "Kilpatrick used his special administrator authority to bypass the water board and City Council on three controversial contracts." These included a $131 million radio system for the city's police and fire departments, as well as a no-bid PR contract to a close personal aide. But Judge Feikens praised Kilpatrick's work as steward of the department, referring questions on the contracts to the special master in charge of that investigation.

=== Rumored Manoogian Mansion party and Greene killing ===
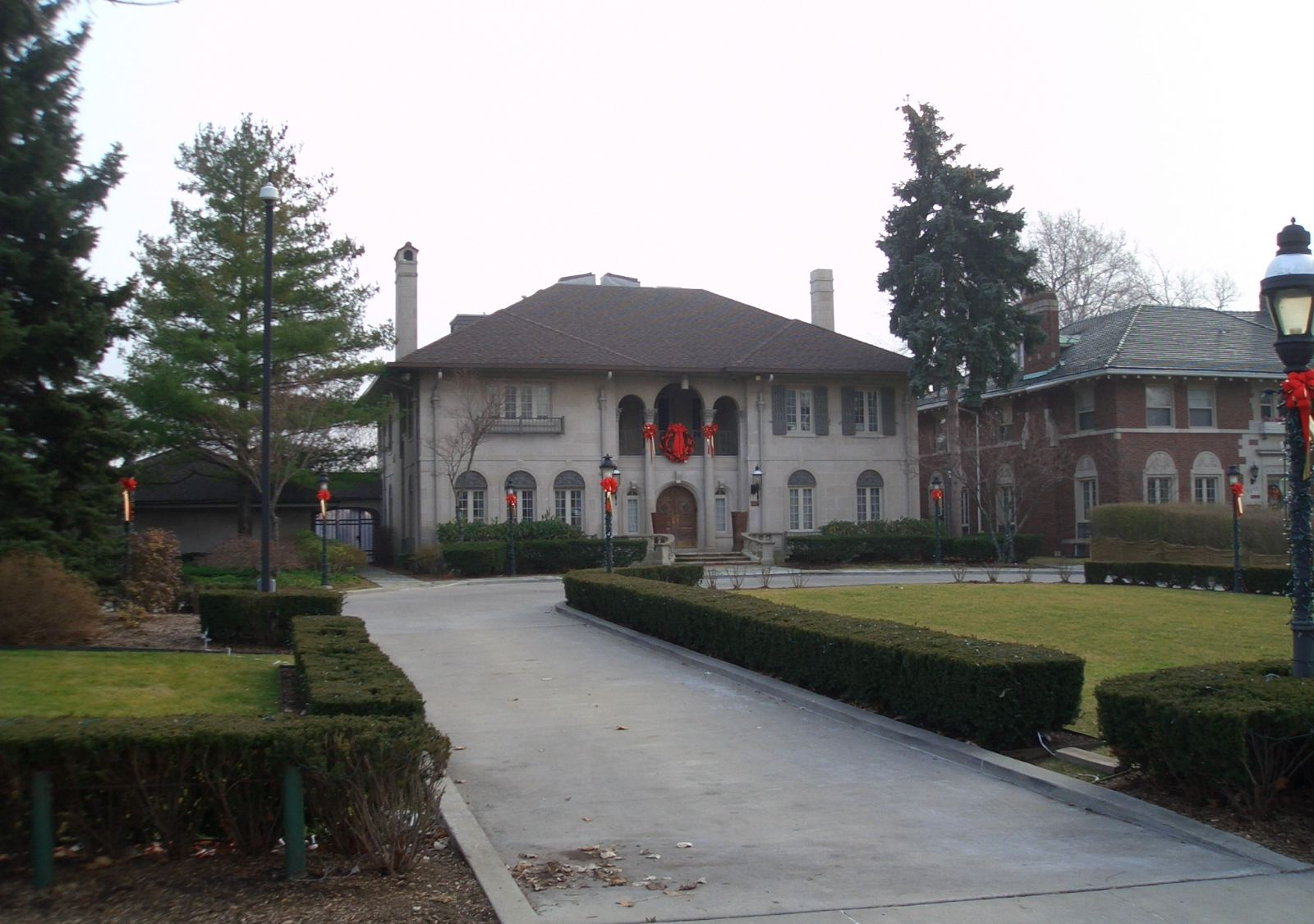
The Manoogian Mansion, official residence of the Mayor of Detroit

In the fall of 2002, it was alleged that Kilpatrick had held a wild party involving strippers at the Manoogian Mansion, the city-owned residence of the mayor of Detroit. Former members of the Executive Protection Unit (EPU), the mayor's police security detail, alleged that Carlita Kilpatrick, Kilpatrick's wife, came home unexpectedly and physically attacked an exotic dancer, Tamara Greene. Officer Harold C. Nelthrope contacted the Internal Affairs unit of the Detroit Police Department in April 2003 to recommend that they investigate abuses by the EPU. Kilpatrick denied any wrongdoing. An investigation by Michigan Attorney General Cox and the Michigan State Police found no evidence that the party took place.

Greene was murdered on April 30, 2003, at around 3:40 a.m., near the intersection of Roselawn and West Outer Drive while sitting in her car with her 32-year-old boyfriend. She was shot multiple times with a .40 caliber Glock pistol. At the time, this was the same model and caliber firearm as those officially issued by the Detroit Police Department. The family believed the killing to have been a "deliberate hit".

Greene's family filed a $150 million lawsuit against the city of Detroit in federal court, claiming she was murdered to prevent her testimony about the Manoogian Mansion party. In late 2011, Judge Gerald Ellis Rosen granted summary judgment in favor of the city. Greene's children appealed the decision, but the Sixth Circuit Court of Appeals affirmed the district-court decision. Several affidavits were filed in the lawsuit prior to its dismissal; in his summary-judgment order, Judge Rosen wrote, "[I]t is fair to say that the parties—and, in particular, Plaintiffs—were given wide latitude to pursue any and all matters that were arguably relevant to their claims or defenses". Many affidavits related to whether the party took place and whether Carlita and Greene had been in an altercation. Detroit Police lieutenant Alvin Bowman stated that he had suspected the shooter was a Detroit law-enforcement officer and claimed that high-ranking Detroit Police personnel, including Cummings, deliberately sabotaged his investigation, stating that he was eventually transferred out of the Homicide Division because he had asked too many questions about the Greene murder and the Manoogian Mansion party. Mayer Morganroth, the lawyer representing the city, said, "The Bowman affidavit is a little less than idiotic and more than absurd."

=== Denial of courtesy protection in Washington, D.C. ===
In 2002, the Washington D.C. police announced that they would only offer professional courtesy protection to Kilpatrick while he was conducting official business in the nation's capital. D.C. police no longer provided after-hours police protection to Kilpatrick because of his inappropriate partying during past visits. Sergeant Tyrone Dodson of Washington D.C. explained by saying "we arrived at this decision because we felt that the late evening partying on the part of Mayor Kilpatrick would leave our officers stretched too thin and might result in an incident at one of the clubs." The Kilpatrick administration alleged that the statements and actions of the Washington D.C. police were part of a political conspiracy to "ruin" the mayor.

=== 2005 re-election campaign ===
At a campaign rally in May 2005, Kilpatrick's father Bernard adamantly argued that allegations that the Mayor had held a party at the Manoogian Mansion were a lie, likening such statements to the false scapegoating of Jewish people by the Nazis. Bernard later apologized. In October 2005, a third-party group supporting Kilpatrick, named Citizens for Honest Government, generated controversy by its print advertisement that compared media criticism of the mayor to lynch mobs and accused his mayoral challenger, Freman Hendrix, as a collaborator in suburban exploitation of Detroit. The PAC treasurer for Citizens for Honest Government, Bill Miller, said his group wasn’t responsible for the ad and that he had no idea who placed it. The Michigan Secretary of State declined to investigate who placed the ad.

Kilpatrick and Hendrix, both Democrats, each initially claimed victory. However, as the votes were tallied, it became clear that Kilpatrick had come back from his stretch of unpopularity to win a second term in office. Three months previously, most commentators declared his political career over after he was the first incumbent mayor of Detroit to come in second in a primary. Pre-election opinion polls predicted a large win for Hendrix; however, Kilpatrick won with 53% of the vote.

== Second mayoral term (2006–2008) ==
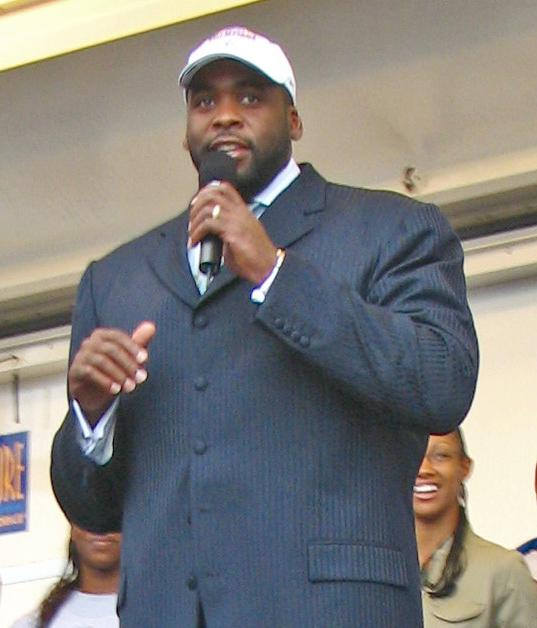
Kilpatrick in 2006

Kilpatrick won re-election in the 2005 mayoral election.

=== Tax plan ===
In July 2006, Detroit's City Council voted unanimously to approve Kilpatrick's tax plan, with which he intended to offer homeowners some relief from the city's high property tax rates. The cuts ranged from 18% to 35%, depending on the property's value.

=== Audit reports ===
The city of Detroit was fourteen months late in filing its 2005–2006 audit. In March 2008, officials estimated the audit would cost an additional $2.4 million because of new auditing requirements that were not addressed by the city. The 2006–2007 fiscal year audit due on December 31, 2007, was expected to be eleven months late.

The state treasury chose to withhold $35 million of its monthly revenue sharing to the city and required Detroit to receive approval before selling bonds to raise money. Kilpatrick told the City Council that he would take partial blame for the late audits because he laid off too many accountants, but he also blamed the firm hired to replace them.

=== Abuse of power allegations ===
It was revealed on July 15, 2008, by WXYZ reporter Steve Wilson that, in 2005, Kilpatrick, Christine Beatty, and the chief of police Ella Bully-Cummings allegedly used their positions to help an influential Baptist minister arrested for soliciting a prostitute get his case dismissed. The arresting officer, Antoinette Bostic, was told by her supervisors that Mangedwa Nyathi was a minister (Assistant Pastor at Hartford Memorial Baptist Church on Detroit's west side), and that the mayor and police chief were calling to persuade Bostic not to show up to court, in which case the judge would be forced to dismiss the case against Nyathi. Bostic ignored her supervisors and appeared in court.

The defense lawyer, Charles Hammons, had the case postponed a couple of times and stated in court that "the mayor told me yesterday that this case is not gonna go forward." Hammons admitted to Wilson that this was the fact and that this was how many cases for people who know the mayor in Detroit are handled. Bully-Cummings angrily denied that she had ever asked her officers to perform such acts of impropriety. Kilpatrick stated that Steve Wilson "was just making up stories".

==== Reporting on nepotism and preferential hiring of friends and family ====
A 2008 Detroit Free Press article revealed that at any given time there were about 100 Kilpatrick appointees employed by the City. The Press discovered that 29 of Kilpatrick's closest friends and family were appointed to positions in various city departments. Some appointees had little or no experience, while others, including Kilpatrick's uncle Ray Cheeks and cousin Nneka Cheeks, falsified their résumés. Kilpatrick's cousin Patricia Peoples was appointed deputy director of human resources, giving her the ability to hire more of Kilpatrick's friends and family without the hirings being viewed as mayoral appointments. The sheer volume of Kilpatrick's appointments compared to appointments made by predecessor mayors since 1970, along with Kilpatrick's elimination of thousands of city jobs, made his appointments controversial.

The jobs held by friends and family ranged from secretaries to department heads. The appointees had an average salary increase of 36% compared with a 2% raises in 2003 and 2004 for fellow city workers. Some of the biggest salary increases were for April Edgar, half-sister of Christine Beatty, whose pay increased 86% over 5 years. One of Kilpatrick's cousins, Ajene Evans, had a 77% salary increase during this 5-year period. The biggest salary increase among the 29 appointees was that of LaTonya Wallace-Hardiman who went from $32,500 staff secretary, to an executive assistant making $85,501—163% in five years.

=== 2008 assault of a police officer ===
On July 24, 2008, two local law enforcement detectives, Brian White and Joanne Kinney, went to the home of Kilpatrick's sister to serve a subpoena. While on the front porch of the home, Kilpatrick exited the house with his bodyguards and pushed White onto Kinney. The mayor yelled at Kinney: "How can a black woman be riding in a car with a man named White?"

Wayne County Sheriff Warren Evans later said: "There were armed executive protection officers. My officers were there armed. And all of them had the consummate good sense not to let it escalate"... and "the two officers 'wisely' left the property and returned to their office to report on the incident." Evans stated that due to the political nature of the incident, the investigation was transferred to Michigan State Police. Evans's daughter, a staffer for Kilpatrick, resigned shortly thereafter.

== Resignation from mayoralty, criminal conviction ==
=== Events leading up ===
==== Text-messaging scandal and coverup ====
In 2003, a civil lawsuit was filed against Kilpatrick by ex-bodyguard Harold Nelthrope and former Deputy Police Chief Gary Brown, who claimed they were fired in retaliation for an internal-affairs investigation. Brown had led the investigation, and Nelthrope had told investigators about the aforementioned rumors of a party that occurred at the Mayor's mansion. Both claimed that Kilpatrick was motivated, in part, by his concern that the probe would uncover his extramarital affairs. The trial began in August 2007. Kilpatrick and his chief of staff, Christine Beatty, both testified under oath that they were not involved in an extramarital affair. In September 2007, after three hours of deliberation, the jury found in favor of Nelthrope and Brown, awarding $6.5 million in damages. After the verdict was read, Kilpatrick said that the racial composition of the jury—which was mostly white and suburban—had played a role in the outcome and vowed an appeal.

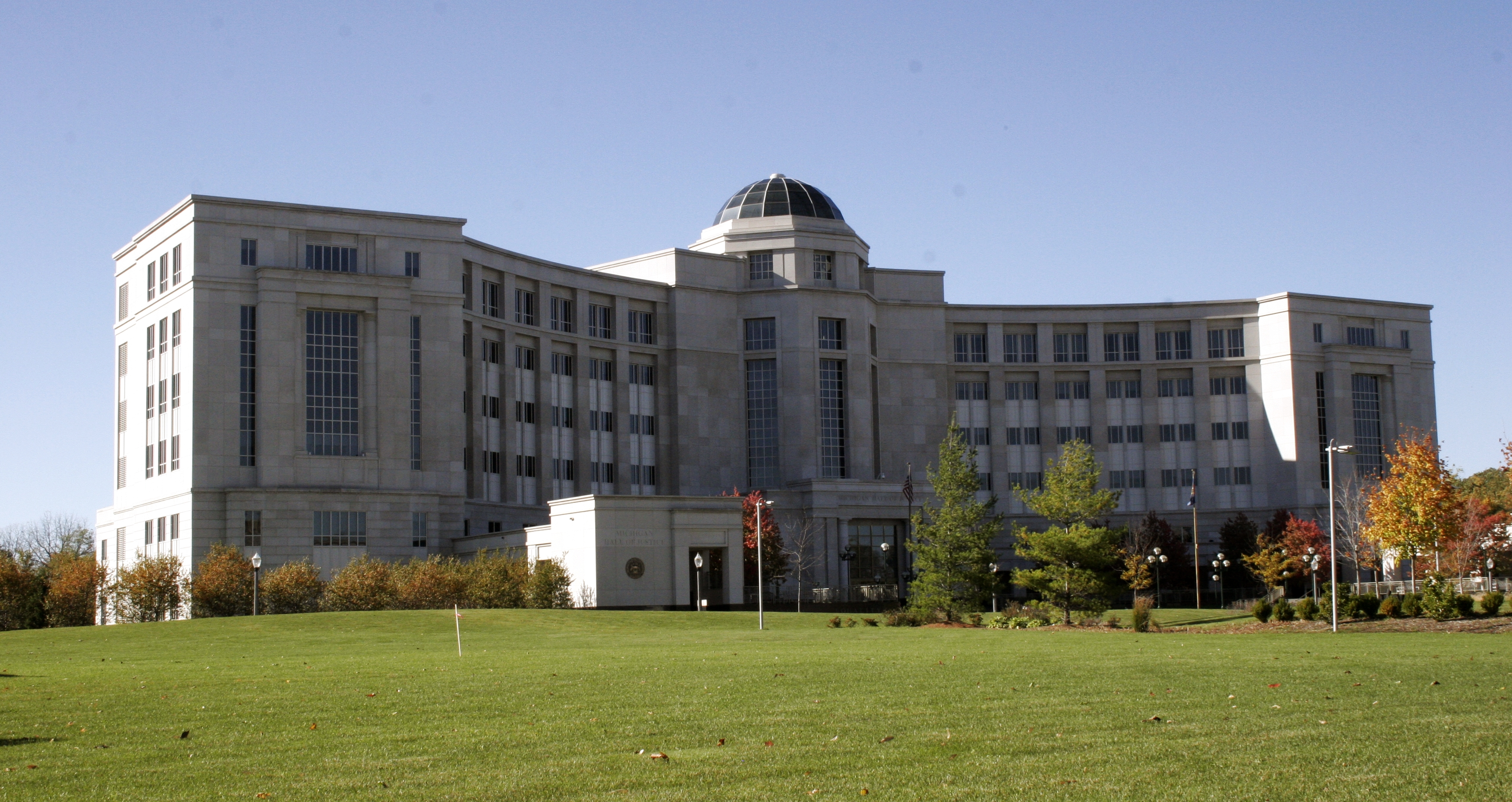
Michigan Hall of Justice, home of the Michigan Supreme Court

In October, plaintiffs' attorney Mike Stefani received thousands of text messages he had been endeavoring to obtain via subpoena—the messages indicated an affair between Kilpatrick and Beatty. A day after he presented the files to the city's attorneys, Kilpatrick announced that he had agreed to settle the case, and the city counsel approved the $8.4 million deal, which included a proviso that Stefani would turn the files over to the mayor. After the Detroit Free Press filed a Michigan Freedom of Information Act (FOIA) request, the proviso was removed from the main settlement document and put into a confidential supplement. But the Detroit Free Press and The Detroit News filed a FOIA suit, seeking all settlement-related documents, and, in February 2008, the Michigan Supreme Court ordered the settlement documents be turned over to the plaintiffs. The bulk of the text messages were released in late October 2008 by Circuit Court Judge Timothy Kenny, who instructed that some portions be redacted.

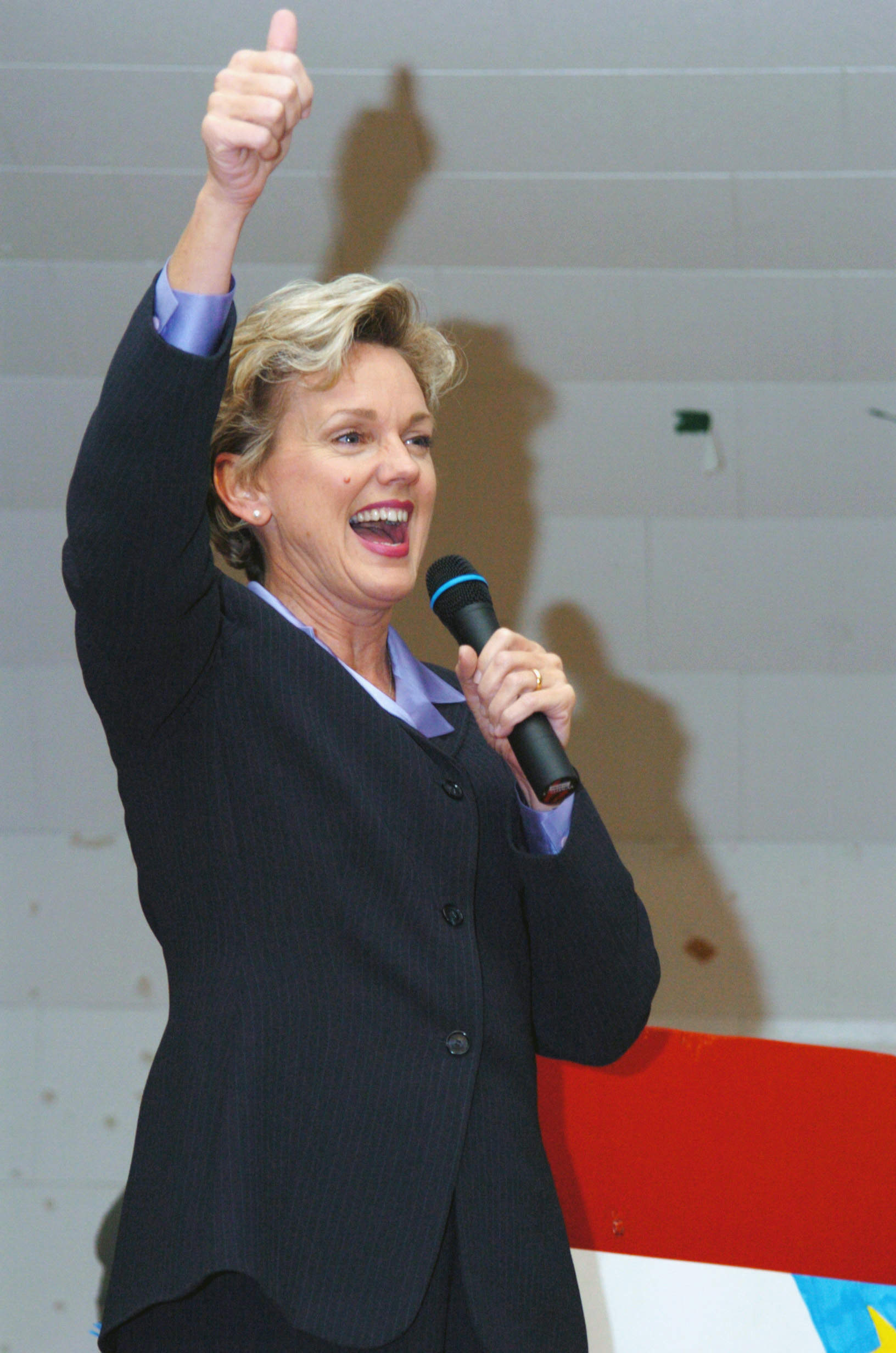
Michigan Governor Jennifer Granholm began an inquiry that led to the removal of Kilpatrick from office.

Beatty resigned from her position as Kilpatrick's chief of staff. The City Council requested that Kilpatrick resign as mayor and that Governor Granholm use her authority to remove him from office. Granholm said the inquiry was like a trial and that her role would be "functioning in a manner similar to that of a judicial officer." Kilpatrick said he had paid back the $8.4 million through "hard work for the city" and dismissed any intentions of removing himself from office as "political rhetoric".

==== 2008 "State of the City" address ====
In March 2008, Kilpatrick delivered his seventh "State of the City" address to the city of Detroit. The speech marked a turning point in his career. The majority of the 70-minute speech focused on positive changes occurring throughout Detroit and future plans. Kilpatrick specifically noted increased police surveillance, new policing technologies, and initiatives to rebuild blighted neighborhoods. He received repeated standing ovations from the invitation-only audience.

Toward the end of the speech, Kilpatrick deviated from the transcript given to the media and posted on his official website to address the scandals and controversies surrounding his years in office, saying that the media had focused on those controversies only to increase their viewership, and that their focus had led to racist attacks against him and his family.

Kilpatrick's comments generated many negative responses. Michigan governor and fellow Democrat Jennifer Granholm issued a statement in which she condemned the use of the N-word in any context. Michigan Attorney General Mike Cox stated on WJR talk radio that he thought that using the N-word was "reprehensible", saying, "I thought his statements were race-baiting on par with David Duke and George Wallace, all to save his political career. I'm not a Detroiter, but last night crossed the line ... those statements not only hurt Detroit, [but] as long as the mayor is there, he will be a drag on the whole region." Cox said that whether Kilpatrick is criminally charged or not, he should resign as mayor. Former Kilpatrick political adviser Sam Riddle labeled the address a race-baiting speech. "It's an act of desperation to use the N-word," said Riddle. "He's attempting to regain his base of support by playing the race card. He's gone to that well one too many times."

==== Recall effort against Kilpatrick ====
The Wayne County Election Committee approved a recall petition to remove Kilpatrick as mayor based, in part, on the accusation that Kilpatrick misled the City Council into approving the settlement. The recall petition was filed by Douglas Johnson, a city council candidate. Kilpatrick appealed to the commission to reconsider its decision on the grounds that Johnson was not a resident of Detroit. Johnson also requested that Jennifer Granholm use her power as Governor to remove Kilpatrick from office.

On March 12, 2008, at the request of the Mayor's office, Wayne County Election Commission rescinded its earlier approval for the recall. The Mayor's office argued that there was not any evidence that the organizer, Douglas Johnson, actually lived within the city limits of Detroit. Johnson stated that his group would refile using another person whose residency would not be an issue. On March 27, 2008, a second recall petition was filed against Kilpatrick by Angelo Brown. Brown stated in his filing that Kilpatrick is too preoccupied with his legal problems to be effective. Kilpatrick's spokesman James Canning again dismissed this latest recall by saying: "It's Mr. Brown's right to file a petition, but it's just another effort by a political hopeful to grab headlines."

On May 14 the Detroit City Council voted to request that the governor of Michigan, Jennifer Granholm, remove Kilpatrick from office.

=== Criminal charges brought ===
Kwame Kilpatrick
- Status: Commuted
- Convictions: Obstruction of justice (x2), assault of a police officer, racketeering, tax evasion, extortion, mail fraud
- Penalty: 120 days in jail & probation (original sentence); 1.5–5 years imprisonment (probation violation); 28 years in prison (federal trial)

On March 24, 2008, Wayne County Prosecutor Kym Worthy announced a twelve-count criminal indictment against Kilpatrick and Beatty, charging Kilpatrick with eight felonies and Beatty with seven. Charges for both included perjury, misconduct in office, and obstruction of justice. Worthy suggested that others in the Kilpatrick administration could also be charged. The preliminary examination scheduled for September 22, 2008, was waived by both defendants, thereby allowing the case to proceed directly to trial.

In July 2008, Kilpatrick violated the terms of his bail by briefly traveling to Windsor, Ontario, where he met with Windsor mayor Eddie Francis concerning a deal to have the city of Windsor take over operational control of the Detroit-Windsor Tunnel in exchange for a $75 million loan. As a result, on August 7, 2008, Kilpatrick was remanded to spend a night in the Wayne County Jail. It was the first time in history that a sitting Detroit mayor had been ordered to jail. In issuing the order, Chief Judge Ronald Giles stated that he could not treat the mayor differently from "John Six-Pack." On August 8, 2008, after arguments on Kilpatrick's behalf by attorneys Jim Parkman and Jim Thomas, Judge Thomas Jackson reversed the remand order and permitted Kilpatrick to be released on posting a $50,000 cash bond and the further condition that the mayor not travel, and wear an electronic tracking device.

The same day Kilpatrick was released under the second bail agreement, Michigan Attorney General Mike Cox announced that two new felony counts had been filed against the mayor for assaulting or interfering with a law officer. The new charges arose out of allegations that Kilpatrick on July 24, 2008, shoved two Wayne County Sheriff's Deputies who were attempting to serve a subpoena on Bobby Ferguson, a Kilpatrick ally, and a potential witness in the mayor's then-upcoming perjury trial.

=== Resignation from mayoralty ===
On September 4, 2008, Kilpatrick announced his resignation as mayor, effective September 18, and pleaded guilty to two felony counts of obstruction of justice and pleaded no contest to assaulting the deputy.

In the separate assault case, he pleaded no contest to one felony count of assaulting and obstructing a police officer in exchange for a second assault charge being dropped. This deal also required his resignation and 120 days in jail, to be served concurrently with his jail time for the perjury counts. Kilpatrick was sentenced on October 28, 2008. The judge ordered that Kilpatrick not be given an opportunity for early release, but instead serve the entire 120 days in jail.

Detroit City Council President Kenneth Cockrel, Jr. replaced Kilpatrick as mayor at 12:01 a.m. September 19, 2008.

=== First sentencing ===
Judge David Groner sentenced Kilpatrick to four months in jail on October 28, 2008, calling him "arrogant and defiant" and questioning the sincerity of a guilty plea that ended his career at City Hall. The punishment was part of a plea agreement worked out a month earlier. "When someone gets 120 days in jail, they should get 120 days in jail," Groner said. Kilpatrick also was given a 120-day concurrent sentence for assaulting a sheriff's officer who was trying to deliver a subpoena in July. He was seen smirking, laughing, and even calling the sentencing a "joke".

Wayne County Sheriff Warren Evans said that they take 40,000 prisoners into the prison annually, but that Kilpatrick would be kept separate from the general population and "won't be treated any worse or any better than other prisoners." He was housed in a secured, 15 feet by 10 feet cell with a bed, chair, toilet and a shower, spending approximately 23 hours a day there. At 12:35 a.m. on Tuesday, February 3, 2009, Kilpatrick left jail after serving 99 days. He boarded a privately chartered Lear jet and landed in Texas that evening. He was supposed to join his family in a $3,000 per month rental house in Southlake, Texas.

Within a couple of weeks, Kilpatrick was hired by Covisint, a Texas subsidiary of Compuware, headquartered in Detroit. CEO of Compuware Peter Karmanos, Jr. was one of the parties who loaned large sums of money to Kilpatrick in late 2008. Kilpatrick was let go from Compuware in May 2010 after being sentenced to prison.

==== Restitution hearing ====
Kilpatrick claimed poverty to Judge David Groner. He said he only had $3,000 per month (later lowered to $6) for the restitution payments.

Judge Groner requested detailed financial records for Kilpatrick, his wife, their children, etc. By November 2009, Kilpatrick was on the stand in Detroit to explain his apparent poverty. He claimed to have no knowledge about who paid for his million-dollar home, Cadillac Escalades, and other lavish expenses. The former mayor also denied any knowledge of his wife's finances, or even whether she was employed. During this hearing, it was revealed that Peter Karmanos Jr., Roger Penske and other business leaders had provided substantial monies to the Kilpatricks to convince the mayor to resign his office and plead guilty. On January 20, 2010, Judge Groner ruled that Kilpatrick pay the sum of $300,000 to the city of Detroit within 90 days.

=== Second sentencing ===
On February 19, 2010, Kilpatrick missed a required restitution payment of $79,000. The court received only $14,000 on February 19 and another $21,175 on February 22. On February 23, Judge Groner approved a warrant for Kilpatrick and ruled in April that he had violated the terms of his probation. On May 25, 2010, Kilpatrick was sentenced to one and a half to five years with the Michigan Department of Corrections (with credit for 120 days previously served) for violation of probation, and was afterwards taken back into correctional custody. He was housed for fourteen days in the hospital unit of the state prisoner reception center. Kilpatrick was later housed in the Oaks Correctional Facility.

After he was indicted in federal court for additional crimes related to alleged misuse of his campaign funds, Kilpatrick lobbied for a transfer from the Oaks Correctional Facility. On July 11, 2010, he was transferred into the Federal Bureau of Prisons (BOP). Kilpatrick was incarcerated in the Milan Federal Prison near Milan, Michigan. He was released from federal custody on April 6, 2011. During his final 118 days of state imprisonment, Kilpatrick resided in the Cotton Correctional Facility. Kilpatrick was released on parole on August 2, 2011. In August 2011 the court ordered Kilpatrick to pay for his incarceration costs.

=== Second criminal trial and conviction ===
On December 14, 2010, Kilpatrick was again indicted on new corruption charges, in what a federal prosecutor called a "pattern of extortion, bribery and fraud" by some of the city's most prominent officials. His father, Bernard Kilpatrick, was also indicted, as was contractor Bobby Ferguson; Kilpatrick's aide, Derrick Miller; and Detroit water department chief Victor Mercado. The original 38-charge indictment listed allegations of 13 fraudulent schemes in awarding contracts in the city's Department of Water and Sewerage, with pocketed kickbacks of nearly $1,000,000. He was arraigned on January 10, 2011, on charges in the 89-page indictment. Federal prosecuting attorneys proposed a trial date in January 2012, but defense attorneys asked for a trial date in the summer of 2012.

Opening statements in the trial began on September 21, 2012. Prosecutors soon brought forth a large number of witnesses who gave damaging testimony. Mercado took a plea deal while the trial was in progress. On March 11, 2013, in spite of a vigorous defense that cost taxpayers more than a million dollars, Kilpatrick was found guilty by a jury on two dozen counts including those for racketeering, extortion, mail fraud, and tax evasion, among others. Shortly after conviction, speaking about Kilpatrick, Judge Nancy Edmunds ruled in favor of remand saying "detention is required in his circumstance".

He was sentenced to 28 years in prison on October 10, 2013. Kilpatrick, Federal Bureau of Prisons Register #44678-039, was serving his sentence at Federal Correctional Institution, Oakdale, a low-security prison in Oakdale, Louisiana. There is no parole in the federal prison system. However, with time off for good behavior, his earliest possible release date was August 1, 2037—when he would be 67 years old.

Mercado pleaded guilty to one count of conspiracy, Bobby Ferguson was sentenced to 21 years in prison, Derrick Miller pleaded guilty to tax evasion and was sentenced to three years supervision, the first year in a halfway house. Bernard Kilpatrick was sentenced to 15 months in prison. Emma Bell received two years probation and was fined $330,000 in back taxes as part of a plea deal where she testified that she frequently handed Kilpatrick large amounts of cash skimmed from campaign accounts.

First Independence Bank, used by Kilpatrick and Ferguson, was fined $250,000 for failing to follow anti-money-laundering regulations. 14 companies were suspended from bidding on contracts with the water department in the wake of the scandal. Inland Waters Pollution Control Inc. paid $4.5 million in the settlement of a lawsuit over their involvement with Kilpatrick, Ferguson and the Detroit Water Board. Lakeshore TolTest Corp. reached a $5 million settlement with the Water Board to avoid litigation.

In August 2015, the United States Court of Appeals for the Sixth Circuit upheld his convictions but ordered that the amount of restitution be recalculated. In June 2016, the U.S. Supreme Court denied his appeal.

In June 2018 Kilpatrick began seeking a pardon from President Donald Trump. His application was opposed by the U.S. Attorney's Office for southeast Michigan. Restitution claims and other civil lawsuits accumulated claimed $10 million in debts, for which Kilpatrick is responsible. Kilpatrick has no assets to settle these claims.

=== Commutation of sentence ===
On January 20, 2021, President Donald Trump commuted Kilpatrick's sentence with less than 12 hours remaining before the end of his first non-consecutive term. The White House statement on the commutation of Kilpatrick reads: "Mr. Kilpatrick has served approximately 7 years in prison for his role in a racketeering and bribery scheme while he held public office. During his incarceration, Mr. Kilpatrick has taught public speaking classes and has led Bible Study groups with his fellow inmates."

President Trump's commutation allowed Kilpatrick to gain release 20 years early, though it did not vacate his conviction. The commutation left in place the almost $4.8 million in restitution and the three-year probation. Kilpatrick will not be able to run for office in Michigan until 2033 as a felon is excluded from politics for 20 years after conviction under Michigan law.

== Other post-mayoral legal developments ==
In 2012, the Securities and Exchange Commission charged Kilpatrick and former city treasurer Jeffrey W. Beasley for having received $180,000 in travel, hotel rooms, and gifts from a company seeking investments from the city pension fund. Chauncey C. Mayfield and his company were also brought before administrative proceedings. The company received a $117 million investment in a real estate investment trust that it controlled. MayfieldGentry proceeded to misappropriate $3.1 million from the pension fund which was revealed during the influence peddling investigation. Mayfield pleaded guilty in 2013. The case was scheduled for June 2014.

According to The Detroit News (June 24, 2010), Kilpatrick, his father Bernard, and the Kilpatrick Civic Fund may have been important figures in the sludge hauling contract that saw city council president Monica Conyers (wife of Rep. John Conyers) and her chief of staff Sam Riddle convicted for conspiracy and bribery. "Kilpatrick and his father also figured, but have not been charged, in evidence surrounding a bribery-tainted, $1.2 billion sewage sludge contract the Detroit City Council awarded to Synagro Technologies Inc. in 2007. According to court documents and people familiar with the case, former Synagro official James Rosendall made large contributions to the Kilpatrick Civic Fund and gave Kilpatrick free flights to Las Vegas and Mackinac Island. Rosendall also told investigators he made cash payments to Bernard N. Kilpatrick, who told Rosendall he got him access to City Hall, records show." Rosendall and a Synagro consultant Rayford Jackson were also convicted of bribery.

== Memoir ==
Kilpatrick co-wrote a memoir about his life and political experiences titled Surrendered: The Rise, Fall, & Revelation of Kwame Kilpatrick. The book was originally scheduled for release on August 2, 2011, a date that would have just barely preceded his scheduled release from a Michigan prison. However, the publisher delayed the release to August 9, almost a week after Kilpatrick was paroled. Kilpatrick appeared at public events in Michigan and elsewhere to promote his book.

The public prosecutor in Wayne County, Michigan has asked the state courts to order the book's publisher, Tennessee-based Creative Publishing Consultants Inc., to remit Kilpatrick's share on the book's proceeds for payment toward Kilpatrick's criminal restitution and his cost of incarceration. On November 16, 2011, the publisher's attorney failed to appear at a hearing on the matter in Wayne County Circuit Court. A bench warrant was issued for the attorney, Jack Gritton, and was forwarded to authorities in Tennessee, where Gritton's practice is based.

== Post-release activities ==
Since release, Kilpatrick has worked as an "ordained minister, motivational speaker, consultant, and certified character coach". In April 2023, Kilpatrick was a guest speaker at the "Black Agenda Movement" conference, organized by YouTuber Michelle R. Kulczyk (Mechee X).

On June 15, 2024, Kilpatrick endorsed Donald Trump in the 2024 United States presidential election.

== Electoral history ==
- 2005 Race for Mayor (Detroit)
  - Kwame Kilpatrick (D) (incumbent), 53%
  - Freman Hendrix (D), 47%
- 2005 Race for Mayor (Detroit) (Primary Election)
  - Freman Hendrix (D), 45%
  - Kwame Kilpatrick (D) (incumbent), 34%
  - Sharon McPhail (D), 12%
  - Hansen Clarke (D), 8%
- 2001 Race for Mayor (Detroit)
  - Kwame Kilpatrick (D), 54%
  - Gil Hill (D), 46%

=== Affiliations ===
As a politician, Kilpatrick was a member of the Democratic Party.

Kilpatrick was a member of the Mayors Against Illegal Guns Coalition, a bi-partisan anti-gun group with a stated goal of "making the public safer by getting illegal guns off the streets." The Coalition was co-chaired by Mayor Thomas Menino of Boston and Michael Bloomberg of New York City. Following Kilpatrick's conviction in 2013 on federal charges, his membership status in the organization was initially not clear. As of September 2010, there had been no announcement of his resignation from Mayors Against Illegal Guns; however, by December 2012, he was no longer listed as a member.

== Personal life ==
=== Health ===
In July 2006, Kilpatrick was hospitalized and diagnosed with diverticulitis while in Houston, Texas. His personal physician indicated that Kilpatrick's condition may have been caused by a high-protein weight-loss diet.

== See also ==
- Barbara L. McQuade, U.S. attorney who obtained a large number of indictments against Kilpatrick.
- Louis Miriani, former mayor of Detroit
- Richard Reading, former mayor of Detroit
- List of 2010s American state and local politicians convicted of crimes

Michigan House of Representatives
Preceded by Carolyn Cheeks Kilpatrick	Member of the Michigan House of Representatives from the 9th district 1997–2002	Succeeded by Fred Durhal Jr.
Preceded by Michael J. Hanley	Minority Leader of the Michigan House of Representatives; 2001–2002	Succeeded by Buzz Thomas
Political offices
Preceded by Dennis Archer	Mayor of Detroit; 2002–2008	Succeeded by Kenneth Cockrel, Jr.
