= Christine Beatty =

American political advisor (born 1970)

Christine Rowland Beatty (born May 1970) served as the Chief of Staff from 2002 to 2008 to Detroit Mayor Kwame Kilpatrick.

In January 2008, Beatty resigned amid an emerging political sex scandal and criminal charges of perjury related to a whistleblower trial for lying under oath about her extramarital affair with Kilpatrick. Beatty and Kilpatrick sought to mislead jurors when they testified that they did not fire Deputy Police Chief Gary Brown. Kilpatrick pleaded guilty September 4, 2008, to two felony obstruction of justice charges, and was sentenced to four months in jail on October 28, 2008. Beatty was offered several plea bargains from Wayne County Prosecutor Kym Worthy—one for as little as 150 days of prison time—but she refused. Beatty was a respondent in a $25,000 settled slander lawsuit initiated by two police officers.

On December 1, 2008, Beatty agreed to plead guilty to two felony counts, serve 120 days in jail, pay $100,000 in restitution, and be on probation for five years. She was sentenced and began her jail term on January 6, 2009.

== Personal life ==
Beatty, who was born Christine L. Rowland, graduated from Cass Tech High School and was voted its "most-popular student" in 1988 and was a Majorette. She graduated with a bachelor's degree from Howard University and a master's degree from Wayne State University.

She married Lou Beatty and they have two children. The marriage ended in divorce in 2006. Beatty suspended her status as a student of Wayne State University Law School as a condition of her probation. She declared bankruptcy in 2013, though this did not discharge the restitution she owed the city of Detroit.

== Legal troubles ==
=== Slander suit ===
Beatty was named in a slander lawsuit, along with Kwame Kilpatrick and police chief Ella Bully-Cummings, brought about by two police officers that claimed to have been slandered in the media by the trio.

The lawsuit stemmed from a 2004 incident in which the two police officers pulled Beatty over for speeding. The officers claimed that Beatty was irate at being stopped and bluntly asked the officers, "Do you know who the fuck I am?" when the officers came to the vehicle. The officers alleged that, while stopped, Beatty called Bully-Cummings to have the officers called off, which they were ordered to do. When reports of the incident started to surface in the media, Bully-Cummings said the officers harassed Beatty, and Kilpatrick said the stop "looked like a setup".

The parties in the lawsuit entered into mediation which recommended a settlement of $25,000 which was rejected twice by the Detroit City Council.

The attorney for the officers said "The mayor has been exposed and I may want more money for my clients now," after it was revealed through text messages that Kilpatrick and Beatty were involved in a sexual relationship that both denied under oath.

The lawsuit was settled for $25,000 and the attorney for the officers said of the officers,"They don't want to be embroiled in this whole [text messaging] scandal."

=== Text-messaging scandal ===
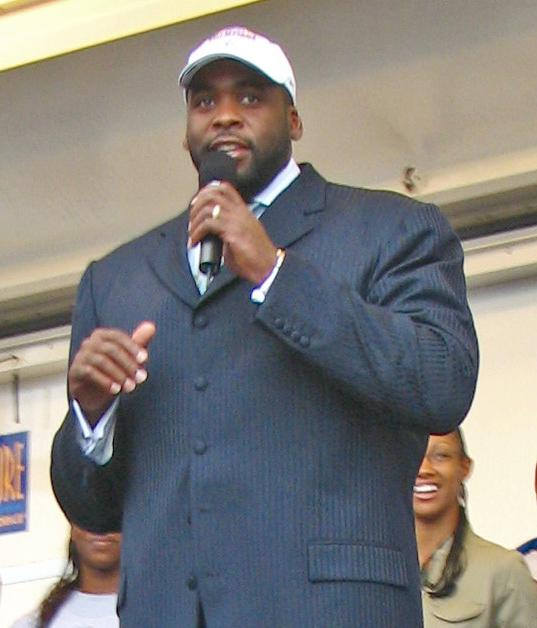
Kwame Kilpatrick

In January 2008, The Detroit Free Press examined more than 14,000 text messages exchanged between Beatty and Kilpatrick on their city issued SkyTel pagers between September–October 2002 and April–May 2003. The dates are of importance because they encompass the time periods of the alleged Manoogian Mansion party and the ouster of Gary Brown respectively.

Beatty and Kilpatrick, both married to other people at the time, did discuss city business. However, many of the series of messages described not a professional relationship but an extramarital sexual relationship between the two, often in graphic detail. The text messages further described their use of city funds to arrange romantic getaways, their fears of being caught by the mayor's police protection unit, and evidence the pair conspired to fire Detroit Deputy Police Chief Gary Brown.

In an August 2007 trial, Kilpatrick and Beatty both denied that they had a sexual relationship or that they fired Brown while under oath.

Beatty resigned as mayoral chief of staff stating "I believe that it is clear I can no longer effectively carry out the duties of chief of staff." She did not indicate if she would resign from her position on the Detroit Medical Center board of directors.

==== Criminal investigation and charges ====
Wayne County Prosecutor Kym Worthy began an investigation of perjury charges after the Detroit Free Press revealed the existence of text messages which supported allegations that Kilpatrick and Beatty lied under oath about an extramarital affair during a lawsuit brought by Detroit police officers.

The investigation ended with Beatty being charged with seven felonies consisting of perjury, conspiracy to obstruct justice, misconduct in office and obstruction of justice. The charges carry a maximum sentence of five to fifteen years in prison.

==== Conviction, sentencing, and jail time ====
On December 1, 2008, Beatty admitted lying under oath and was sentenced to 120 days in jail. She was also to be on probation for five years and, during that time, had to reimburse the city of Detroit $100,000, if she was capable of doing so. On January 6, 2009, she began her sentence at the Wayne County Jail.

On March 16, 2009, Beatty was released from Wayne County Jail having served 69 days of her sentence.
