= Manoogian Mansion =

Building in Detroit, Michigan, United States

Coordinates: 42°21′13.4″N 82°58′54.1″W

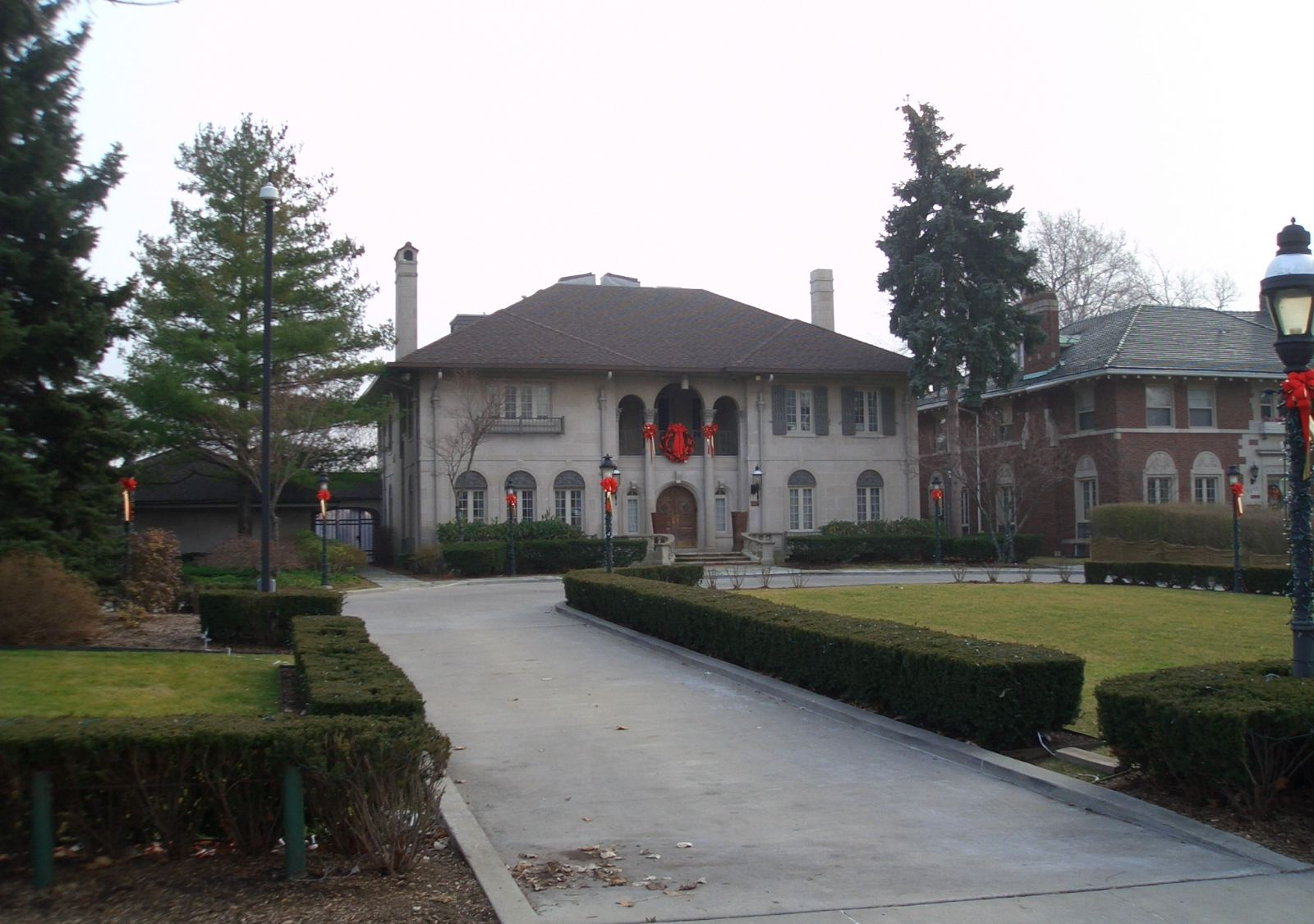
The Manoogian Mansion in 2008.

The Manoogian Mansion is the official residence of the Mayor of Detroit, Michigan. It is located at 9240 Dwight Street in the Berry Subdivision Historic District, on the city's east side, backing up to the Detroit River.

== History ==
The mansion was built in 1928 at the cost of US$300,000 (equivalent to $5,493,605 in 2024). The original owner lost the home during the Great Depression and it sat vacant until Alex Manoogian, founder of the Masco company, purchased the home at an auction in 1939 for a mere $25,000 ($0.57 million in 2024). In 1966, Manoogian donated the mansion to the City of Detroit. Jerry Cavanagh and his family became the first mayoral family to occupy the mansion.

In late 2002 rumors began surfacing that Mayor Kwame Kilpatrick had thrown an excessive party there. After defeating Kenneth Cockrel, Jr. in a special election in 2009 following Kilpatrick's resignation, new mayor Dave Bing did not immediately move into the mansion because of city budget issues. Cockrel likewise had not moved into the mansion. Bing moved into the mansion in 2010. He considered altering the mansion's name to remove association with the rumored Kilpatrick partying incident.

== Location and composition ==
The 4,000-square-foot (370 m^{2}) Manoogian Mansion is located along the Detroit River, several miles east of Downtown Detroit. The Associated Press stated that it is in "a small, older subdivision". As of 2010 the maintenance cost was US$116,000 (equivalent to $167,264 in 2024) per year.

=== Architecture ===
The Manoogian Mansion has Mediterranean Revival-Spanish Colonial Revival Style architecture with a Mission Revival Style influence including a terra-cotta tile roof. It has approximately 4,000 square feet (370 m^{2}). The physical layout of the house is dominated by walls of windows – bowed windows, arched windows, leaded windows – that let light stream in and open onto views of the grounds and the Detroit River. The downstairs contains three sunrooms facing south and the river. There are 15 rooms in all, including a large living room, library, kitchen and two dining rooms: a formal room and a more casual one that overlooks the river. It has four bedrooms, plus two small bedrooms for servants. There are three full baths, a servants' bath and two half-baths. The Berry Historic Subdivision Historic District has the former homes of several prominent Detroit residents, including John and Frederic Ford, Arthur Clamage, and John Kay of Wright-Kay Jewelers. Notable architects who designed for the subdivision included John M. Donaldson and Henry J. Meier, A. C. Varney, Roland Geis and Robert O. Derrick.

== See also ==
- Manoogian Mansion party and the murder of Tamara Greene
