= Ella Bully-Cummings =

American lawyer

Ella M. Bully-Cummings
- Born: 1958 (age 67–68); Kanagawa Prefecture, Japan
- Police career
- Country: United States
- Allegiance: State of Michigan
- Department: Detroit Police Department
- Service years: 1977–2008
- Rank: Sworn in as an officer (1977); Sergeant (1987); Lieutenant (1993); Inspector (1995); Commander (1998); Assistant chief (2002); Chief of police (2003–2008)

Ella M. Bully-Cummings (born 1958) is an American police officer who served as the chief of the Detroit Police Department from 2003 to 2008.

== Early life and education ==
Bully-Cummings was born in Japan, the second-oldest of eight children of an African American repairman and a Japanese-American chef. Her parents met when her father was serving in the U.S. Army as part of the American Occupation forces. The family settled in Detroit, her Mississippi-born father's adopted hometown, before she was two years old.

While in high school she worked at a movie theater, and between graduating from high school and going into the police force in 1977 she worked as an administrative assistant at Redford High School and sold real estate.

She attended Henry Ford Junior High School in Highland Park, Michigan, and is a graduate of Cass Technical High School. Bully-Cummings helped her parents pay for her siblings' education through early years on the police force. She went to college herself while still serving on the police force after helping to pay for five of her siblings. In December 1993 Bully-Cummings graduated with honors from Madonna University with a bachelor's degree in public administration. She then went on to graduate cum laude from Michigan State University College of Law with a J.D. in January 1998 and was sworn into the State Bar of Michigan in May 1998.

== Career ==
Bully-Cummings entered the police academy in 1977. In the mid-1980s she worked for the Detroit Free Press as a receptionist, secretary, and administrative assistant when hundreds of police officers were laid-off due to budget cuts. Back to the force, she rose to the rank of sergeant in 1987. She continued her rise in the department by making lieutenant in 1993 and commander in 1998.

In July 1999 retired from the department to become a staff attorney first at Miller, Canfield, Paddock and Stone PLC, then at Foley & Lardner, and finally back at Miller Canfield. She represented management in employment cases that involved federal and state discrimination.

In 2002 she was called back into service by Mayor Kwame Kilpatrick as an Assistant Chief of Police, the first female appointed to assistant chief position in Detroit. She was charged with overseeing Management Services, Training, Personnel, Science and Technology, and Risk Management bureaus, collectively called the "Administrative Portfolio".

After the resignation of Chief Jerry Oliver in 2003, Bully-Cummings was appointed as interim chief. She became permanent in 2004.

Under her leadership, in 2004, the Detroit Police Department realized the greatest reduction in major crimes in 41 years, and a record reduction of 15.2% in violent crimes.

The Detroit Police were under the supervision of US District Judge Julian Abele Cook Jr. until 2008 per a US Justice Department investigation.

Bully-Cummings was held in contempt of court in late 2005 for not reinstating four inspectors and three commanders, who were let go as a part of the restructuring of the police department to save money. A total of 150 police personnel were laid off.

=== Slander suit ===
Mayor Kilpatrick, his Chief of Staff Christine Beatty and Bully-Cummings were named in a lawsuit brought about by Detroit Police officers Zack Weishuhn and Patrick Tomsic, who claimed that they were slandered in the media by city officials.

The lawsuit stemmed from a 2004 incident in which the two police officers pulled Beatty over for speeding. The officers claimed that Beatty was irate at being stopped and bluntly asked the officers, "Do you know who the fuck I am?" when the officers came to the vehicle. The officers alleged that, while stopped, Beatty called Bully-Cummings to have the officers called off, which they were ordered to do. When reports of the incident started to surface in the media, Bully-Cummings said the officers harassed Beatty, and Kilpatrick said the stop "looked like a setup".

As part of a settlement, the Detroit City Council voted to approve a $25,000 mediation recommendation to the two officers in February 2008, after previously rejecting the settlement twice. The offer was accepted.

On September 4, 2008, Bully-Cummings announced her retirement, minutes after Kilpatrick pleaded guilty to two counts of perjury and resigned from office as part of a plea deal. She offered to assist her successor in transitioning to the duties of Police Chief if asked to do so.

== Awards and recognition ==
Bully-Cummings is a 2005 recipient of the General Motors and Black Entertainment Television’s "History Maker in the Making" Award, and a Lifetime Achievement Award from the National Center for Women and Policing.

== Personal life ==
Bully-Cummings is married to Attorney William Cummings, a retired Detroit police commander. She was previously married to former Wayne County Sheriff and former Detroit Police Chief Warren Evans.
