= Morgan Quitno Press =

American research and publishing company

Morgan Quitno Press is a research and publishing company founded in 1989 and based in Lawrence, Kansas. The company compiled annual reference books of US state and city statistics. Its primary volumes included State Rankings, Health Care State Rankings, Education State Rankings, Crime State Rankings, City Crime Rankings, and State Trends. In 2007, Morgan Quitno Press was acquired by CQ Press, a division of Congressional Quarterly Inc. CQ Press later was acquired by Sage Publications which incorporated the Morgan Quitno statistics into its Sage Stats database.

== Products ==
- State Rankings – comprehensive livability of each State. Annual Most Livable State Award is given to No. 1 State in this ranking.
- Health Care State Ranking – limited to and more detailed in health care. No. 1 State is awarded annual Healthiest State Award each year.
- Crime State Rankings – limited to and more detailed in crime. Best State is awarded annual Safest State Award while worst State is tabbed as Most Dangerous State.
- Education State Rankings – limited to and more detailed in K-12 education. Best State is awarded annual Smartest State Award.
- City Crime Rankings – city and metro area version of Crime State Rankings mentioned above. Safest City, Safest Metro, Most Dangerous City, and Most Dangerous Metro are ranked based on the data on this rankings.
- State Trends – shows trend of each State data. Most Improved State decided based on the data. Last edition was in 2007.

== America's safest (most dangerous) cities ==
=== Evaluated cities and metro areas ===
- Cities assessed – population of 75,000+
- Metro areas assessed – all, as defined by US Census Bureau (no minimum population)

=== Assessed crimes ===
- murder
- rape
- robbery
- assault
- burglary
- automobile theft

=== Methodology ===
1. Calculate crime rate (number of cases per pop. 100,000) of each 6 crimes based on previous year's FBI data.
2. Compare these rates with U.S. average
3. Calculate Crime Index based on Morgan Quitno's equation.
4. Rank cities and metros by their Crime Index.

== Criticism ==
The FBI recommends against use of its crime statistics for directly comparing cities as Morgan Quitno does in its "Most Dangerous Cities" rankings. This is due to the many factors that influence crime, such as population density and the degree of urbanization, modes of transportation of highway system, economic conditions, and citizens' attitudes toward crime.

Cities of Illinois are not included in this ranking, due to a disparity in the way Illinois State police and the FBI report rape cases. Other cities may be excluded because of lack of some data.

In October 2007 the American Society of Criminology, the U.S. Conference of Mayors, and the Federal Bureau of Investigation asked the publisher to reconsider promotion of the book – specifically, "their inaccurate and inflammatory press release labeling cities as 'safest' and 'most dangerous'" – because the rankings are "baseless and damaging." In November 2007 the executive board of the American Society of Criminology (ASC) approved a resolution opposing the development of city crime rankings from FBI Uniform Crime Reports (UCRs). The resolution states,

These rankings represent an irresponsible misuse of the data and do groundless harm to many communities [and] work against a key goal of our society, which is a better understanding of crime-related issues by both scientists and the public.

The U.S. Conference of Mayors criticized the "Most Dangerous Cities" list, saying the annual city-by-city crime rankings are "distorted and damaging to cities' reputations." In addition, it noted specific flaws in the methodology, for instance, its weighting of murder as the same as auto theft.

In addition, the Conference criticized Quitno's "Most Dangerous Cities" ranking because it did not adjust rankings of cities with wide-area city limits, such as Houston and Jacksonville, compared to cities with smaller city territory, such as St. Louis and Atlanta. Houston's apparent city crime statistics, for instance, are diluted because of lower crime in affluent areas within its broad city limits, whereas almost all the low-crime, affluent areas of the St. Louis metropolitan area are outside its much smaller city limits. The city area constitutes only 12.5% of its metro area. If data from adjacent suburbs were included in assessing crime in St. Louis city, its ranking would fall far down the dangerous cities list, with no actual change in number of individual crimes or personal safety. Metro area, rather than city, rankings include all suburbs for all MSAs, and therefore could be considered more valid.

== See also ==
- United States cities by crime rate
