= Camp Lehman =

Prison in Michigan, US

Camp Lehman Correctional Facility
- Location: Grayling, Michigan
- Status: CLOSED
- Security class: Minimum (Level I)
- Capacity: 582
- Opened: 1948
- Closed: October 31, 2009
- Managed by: Michigan Department of Corrections
- Director: Patricia L. Caruso

Camp Lehman was a minimum security prison camp operated by the Michigan Department of Corrections Correctional Facilities Administration (CFA), 10 miles (16 km) north of Grayling located in Crawford County, Michigan; under the administrative control of the Pugsley Correctional Facility in Kingsley, Michigan.

Camp Lehman sat on 19 acres (77,000 m^{2}) of land donated by the Michigan Department of Natural Resources and housed 582 adult male prisoners. The camp had prisoner public works and gate pass assignments.

== History ==
Camp Lehman was named after Ray Lehman, a District Supervisor of Paroles who was killed in World War II in February 1943.

Camp Lehman was established as one of the original Honor system camps when the Corrections Conservation Prison Camp Program was started in 1948 and housed minimum security adult male prisoners. The purpose of the Corrections Conservation Prison Camp Program was twofold. Various conservation projects under the direction of the Conservation Department (now the Michigan Department of Natural Resources or DNR) needed to be manned and prisoners provided an inexpensive and reliable source of labor. The Corrections Camp Program was granted permission to use old Civilian Conservation Corps (CCC) camps in exchange for prisoners to be used on these conservation projects. The Conservation Department provided employees to supervise these prisoners and vehicles to transport the prisoners to and from the assignments.

When the old buildings of the CCC became unsuitable to house prisoners, a new building (renamed Superior unit, in 1986) was constructed on the site where the facility is now located. This building was built in 1963-64 to accommodate 80 prisoners and included all necessary functions of a correctional facility within one building. Over the years the facility added other buildings to accommodate growth of the prisoner population. The largest expansion of the Camp was in 1986 when three new eighty single-prisoner-room housing units named Michigan unit, Huron unit, Erie unit, were added.

Also added at that time an activity building (Ontario unit) which primarily served as an activity/visiting room. Upon the completion of the new housing units the camp housed 342 prisoners. The housing units and activity building were named after the Great Lakes (Superior, Michigan, Huron, Erie, and Ontario), that surround Michigan. In 1987 a 12-foot (3.7 m) high security fence was constructed. This security fence was enhanced in 1999 and 2000 to electronically detect any suspicious movement on the fence.

On October 1, 1997, the Corrections Camp Program was disbanded and each remaining camp became the responsibility of the closest correctional facility. Camp Lehman’s parent facility was the Standish Maximum Correctional Facility in Standish, Michigan; until July 2009, when the camp became the responsibility of the Pugsley Correctional Facility Kingsley, Michigan. In June 2003, the prisoner population increased to 582 prisoners by double bunking each of the three eighty room housing units. Superior unit housed 102 prisoners; Michigan, Huron, and Erie units each housed 160 prisoners.

In six decades Camp Lehman saw many changes. Originally the Camp was only to serve to provide labor for the Conservation Department but evolved into a correctional facility with a multitude of programs and functions. Camp Lehman provided labor to various public authorities including the Michigan Department of Natural Resources and the Michigan Department of Military Affairs at Camp Grayling Army National Guard Training Site. Prisoners were compensated for their labor and the State of Michigan was reimbursed for the cost of operating the program by the various public entities that utilized the program. As of October 1, 2007 the Camp had 5 prisoner work crews.

The number of employees increased over the years according to the number of prisoners housed and the increase in programs and functions. In 1977, a total of 15 employees operated the Camp, of which 11 were custody and security staff. In October 2007, the camp employed 107 employees of which 67 were custody and security staff until its closure in October 2009.

On February 1, 2009, Camp Lehman became a tobacco-free facility. The possession and use of tobacco products by prisoners, staff, and the general public was prohibited.

On June 5, 2009, Regional Prison Administrator Jerri Ann Sherry arrived at Camp Lehman to announce to the staff that after more than sixty years of service to the People of the State of Michigan, Camp Lehman would be closed prior to November 1, 2009. She also announced in addition to Camp Lehman closing the other four remaining prison camps: Camp Cusino in Shingleton, Camp Kitwen in Painsedale, Camp Ottawa in Iron River, and Camp White Lake in White Lake Township would also be closed. These closures signaled an end to the Corrections Camp Program.

Also, on June 5, 2009, Governor Jennifer Granholm released a statement to the media to announce the State of Michigan would be closing the Hiawatha Correctional Facility, in Kincheloe; the Muskegon Correctional Facility, in Muskegon, MI; and the Standish Maximum Correctional Facility before November 1, 2009.

The last of the prisoners were transferred to other facilities on Friday, October 30, 2009.

Camp Lehman closed on October 31, 2009. Camp Lehman was the final prison camp opened in Michigan; and with its closure marked the end of the Corrections Camp Program in the State of Michigan.

== Programs and services ==
Camp Lehman provided the following prisoner programs: Adult Basic Education; General Education Development; a pre-release program; substance abuse treatment; Alcoholics Anonymous & Narcotics Anonymous; Assaultive Offender Therapy; Thinking for A Change classes; parenting classes; smoking cessation classes; and group counseling and had a law library that provided services for prisoners from throughout Michigan who were housed in Camps.

The camp had a Health Care Unit that provided prisoners access to a physician assistant, nursing, dental and psychological services.

Recreation for the prisoners included a gymnasium; softball field; outdoor basketball courts; outdoor handball court; weight pavilion; music room; in-room-hobbycraft; walking/running track; and exercise stations.

Equipment for these leisure-time activities was provided by the Prisoner Benefit Fund which was funded directly from the prisoner store and other prisoner fundraising functions.

Camp Lehman also provided a variety of religious services overseen by the Prison Chaplain at the Pugsley Correctional Facility and aided by approved religious volunteer groups from the local community.

== See also ==
- List of Michigan state prisons
