= St. Louis Correctional Facility =

Prison in St. Louis, Michigan, United States

St. Louis Correctional Facility (SLF)
- Interactive map of St. Louis Correctional Facility (SLF)
- Location: St. Louis, Michigan; 43.41571°N 84.58803°W
- Status: Open
- Security class: Level IV
- Opened: 1999
- Managed by: Michigan Department of Corrections
- Warden: John Christiansen
- Website: Official website

St. Louis Correctional Facility (SLF) is a prison located in Saint Louis, Michigan. The facility is operated by the Michigan Department of Corrections.

== Facility ==
The prison was opened in 1999 and has seven housing units, occupying 67 acres (27 ha), used for Michigan Department of Corrections male prisoners 18 years of age and older. Six of the housing units are used by the general prison population, one of which is an Adaptive Skills Residential Program (ASRP) Unit. There is also one housing unit, which houses up to 96 prisoners, that is used for segregating inmates from the general prison population. Onsite facilities provide for food service, health care, facility maintenance, storage, and prison administration.

== Security ==
The facility is surrounded by double chain link fences with razor-ribbon wire and guard towers. Electronic detection systems, closed-circuit television (CCTV), and patrol vehicles are also utilized to maintain perimeter security.

== Services ==
The facility offers libraries, barbering, handicrafts, education programs, substance-abuse treatment, psychotherapy, and religious services to the inmates. Onsite medical and dental care, provided by mini-clinics in each housing unit, is supplemented by local hospitals and the Duane L. Waters Hospital in Jackson, Michigan.

== See also ==
- List of Michigan state prisons
