= List of Michigan state prisons =

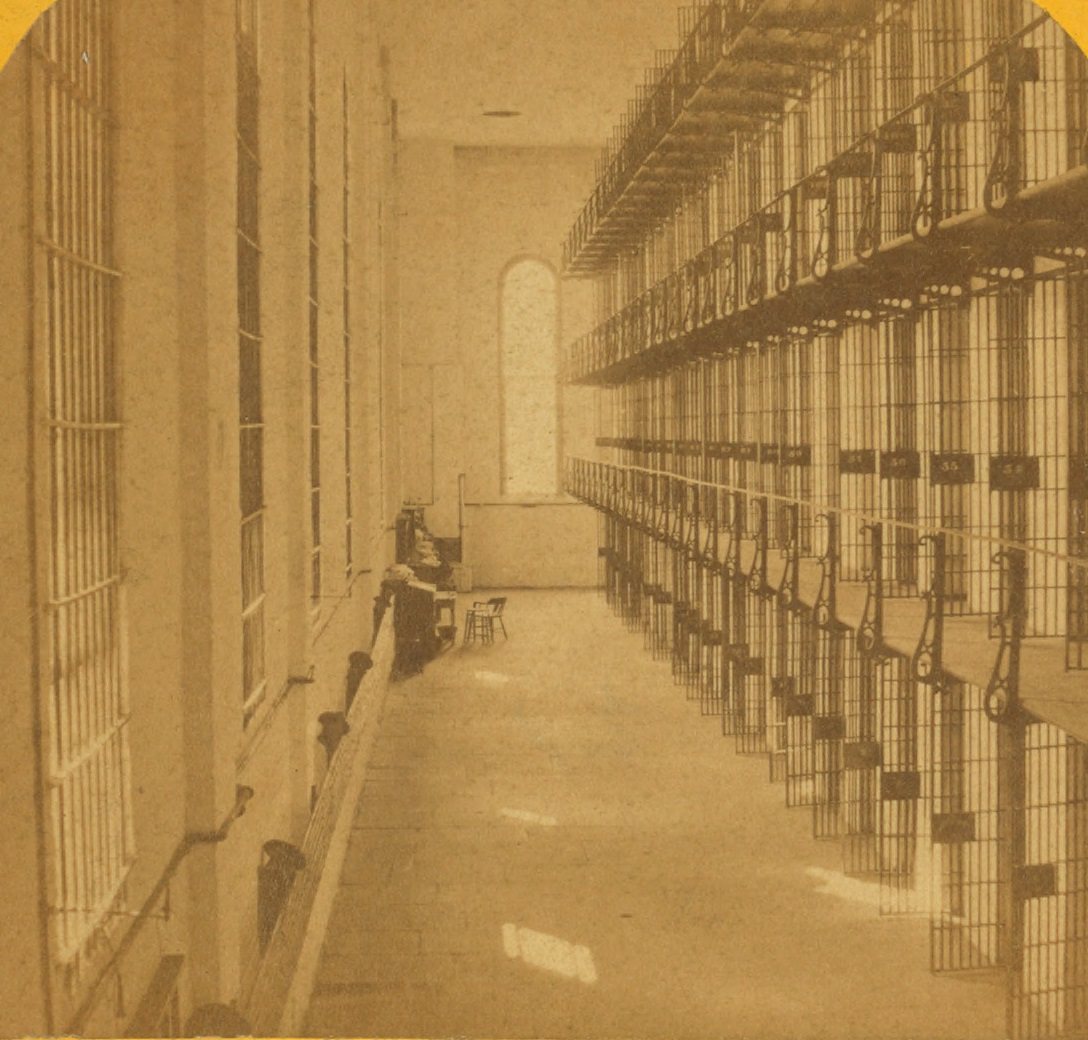
Detroit House of Corrections in the late 1800s

This is a list of current and former state prisons and minimum security prison camps in Michigan. It does not include federal prisons or county jails located in that State. All facilities not otherwise indicated are facilities for men.

Michigan State Prison (also called the Jackson Prison) was the first state prison, built in 1842. A larger prison building was built in 1926 and used until 2007. It was reorganized into separate prisons in 1988. The Detroit House of Corrections, built in 1861, was owned and run by the city of Detroit but originally accepted prisoners from throughout the state including women. The Detroit House of Corrections was transferred to the state in 1986, renamed to Western Wayne Correctional Facility, and became a women's facility for the rest of its tenure. It eventually closed in December 2004 and all inmates and staff were transferred to the Huron Valley Complex in Ypsilanti. The closure of the facility saved the state an estimated $23 million per year. The Michigan Asylum for Insane Criminals was built in Ionia in 1885 and treated prisoners and non-prisoners until 1972. It was renamed the Ionia State Hospital before being the Riverside Correctional Facility until Riverside was closed in 2007. The Marquette Branch Prison was built in 1889 for Upper Peninsula prisoners and the original building is still in use.

== In operation ==
As of September 2024, these facilities are open and in operation.

Facility	Code	Location	Notes
Alger Correctional Facility	LMF	Munising	
Baraga Correctional Facility	AMF	Baraga	
Bellamy Creek Correctional Facility	IBC	Ionia	Residential reentry in-reach facility
Carson City Correctional Facility	DRF	Carson City	
Central Michigan Correctional Facility	STF	St. Louis	Mid-Michigan Correctional Facility and Pine River Correctional Facility consolidated October 17, 2010 and now called Central Michigan
Charles Egeler Reception and Guidance Center	RGC	Jackson	
Chippewa Correctional Facility	URF	Kincheloe	
Cooper Street Correctional Facility	JCS	Jackson	Residential reentry in-reach facility
Detroit Detention Center	DDC	Detroit	Central lockup for Detroit
Detroit Reentry Center	DRC	Detroit	Residential reentry in-reach facility, formerly Ryan Correctional Facility
Earnest C. Brooks Correctional Facility	LRF	Muskegon	
G. Robert Cotton Correctional Facility	JCF	Jackson	
Gus Harrison Correctional Facility	ARF	Adrian	
Ionia Correctional Facility	ICF	Ionia	
Kinross Correctional Facility	KCF	Kincheloe	Originally known as Hiawatha Correctional Facility (HTF). Closed on August 8, 2009. Reopened and renamed in October 2015 after closure of original Kinross Correctional Facility.
Lakeland Correctional Facility	LCF	Coldwater	
Macomb Correctional Facility	MRF	New Haven	Residential reentry in-reach facility
Marquette Branch Prison	MBP	Marquette	
Muskegon Correctional Facility	MCF	Muskegon	Closed in 2009 and reopened October 2012
Newberry Correctional Facility	NCF	Newberry	
Oaks Correctional Facility	ECF	Eastlake	
Parnall Correctional Facility	SMT	Jackson	Residential reentry in-reach facility
Richard A. Handlon Correctional Facility	MTU	Ionia	
Saginaw Correctional Facility	SRF	Freeland	Residential reentry in-reach facility
St. Louis Correctional Facility	SLF	St. Louis	
Thumb Correctional Facility	TCF	Lapeer	
Women's Huron Valley Correctional Facility	WHV	Ypsilanti	Facility for females
Woodland Center Correctional Facility	WCC	Whitmore Lake	Mental health facility

== Closed ==
As of January 2014, these facilities are currently closed, or have been consolidated into other facilities.

=== Prisons ===
Facility	Code	Location	Status	Date closed	Notes
Boyer Road Correctional Facility	OTF	Carson City	Consolidated with Carson City Correctional Facility	2009 August 9	
Charles Egeler Reception and Guidance Center Annex	RGC	Jackson		2007 November 2	
Detroit House of Corrections		Wayne County	Closed. Converted to female facility, name changed to Western Wayne Correctional Facility, closed for good in 2004.	1986	Initially opened in 1861
Deerfield Correctional Facility	ITF	Ionia	Closed	2009 March 21	
Florence Crane Correctional Facility	ACF	Coldwater	Closed	2011 June 1	
Huron Valley Center	HVC	Ypsilanti	Closed	2004 December	Psychiatric hospital
Huron Valley Men's Complex	HVM	Ypsilanti	Closed to allow Robert Scott Correctional Facility to be consolidated with Women's Huron Valley Correctional Facility	2009	
Mid-Michigan Correctional Facility		St. Louis	Consolidated with Pine River Correctional Facility and now called Central Michigan Correctional Facility	2010 October 17	
Michigan State Prison		Jackson	Split into multiple units	1988	Built 1842
Michigan Youth Correctional Facility	YCF	Baldwin	Closed	2005 October 1	
Mound Correctional Facility	NRF	Detroit	Closed - now the Detroit Detention Center	2012 January 8	
Ojibway Correctional Facility	OCF	Marenisco	Closed	2018 December 1	
Parr Highway Correctional Facility	ATF	Adrian	Consolidated with Gus Harrison Correctional Facility	2009 August 9	
Pine River Correctional Facility		St. Louis	Consolidated with Mid-Michigan Correctional Facility and now called Central Michigan Correctional Facility	2010 October 17	
Riverside Correctional Facility	RCF	Ionia	Closed	2007 November 3	Mental health facility
Robert Scott Correctional Facility	SCF	Plymouth	Closed	2009 May	Facility for females
Southern Michigan Correctional Facility	JMF	Jackson	Closed	2007 November 17	
Special Alternative Incarceration Facility	SAI	Chelsea	Closed	2020 March 7	Minimum security "boot camp"
Standish Maximum Correctional Facility	SMF	Standish	Closed	2009 October 31	
State Prison of Southern Michigan	SMI	Jackson County	Closed	2002 January 4	Formerly Michigan State Prison
Straits Correctional Facility	KTF	Kincheloe	Consolidated with Chippewa Correctional Facility	2009 August 9	
Western Wayne Correctional Facility	WCF	Plymouth	Closed	2004 December 20	Facility for females

West Shoreline Correctional Facility closed on March 24, 2018

=== Minimum security prison camps ===
The minimum security prison camp program was ended in 2009 with the closures of Camp Cusino, Camp Kitwen, Camp Lehman, Camp Ottawa, and Camp White Lake.

Facility	Code	Location	Status	Date closed	Notes
Camp Branch	CDW	Coldwater	Closed	2009 February 21	
Camp Brighton	CBI	Pinckney	Closed	2007 March 24	Facility for females
Camp Cassidy Lake		Chelsea	Consolidated with Special Alternative Incarceration Facility		Residential reentry in-reach facility
Camp Cusino	CCU	Shingleton	Closed	2009 July 26	
Camp Kitwen	CKT	Painesdale	Closed	2009 July 26	
Camp Koehler	CKO	Kincheloe	Closed	2005 June 19	
Camp Lehman	CLE	Grayling	Closed	2009 October 31	
Camp Manistique	CMQ	Manistique	Closed	2007 October 20	
Camp Ottawa	COT	Iron River	Closed	2009 July 26	
Camp Pellston	CPL	Emmet County	Closed	2001 December 31	
Camp Sauble	CSA	Free Soil	Closed	2005 May 8	
Camp Tuscola	CTU	Caro	Closed	2005 June 2	Now a residential reentry in-reach center
Camp Valley	CVH	Ypsilanti	Closed	2009 February 2	Facility for females
Camp Waterloo		Waterloo State Recreation Area	Closed	2001 February 2	Facility for females; former CCC camp, WWII German POW camp
Camp White Lake	CWL	White Lake Township	Closed	2009 September 19	Facility for females

== See also ==
- Michigan Department of Corrections
- W.J. Maxey Boys Training School, for delinquent male youths, 12 to 21 years of age
