= Richard A. Handlon Correctional Facility =

Prison in Michigan, United States

Richard A. Handlon Facility
- Interactive map of Richard A. Handlon Facility
- Location: Ionia, Michigan; 42.982659°N 85.106475°W
- Status: Open
- Security class: Level II
- Opened: 1958
- Managed by: Michigan Department of Corrections
- Warden: DeWayne Burton
- Website: Official website

The Richard A. Handlon Correctional Facility (MTU), located in Ionia, Michigan, named after the prison's first warden, is a facility for male offenders who are, on average, younger than most other prisoners.

== Programming ==
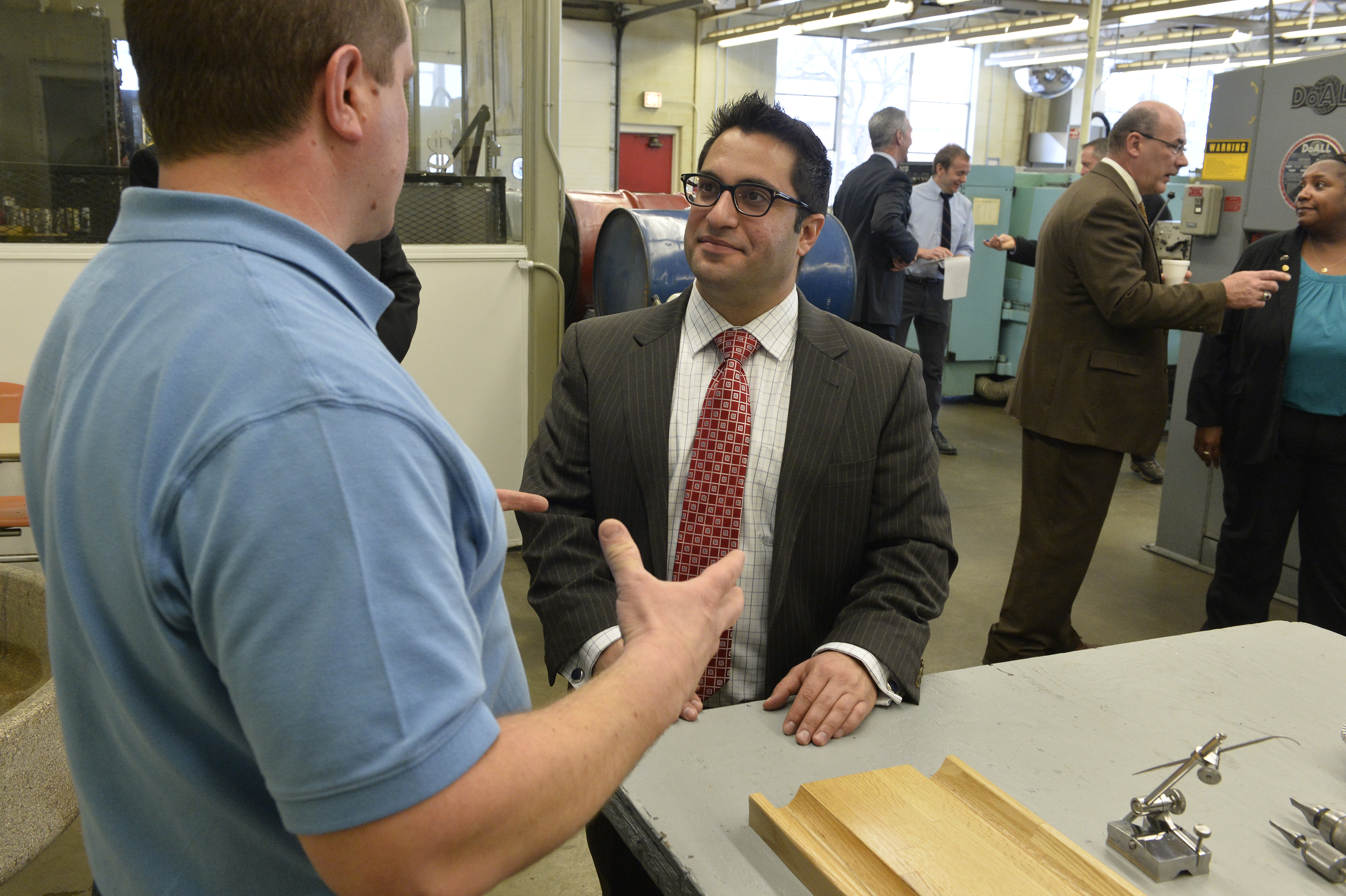
State Representative Klint Kesto talks with the welding teacher at the Richard A. Handlon Correctional Facility.

Six vocational courses are offered: building trades, machine shop, welding, horticulture, auto mechanics and auto body reconditioning. Adult Basic Education and General Education Development completion are offered.

Religious services, counseling and psychotherapy and other programs are offered. Job skills, life skills, and prevocational counseling are also offered, as well as a program for anger control.

Prisoners are provided on-site routine medical and dental care. Serious problems are treated at the department's Duane L. Waters Hospital in Jackson, and emergencies can be referred to a local hospital.

== Calvin Prison Initiative ==
Since fall of 2015, Calvin University and Calvin Theological Seminary, in partnership with Michigan Department of Corrections, has been offering a fully accredited undergraduate program to incarcerated individuals at the Richard A. Handlon Correctional Facility. The Calvin Prison Initiative (CPI), as it is called, consists of a variety of courses taught by Calvin University professors in accordance with the university's Christian liberal arts curriculum. A typical school year consists of eight to nine courses. After five years of coursework, CPI students graduate with a certificate in Faith and Community Leadership, a certificate in Liberal Arts and Sciences, and a Bachelor of Arts degree with double majors in Faith and Community Leadership and Human Services.

CPI accepts 25 male students annually from corrections facilities throughout Michigan on the basis of application. Applications are distributed to individuals at the discretion of the facility in which they reside. Aside from facility recommendation, applicants must also be people serving life sentences or with at least seven years remaining until they are eligible for parole. Prospective students must also have a GED or high school diploma, "[p]ossess high moral character and a desire to study and serve others," and "[m]eet conduct requirements set by the MDOC."

CPI has received overwhelmingly positive feedback from graduates and professors involved. In a 2022 organizational evaluation conducted by DataWise Consulting LLC, one CPI student explained, "I have been incarcerated [for over 40 years] and I have been involved in numerous academic, vocational, and religious programs in the MDOC. CPI is by far the BEST program I have participated in (in or out of prison). It is a program that gives prisoners the opportunity to rehabilitate his/her mind, body, and soul." Despite the "his/her" used by that CPI graduate, it is worth noting that the program is not open to female students, as Richard A. Handlon is a males only correctional facility (Michigan has only one correctional facility for female inmates,Women's Huron Valley Correctional Facility (WHV), presumably because of the much lower incarceration rate of females, which has a Vocational Villages Program from MDOC and a Bachelor in General Studies degree offered by Eastern Michigan University).

In that same 2022 report by DataWise, it is noted that there is conflict between the MDOC staff at Handlon and the CPI students and faculty, with one MDOC staffer suggesting that MDOC staff be offered CPI classes as a way to soften tensions with corrections officers who might feel that inmates are "receiving free college." Many others surveyed also recommended that training or courses be offered to MDOC staff or something be done to reconcile staff and students. The DataWise Report wrote that most comments to their survey from MDOC staff were positive, but "the negative comments are strongly worded, even venomous, a point to a critical need for improved relationships"(page 53). Others felt that growth of the program is hindered by MTU staff and MDOC, who they feel are not very invested in the program. This is perhaps in part because corrections staff have seen many programs like CPI fail over the years.

Despite this, the DataWise report found that 95% of their 150 survey respondents of CPI students, CPI graduates, CPI faculty, CPI staff, Calvin administration/staff, and MDOC staff agreed that "CPI helps students find ways to help others and give back to the community." People feel strongly that the program has significantly improved life at Handlon not just for CPI students. Relationships between inmates at the prison is thought to have improved and violence rates reduced.

== Security ==
A double fence, razor-ribbon wire and electronic detection systems make up the perimeter. A patrol vehicle enhances perimeter security.

== See also ==
- List of Michigan state prisons
