= Central Michigan Correctional Facility =

Prison in Michigan, United States

Central Michigan Correctional Facility (STF)
- Interactive map of Central Michigan Correctional Facility (STF)
- Location: St. Louis, Michigan; 43.41025°N 84.59774°W
- Status: Open
- Security class: Secure Level I
- Capacity: 2560
- Opened: 1990
- Managed by: Michigan Department of Corrections
- Director: Warden Gary Miniard
- Website: Official website

Central Michigan Correctional Facility (STF) is a Michigan prison for male Level I prisoners.

== History ==
The prison was opened in 1990 and was previously known as the Mid-Michigan Correctional Facility and Pine River Correctional Facility until they were consolidated on October 17, 2010.

== Facility ==
The Central Michigan Correctional Facility consists of eight housing buildings which provide sixteen separate housing units. Each housing unit consists of 7-8 bed open bays, with 140-160 prisoners. The housing units can hold 2400 Secure Level I prisoners, who are more easily managed within the facility (even though they may have committed violent crimes) than higher level prisoners. There are separate buildings for administration, foodservice, academic programs, maintenance in a warehouse, and prisoner services. The facility is capable of providing on-site routine medical and dental care. Serious medical problems are treated at Michigan Department of Corrections' department at Duane L. Waters Hospital in Jackson, and emergencies are treated by nearby hospitals.

=== Security ===
The facility is surrounded by two 12 feet (3.7 m) fences. The exterior fence has rolls of razor wire on the side and top. The interior fence is an electronically monitored non-lethal electric fence. The perimeter of the facility is also monitored electronically, with surveillance cameras, and with an armed personnel patrol.

== Program ==
The Central Michigan Correctional Facility offers several programs for prisoners, including pre-release preparation, recreation, psychological counseling, cognitive restructuring, substance-abuse treatment, and a variety of voluntary self-help programs. A vocational program offers education opportunities in the areas of custodial maintenance technology, business educational technology, horticulture, and building trades. An academic program offers classes in adult basic education and general education development. The facility also provides a general and law library, hobbycraft, religious services, and a barbershop.

== See also ==
- List of Michigan state prisons
