= Shelly Brooks =

American serial killer

- Born: January 22, 1969 (age 57); Detroit, Michigan, U.S.
- Convictions: First degree murder (2 counts); Assault with intent to commit murder First degree criminal sexual conduct
- Penalty: Life imprisonment

Details
- Victims: 7
- Span of crimes: 2001–2006
- Country: United States
- State: Michigan
- Date apprehended: June 26, 2006
- Imprisoned at: Kinross Correctional Facility, Kincheloe, Michigan

Shelly Andre Brooks (born January 22, 1969) is an American serial killer who murdered at least seven women in Detroit, Michigan, from 2001 to 2006. He is serving multiple life sentences without the possibility of parole.

== Early life ==
Brooks was born on January 22, 1969, in Detroit, Michigan, but later raised in Ann Arbor, around 40–50 miles from Detroit. His father neglected him, and when he was four, his mother left the family, leaving him in the hands of his grandparents. Brooks was reported to be angry at his mother throughout his childhood, though he never saw her again after she left the family. Throughout his early years, Brooks showed signs of low intelligence.

== Murders ==
Brooks targeted middle-aged female prostitutes or homeless drug addicts as his victims. He committed his crimes around the city of Detroit, dumping their bodies in abandoned buildings and houses.

== Victims ==
Full list of Brooks' known victims

Number	Name	Sex	Age	Date of Murder	Notes
1	Sandra Davis	F	54	August 16, 2001	
2	Pamela Greer	F	33	January 22, 2002	
3	Marion Daniels	F	36	April 14, 2002	
4	Rhonda Myles	F	45	April 22, 2002	Bludgeoned to death with a brick
5	Thelma Johnson	F	30	November 5, 2002	
6	Melissa Toston	F	38	October 18, 2005	
7	Darylnn Washington	F	45	June 5, 2006	Brooks claimed the murder was a robbery gone wrong, not a sex attack

== Arrest, exposure and trial ==
On June 26, 2006, Brooks was arrested for sexually assaulting a woman. His DNA linked him to the 2002 slaying of Pamela Greer, and further investigations connected him to additional murders. In 2007, he was found guilty and was sentenced to two terms of life imprisonment. He is currently imprisoned at the Kinross Correctional Facility in Kincheloe, Michigan.

== See also ==
- List of homicides in Michigan
- List of serial killers in the United States
