= Gus Harrison Correctional Facility =

Prison in Adrian, Michigan, United States

Gus Harrison Correctional Facility (ARF)
- Interactive map of Gus Harrison Correctional Facility (ARF)
- Location: Adrian, Michigan; 41.88700°N 84.00672°W
- Status: Open
- Security class: Levels I, II, and IV
- Opened: 1991
- Managed by: Michigan Department of Corrections
- Warden: Paul Klee
- Website: Official website

Gus Harrison Correctional Facility (ARF) is a Michigan prison, in Adrian, for adult male prisoners.

== History ==
The prison was opened in 1991 and is named after the Michigan Department of Corrections's first director, Gus Harrison.

On August 9, 2009, Parr Highway Correctional Facility was consolidated into Gus Harrison Correctional Facility.

In early 2021, the facility was fined $6,300 over serious violations of Coronavirus regulations. At the time 187 employees had tested positive to the virus and one had died; in addition, 1465 prisoners tested positive and seven had died.

== Facility ==
The prison has six housing units used for Michigan Department of Corrections male prisoners 18 years of age and older.

=== Security ===
The facility is surrounded by double fences with razor-ribbon wire and two gun towers. Electronic detection systems and patrol vehicles are also utilized to maintain perimeter security.

== Services ==
The facility offers libraries, group counseling, substance-abuse treatment, and education programs. Onsite medical and dental care is supplemented by local hospitals and the Duane L. Waters Hospital in Jackson, Michigan.

== Notable inmates ==
- Chad Curtis, former major league baseball player convicted of sexual assault against three girl high school students.

== See also ==
- List of Michigan state prisons
