= Florence Crane Correctional Facility =

Prison in Coldwater, Michigan (1985–2011)

Florence Crane Correctional Facility (ACF)
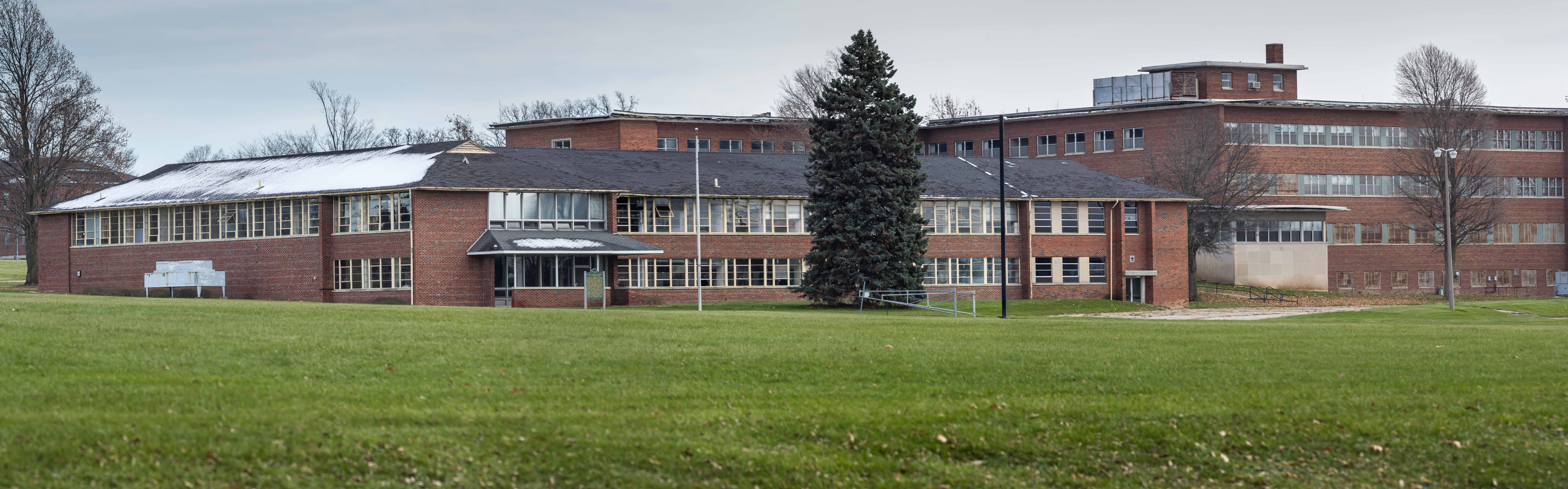
- Interactive map of Florence Crane Correctional Facility (ACF)
- Location: Coldwater, Michigan; 41.95825°N 84.99234°W
- Status: Closed
- Security class: Secure Level I
- Opened: April 1985
- Closed: June 1, 2011
- Managed by: Michigan Department of Corrections
- Website: Official website

Florence Crane Correctional Facility (ACF) was a Michigan prison, located in Coldwater, for adult male prisoners.

== History ==
The prison was opened in April 1985, after the facility was taken over from the Coldwater Regional Center for Developmental Disabilities and renovated. A new housing unit and food service building were opened in March 2000.

The prison was closed on June 1, 2011, and in 2019 several buildings were torn down.

== Facility ==
The prison had housing units used for Michigan Department of Corrections male prisoners 18 years of age and older. The facility also included a food service building. It was adjacent to the Lakeland Correctional Facility.

=== Security ===
The facility is surrounded by double fences with razor-ribbon wire. Electronic detection systems and patrol vehicles are also utilized to maintain perimeter security.

== Services ==
The facility offered education programs, a library, religious services, substance-abuse treatment, psychological services. Medical and dental care were provided by the Bureau of Health Care Services and supplemented by local hospitals.

Prisoners were also able to participate in vocational educational opportunities by working at the facility's food service, maintenance, and library operations.

== See also ==
- List of Michigan state prisons
