= List of killings by law enforcement officers in the United States, July 2010 =

This is a list of people reported killed by non-military law enforcement officers in the United States in July 2010, whether in the line of duty or not, and regardless of reason or method. The listing documents the occurrence of a death, making no implications regarding wrongdoing or justification on the part of the person killed or officer involved. Killings are arranged by date of the incident that caused death. Different death dates, if known, are noted in the description. The table below lists 35 people.

== July 2010 ==
Date	Name (Age) of Deceased	State (city)	Description
2010-07-31	Peter Russo (51)	Florida (Sebring)	
2010-07-28	Markiese Royalty (26)	Arizona (Phoenix)	Officers who were staging a sale of $250,000 worth of marijuana inside a home in Phoenix. A gunfight broke out during the staged sale, leaving one officer and two suspects dead.
2010-07-28	Roger Tatum (32)	Arizona (Phoenix)	Officers who were staging a sale of $250,000 worth of marijuana inside a home in Phoenix. A gunfight broke out during the staged sale, leaving one officer and two suspects dead.
2010-07-27	Angel Hernandez Farias (24)	California (Mendocino)	Authorities entered a marijuana garden on U.S. Forest Service land close to the Glenn County, California line in the Covelo, California, area. A Hispanic man in his 20s, Angel Hernandez Farias, and another suspect entered the garden about quarter to seven. According to law enforcement, Farias, age 24, pointed a gun at them. An unidentified officer fired back, wounding the suspect who attempted to run but was brought down by a K-9 unit. Farias died at the scene.
2010-07-23	Matthew Netter (23)	Washington (Silverdale)	Matthew James Netter was still buckled in the drivers seat when he was shot and killed by a Poulsbo, Washington, police officer during a July traffic stop. Media reports state Netter had jumped out of his car and pointed a weapon at Poulsbo officer Darrel Moore but eyewitness statements and dashcam video confirm Netter never left the vehicle - and Moore is heard on the audio repeatedly stating, "I thought I saw a gun." Three days later, when a search warrant was obtained, officials reported finding a Military/Police issued weapon that was in the trunk of Netters police impounded car. There are hundreds of crime scene photos and video - no weapon was recovered, documented or photographed immediately after the shooting. Netter, from Bremerton, Washington, was shot eight times at point blank range. The officer fired until Netter stopped moving, according to a report issued Friday by Kitsap County, Washington, Prosecuting Attorney Russell Hauge. Hauge found that Moore was "absolutely justified" in his use of force during the stop near Silverdale's Whaling Days festival July 23. The report relied on audio and video evidence from Moore's patrol car camera, along with the statement of a U.S. Navy officer who was a "ride along" observer who had also against protocol - exited Moore's vehicle during the traffic stop near the Whaling Days festival.
2010-07-22	Erik Demond Stokes (34)	Maryland (Baltimore)	Erik Stokes, 34, was under surveillance by authorities who were investigating a counterfeiting ring, said a police spokesman. When police attempted to arrest three suspects, two ran away and a third (Stokes) pulled a handgun and shot at detectives. Two detectives returned fire and killed Stokes.
2010-07-22	James Rivera (16)	California (Stockton)	Rivera had escaped from San Joaquin County Juvenile Hall, where he was being held pending felony charges. He was shot and killed following a short police pursuit involving a minivan and driver who matched descriptions given in an armed carjacking, said Stockton Police Department. Officers intentionally collided with the minivan to stop it. The driver, Rivera, lost control and crashed. When the minivan began moving backward toward officers, SPD said they feared for their lives and fired at the back window.
2010-07-21	Pedro Santa Cruz (40)	California (Los Angeles)	A patrol unit was called to investigate a prowler, according to LAPD. Officers saw a man a block away matching the description of the suspected prowler, police said. As they approached the person, later identified as Pedro Santa Cruz, he turned and began punching one of the officers, police said, and a physical altercation began. According to the LAPD, the officer's partner believed Santa Cruz was stabbing his colleague and so the partner fired his gun upon Santa Cruz. The officer involved in the fight sustained injuries to his head and hand.
2010-07-21	Naquan Johnson (21)	New Jersey (Gloucester Township)	Johnson was fleeing an apartment where he Tasered and sexually assaulted a woman and shot a man, authorities said. When officers tried to take him into custody, he a "made a threatening gesture" with a handgun, prompting officers to open fire, according to authorities.
2010-07-20	Jason Kemp (31)	Colorado (Grand Junction)	Officers forced entry into Kemp's home regarding a recent automobile accident and possible DUI. Kemp made a threatening move in the dark and was shot to death by an officer.
2010-07-19	Dennis Hamby (50)	Georgia (Douglasville)	Hamby was fatally shot in the parking lot of a Motel 6 in Douglasville, Georgia, by a Douglasville police officer on July 19, 2010. The deceased allegedly attempted to run over an officer after he was caught selling meth. The officer was pinned by the automobile and Hamby was shot in response to his action. Several uniformed and undercover officers were present and the incident was recorded by dashcam.
2010-07-18	Mark Walker (41)	Florida (Pace)	
2010-07-18	Rodney Eugene Harris (48)	Tennessee (Oak Ridge)	Oak Ridge, Tennessee, Police said Harris was advancing toward four officers, large knife in hand, and refusing repeated commands to drop the weapon. Harris had just stabbed a police dog and yanked an embedded Taser barb out of his body that had been fired by one officer in a bid to subdue him, Beams said.
2010-07-17	Tyron L. Stevenson (26)	Pennsylvania (Reading)	According to police: The department got a call of a gunpoint robbery involving two victims about 2:30 a.m. On arrival, a witness pointed out Stevenson as involved in the robbery. Officers tried to stop Stevenson, but he ran. Police chased him, and he got into a scuffle with an officer. During that scuffle, Stevenson fired a shot at the officer but missed, and the officer fired one shot at Stevenson, which killed him. Police said a pistol was recovered at the scene, and the weapon had a spent shell casing jammed inside.
2010-07-17	Fred Collins (48)	California (Oakland)	Oakland Police Department said they received 911 calls reporting a man who was believed to have been carrying weapons. Collins was encountered by two BART Police officers who attempted to subdue the man before he led them on a foot chase. Officers then attempted to Tase Collins twice while ordering him to drop two knives he was brandishing at the officers, police said. After the failed attempts at using the taser, authorities said Collins lunged at one of the officers while holding the knives in his hand. Police opened fire on the man and Collins died at the scene.
2010-07-16	Luciano Reyes (35)	California (Los Angeles)	LAPD officers from the Foothill Division responded to a domestic violence call about 12:40 a.m., said a spokeswoman for the Los Angeles Police Department. According to preliminary information provided by the coroner's office, Reyes allegedly confronted officers while pointing a gun at them, at which point he was shot.
2010-07-16	DeFarra Gaymon (48)	New Jersey (Newark)	Shot after reportedly lunging at police officer and threatening to kill him.
2010-07-15	Seth Privacky (30)	Michigan (Chippewa County)	The three inmates stole a tractor-trailer and crashed it through a fence at the Kinross Correctional Facility near Sault Ste. Marie, Michigan, on Thursday. Seth Privacky, 30, who had been serving a life sentence for killing five people near Muskegon in 1998, was shot dead by a corrections officer.
2010-07-14	Clifton Salter (60)	Florida (Belleview)	
2010-07-14	Rashaan Gilbert (33)	New Jersey (Newark)	Two Newark Police Department detectives identified as members of the city's gang investigations unit shot and killed Rashaan Gilbert, 33, of Newark, New Jersey, after he allegedly approached them on a South Ward street corner with a loaded weapon and refused to drop it.
2010-07-13	Lance G. Hummell (23)	New Mexico (Las Cruces)	Hummell drew a nearly 4-foot Katana as he exited the vehicle, raised the blade and walked toward the officers. ... Rivera and Camp drew their weapons and ordered Lance Hummell to stop. He did not, continuing to advance slowly toward the officers. ... Wormuth found the officers to be no further than 27 feet from Lance Hummell when Rivera shot and killed him.
2010-07-11	Jamarr Hassell (18)	Virginia (Norfolk)	Police spotted a vehicle driving erratically at 2:22 a.m. When they tried to pull the vehicle over, they say the driver fled on foot and was seen carrying a handgun. A press release states 'officers instructed the suspect to drop his gun. The suspect turned toward officers and began to raise his weapon when officers fired.' Family members say Hassell was running through a field when officers shot him in the back. Hassell's brother was asked whether Jamarr had a gun. 'Maybe he did, but that's not the point, 'he said.
2010-07-10	Javier Rueda (28)	California (Sun Valley)	Officers noticed a motorist, later identified as Rueda, who appeared to be driving under the influence, according to authorities. As police tried to pursue Rueda, he led them on a chase. He then stopped his car and exited with a handgun, police said. According to the news release, Rueda immediately began shooting at the officers who returned fire. Rueda was hit by several gunshots. He was taken to a hospital where he was pronounced dead.
2010-07-10	Erik B. Scott (38)	Nevada (Las Vegas)	U.S. Army Veteran and Concealed Carry Licensee killed by police after Costco employees called and reported a man with a gun.
2010-07-09	Traveon John Avila (15)	California (Bakersfield)	Police said Avila led the officers on a car chase after the officers tried to stop him for driving a stolen vehicle. The chase ended on a dead-end street where Avila attempted to back the car into the officers as they walked up to him. That's when they shot Avila multiple times, killing him.
2010-07-09	Marvin Booker (56)	Colorado (Denver)	Booker was being restrained using a chokehold, and even after handcuffed and from video taped recordings, appeared subdued, was tasered.
2010-07-08	William Hope, Jr. (25)	Illinois (Chicago)	Two plain-clothed officers wearing visible police identification approached William Hope as he sat in his car in the parking lot of a Popeyes Chicken and Biscuits. When the officers began to question the 25-year-old about burglaries and other criminal activities in the area, he became "erratic" and attempted to run over the officer, authorities said. As the officer attempted to reach in the vehicle and put the car in park, he became lodged in the window and Hope attempted to run him down, injuring the officer. The officer's partner opened fire four times, fatally shooting him. Police recovered a loaded 9mm pistol from the Hope's left pocket. In 2012 a federal jury found against the City of Chicago and officers Armando Ugarte and Michael St.Clair, awarding $4.6m to the Estate of William Hope, Jr.
2010-07-08	Joseph Baumgardner (24)	California (San Ramon)	Baumgardner ordered a 7-Eleven clerk to leave the store, said authorities, and the clerk went across the street to call police. The gunman spent the next hour drinking beer from the store's refrigerators. Officers contacted Baumgardner by phone and tried to coax him out of the building. Baumgardner demanded marijuana and refused to come out. Then, at 3:24 a.m., Baumgardner emerged from the 7-Eleven with a beer in one hand and the gun in the other. He then threw down his beer and pointed the weapon at the officers, who fired at him. "Officers had no other alternative," said authorities.
2010-07-08	James Popkowski (37)	Maine (Medway)	Shot after armed confrontation with police. Officers were responding to report of gunshots in woods near hospital.
2010-07-08	Jason Brown (26)	Florida (Arcadia)	
2010-07-07	Phyllis Owens (87)	Oregon (Boring)	Owens threatened her mobile home park manager with a semi-automatic handgun. She started yelling, 'What in hell are you doing, making all this racket at this time of night?'. Police were called to the scene and began negotiating with her. She agreed to put the gun down but when officers moved toward her she picked it up again. The officers tased her at this point. She was rushed to a hospital where died about an hour later.
2010-07-07	Mayceo Devangari (49)	Washington (Kent)	Shot after two-hour standoff by police responding to a domestic violence call. Police claim they believed Mr. Devangari was reaching into his pocket for a weapon, which they claim turned out to be a silver/chrome-colored crank flashlight. Devangari had made threats that he was armed and said that he wanted to die.
2010-07-07	Jeffrey Lee Clausen (33)	Minnesota (Cottage Grove)	Authorities say Clausen attempted to sell a rifle to an undercover officer and left in a car driven by his girlfriend. Police later stopped the car to arrest Clausen. Officers say Clausen got out of the car holding something that appeared to be a weapon. He was fatally shot by four members of the Washington County Special Response Team.
2010-07-05	DeCarlos Moore (36)	Florida (Miami)	The officers pulled Moore's car over and got out of their car. ... Brown-Williams testified that Moore got out of the car, walked toward the officers, then quickly returned to the Honda, reaching in through a window and turning toward Marin. Marin said he saw something that looked metallic in Moore's hand as he faced them ... he thought Moore was retrieving a weapon and fatally shot him in the head. Prosecutors said no weapon was found at the scene, but some aluminum foil containing crack cocaine was discovered nearby. The car actually was not stolen.
2010-07-01	Edward Swan Worthy (34)	Michigan (Southfield)	Worthy was the prime suspect in an armed robbery, and police had his apartment under surveillance. Authorities were alerted that the suspect had used a shotgun in the robbery. Worthy attempted to flee his apartment in his car but eventually spun out and crashed. As officers converged at the crash scene, Worthy fled on foot. At that time officers began firing at Worthy. The suspect was struck multiple times. It is not clear whether Worthy was armed at the time he tried to escape on foot.

== See also ==
- Death in custody § United States
- Henry A. Wallace Police Crime Public Database
- List of cases of police brutality
- List of countries with annual rates and counts for killings by law enforcement officers
- List of law enforcement officers killed in the line of duty in the United States
- List of law enforcement officers convicted for an on-duty killing in the United States
- List of police reforms related to the George Floyd protests
- List of unarmed African Americans killed by law enforcement officers in the United States
- Lists of killings by law enforcement officers
- Police brutality in the United States
- Police misconduct § United States
- Police riot § United States
- Police use of deadly force in the United States
