= Woodland Center Correctional Facility =

Former prison in Michigan, United States

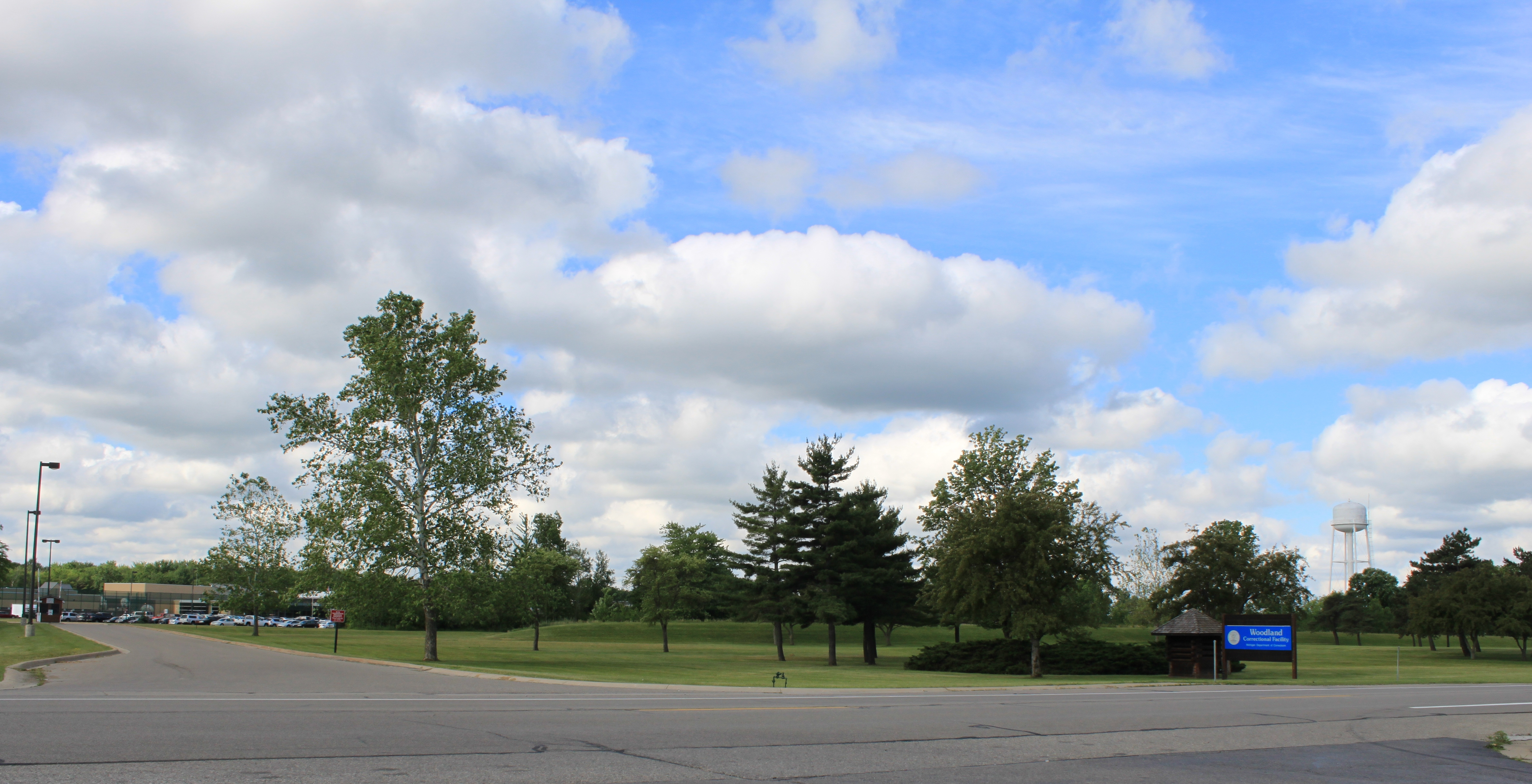
- Entrance to Woodland Center Correctional Facility
- Interactive map of Woodland Center Correctional Facility
- Location: Whitmore Lake, Michigan; 42.44231°N 83.76444°W
- Status: Open
- Security class: Level IV
- Opened: 2009
- Managed by: Michigan Department of Corrections
- Director: Warden Jodi DeAngelo
- Website: Official website

Woodland Center Correctional Facility (WCC) is a Michigan prison for male prisoners with serious mental illnesses who cannot function adequately in a general prison population.

== Facility/prison ==
The prison was opened in 2009 and has 10 housing pods, currently used for Michigan Department of Corrections male prisoners 18 years of age and older, except under certain circumstances when prisoners age 17 and below are admitted and housed separately. The facility is capable of providing on-site routine medical and dental care. Medical emergencies are treated by nearby hospitals. Food is prepared at a kitchen outside the secure perimeter and served at a designated area within the housing complex. The facility also provides religious programs, a general library, and a law library.

The facility perimeter is patrolled by vehicles with armed personnel and surrounded by a 14 feet (4.3 m) curved fence with anti-climb fabric and an electronic detection system.

== Services ==
The facility offers therapeutic programs, including evaluations and treatment services from the Corrections Mental Health Program (CMHP) which are classified into acute care, rehabilitation treatment, or crisis stabilization.

== See also ==
- List of Michigan state prisons
