= Kinross Correctional Facility =

Men's prison in Michigan, United States

Kinross Correctional Facility (KCF)
- Interactive map of Kinross Correctional Facility (KCF)
- Location: Kincheloe, Michigan; 46.249733°N 84.454626°W
- Status: Open
- Security class: Levels I and II
- Capacity: 1,280
- Opened: 1978
- Former name: Hiawatha Correctional Facility
- Managed by: Michigan Department of Corrections
- Warden: Jeffrey Howard
- Website: Official website

Kinross Correctional Facility (KCF) is a Michigan prison for men. It is located in the eastern Upper Peninsula of Michigan, in Chippewa County on the south side of Kincheloe, adjacent to Chippewa County International Airport. The original facility closed in October 2015, with most of the inmates relocating to the formerly closed Hiawatha Correctional Facility. Upon the move, the Kinross Correctional Facility name was transferred to the reopened complex.

== History ==
The original Kinross Correctional Facility closed in October 2015, with most of the inmates and the name moving to the formerly closed Hiawatha Correctional Facility.

=== Original facility ===
The original Kinross Correctional Facility was opened on January 16, 1978, on the barracks grounds of the former Kincheloe Air Force Base with an original capacity of 495 prisoners - which was increased to approximately 700 shortly after. At 113 acres (46 ha) it was the largest fenced area of any state prison in Michigan.

The original facility was closed in October 2015, having gained the ability to house almost 1,600 inmates. Approximately 1,280 inmates were relocated to the previously closed Hiawatha Correctional Facility and 300 transferred to the neighboring Chippewa Correctional Facility. The move was made when it was determined that it would be less costly to update the security at the Hiawatha facility than the original prison. The original facility was larger and held more inmates but had been converted from Air Force barracks in 1978, whereas Hiawatha was purposely built as a prison.

=== Hiawatha Correctional Facility ===
Hiawatha Correctional Facility (HTF) was built as a prison near the Kinross facility and opened in 1989.

The facility closed in August 2009.

It was reopened and renamed Kinross Correctional Facility when that facility closed in October 2015.

=== Escape attempts ===
Over the course of two years, four inmates dug a tunnel from their cell to the outside of the perimeter fence of the original facility. The plot was only discovered in March 2007, after the tunnel had been completed but the escape had to be delayed in order to find a getaway driver.

On July 15, 2010, Three inmates, all men convicted of mass murders, hijacked a supply truck at the prison and attempted to escape from the original facility by breaking it through a fence. The truck was unable to break through, getting stuck on the razor-wire. Seth Privacky, in prison for the murder of five members of his family, was shot and killed by guards as he attempted to flee the truck. The other two gave up when the truck became stuck.

== Facility ==
The current facility is composed of eight level II housing units, which can accommodate up to 1,280 prisoners. KCF also maintains a housing unit near the site of the former facility housing 320 level I prisoners. The 50 acre prison has ten buildings which includes an administration building, programs building, maintenance, food service and indoor activity areas.

=== Security ===
The facility is surrounded by two fences with razor-ribbon wire with electronic security devices. Armed staff are also utilized to maintain perimeter security.

== Services ==
The facility offers education programs, substance-abuse treatment, religious services, group psychotherapy, psychology, gardening, a music program, and handicraft activities. Onsite medical and dental care are supplemented by local community providers, the Brooks Medical Center at Marquette Branch Prison and the Duane L. Waters Hospital in Jackson, Michigan. There is vocational training available in auto repair, construction, custodial maintenance, business education technology, and horticulture. Prisoners in vocational training are also involved in constructing homes with Habitat for Humanity. The prison also has chapters of Vietnam Veterans of America and United States Junior Chamber.

== Notable inmates ==
Notable inmates at Kinross Correctional Facility have included:

- Gerald Atkins, serving a life sentence without parole for the Wixom Assembly Plant shooting in November 1996.
- Jack Kevorkian
- Joel Dufresne, a reverend with the Church of Creativity
- Seth Privacky
- Binary Star (hip hop group)

== See also ==
- List of Michigan state prisons
