= Chad Curtis =

American baseball player (born 1968)

- Outfielder
- Born: November 6, 1968 (age 57); Marion, Indiana, U.S.
- Batted: Right Threw: Right

MLB debut
- April 8, 1992, for the California Angels

Last MLB appearance
- September 30, 2001, for the Texas Rangers

MLB statistics
- Batting average: .264
- Home runs: 101
- Runs batted in: 461
- Stats at Baseball Reference

Teams
- California Angels (1992–1994); Detroit Tigers (1995–1996); Los Angeles Dodgers (1996); Cleveland Indians (1997); New York Yankees (1997–1999); Texas Rangers (2000–2001)

Career highlights and awards
- 2× World Series champion (1998, 1999)

Chad David Curtis (born November 6, 1968) is an American former professional baseball outfielder. Curtis played in Major League Baseball from 1992 to 2001 for the California Angels, Detroit Tigers, Los Angeles Dodgers, Cleveland Indians, New York Yankees, and Texas Rangers. He won World Series rings with the Yankees in 1998 and 1999. Curtis compiled a .264 career batting average and hit 101 home runs.

In 2013, Curtis was convicted of sexually assaulting three underaged female students while he was employed at Lakewood High School in Lake Odessa, Michigan. He served seven years in prison and was paroled in September 2020.

== Early life ==
Born in Marion, Indiana, Curtis was raised in Middleville, Michigan, and Benson, Arizona. He attended Benson High School, where he played baseball and varsity football, but was kicked off the basketball team for being "too fiery" and becoming involved in fights. He then attended Grand Canyon University, Cochise College, and Yavapai College, playing baseball at all three.

== Baseball career ==
=== California Angels (1992–1994) ===
Curtis was drafted in the 45th round of the 1989 Major League Baseball draft by the California Angels, the 1,155th player chosen.

Curtis made his major-league debut in 1992, playing in 139 games at all three outfield positions. He compiled a .259 average with 10 home runs and 46 runs batted in (RBIs), also stealing 43 bases, but was thrown out 18 times, second in the American League (AL). On June 26, 1992, Curtis had a five-RBI game against the Seattle Mariners.

In 1993, Curtis hit .285 with six home runs and 59 runs batted in, but led the league with 24 times caught stealing. He also led all AL outfielders in errors, with nine. In the strike-shortened 1994 season, Curtis played in 114 games, batting .256 while hitting 11 home runs with 50 runs batted in. During the season, Curtis had an argument with batting instructor Rod Carew, after which Carew said Curtis was selfish and "uncoachable". In the off season, Curtis had a shouting match with general manager Bill Bavasi about Curtis's contract.

On April 13, 1995, the 26-year-old Curtis was traded to the Detroit Tigers for 36-year-old utility player Tony Phillips.

=== Detroit Tigers (1995–1996) ===
During his first season as a Tiger, Curtis hit .268 with 21 homers and 67 runs batted in, while leading the AL with 670 plate appearances. In 1996, Curtis played in 104 games, hitting .263 with 10 home runs and 37 runs batted in. The Tigers, which had planned on releasing Curtis at the end of the season, traded him to the Los Angeles Dodgers on July 31, 1996, for relief pitchers John Cummings and Joey Eischen.

=== Los Angeles Dodgers (1996) ===
Curtis played in 43 games with the Dodgers, hitting just .212 with only 9 runs batted in. During the 1996 postseason, Curtis was 0-for-3 in his only game played. That season, his salary was $2 million. On October 15, 1996, he became a free agent.

=== Cleveland Indians (1997) ===
Curtis signed with the Indians on December 18, 1996. In 1997, Curtis played in only 22 games for the Indians, hitting .207 (6-for-29) with three home runs and five runs batted in.

In May 1997, after Curtis objected to lyrics of a rap song teammate Kevin Mitchell allegedly was playing in the clubhouse, Curtis shut off the clubhouse stereo and exchanged punches with Mitchell, who threw him over a ping-pong table. Curtis sustained a bruised right thumb in the fight, and was placed on the 15-day disabled list.

On June 9, 1997, the Indians traded Curtis to the Yankees for pitcher David Weathers.

=== New York Yankees (1997–1999) ===
Curtis was a member of the Yankees' World Series-winning teams in 1998 and 1999.

In 1997 with the Yankees, Curtis hit .291 with 12 home runs and 50 runs batted in. In the postseason, he went 1-for-6 with three walks and a strikeout. In 1998, Curtis hit .243 with 10 home runs and 56 RBIs during the Yankees' 114-win regular season. In the 1998 American League Division Series, Curtis was 2-for-3 with a run scored and a stolen base. In the 1998 AL Championship Series, he was 0-for-4 with a walk and a strikeout. He did not play in the 1998 World Series.

In 1999, Curtis played in just 99 games, hitting .262 with five home runs and 24 RBIs. In the 1999 American League Division Series, Curtis played in all three games and scored one run despite not recording any hits. In the 1999 American League Championship Series, he scored a run and stole a base, again without recording a hit.

Curtis played all four games of the 1999 World Series in left field. He is best known for hitting a walk-off home run in game 3 of the series against the Atlanta Braves; it was his second home run of the game. When immediately following the home run, NBC sportscaster Jim Gray sought to conduct an on-field interview with Curtis, he refused to talk with Gray. He indicated that this was in response to Gray's earlier, pointed interview on gambling with Pete Rose, a former baseball player who had been banned from involvement with MLB because of his gambling history. Curtis told Gray: "I can't do it. As a team, we kind of decided, because of what happened with Pete, we're not going to talk out here on the field." Then-Yankees manager Joe Torre later said no such unified effort was made to snub Gray from either Yankees players or front office staff, and that Curtis had acted alone.

During Curtis's playing time in New York, he was known "more for his aggressive proselytizing and capacity for moral reprobation than anything he did on the field." He publicly scolded his teammate Derek Jeter, in front of teammates and reporters both near the dugout and at Jeter's locker in the clubhouse, for fraternizing with then-Seattle Mariners shortstop Alex Rodriguez during an on-field fracas between the two teams, telling Jeter he did not know how to play the game. He also persistently solicited Jeter to attend chapel, after Jeter had already declined. Curtis said: "If I have something that I believe is the truth and it's necessary for other people to come to some type of a recognition or grip of that truth, then I want to share it."

On December 13, 1999, the Yankees traded Curtis to the Texas Rangers for pitchers Brandon Knight and Sam Marsonek. A Yankee official said: "Chad just couldn't stay around any longer because that act gets tired. Once he became comfortable here, he became a preacher, and it ran its course."

=== Texas Rangers (2000–2001) ===
During the 2000 season, Curtis became the first right-handed batter to hit a home run into the upper deck in right field at Rangers Ballpark in Arlington. Curtis played in 108 games that year, hitting .272 with eight home runs and 48 RBIs. He was second in the AL among left fielders in errors, with five. That season, his salary was $2 million.

In April 2000, Curtis had a heated confrontation in the clubhouse weight room with teammate Royce Clayton that nearly came to blows. Curtis insisted on turning off rap music that Clayton was playing because Curtis objected to the lyrics. Curtis also turned off a television show in the clubhouse that he disapproved of his teammates watching. During that season, he also told outfielder Gabe Kapler, his Jewish teammate, that Kapler was going to hell if he did not believe that Jesus Christ was his Lord and Savior.

In 2001, he hit .252 with three home runs and 10 RBIs in just 38 games. That season, he earned $1.9 million. On November 5, 2001, Curtis was granted free agency. He retired from professional baseball after the 2001 season. As a major leaguer, Curtis batted .264 with 101 home runs.

== Career after baseball ==
After retiring from MLB, Curtis earned a teaching certificate at the evangelical Cornerstone University in Grand Rapids, Michigan. Curtis then worked for two years as a physical education teacher and coach at Caledonia High School, outside of Grand Rapids.

Starting in the fall of 2006, Curtis was employed as the athletic director and weight-training instructor at NorthPointe Christian High School, a fundamentalist Baptist school in Grand Rapids. He helped construct a weight room at the school. He was fired without public explanation in the late fall of 2009.

During the 2010–11 school year, Curtis began substitute teaching and volunteering in the Lakewood Public Schools (Lake Odessa, Michigan) weight room. Along with coaching youth baseball, in 2011, Curtis coached the Lakewood Public Schools equestrian team, which included two of his daughters. The team won state Division D championship honors that same year. Curtis also worked as a substitute teacher, high-school weight-training coach, and head coach of the high-school varsity football team.

== Personal life ==
Curtis married his college sweetheart, the former Candace Reynolds, in 1990. The since-divorced couple has six children.

Curtis portrays himself as a "Bible-believing Christian". In a 2014 interview, he claimed that he never drank alcohol, never swore, and never committed adultery. As an MLB player, he chastised teammates for missing chapel, listening to explicit rap, and watching The Jerry Springer Show on television.

== Criminal convictions ==
In May 2012, after several female students accused him of "inappropriate touching", Curtis resigned from his positions at Lakewood Public Schools. In June 2012, Curtis was ordered to stand trial for five counts of criminal sexual conduct ranging from misdemeanors to felonies carrying a potential 15-year sentence. In August 2012, Curtis was charged with an additional, sixth count of criminal sexual conduct.

Curtis's criminal trial began on August 12, 2013, during which three of his victims and two others—all underaged girls—testified. According to testimony, Curtis offered massages to some of the female athletes at the school, but not to any of the boys. Curtis was accused of molesting two 15-year-old girls in 2012 when he was a volunteer weight-room strength trainer at Lakewood High School in Lake Odessa, Michigan, and of sexually assaulting a 16-year-old girl in 2011. (Curtis told his 2011 victim that his conduct toward her was the "most unfaithful" he had ever been to his wife.) He gave the massages first in the school's weight room, then in a room next to the weight room, and ultimately in a windowless trainer's room.

On August 16, Curtis was found guilty on all six counts, including third-degree criminal sexual conduct (a crime that involves sexual penetration). In an hour-long address to the court, Curtis accused all his victims of lying; he claimed that they made unwelcome sexual advances to him. The Barry County, Michigan, Prosecutor Julie Nakfoor Pratt later stated that Curtis' sentencing statement "was the most selfish, self-serving, victim-blaming statement I've heard in my career as a prosecutor. ... It speaks volumes about his character, or lack thereof".

On October 3, 2013, Curtis was sentenced by Barry County Circuit Court Judge Amy McDowell to 7 to 15 years in prison. In February 2015, Curtis's criminal convictions were upheld by the Michigan state appeals court in a 3–0 decision. After pursuing an attempt in March 2016 for resentencing, Curtis later withdrew the request when the presiding judge signaled that Curtis faced the possibility of a longer term of incarceration.

After Curtis's conviction, his former teammate Gabe Kapler wrote:

I'm floored that I misjudged the character of a man so horribly. Perhaps I was blinded with the mantle of righteous moral authority he always tried to wear and never looked deeper. ... Chad Curtis wasn't the first major leaguer to commit a heinous crime. I'm confident in my assessment, however, that he'll represent the last time that I allow the veil of religion and perceived moral high ground to impede my better judgment of another human being's fiber.

Curtis was incarcerated at the Gus Harrison Correctional Facility in Adrian, Michigan. He was paroled on September 22, 2020, and placed on supervision for the next two years.

== Civil cases ==
In a 2014 federal civil lawsuit filed against Curtis by his three victims in the criminal sexual conduct case and by a fourth Lakewood High School student accuser with similar claims, Curtis was found liable for battery against all four girls. A former Lakewood Public Schools board member who had started a group ministry with Curtis, Brian Potter, revealed for the first time in a 2015 deposition that Curtis had admitted to him in May 2012 that Curtis kissed one of the victims and had been "inappropriate". Potter had not reported the conversation to authorities.

In June 2017, Curtis' victims settled a civil lawsuit against Lakewood Public Schools for $575,000.

In September 2017, Curtis entered into a settlement with three of his four victims. The fourth victim took Curtis to trial; in October 2017, she was awarded a $1.8 million judgment against Curtis.

In May 2018, a federal lawsuit was filed by one of Curtis' victims, claiming that Curtis transferred nearly all his money and assets to his ex-wife, Candace Curtis, in an effort to avoid court-ordered payouts to his victims. Citing recorded telephone conversations between Chad and Candace Curtis, plaintiff's attorney Monica Beck said, "They [Curtis and his ex-wife] transferred lots of money, vehicles, houses, and disposed and liquidated a lot of their assets, which they then tried to hide from the state of Michigan and then tried to hide from our client." Beck also cited a statement by Candace Curtis during one of those telephone conversations: "I'm trying to keep things out of (victim's) hands." In January 2019, Candace Curtis lost a bankruptcy petition, with the judge writing that "[Candace Curtis] is simply attempting to forestall, if not escape, the post-judgment collection proceedings in District Court," and "[Candace Curtis'] testimony [ ] is indicative of [her] lack of good faith."
