= Camp Cusino =

Camp Cusino Correctional Facility
- Location: Shingleton, Michigan
- Status: CLOSED
- Security class: Minimum (Level 1)
- Capacity: 320
- Opened: 1951
- Closed: July 26, 2009
- Managed by: Michigan Department of Corrections, Alger Maximum Correctional Facility
- Director: Patricia L. Caruso

Camp Cusino was created in 1951. It is located one mile west of Shingleton, Michigan. The camp was officially called the Cusino Corrections Prison Work Camp and was part of the Corrections Conservation Prison Camp Program in the State of Michigan. The name Cusino was taken from a Civilian Conservation Corps (CCC) camp that was located four miles east of Melstrand, Michigan. In 1951, some of the CCC buildings were moved to Shingleton for the prison camp. The inmates were trustee status and many worked for the neighboring Cusino Wildlife Research Station. Other inmates were transported daily to do timber stand improvement and maintain area state parks. In 1968 the camp held 93 prisoners with nine staff. In 1979 the old wooden barracks were replaced with modern block buildings. In 1996 the prison camp population was 350. The security level of the prisoners was increased and the camp proper was fenced in with cyclone/razor wire fencing.

In 1997 the prison camp was placed under the jurisdiction of the Alger Maximum Correctional Facility located in Wetmore, Michigan. The Corrections Conservation Prison Camp Program, which had its headquarters in Grass Lake, Michigan, was officially disbanded.

Camp Cusino was closed on July 26, 2009.

== See also ==
- List of Michigan state prisons
