= Special Alternative Incarceration Facility =

Prison in Chelsea, Michigan

Special Alternative Incarceration Facility (SAI)
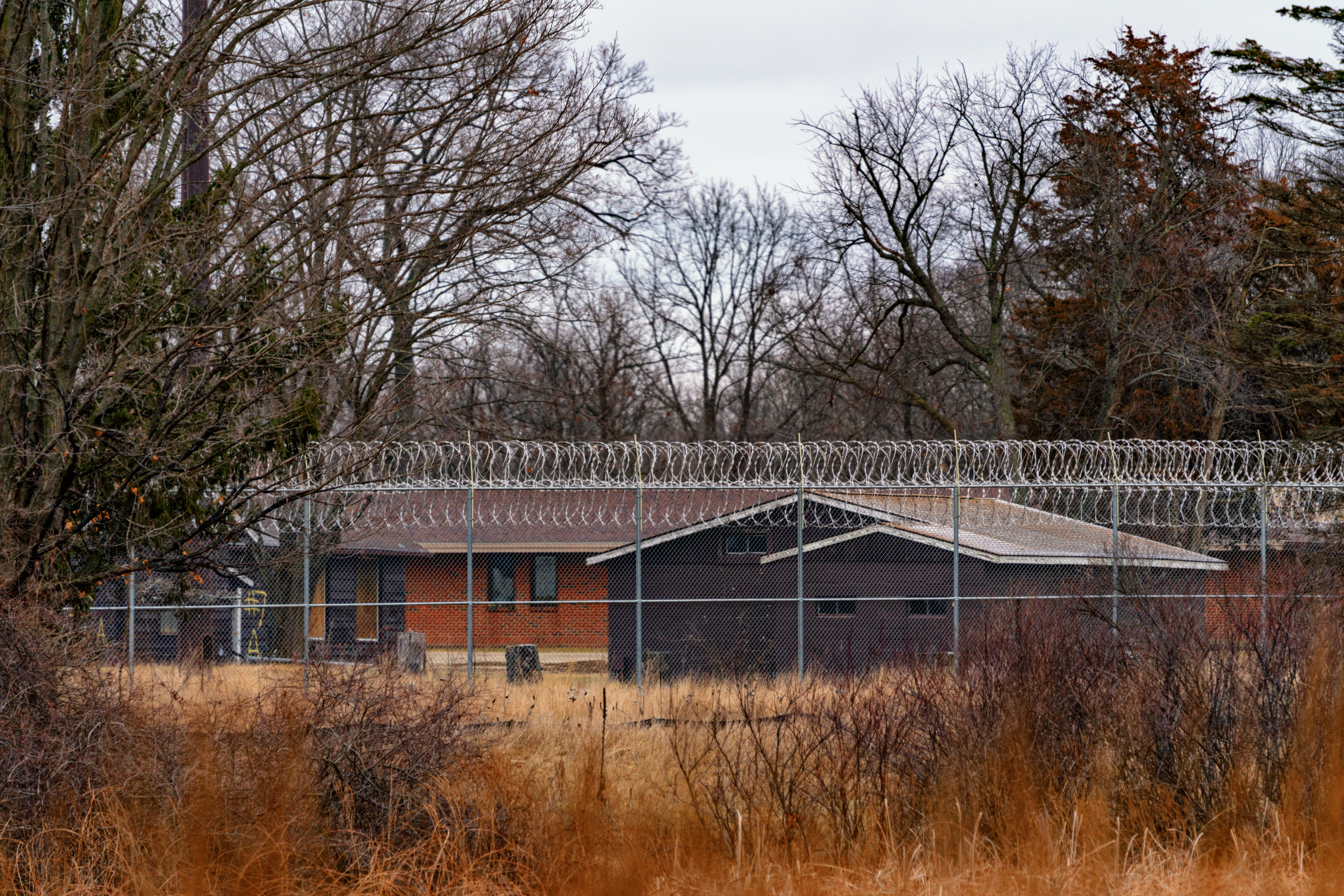
- Interactive map of Special Alternative Incarceration Facility (SAI)
- Location: Chelsea, Michigan; 42.3486°N 84.0761°W
- Status: Closed
- Security class: Special Alternative Incarceration
- Opened: 1988
- Closed: 2020
- Managed by: Michigan Department of Corrections, Cooper Street Correctional Facility
- Director: Warden Joe Barrett

Special Alternative Incarceration Facility (SAI) was an alternative prison in Chelsea, Michigan. It was formerly a minimum security boot camp (correctional) known as Camp Cassidy Lake for male and female probationers. The facility was a part of the Michigan Department of Corrections.

After May 1, 2009, SAI was no longer referred to as a "boot camp (correctional)". It was a full service Michigan Prisoner ReEntry Initiative (MPRI) In-Reach Correctional Facility.

== History ==
Under the administrative control of the Cooper Street Correctional Facility, the Special Alternative Incarceration program (SAI) began in 1988 as an alternative to prison for male probationers convicted of certain crimes and selected by courts. In 1992 the program was expanded to include both male and female prisoners and probationers. State law precludes participation if convicted of a number of primarily assaultive crimes.

In January 2014, a Special Alternative Incarceration program was started at the Huron Valley Women's Facility where all female offenders are now housed.

== Program ==
Phase I of the program involved a highly disciplined regimen of 90 days, consisting of military-style exercise, meaningful work assignments and other programming, including secondary education and substance-abuse treatment. Phase II involved intensive supervision in the community, usually in a residential "halfway house" setting. Phase III of the program involved supervision of offenders similar to the way in which probationers were supervised. Phase I and III were mandatory, and Phase II was determined by assessing a particular offender's need for residential placement. The goal of the program was to keep selected lower-risk probationers from going to prison and to take qualified prisoners out of the traditional prison setting and place them into a more cost-effective management setting. The program proved to be cost-effective and successful in keeping graduates out of prison.

The military discipline portion of the program was designed to break down street-wise attitudes so staff could teach positive values and attitudes. Offenders took classes in job-seeking skills, substance-abuse awareness and anger management. They were also enrolled in General Educational Development preparation and Adult Basic Education. They performed a variety of tasks, including conservation work, recycling, parks maintenance and snow removal near senior housing.

The SAI program included an intensive post-release program and possibly included Phase II, which was placement for up to 120 days in a residential setting or on electronic monitoring. For prisoners, Phase III included a parole for 18 months or for the balance of the minimum sentence, whichever was longer. The first four months of parole were under intensive supervision, which could include daily supervision, including nights and weekends, if needed.

While in post release, offenders were expected to work or go to school at least 30 hours per week. They were required to submit to a drug test when requested and participate in any counseling, treatment programming or training, as directed by the agent.

== Staffing ==
Because of the rigorous nature of the SAI program and the extent to which the success of the program was dependent upon the performance of staff, it was imperative that staff, particularly custody staff, be carefully selected and appropriately trained and that their performance be carefully evaluated. To achieve these objectives, the SAI program developed entry-level physical conditioning standards for new corrections officers and obtained the approval of the Michigan Corrections Officers Training Council (MCOTC) to implement them. All uniformed custody staff had to complete a three-week SAI drill instructor training program. Instructional materials used in this training were published in instructional manuals in pocketbook format to facilitate staff reference. The performance evaluation process for SAI staff was also formalized, with each staff member receiving a written performance review.

== Current status ==
This facility closed on March 7 2020, and was consolidated with the Cooper Street Correctional Facility. Demolition of the property began in January 2023.

== See also ==
- List of Michigan state prisons
