= State Public School at Coldwater =

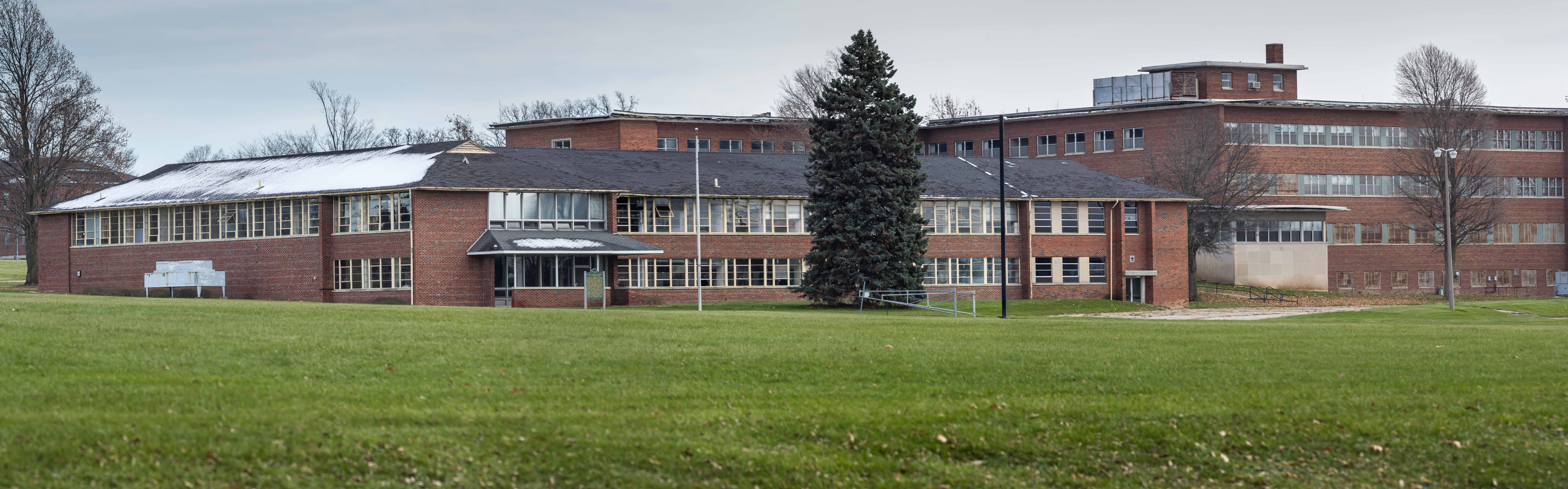
- Interactive map of the State Public School at Coldwater area

General information
- Location: 520 Marshall Rd., Coldwater, Michigan
- Coordinates: 41.961070°N 84.998602°W
- Completed: 1874

Michigan State Historic Site
- Designated: May 13, 1981

Michigan's State Public School at Coldwater was an model institution at Coldwater, Michigan. It was established by the state legislature in 1871, but was not formally opened until 1874. This institution paralleled a trend of state governments founding nonsectarian schools to provide for the education and support of dependent and ill-treated children from poorhouses. The goal of the institution was to accept, care for, educate, and place children aged four to sixteen who either came from county poorhouses, were abandoned, are orphans, or are those whose parents were convicted of crime in order to help them become independent. The board of control, however, had the discretionary power vested in it of admitting children under two where circumstances warranted such an exception. At least ten states later adopted Michigan's state "school" system to care for public wards, including Colorado, Kansas, Minnesota, Montana, Nebraska, Nevada, Rhode Island, Texas, and Wisconsin.

In 1902 there were 155 inmates in the school. The school was located on a farm of 160 acres, covered partly by orchards, ornamental trees, and gardens. The buildings consisted of an administration building, schoolhouse proper, and nine cottages among which the inmates are distributed. Under the superintendence of matrons who were specially qualified for that work, this system of cottages attempted to foster a love for home life. Michigan was the first in establishing this type of school. Similar institutions were later established in Iowa, Minnesota, Kansas, Montana, Colorado, Wisconsin, Texas, Nebraska, Alabama, Rhode Island, and Nevada.

In 1935, State Public School was renamed to Michigan Children's Village and began restricting admission to children with mild mental impairments.

The buildings and grounds became part of the Florence Crane Correctional Facility in 1985. The facilities closed in 2011, and in 2019 several buildings were torn down.
