= Standish Maximum Correctional Facility =

Closed Michigan Department of Corrections maximum security prison in Standish, MI

Coordinates: 43.97963°N 83.994722°W

- Interactive map of Standish Maximum Correctional Facility
- Location: Standish, Michigan
- Status: Closed
- Security class: Maximum Security (Level V)
- Capacity: 604
- Opened: April, 1990
- Closed: October 31, 2009
- Managed by: Michigan Department of Corrections
- Director: Patricia L. Caruso

Standish Maximum Correctional Facility (SMF) was a Michigan Department of Corrections maximum security prison in Standish, Michigan. The men's facility was on the south side of M-61. It was once considered as a potential site for housing detainees to be relocated from the prison in Guantánamo Bay, Cuba. The facility was in operation for over 19 years. As of August 2025, the facility remains unused but the facility still stands.

== History ==
The prison opened in April, 1990. Although scheduled to close on October 1, 2009, interest in the prison was shortly raised by the prospects of it housing relocated Guantanamo Bay prisoners in the continental United States. It consisted of five 88-bed housing units and one 164-bed unit.

In August 2009 it was announced that the Standish facility and the U.S. Disciplinary Barracks at Fort Leavenworth, Kansas were being considered as the sites for the relocation of foreign detainees from the Guantanamo Bay detention camp, which was under consideration for closure. Michigan public officials, including both of its senators (Carl Levin and Debbie Stabenow) and governor, Jennifer Granholm, objected at the time. However, opinions were mixed in Standish, where the unemployment rate was at 17%, with politicians welcoming the move, but some residents protested at the decision.

In September 2009 the Obama administration stated that Standish would no longer be a candidate for possible US sites to replace Guantanamo.

On October 31, 2009, Standish Maximum Correctional Facility closed as a result of Michigan budget cuts.

In May, 2015, the independent feature film, Heartlock, filmed at Standish Maximum Correctional Facility.

== Highways ==
- M-61
- I-75

== See also ==
- List of Michigan state prisons
