= Ojibway Correctional Facility =

Prison in Michigan, United States

Coordinates: 46°18′20″N 89°42′24″W

- Interactive map of Ojibway Correctional Facility
- Location: N 5705 Ojibway Road Marenisco Township, Michigan
- Status: closed
- Security class: minimum
- Capacity: 1180
- Opened: 1971
- Closed: 2018
- Managed by: Michigan Department of Corrections

The Ojibway Correctional Facility was a state prison for men located in Marenisco Township, Gogebic County, Michigan, owned and operated by the Michigan Department of Corrections.

The facility was first opened in 1971 as Camp Ojibway, and converted to an enclosed prison in 2000. It had a working capacity of 1,180 prisoners held at a minimum security level. It was closed on 1 December 2018 after the Michigan prison population declined from 51,500 in 2007 to 39,000 in 2018.

In August 2025 state representatives Gregory Markkanen and Joseph Fox offered house resolution 151 encouraging the federal government to purchase the facility for an Immigration and Customs Enforcement (ICE) detention and deportation center. An alternate proposal by Katie LaCross envisioned converting the location to a state-of-the-art psychiatric hospital. At a Marinescco Township board meeting in February 2026, 25 people spoke out against the ICE detention center, with many supporting the idea of a hospital.
