= Saint Louis Downtown Historic District =

Historic district in Michigan, United States

- U.S. National Register of Historic Places
- U.S. Historic district
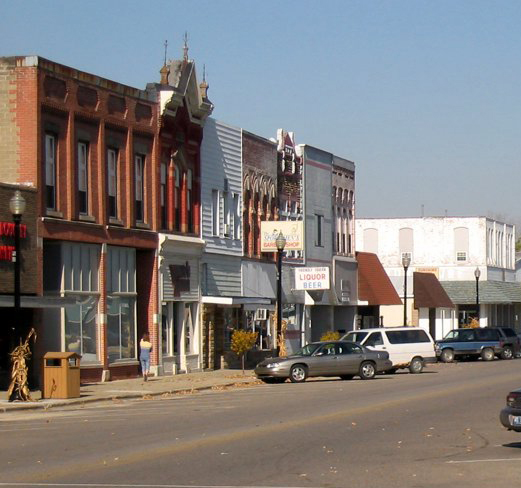
- North Mill Street, looking north

- Location within Michigan Location within the United States
- Interactive map
- Location: N. Mill St., W. Saginaw & W. Center Aves., Saint Louis, Michigan
- Coordinates: 43°24′35″N 84°36′32″W
- Built by: Ronald A. Gillis, Charles Axtell, Chauncey Waterbury
- Architect: Ronald A. Gillis, Karl Frederick Krauss. Jr.,
- Architectural style: Late Victorian
- NRHP reference No.: 14000976
- Added to NRHP: December 3, 2014

The Saint Louis Downtown Historic District is a commercial historic district located on North Mill Street, West Saginaw Avenue, and West Center Avenue in Saint Louis, Michigan It was listed on the National Register of Historic Places in 2014. The district is surrounded by residential neighborhoods, and is still the commercial center of Saint Louis.

== History ==
Saint Louis was founded in 1853. Lumbering was the first industry in the area, and the town grew quickly, with 140 residents by 1865 and 477 in 1868. In 1869, a nearby mineral springs was tapped, which quickly became a popular tourist destination. The first substantial building in the downtown area was constructed that year, and in 1870 there was a building boom in anticipation of tourists visiting the springs. The Saginaw Valley & St. Louis Railroad was constructed to the village in 1871, and Saint Louis grew in population and size in the 1870s and 1880s, mainly due to the steady stream of visitor to the mineral baths. In 1881, a new ordinance required all new building construction downtown to be of brick. In 1891, the village was incorporated as a city, and by 1900 it had nearly 2,000 residents.

After the turn of the century, more businesses and industry moved into the city, complementing the tourism business and the surrounding agriculture. In the 1950s and 1960s many of the downtown business buildings were modernized. Some of the buildings were demolished, or succumbed to fire, in the 1960s and 1970s.

== Description ==
The Saint Louis Downtown Historic District includes 36 buildings in the city's central business district, 27 of which contribute to the historic nature of the district. The buildings were constructed from the 1870s to the 1990s, with most of them dating to the late nineteenth and early twentieth centuries. Most buildings are two-story brick commercial structures, interspersed with one-and three-story buildings, and are situated close together with shared walls. They range in style from Victorian to International style.

The most significant buildings in the district include the 1881 Harrington House/Commercial State Bank Block (the only three-story building in the district), the 1908 Colonial Theater Block, and the 1881 Holcomb Opera House Building.
