= Nancy Seaman =

American murderer (born 1952)

- Born: Nancy Ann D'Onofrio; May 13, 1952 (age 74); Lincoln Park, Michigan, U.S.
- Spouse: Robert Seaman (m. 1973; died 2004)
- Children: 2
- Status: Serving life at Women's Huron Valley Correctional Facility
- Conviction: First degree murder

Nancy Ann Seaman (née D'Onofrio; born May 13, 1952) is an American woman and former teacher at Longacre Elementary School in Farmington Hills, Michigan, who was convicted of first-degree murder in 2005 for killing her husband with a hatchet. Jurors rejected her argument that she killed her husband in self-defense and decided that the murder was premeditated. She is currently serving her life sentence at the Women's Huron Valley Correctional Facility.

== Early life and marriage ==
Nancy Ann D'Onofrio was born on May 13, 1952, in Lincoln Park, Michigan, to Lenore and Eugene D'Onofrio. She was the valedictorian of her high school class. She met her husband Bob Seaman in 1972 and they married a year later. Bob worked at Ford Motor Company while Nancy stayed home. In 1979, Nancy and Bob had their first son Jeff, followed by son Greg in 1981. In 1995, she began working as an elementary schoolteacher.

== Marital abuse ==
Shortly into the couple's marriage, Nancy cites her first incident of spousal abuse, where her drunken husband attempted to push her out of a moving car. She later claimed that other incidents of physical abuse occurred in her marriage sporadically, but intensified after her husband lost his job at Borg Warner Automotive. She stated that "Bob would shove. That's what he liked to do, shove and push against walls. Most of my bruisings were either that he would grab me by an article of clothing or an arm. He would squeeze my arm and push me against the wall. Sometimes I'd get knocked down." Nancy's younger son Greg stated that he saw his father both physically and mentally abuse his mother; however, her older son Jeff denies that any abuse ever occurred.

== Murder and investigation ==
By 2004, Nancy and Bob Seaman were planning to divorce. They were living on different floors of their home. In February, Nancy was planning to move out of the couple's home and into a condo, which she told her husband was for their younger son, Greg. Nancy claimed that on Monday morning May 10, 2004, after Bob had been away for the weekend, an argument ensued over her moving out. She claimed that her husband was holding a kitchen knife, became enraged and chased her into their garage. According to physical evidence, Nancy grabbed a hatchet in the garage and struck her husband with it at least 20 times. Following the murder, Nancy went into school that day after she failed to find a substitute teacher.

Nancy Seaman was arrested by police on the Wednesday following the murder. A relative of Bob's informed police that Bob was missing and when police went to question Nancy, they found Bob's body wrapped in a tarp with duct tape in the back of her Ford Explorer. Police also found the knife that was used to stab Bob to death inside the tarp. Despite Nancy's claims of self-defense, police had a different version of events. Instead of Bob attacking Nancy, police alleged it was the other way around, claiming that Nancy ambushed her husband in their kitchen with the hatchet, then dragged his body into the garage where she stabbed him with a knife and beat him with a sledgehammer. The police had evidence to support their claims. Just a day before the killing, video surveillance captured Nancy purchasing the hatchet at the Home Depot, which she said was used to cut down a stump in their front yard. The following day, Nancy returned to Home Depot, where she purchased duct tape, the tarp, bleach, and other cleaning products. A third trip to Home Depot revealed that Nancy shoplifted a hatchet, and then attempted to return it with the receipt she received after purchasing the first hatchet. On the Friday following the murder, Nancy was formally charged with first-degree murder; she pleaded not guilty to the charge.

== Trial and conviction ==
Six months after the murder, on November 29, 2004, Nancy Seaman's murder trial began. She had spent the last six months in the Oakland County Jail. While Nancy claimed that she had killed her husband in self-defense, prosecutor Lisa Ortleib-Gorcyca alleged that Nancy killed her husband out of rage, stating how Nancy was angry that although she planned to leave her husband, Bob was about to leave her first. Ortleib-Gorcyca also stated how Nancy believed that her husband was having an affair with another woman, although this wasn't the case. She alleged that after a marital fight, Nancy went straight to Home Depot where she purchased the hatchet she would use to kill her husband.

Despite the prosecutor's statements, Nancy persisted in her arguments of self-defense. She testified in her own defense on December 7, 2004, saying that she and Bob got into "the grand finale of all fights" on May 10 because she planned to leave. Nancy went on to describe the violent struggle that ended in Bob's death. In the end however, Nancy was convicted of first-degree, premeditated murder, which in Michigan carries an automatic life sentence. Following this conviction, trial judge John McDonald reduced this conviction to second-degree murder, citing a lack of evidence to support a first-degree murder conviction. This decision was later overturned by the Michigan Court of Appeals back to first degree murder. She is serving her sentence in Women's Huron Valley Correctional Facility.

== Appeals ==
After Nancy Seaman's appeals in state court were exhausted, she petitioned for a new trial in federal court. On November 4, 2010, her conviction was overturned by United States federal judge Bernard A. Friedman on the basis that her defense attorneys were not fully able to develop their theory of battered woman syndrome. A new trial was ordered, until January 19, 2011, when another federal judge ordered a stay of proceedings in her appeal. However, on November 25, 2012, it was announced that a three-judge panel for the Sixth Circuit of the United States Court of Appeals denied Nancy's motion for a new trial, citing that: "Battered spouse syndrome (Battered person syndrome) is not itself a defense under Michigan law."

== See also ==
- List of homicides in Michigan
