= Marquette Branch Prison =

Prison and historic place in Michigan, United States

- State House of Correction and Branch Prison
- U.S. National Register of Historic Places
- Michigan State Historic Site
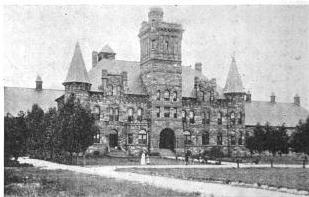
- Prison, c. 1911

- Location within Michigan
- Interactive map
- Location: 1960 US 41 South; Marquette, Michigan
- Coordinates: 46°30′44″N 87°22′57″W
- Built: 1889
- Built by: Wahlman & Grip
- Architect: William Scott & Co.
- Architectural style: Richardsonian Romanesque
- NRHP reference No.: 77000720
- Added to NRHP: November 23, 1977

The Marquette Branch Prison (MBP) is located in Marquette, Michigan on the south shore of Lake Superior. The prison, which opened in 1889, is a facility of the Michigan Department of Corrections that holds about 1,100 inmates in maximum and minimum-security housing. The inmate population consists of adult males, aged eighteen and older. The prison was listed on the National Register of Historic Places as State House of Correction and Branch Prison on November 23, 1977.

MBP was listed on the National Register of Historic Places in order to maintain its original buildings. MBP has become one of the state's most outstanding tourist attractions because of the beautiful flower gardens and other landscaping around the prison grounds. MBP was a prison full of attempted escapes, bloodshed, and reconstruction during the 19th century.

The first outdoor game to feature an official NHL team was held on February 2, 1954. The Detroit Red Wings played an exhibition game on an outdoor ice surface, in 21 °F (−6 °C) degree weather, against inmates at Marquette Branch Prison. After the first period the Red Wings led in the game 18–0; the rest of the game the score was not kept.

== Origin ==
During the late 19th century the population in the Upper Peninsula quickly grew as did the number of criminal convictions. Lower Michigan prisons (Ionia and Jackson) were becoming overpopulated and the cost of moving prisoners from the Upper Peninsula to the Lower Peninsula prisons was becoming expensive. Talk of building a prison in the Upper Peninsula began. The Business Men's Association of Marquette, Michigan argued that Marquette provided a "centrally located community with excellent transportation and water facilities as well as the natural resources required to build the prison."

The Michigan legislature appropriated $150,000 to fund the proposed prison. The prison board of commissioners approved the site for the Marquette Branch Prison. A total of ten companies submitted bids for the prison. The lowest bid ($135,817.00) belonged to Wahlman and Grip of Ishpeming and they were given the contract. The first buildings included an administration building, east and west cell block wings connected by a rotunda, a dining hall, a hospital, and a power house. Construction began with the rotunda and west wing in July 1886 and all buildings were completed by June 22, 1889.

== Historic Buildings ==
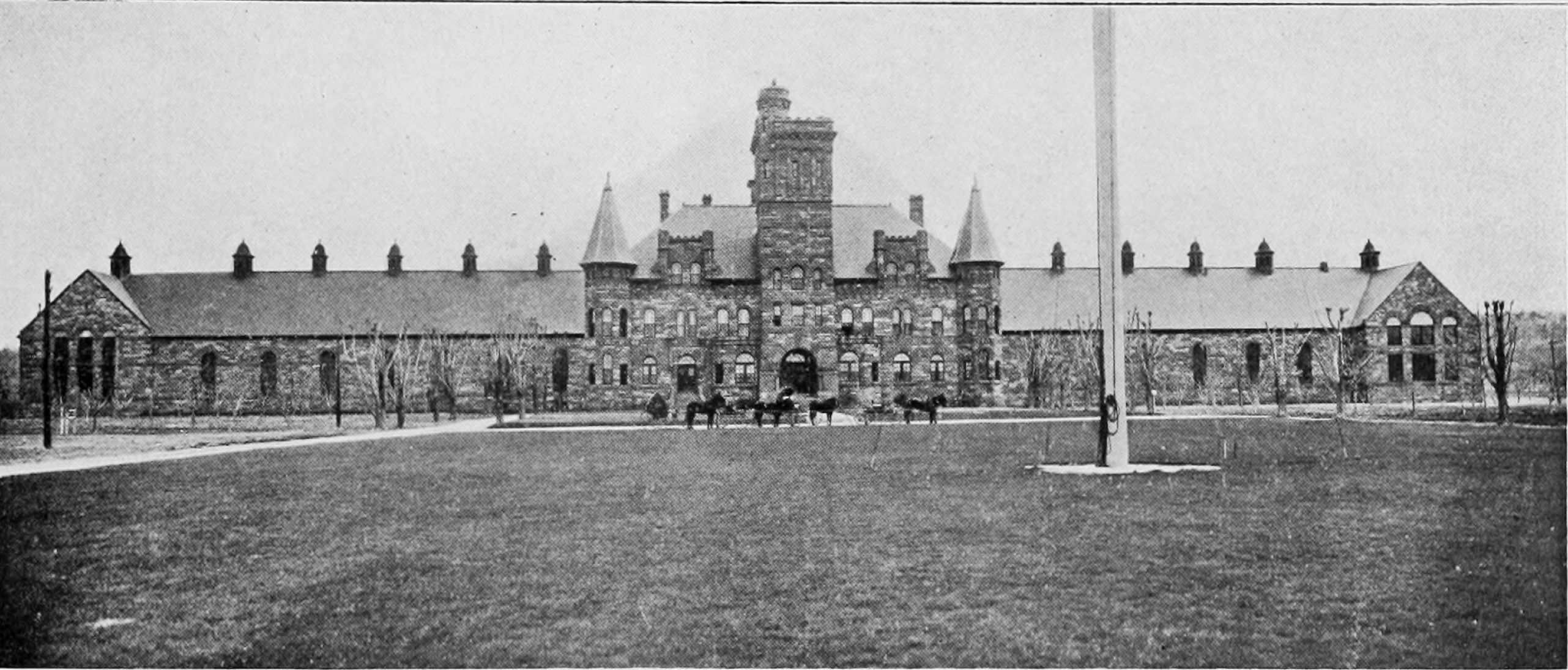
Marquette Branch Prison Marquette MI 1912

The original 1889 complex included the Administration Building, Rotunda, Cell Block A, and Cell Block B. Cell Block A was demolished in 1971, but the other buildings still remain. These buildings, designed by William Scott and Company of Detroit, form an imposing Richardsonian Romanesque complex constructed of local sandstone, with a contrasting red sandstone used for the stringcourses, cornices, window surrounds, arches, and tower battlements.

The Administration Building is a three-story structure measuring 112 feet by 56 feet, with a hipped roof. A central square tower which extends to a height of 88 feet, and contains a massive 10-foot wide Syrian entryway arch. The corners of the building contain octagonal bays topped by a pointed spire. Between the octagonal bays and the central tower are two wall dormers which project above the eave line. Round-arch windows are located on each story.

Behind the Administration Building, a corridor leads to the Rotunda, a semi-octagonal three-story structure measuring 75 by 75 foot, topped with a cupola. Two styles of arched windows are used on the rotunda. When it was constructed, the roof of the Rotunda was the largest and heaviest in the Upper Peninsula, and the original supporting timber and trusswork are still intact. Connected to the Rotunda is the one-story rectangular Cell Block B, which has arched windows along the sides and is five small cupolas used as air vents along the top.

In addition to the 1889 buildings, the prison complex includes a wing of 1923 cell blocks (blocks C, D, E, and F), a separate additive service building, a 1938 school, and a 1955 cell block extension. The 1971 Brooks Center Hospital adjoins the Rotunda, and stands where the original Cell Block A was located.

== 1800s ==
Governor Cyrus G. Luce appointed Orison C. Tompkins as the first warden. The selection angered many people in the Upper Peninsula because Tompkins was from the Lower Peninsula. Tompkins' first action was to get inmate tradesmen from the prison in Jackson, Michigan so they could start construction of additional buildings. The first three prisoners, William Durno, Horace Becker, and Gust Peterson, were transferred from the prison at Jackson on June 22, 1889.

Early prisoners provided an array of nationalities. Convict #4, Alphonse Hetu, was a French-Canadian; convict #5, Paddy Brennan, was from Ireland; and convict #6, Mattis Walli, was born in Finland and sentenced from New York. Women were also sentenced to MBP at this time and their work was in the kitchen, laundry room, hospital, and hosiery mill. In 1893, women were no longer sentenced to MBP but to the Detroit House of Corrections.

== 1900s ==
=== Warden Catlin's murder ===
In 1921 the sixth warden of MBP, Theodore Burr Catlin, was appointed. Soon after his appointment a grand jury began investigating the prison. The chief clerk was found guilty of embezzling prison funds. Then, September brought the escapes of three prisoners. First was Arthur "Gypsy Bob" Harper who escaped by hopping the fence. This was the first escape in seventeen years. Ten days later, two other convicts escaped over the same fence by using a ladder they had made from scrap lumber found in the prison yard that was being used during construction of additional cell blocks. All three convicts were caught and returned to MBP.

This was not the end of "Gypsy Bob's" trouble-making. On December 11, 1921, along with two other convicts (Jasper Perry and Charles Roberts), Gypsy Bob attacked Warden Catlin, Deputy Fred Menhennett, the deputy's son Arthur, and prison guard Charles Anderson in the prison movie theatre. The three convicts were armed with knives. They stabbed their four unsuspecting victims numerous times. The movie theatre was in total chaos, yet surprisingly, no other inmates got involved in the attacks. The main target of the three attackers was Warden Catlin who managed to close himself in a room until other prison guards were able to restore order and detain the three attackers. All four victims eventually died from complications caused by their knife wounds.

The attackers were flogged on three occasions. On Monday December 12, 1921 Harper and Perry received 30 lashes each and Roberts received 25 lashes. Then Perry and Roberts each received 25 more lashes each on Tuesday and Wednesday. Harper was not flogged because he was acting insane (smashing his head on the floor) and eventually put in a straitjacket to avoid other personal harm. The punishment of flogging was approved by the governor in certain cases such as this. The murder case was eventually dismissed because the flogging had served as their punishment. They could not be legally punished again because that would be considered "double jeopardy" so the state of Michigan no longer had a case against Harper, Perry, and Roberts. The three remained at MBP to serve out their life sentences with no further punishment. After the death of Warden Catlin, a prisoner was quoted as saying, "Warden Catlin was a man of intense courage. He was fair and just to everyone and compromised on nothing. Punishment was meted out when deserved, and encouragement when appropriate. He was everything a prison warden should be."

=== Escape attempts ===
In March 1922, five inmates attempted to escape through the roof of the west wing. They were successful, but were recaptured by prison officials soon after their escape. In May, "Slippery Jim" Cushway and two other inmates escaped while at work. The three escaped in a car that Leo Carney stole from a place near where he worked and picked up the other two on the way to Milwaukee. Cushway had escaped numerous times from prison. Many other escapes were successful in the 1920s. In April 1923, two fugitives, Steve Madaja and Russell Smith, escaped through the roof of the west wing and were never retrieved. On June 21, two inmates working at the prison lumber yard were found missing. George Bloochas and George Natchoff had escaped; Natchoff had stolen a .45 caliber automatic and about 40 rounds of ammunition. The hunt began for these two fugitives. Bloochas was captured first and he warned the police of the danger of Natchoff because of the weapon he possessed. During days of swamp battle, Natchoff shot many rounds, killing one deputy, Frank Curran, and injuring another. Eventually they killed Natchoff, who had a total of 14 bullet holes in his body. These escapes represent a few of many escapes that occurred during the 1920s at MBP. Also in the 1920s additional cell blocks were constructed as well as new boilers and a new dining hall that could seat around 500 inmates.

=== Dr. Hornbogen's murder ===
On August 27, 1931, three convicts (Andrew Germano, Charles Rosbury, Martin Duver) from Detroit opened fire in the hospital. The three first shot Doctor A.W. Hornbogen and then proceeded to the second level of an old factory and barricaded themselves. Exchange of fire continued for two hours. At one point a white flag was waived and a bottle with a note attached was thrown at the warden. The note read, "We have a bottle of explosives that will wreck this place, unless you give us a car and open the gates." The warden responded with "Start shooting again, boys!" Tear bombs were eventually used and the three mobsters killed themselves as they realized that their capture was inevitable.

The mobsters' motive seemed to be revenge on Dr. Hornbogen for the death of their friend, Fred Begeman, who had died of heart disease and kidney trouble under Dr. Hornbogen's watch. The three intended to escape, but their plan failed and the fatality list consisted of Dr. Hornbogen, Frank Oligschlager (trustee shot trying to help the doctor), Andrew Germano (convict), Charles Rosbury (convict), Martin Duver (convict), Frank Hohfer (convict who was armed but never engaged in the shoot-out and killed himself after his other three confederates killed themselves). This attempted escape caught national headlines, including The New York Times.

=== G. Mennen Williams prison incident ===
On July 8, 1950, G. Mennen Williams, the Governor of Michigan, was attacked and briefly held hostage while visiting the prison, as part of an inmate escape plot.

== 2000s ==
There are six level-V housing units surrounded by a twenty-foot stone wall and 10 feet of metal fencing. These units consist of single-prisoner cells and have a capacity of 546. The perimeter of the maximum security section is monitored by eight gun towers. Five of the eight towers have the capability to monitor activity inside the housing units.

There are four housing units for level-I inmates.These housing units are surrounded by two ten-foot barbed-wire metal fences, equipped with motion-activated sensors and 4K PTZ surveillance cameras. This section consists of four dormitories, O Dorm, A Dorm, N Dorm, and P Dorm. "Both A and N Dorms have full-size gymnasiums and classrooms in them while O and P Dorms have large recreational dayrooms. All level-I housing units are double bunked. The capacity of the level-I housing units is 670."

The Brooks Medical Center is an inpatient health care facility and outpatient clinic. There are more than 30 staff at the medical center, one doctor, two dentists, a dozen nurses, and several other support staff. There are two full service kitchens at MBP, a dairy farm, and a heating and power plant.

Programming at MBP currently consists of prisoner work assignments, psychological services, library services (MBP has one main law library and four other mini law libraries), a large volunteer program, religious, as well as recreation and educational programs. The programs provide inmates with opportunities to learn job skills, good habits, and good attitudes. The staff as MBP consists of 282 custody personnel and 145 other personnel.

== See also ==
- List of Michigan state prisons
