= Chippewa Correctional Facility =

Prison in Michigan, United States

Chippewa Correctional Facility (URF)
- Interactive map of Chippewa Correctional Facility (URF)
- Location: Kincheloe, Kinross Township, Chippewa County, Michigan; 46.2578°N 84.4550°W
- Status: Open
- Security class: Levels: I, II, IV, and Segregation.
- Capacity: 2440
- Opened: 1989
- Managed by: Michigan Department of Corrections
- Director: Heidi Washington

Chippewa Correctional Facility (URF) is a prison for men located in the Upper Peninsula (UP) of Michigan and part of the Michigan Department of Corrections (MDOC). The 3 letter designation for this facility is URF.

== General ==
The Chippewa Correctional Facility houses inmates with a security level of I, II, and IV. The facility contains 120 beds for security level I inmates, 2000 beds for security level II inmates, 192 beds for security level IV inmates, 32 beds for the Administrative unit, and 96 beds for a Detention unit.

== History ==
The facility opened in 1989. On August 9, 2009, the Straits Correctional Facility was closed and consolidated into the Chippewa Correctional Facility.

In August 2006, a small twin-engine plane crashed near the prison, hitting a fence approximately 20 feet (6.1 m) outside the facility's secure perimeter. While no one at the prison was injured, all four people on board the plane were killed in the crash.

== Directions ==
From I-75 exit onto M-80 (Kinross), the prison is located on the right side of the road.

== See also ==
- List of Michigan state prisons
