= Bellamy Creek Correctional Facility =

Prison in Michigan, United States

Bellamy Creek Correctional Facility (IBC)
- Interactive map of Bellamy Creek Correctional Facility (IBC)
- Location: Ionia, Michigan; 42.97796°N 85.10590°W
- Status: Open
- Security class: Levels I, II, and IV
- Opened: December 2001; 24 years ago
- Managed by: Michigan Department of Corrections
- Warden: Matt Macauley
- Website: Official website

Bellamy Creek Correctional Facility (IBC) is a prison in Ionia for men, run by the Michigan Department of Corrections.

== Facility ==
The prison was opened in December 2001 and is a multi-level facility used for Michigan Department of Corrections male prisoners 18 years of age and older. On-site facilities provide for food service, health care, facility maintenance, storage, and prison administration.

The facility is surrounded by two fences with razor-ribbon wire, and gun towers. Armed staff are also utilized to maintain perimeter security.

== Services ==
The facility offers a library, recreational activities, education programs, substance-abuse treatment, religious services, group psychotherapy, psychiatry, gardening, and individual therapy. Onsite medical care is supplemented by local medical facilities. The prison is an In-Reach Facility for the Michigan Prisoner Re-Entry Effort (MPRI). There is vocational training available in custodial maintenance technology and horticulture.

== See also ==
- List of Michigan state prisons
