= Women's Huron Valley Correctional Facility =

Prison in Michigan, United States

Women's Huron Valley Correctional Facility (WHV)
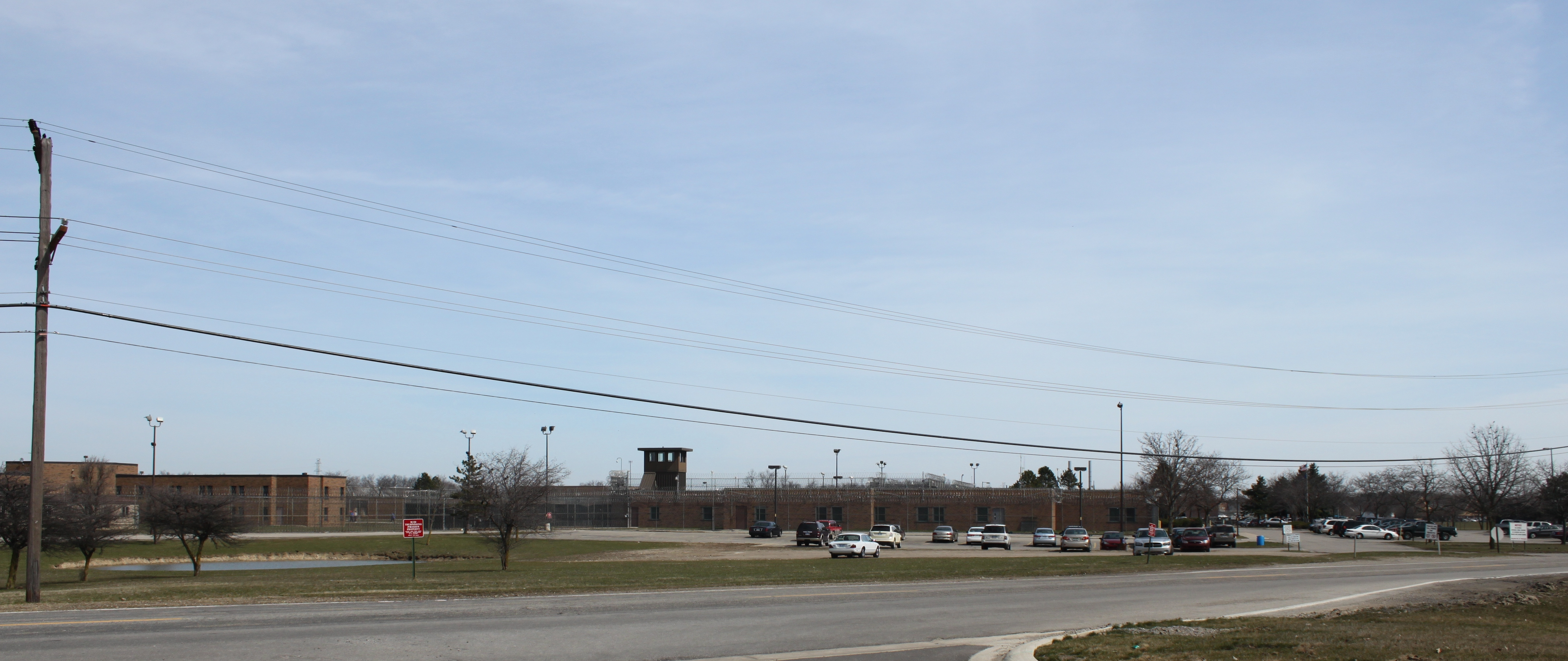
- Women's Huron Valley Correctional Facility
- Interactive map of Women's Huron Valley Correctional Facility (WHV)
- Location: Pittsfield Township, Michigan; 42°10′17″N 83°41′42″W
- Status: Open
- Security class: Levels: I, II and IV
- Capacity: 1100
- Opened: 1977
- Managed by: Michigan Department of Corrections
- Director: Warden Shawn Brewer

Women's Huron Valley Correctional Facility (WHV) is a prison for women located in Pittsfield Township, Michigan, operated by the Michigan Department of Corrections (MDOC). The three-letter designation for this facility is WHV. It is the only prison in Michigan which houses women.

== General ==
The prison is in Region 3, Washtenaw County, and houses security levels I, II and IV. It has two perimeter fences with electronic detection devices and security cameras, both audio and video. The facility is authorized 364 Correctional Officers, but is rarely at full strength. Only female guards are used in the housing units for fear of sexual assault by male staff members.

== History ==
The Women’s Huron Valley Correctional Facility (Previously named Huron Valley Women’s Complex) at 3511 Bemis Road, Ypsilanti 48197, opened its doors as a brand new facility on August 5, 1977, the day the Detroit House of Corrections in Plymouth on Five Mile Road closed for women permanently.

Huron Valley Women’s Facility was overcrowded as of day one. Four modular units had to be added to accommodate the overflow. (Mods: T-1, T-2, T-3 and T-4)

The Men’s prison had not yet been built when the women’s prison first opened. The men’s prison opened on August 20, 1981. The West Side of Huron Valley Women’s Facility was previously the old men’s prison, while the East side, was the original women’s side.

It included thirteen housing units for 1,100 inmates in the general population and housing for specialized programs. The prison shared personnel, prisoner records, maintenance operations and business offices with the adjacent Huron Valley Men's Complex, until that complex was closed in 2009 so that women could be moved in from the Robert Scotts Correctional Facility. At this time the facility name was changed from Huron Valley Women's Complex.

Capacity was increased by five hundred in 2010. Press reports in 2018 said the facility had a capacity of 2,400. At that time, the complex housed 2,100 people. The population reached a maximum of 2,257 in 2015.

The prison was the center of lawsuit concerning forced overtime by the guards. Two years later the state paid $750,000 to settle the matter.

Press reports in 2019 stated that the facility suffered from overcrowding and leaking roofs. Storage areas had been converted to housing units in violation of building codes.

== Women's Rights & Safety ==
The Michigan Department of Corrections was accused of sexually assaulting women in prisons. In 1996, many employees employed by the Michigan Department of Corrections were alleged to have sexually assaulted five female prisoners, including Tracy Neal, Tracy Neal et al. v. Michigan Department of Corrections et al. The class action suit named Neal/Nunn was filed by Deborah LaBelle, a prisoners' rights attorney. Tracy Neal was amongst the plaintiffs, where they alleged sexual assault by a male officer at the Scott Correctional Facility in 1994. Culley (2012) mentions how these incarcerated females Civil Rights were being violated, because prisoners were mistreated and were being asked to do inappropriate acts. These acts were rewarded with different opportunities for rehabilitation and education. The case went to court and was settled with a settlement after various jury trials. The settlement was $100 million and $30 million to the plaintiffs.

Before the Huron Valley Women's Facility was opened, a civil rights lawsuit was filed in 1977 on behalf of incarcerated females. The lawsuit alleged disparities in the prison industry; gender discrimination and a lack of education. These women had no knowledge of their lack of opportunities, they found out while communicating with their husbands or boyfriends. Mary Glover discovered this information when her husband mentioned how Jackson's prison had many training programs, heat, and education. When Glover was just starting her time at the Women's Division, Ernst (2021) talks about how there were unsanitary cottages and women had to shower underneath a sheet of ice in the winter. The Fourteenth Amendment was the ground to the claim, wanting to prohibit gender-based discrimination with the lawsuit Glover v. Johnson (1979).

Incarcerated females were coerced, gender norms were set by white, middle-class and upper-class men and women. Labella et al (2004) uses the term "Matrons", senior female prison guards who educate women about "womanly acts" such as cooking or sewing and were responsible for educating women on being good caregivers and mothers. Female and male prisoners were offered different classes and trainings. Male prisoners had vocational training for skilled trades and college degrees while women had home economic classes. Glover v. Johnson was ruled in favor of the plaintiffs, women were given the opportunity for rehabilitation and required education. Chief Judge John Feikens' "ORDERED that the State provide a post-secondary education program comparable to that available to male inmates to as many of the qualified inmates at the Huron Valley Women's Facility (Huron Valley) as desire to participate."

== Food rescue ==
Women in the prison's horticulture program operate a half-acre organic garden inside the prison which contributes 40% of the produce donated to the Washtenaw County Food Gatheres food rescue program.

== Notable inmates ==
- Gwendolyn Graham, serial killer
- Sharee Miller, murderer
- Nancy Seaman, murderer
- Tatiana Fusari, murderer
- Kelly Cochran - Murdered her lover Christopher Regan in 2014.
- Judy Boyer, mass murderer
- Jennifer Crumbley, mother of Oxford High School shooter, Ethan Crumbley

== See also ==
- List of Michigan state prisons
