= St. Louis, Michigan =

- City
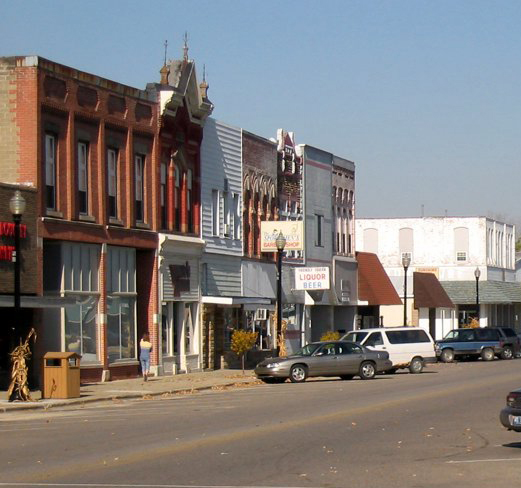
- St. Louis Downtown Historic District
- Motto: Middle of the Mitten
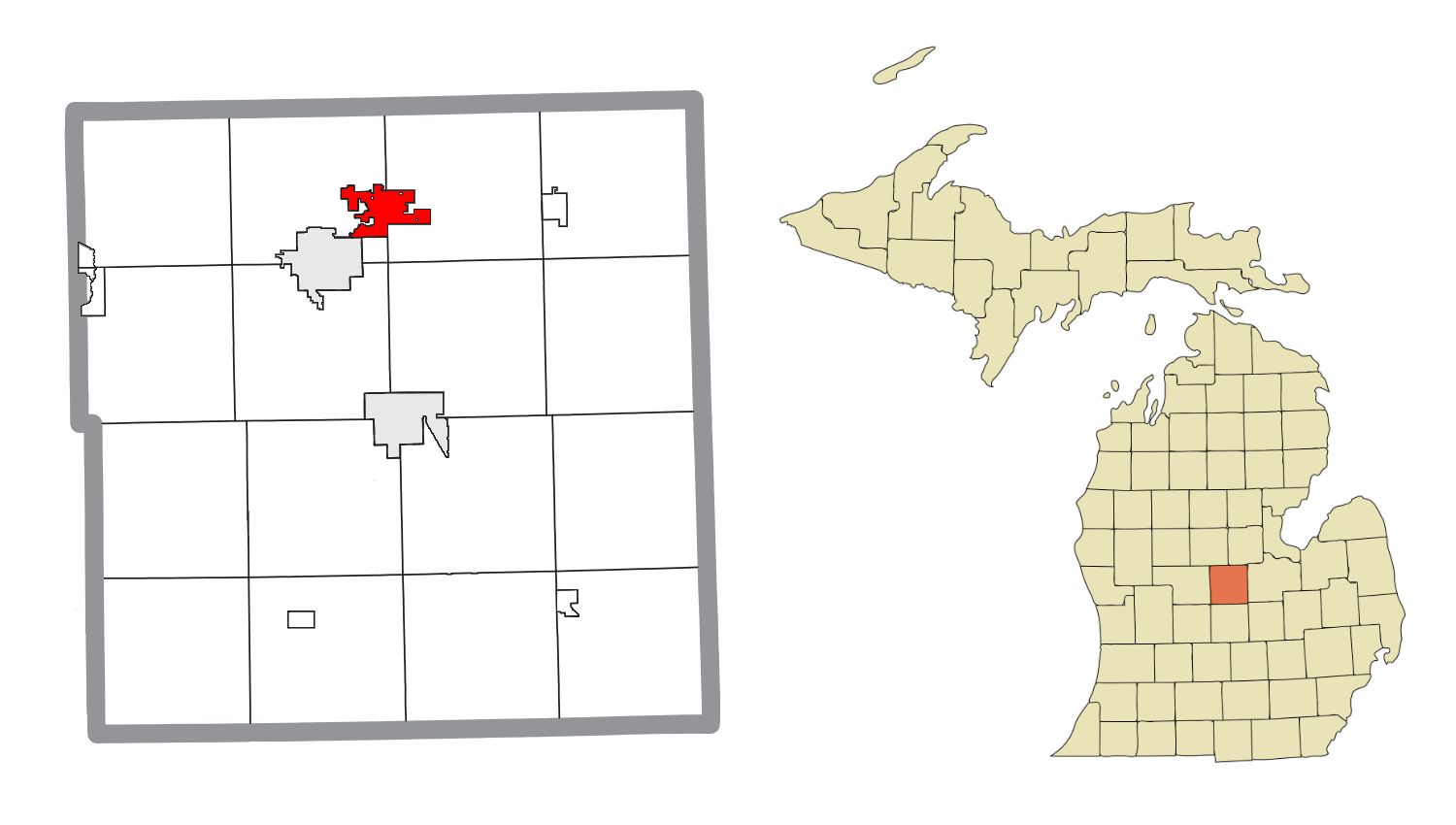
- Location within Gratiot County

- Location within the state of Michigan Location within the United States
- Coordinates: 43°24′31″N 84°36′41″W
- Country: United States
- State: Michigan
- County: Gratiot

Area
  - Total: 3.50 sq mi (9.06 km^{2})
  - Land: 3.32 sq mi (8.59 km^{2})
  - Water: 0.18 sq mi (0.47 km^{2})
- Elevation: 732 ft (223 m)

Population (2020)
  - Total: 7,010
  - Density: 2,114.8/sq mi (816.52/km^{2})
- Time zone: UTC-5 (Eastern (EST))
  - Summer (DST): UTC-4 (EDT)
- ZIP Code: 48880
- Area code: 989
- FIPS code: 26-71000
- GNIS feature ID: 0636831
- Website: www.stlouismi.com

St. Louis is a city in Gratiot County in the U.S. state of Michigan. As of the 2020 census the population was 7,010.

== Geography ==
According to the United States Census Bureau, the city has a total area of 3.53 square miles (9.14 km^{2}), of which 3.34 square miles (8.65 km^{2}) is land and 0.19 square miles (0.49 km^{2}) is water.

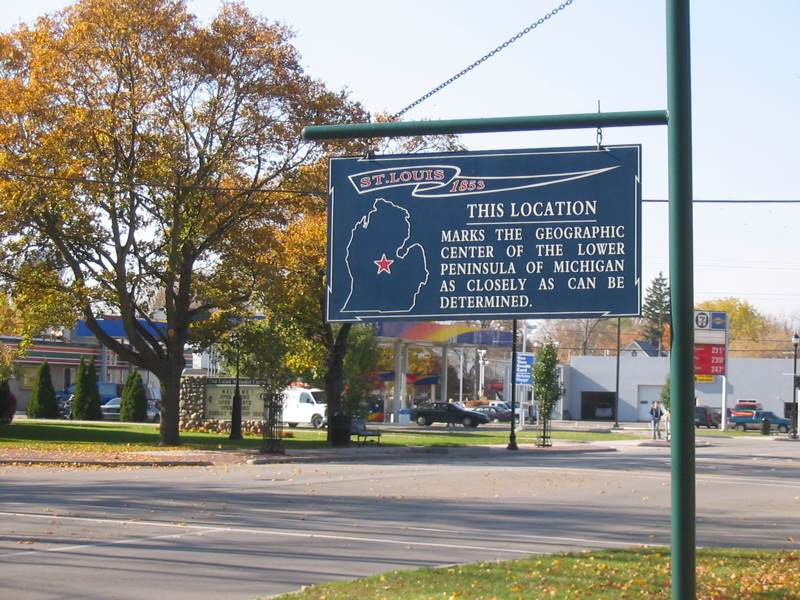
A sign in central St. Louis marks the "Middle of the Mitten".

It was long recognized that St. Louis sits at the geographic center of Michigan's lower peninsula "as closely as can be determined." A campaign by Clarence and Odessa Smazel in the early 1950s, owners of the St. Louis Leader-Press, a now-defunct local newspaper, resulted in the State of Michigan designating it as such: a sign in Clapp Park on Highway M-46 denotes the city as the official "Middle of the Mitten."

== History ==
Indigenous people lived in this area for thousands of years before European contact. The French were early explorers in present-day Michigan. They established fur trading with the historic First Nations and Native American nations. By the 18th century, the Ojibwe were the dominant tribe in present-day Michigan. After the Seven Years' War, France was forced to cede its New France territory to the victorious English, who increased fur trade at Sault Ste. Marie. After the rebellious colonists' victory in the American Revolutionary War, the territory changed hands again, being ceded to the new United States.

It was not until the mid-19th century that much European-American settlement reached this area. In 1848 missionaries established the Bethany Lutheran Mission to serve local American Indians, mostly Anishinaabe-speaking Ojibwe (also known in the US as Chippewa). Following a Native American path to the mission, the European-American Joseph W. Clapp came to the area in 1853, where he built the first house of present-day St. Louis. Over 150 years later, the Mission still stands near Main Street Bridge across the Pine River.

By the late nineteenth century, the discovery of mineral springs made St. Louis a destination for people seeking the health benefits of local mineral-rich water, which had the added feature of magnetizing steel. Famous guests who credited the water with cures included detective Allan Pinkerton and Civil War general "Fighting Joe" Hooker. The Park Hotel became noted as a health spa, and for its duck dinners as well.

St. Louis is the site of the former Michigan Chemical Corporation plant, which helped market and produce DDT as a widely commercial product. After its purchase by Velsicol Chemical Corporation, the plant was responsible for a product mixup in the 1970s. This resulted in contamination of cattle feed with PBB, a flame retardant. The feed was distributed throughout Michigan and the Midwest. The mixup occurred due what was described as a "triple witching hour" of events: a labor strike with management's replacing regular workers; a shortage of bags that helped distinguish between cattle feed additive and the flame-retardant PBB; and storing both the cattle feed and the fire retardant in the same dimly lit warehouse.

Dredging has been underway for years to remove contaminants from the Pine River, which runs alongside the property where the plant was located. Although the plant was disassembled years ago, the land remains vacant to this day.

St. Louis has gained some jobs by inviting the State of Michigan to build a minimum-security prison between Union and Croswell Roads (Pine River Correctional Facility), on the former Reichard "Rainbow Trail" hatchery property.

== Demographics ==
Historical population
| Census | Pop. | Note | %± |
|---|---|---|---|
| 1870 | 888 | | — |
| 1880 | 1,975 | | 122.4% |
| 1890 | 2,246 | | 13.7% |
| 1900 | 1,989 | | −11.4% |
| 1910 | 1,940 | | −2.5% |
| 1920 | 3,036 | | 56.5% |
| 1930 | 2,494 | | −17.9% |
| 1940 | 3,039 | | 21.9% |
| 1950 | 3,347 | | 10.1% |
| 1960 | 3,808 | | 13.8% |
| 1970 | 4,101 | | 7.7% |
| 1980 | 4,107 | | 0.1% |
| 1990 | 3,828 | | −6.8% |
| 2000 | 4,494 | | 17.4% |
| 2010 | 7,482 | | 66.5% |
| 2020 | 7,010 | | −6.3% |
U.S. Decennial Census

=== 2020 census ===
As of the 2020 census, St. Louis had a population of 7,010. The median age was 37.2 years. 12.7% of residents were under the age of 18 and 12.6% of residents were 65 years of age or older. For every 100 females there were 252.8 males, and for every 100 females age 18 and over there were 293.2 males age 18 and over.

96.7% of residents lived in urban areas, while 3.3% lived in rural areas.

There were 1,544 households in St. Louis, of which 28.8% had children under the age of 18 living in them. Of all households, 38.3% were married-couple households, 19.4% were households with a male householder and no spouse or partner present, and 31.9% were households with a female householder and no spouse or partner present. About 32.9% of all households were made up of individuals and 15.5% had someone living alone who was 65 years of age or older.

There were 1,677 housing units, of which 7.9% were vacant. The homeowner vacancy rate was 2.1% and the rental vacancy rate was 8.0%.

Racial composition as of the 2020 census
| Race | Number | Percent |
|---|---|---|
| White | 4,837 | 69.0% |
| Black or African American | 1,673 | 23.9% |
| American Indian and Alaska Native | 49 | 0.7% |
| Asian | 25 | 0.4% |
| Native Hawaiian and Other Pacific Islander | 1 | 0.0% |
| Some other race | 153 | 2.2% |
| Two or more races | 272 | 3.9% |
| Hispanic or Latino (of any race) | 513 | 7.3% |

=== 2010 census ===
As of the census of 2010, there were 7,482 people, 1,491 households, and 937 families residing in the city. (This includes an institutionalized population of 3,823, mostly in Pine River Correctional Facility.) The population density was 2,240.1 inhabitants per square mile (864.9/km^{2}). There were 1,638 housing units at an average density of 490.4 per square mile (189.3/km^{2}). The racial makeup of the city was 67.7% White, 29.1% African American, 0.6% Native American, 0.2% Asian, 1.3% from other races, and 1.0% from two or more races. Hispanic or Latino of any race were 5.7% of the population.

There were 1,491 households, of which 34.6% had children under the age of 18 living with them, 41.2% were married couples living together, 16.8% had a female householder with no husband present, 4.8% had a male householder with no wife present, and 37.2% were non-families. 31.6% of all households were made up of individuals, and 13.7% had someone living alone who was 65 years of age or older. The average household size was 2.45 and the average family size was 3.04.

The median age in the city was 36.1 years. 13.5% of residents were under the age of 18; 12.4% were between the ages of 18 and 24; 41.3% were from 25 to 44; 24.1% were from 45 to 64; and 8.9% were 65 years of age or older. The gender makeup of the city was 72.7% male and 27.3% female.

=== 2000 census ===
As of the census of 2000, there were 4,494 people, 1,468 households, and 964 families residing in the city. The population density was 1,568.4 inhabitants per square mile (605.6/km^{2}). There were 1,575 housing units at an average density of 549.7 per square mile (212.2/km^{2}). The racial makeup of the city was 83.00% White, 10.08% African American, 1.02% Native American, 0.31% Asian, 2.74% from other races, and 2.85% from two or more races. Hispanic or Latino of any race were 7.50% of the population.

There were 1,468 households, out of which 31.5% had children under the age of 18 living with them, 47.6% were married couples living together, 13.4% had a female householder with no husband present, and 34.3% were non-families. 29.5% of all households were made up of individuals, and 12.6% had someone living alone who was 65 years of age or older. The average household size was 2.39 and the average family size was 2.92.

In the city, the population was spread out, with 20.6% under the age of 18, 12.1% from 18 to 24, 35.0% from 25 to 44, 20.9% from 45 to 64, and 11.4% who were 65 years of age or older. The median age was 35 years. For every 100 females, there were 142.5 males. For every 100 females age 18 and over, there were 155.6 males.

The median income for a household in the city was $31,122, and the median income for a family was $39,271. Males had a median income of $29,028 versus $19,272 for females. The per capita income for the city was $14,196. About 10.1% of families and 15.9% of the population were below the poverty line, including 19.9% of those under age 18 and 10.7% of those age 65 or over.

== Transportation ==
- US 127
- Bus. US 127
- M-46

== Notable people ==
- Archibald Bard Darragh (1840–1927), Member of Congress from 1901 to 1909, lived in St. Louis from 1870 until the time of his death. He was a banker and was elected mayor in 1893.
- Edward Hartwick (1871–1918), United States Army officer, businessman and namesake of Michigan's Hartwick Pines State Park, was born and reared here.
- Jim Northrup (1939–2011), outfielder for the Detroit Tigers 1964–1974, including a major role on its World Championship 1968 team, was born in nearby Breckenridge, Michigan, then moved to St. Louis, where he graduated from high school.
- Bradbury Robinson (1884–1949), who threw the first forward pass in football history, lived in St. Louis from September 1926 until his death in March 1949. Dr. Robinson founded the Robinson Clinic on N. East St. in 1935 and was twice elected mayor, in 1931 and 1937.
- Lester "Tug" Wilson (1885–1969), who played briefly for the Boston Red Sox during the 1911 season, was born in St. Louis.
- Joseph Marion Nako (1917 – 2011)
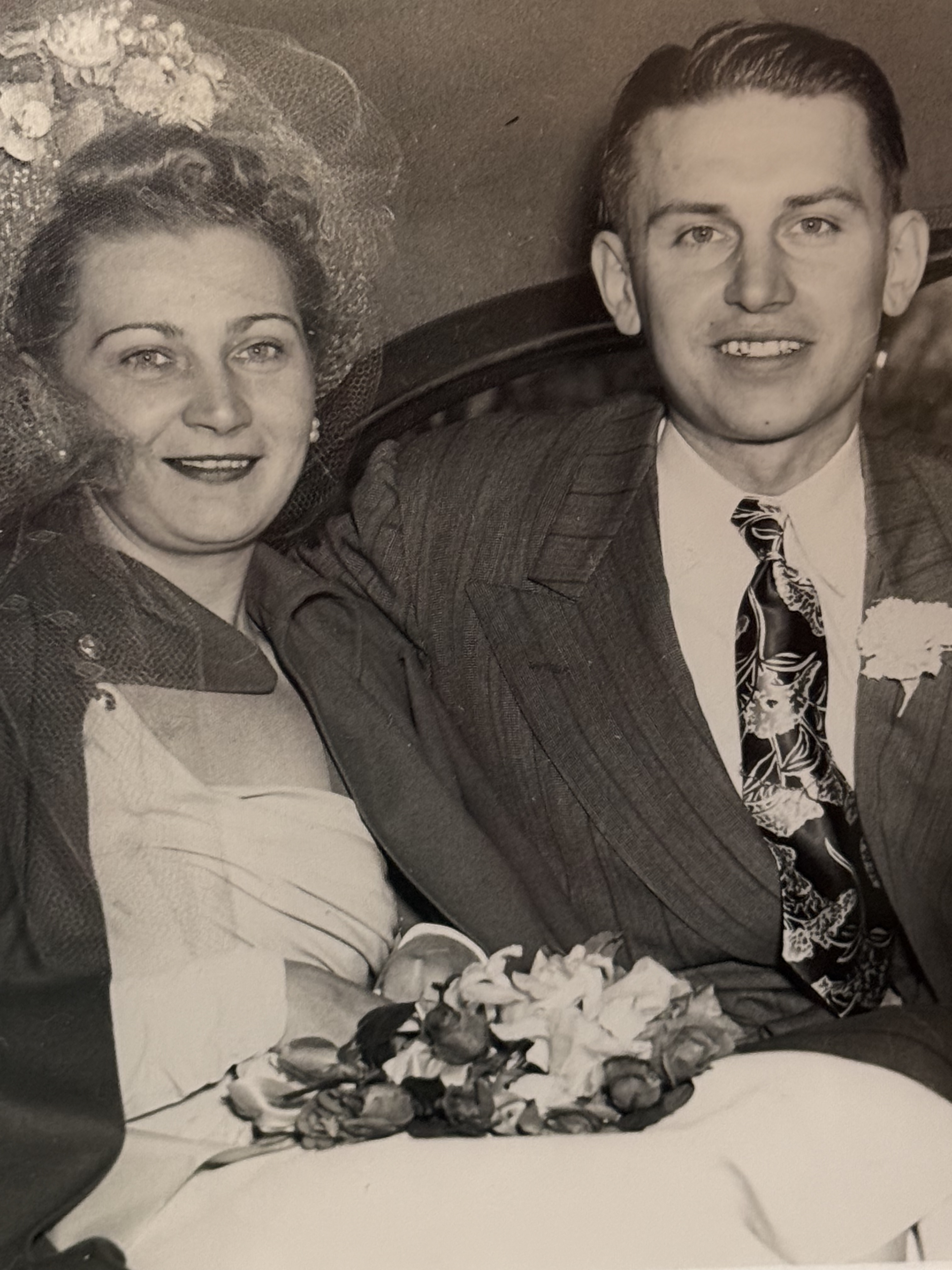
  Wedding day
  was an American restaurateur, World War II veteran, and longtime resident of St. Louis, Michigan. In 1957, he and his wife, Pauline Nako, founded The Dandy Drive-In Restaurant, which they operated for nearly 30 years. The restaurant became a beloved local landmark, known for its broasted chicken and homemade pies, as well as its distinctive fiberglass chicken mascot that became a recognizable symbol of the establishment and city.
