= Kincheloe, Michigan =

- Census-designated place (CDP) & unincorporated community
- Location within the state of Michigan
- Coordinates: 46°16′08″N 84°27′25″W
- Country: United States
- State: Michigan
- County: Chippewa
- Township: Kinross

Area
  - Total: 1.27 sq mi (3.28 km^{2})
  - Land: 1.27 sq mi (3.28 km^{2})
  - Water: 0 sq mi (0.00 km^{2})
- Elevation: 797 ft (243 m)

Population (2020)
  - Total: 2,587
  - Density: 2,043.7/sq mi (789.08/km^{2})
- Time zone: UTC-5 (Eastern (EST))
  - Summer (DST): UTC-4 (EDT)
- ZIP code(s): 49788
- Area code: 906
- FIPS code: 26-43180
- GNIS feature ID: 2806322

Kincheloe is an unincorporated community and census-designated place (CDP) in Chippewa County on the Upper Peninsula of the U.S. state of Michigan, named after the former Kincheloe Air Force Base, that was in turn named after noted pilot Iven Kincheloe.

As of the 2020 census, Kincheloe had a population of 2,587.

Kincheloe is at the eastern end of Kinross Charter Township, just east of Interstate 75 (I-75) and approximately 20 miles (32 km) southwest of Sault Ste. Marie and 37 miles (60 km) north of St. Ignace. It is on the area formerly occupied by the Kincheloe Air Force Base, which covered 7,265 acres (29.40 km^{2}).

Despite the loss of approximately 10,000 personnel living in the area after the base closure in 1977, the town has managed to survive the years since closing, largely due to the development of several prisons in the area, some growth in light industry and an airport that continues to use some of the runways built for the Air Force Base.

Chippewa County International Airport, Kinross Correctional Facility, Chippewa Correctional Facility, Kinross Manufacturing, American Kinross, Inc. are now located on the base's former property and adjacent land. In all, the local tax base had doubled, and the civilian payroll created by the new ventures had reached $110 million.

The town is also home to The Oaks at Kincheloe, formerly The Kincheloe Memorial Golf Course, an 18-hole, par 72, 7,000-yard (6,400 m) course built as a nine-hole course by the base in 1951 and expanded in 1987.

== Demographics ==
Historical population
| Census | Pop. | Note | %± |
|---|---|---|---|
| 2020 | 2,587 | | — |
U.S. Decennial Census

=== 2020 census ===
As of the 2020 census, Kincheloe had a population of 2,587. The median age was 31.8 years. 31.2% of residents were under the age of 18 and 9.7% of residents were 65 years of age or older. For every 100 females there were 99.6 males, and for every 100 females age 18 and over there were 98.5 males age 18 and over.

95.5% of residents lived in urban areas, while 4.5% lived in rural areas.

There were 879 households in Kincheloe, of which 43.8% had children under the age of 18 living in them. Of all households, 41.4% were married-couple households, 19.5% were households with a male householder and no spouse or partner present, and 25.5% were households with a female householder and no spouse or partner present. About 21.0% of all households were made up of individuals and 8.2% had someone living alone who was 65 years of age or older.

There were 1,010 housing units, of which 13.0% were vacant. The homeowner vacancy rate was 1.4% and the rental vacancy rate was 9.4%.

Racial composition as of the 2020 census
| Race | Number | Percent |
|---|---|---|
| White | 1,473 | 56.9% |
| Black or African American | 31 | 1.2% |
| American Indian and Alaska Native | 689 | 26.6% |
| Asian | 14 | 0.5% |
| Native Hawaiian and Other Pacific Islander | 0 | 0.0% |
| Some other race | 11 | 0.4% |
| Two or more races | 369 | 14.3% |
| Hispanic or Latino (of any race) | 81 | 3.1% |

== Major highways ==
- I-75
- M-80
- H-63 (Mackinac Trail)
