= Duane L. Waters Hospital =

Duane Leonard Waters Hospital
- Michigan Department of Corrections
- Shown in Michigan

Geography
- Location: Michigan State Prison, Jackson, Michigan, United States
- Coordinates: 42.29834°N 84.38775°W

Organization
- Type: Prison

Services
- Beds: 112

History
- Founded: May 1986

Links
- Lists: Hospitals in Michigan

The Duane Leonard Waters Hospital (DWH) is a 112 inpatient bed hospital located within the former Michigan State Prison complex in Blackman Charter Township, Michigan and used for prison inmates and workers. The facility is owned and operated by the Michigan Department of Corrections. It primarily treats inmates whose medical needs cannot be treated at other Michigan Department of Corrections facilities.

== History ==
The hospital opened in May 1986 and was the first hospital opened by the Michigan Department of Corrections.

The facility is named after Dr. Duane Leonard Waters, who worked with the Michigan Corrections Commission for 25 years to modernize health care for Michigan prisons and was an influential advocate of the hospital being built.

== Services ==
The hospital provides acute medical, outpatient, surgical, and long-term care in a secure facility. The hospital also administers a program outside the facility for 64 extended-care patients whose needs could not be met by general prison facilities, but do not require inpatient care at the hospital.

== See also ==
- List of hospitals in Michigan
