= Michigan Department of Corrections =

Government branch over Michigan's prisons

Department of Corrections

- Seal of the Michigan Department of Corrections
- Abbreviation: MDOC
- Motto: "Committed to Protect, Dedicated to Success"

Agency overview
- Formed: 1953
- Preceding agency: Prison Commission
- Employees: 14,000(2017)
- Annual budget: $2 Billion (2025)

Jurisdictional structure
- Operations jurisdiction: Michigan, United States|USA
- Map of Department of Corrections's jurisdiction
- Area: 97,990 square miles (253,800 km^{2})
- Population: 10,077,331 (2020 Census)

Operational structure
- Headquarters: Lansing, Michigan
- Agency executives: Heidi Washington, Director; Jeremy Bush, Deputy Director of the Correctional Facilities Administration; Russ Marlan, Deputy Director of the Field Operations Administration; Julie Hamp, Deputy Director of the Budget and Operations Administration
- Child agencies: Correctional Facilities Administration; Field Operations Administration; Budget and Operations Administration

Website
- michigan.gov/corrections

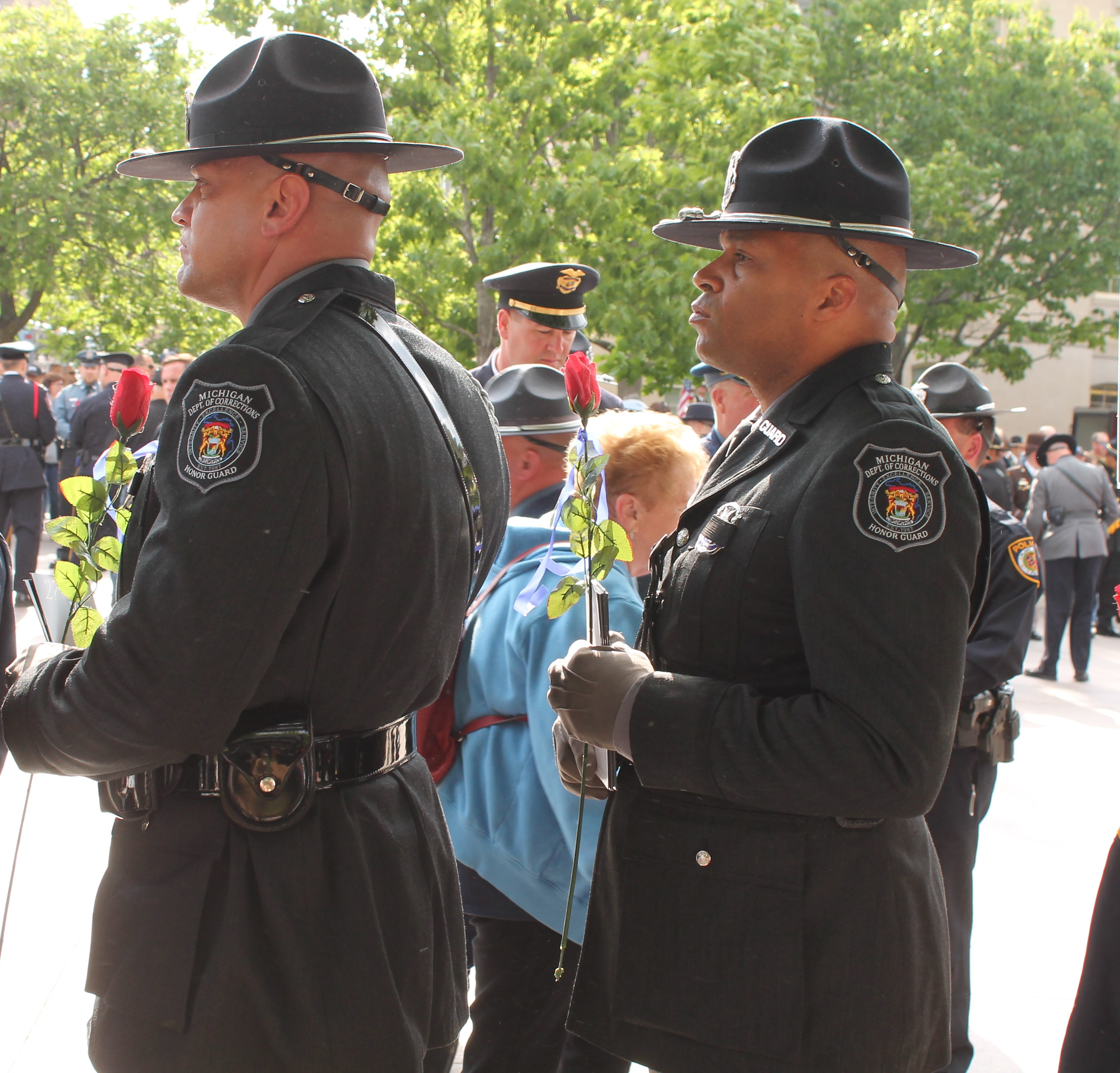
Michigan Department of Corrections Honor Guard at assembly before 27th Annual Candlelight Vigil at National Law Enforcement Officers Memorial in Washington, D.C.

The Michigan Department of Corrections (MDOC) oversees prisons and the parole and probation population in the state of Michigan, United States. It has 31 prison facilities, and a Special Alternative Incarceration program, together composing approximately 41,000 prisoners. Another 71,000 probationers and parolees are under its supervision. (2015 figures) The agency has its headquarters in Grandview Plaza in Lansing.

== History ==
MDOC previously contracted with Aramark for its food services. On July 13, 2015 it announced that it was switching to Trinity Services Group.

Many incarcerated women have spoken out regarding their experiences in prisons. The sources mainly come from Tracy Neal v. Michigan Department of Corrections (2012) and Glover v. Johnson (1979). This information can be found on the Women's Huron Valley Correctional Facility page.

== Divisions ==
=== Correctional Facilities Administration ===
The state secure-facilities network supervises a diverse offender population. The physical plants also span centuries, from the Michigan Reformatory in Ionia (built in the late 1870s) to the modern Bellamy Creek Correctional Facility, which was completed in 2001.

=== Prisons ===
As of January 2017, thirty-one DOC facilities are open and in operation.

The prisons are categorized into different security levels. A Secure Level I facility houses prisoners who are more easily managed within the network (even though they may have committed violent crimes). The state's Level V prisons house prisoners who pose maximum management problems, are a maximum security risk, or both. Prisons may have more than one security level.

=== Field Operations Administration ===
The Field Operations Administration (FOA) is responsible for state probation and parole supervision as well as other methods of supervision, including the parole board. It also oversees the Detroit Detention Center and the Detroit Reentry Center. There are 105 field offices across the state.

=== Operations Support Administration ===
The Operations Support Administration is responsible for oversight of departmental finances, personnel services - including training and recruitment of new employees, policy development, labor relations, and physical plant and environmental services.

== See also ==
- List of law enforcement agencies in Michigan
- List of Michigan state prisons

National:

- List of United States state correction agencies
