= Lumen Christi Catholic School =

Location
- 3483 Spring Arbor Road; Jackson, Michigan 49203; United States; 42°13′22″N 84°27′26″W

Information
- Type: Private, Coeducational
- Motto: Live Jesus
- Religious affiliation: Roman Catholic Diocese of Lansing
- Established: 1968
- Oversight: Jackson Area Catholic Schools
- Superintendent: Stephen Rajzer
- Principal: Ben Learned
- Chaplain: Randy Koenigsknecht
- Teaching staff: 39.1 (FTE)
- Grades: 7–12
- Enrollment: 302 (2023-2024)
- Student to teacher ratio: 11.4
- Colors: Green and Gold
- Fight song: Lumen Christi Fight Song (to the tune of Mr. Touchdown USA)
- Athletics conference: Catholic High School League
- Mascot: Titey the Titan
- Nickname: Titans
- Rival: Jackson High School, Northwest High School
- Newspaper: The Titan Times
- Yearbook: Chi Rho
- School fees: $65 yearly enrollment fee
- Tuition: $10,280
- Website: School website

Lumen Christi Catholic School is a private Roman Catholic high school located in Summit Township, just outside Jackson, Michigan, in the United States. Located in the Roman Catholic Diocese of Lansing, it was established in 1968 from the merger of St. Mary's and St. John's Catholic High Schools.

== History ==
Lumen Christi Catholic High School was opened in 1968 as a result of merging St. John and St. Mary High Schools. Lumen Christi is under the direction of the Bishop of Lansing, through the Diocesan Board of Education, and advised by the Policy Committee and the Financial Planning Committee. It is supported and maintained by the following local Catholic Parishes: St. John the Evangelist/St. Joseph Parish, St. Mary Star of the Sea/St. Stanislaus Kostka Parish, Queen of the Miraculous Medal Parish, Our Lady of Fatima Parish in Michigan Center, St Rita Parish in Clark Lake, St. Catherine Laboure Parish in Concord, and St. John the Evangelist Parish in Albion. The total area of the school encompasses 172,700 square feet. A Resource Center and Library with seating capacity of 265 is located in the center of the school. The 180-foot diameter domed gymnasium seats 3000 people for athletic and community events along with a wrestling and weight room. The cafetorium (combined cafeteria and auditorium) with complete kitchen facilities, accommodates 500 for dining and approximately 700 for assemblies or other social functions. The chapel is used for daily mass and special masses and services.

Jackson Catholic Middle School moved to Lumen Christi's campus at the start of the 2014–2015 school year. With the move, the school is divided into two wings, one for Lumen Christi and the other for JCMS, with the cafetorium, choir room, band room, and gymnasiums shared.

In 2015, James Francis Rapp was charged by the Michigan Attorney General with 13 counts of criminal sexual conduct for crimes he committed while a priest, teacher, maintenance supervisor and wrestling coach at Lumen Christi from 1980 to 1986. At the time the Michigan charges were filed, Rapp was already serving a 40-year sentence for similar crimes in Oklahoma. Rapp pleaded no contest to 3 counts of first degree criminal sexual conduct and 3 counts of second degree criminal sexual conduct in return for the other charges being dropped. He was sentenced to an additional 20–40 years in prison by the Michigan court on top of the Oklahoma sentence. At the sentencing hearing, victims testified that they attempted to report the abuse at the time to Fr. Joseph Coyle, the original principal of the high school, but Coyle insisted that they do so in confession rather than in a formal hearing or office meeting. Coyle then admonished them that what was said in confession could not be repeated and that they would "go to hell" if they did so. Coyle did not report the abuse to authorities, but Rapp was quietly transferred. Rapp was sent to a month-long evaluation at the Saint Luke Institute, which concluded:

The diagnosis of fixated ephebophilia – that is a sexual attraction to adolescent boys – can be made without equivocation. It is clear from Father Rapp's history that his ephebophiliac behavior extends over many years and with a number of contacts. It is very important that Father Rapp not be in the presence of youth without another responsible adult there.

Afterwards, he was transferred to other parishes, including the Oklahoma parish where he committed the later crimes. In the wake of the revelation of Coyle's complicity in Rapp's crimes, Coyle's name was removed from the fundraising charity for the school, the Fr. Coyle Society, out of consideration for Rapp's victims.

== Demographics ==
When the high school opened in 1968, it was designed to accommodate over 1,000 students. At that time, the total enrollment of the high school and middle school was nearly 1,700. By 2013, when the consolidation of the two schools was announced, enrollment had dropped by nearly 2/3 over 45 years, with the high school enrollment at 412, and the combined schools' enrollment anticipated to be just over 600.

As of the 2023-2024 academic year, the enrollment of the high school was 292, and the total enrollment of the middle school was 158, with the following demographic breakdown of the total enrollment of 450:

- Asian – 2.2% (10)
- Black – 2.8% (13)
- Hispanic – 4.6% (21)
- Native Hawaiian/Pacific Islander – 0% (0)
- Native American – 0% (0)
- White – 86.6% (371)
- Multiracial – 3.5% (16)

== Academics ==
Lumen Christi currently offers eight Advanced Placement (AP) courses: AP Calculus AB, AP Chemistry, AP United States Government and Politics, AP English Language and Composition, AP English Literature and Composition, AP Psychology, AP United States History, AP World History: Modern.

== Athletics ==
The athletic teams are known as the Titans and are members of the Catholic High School League Athletic Conference for all sports. The Titans have a total of 57 state championships in nine sports. The following MHSAA sanctioned sports are offered:

- Baseball (boys)
  - State champs – 1978, 2015
- Basketball (boys & girls)
  - Girls state champs- 2026
- Bowling (boys & girls)
- Competitive cheerleading (girls)
- Cross country (boys & girls)
  - Boys state champs – 1979, 2012
  - Girls state champs – 1982, 1983, 1984, 1986, 1990, 1991, 2006, 2007, 2012, 2023
- Football (boys)
  - State champs – 1977, 1979, 1996, 2000, 2001, 2003, 2004, 2009, 2016, 2017, 2018, 2022, 2023, 2024, 2025
- Golf (boys & girls)
  - Boys state champs – 1978, 1979, 1981, 1982, 1983, 1984, 1985, 1986, 1990, 1991, 2009, 2010, 2011, 2012, 2017
  - Girls state champs – 1989, 1992, 1995, 2003, 2004, 2022
- Gymnastics (girls)
- Ice hockey (boys)
  - State champs – 1977, 1978
- Soccer (boys & girls)
  - Boys state champs – 2003 (tied)
  - Girls state champs – 2024
- Softball (girls)
- Swim & dive (boys & girls)
- Tennis (boys & girls)
  - Boys state champs - 2026
- Track and field (boys & girls)
  - Boys state champs – 2015
- Volleyball (girls)
- Wrestling (boys)

== Notable alumni ==
- Ryan LaMarre baseball player
- Dominic Pangborn artist and graphic designer
- Khari Willis football player
