= Vandercook Lake Public Schools =

School district in Michigan, United States

Address
- 1000 East Golf Avenue Jackson, Jackson County, Michigan, 49203; United States

District information
- Motto: Believe. Achieve. Soar.
- Grades: PreKindergarten–12
- Superintendent: Melissa Bradfield
- Schools: 3
- Budget: $13,006,000 2022–2023 expenditures
- NCES District ID: 2634650

Students and staff
- Students: 629 (2024–2025)
- Teachers: 36.39 (on an FTE basis) (2024–2025)
- Staff: 93.91 FTE (2024–2025)
- Student–teacher ratio: 17.28 (2024–2025)
- District mascot: Jayhawks

Other information
- Website: www.vandyschools.org

Vandercook Lake Public Schools is a public school district in Jackson County, Michigan. It serves part of Vandercook Lake and parts of Summit Township.

== History ==
Vandercook Lake's school was called Draper School prior to 1922, and it did not include a high school. That year, a new high school was built so that students did not have to go to high school in Jackson. The first class graduated in 1926. The building was expanded in 1931.

A dedication and open house for the current middle/high school was held on May 28, 1961. Kressbach and Dabbert was the architecture firm.

== Schools ==
Schools in Vandercook Lake Public Schools district
School	Address	Notes
Vandercook Lake Middle/High School	1000 E. Golf Ave., Jackson	Grades 7–12
Townsend Elementary	1005 Floyd Ave., Jackson	Grades PreK-6
Vandercook Lake Virtual Academy	1000 E. Golf Ave., Jackson	Online school for grades 1-12.
