= Vandercook Lake, Michigan =

- Census-designated place (CDP) & unincorporated community
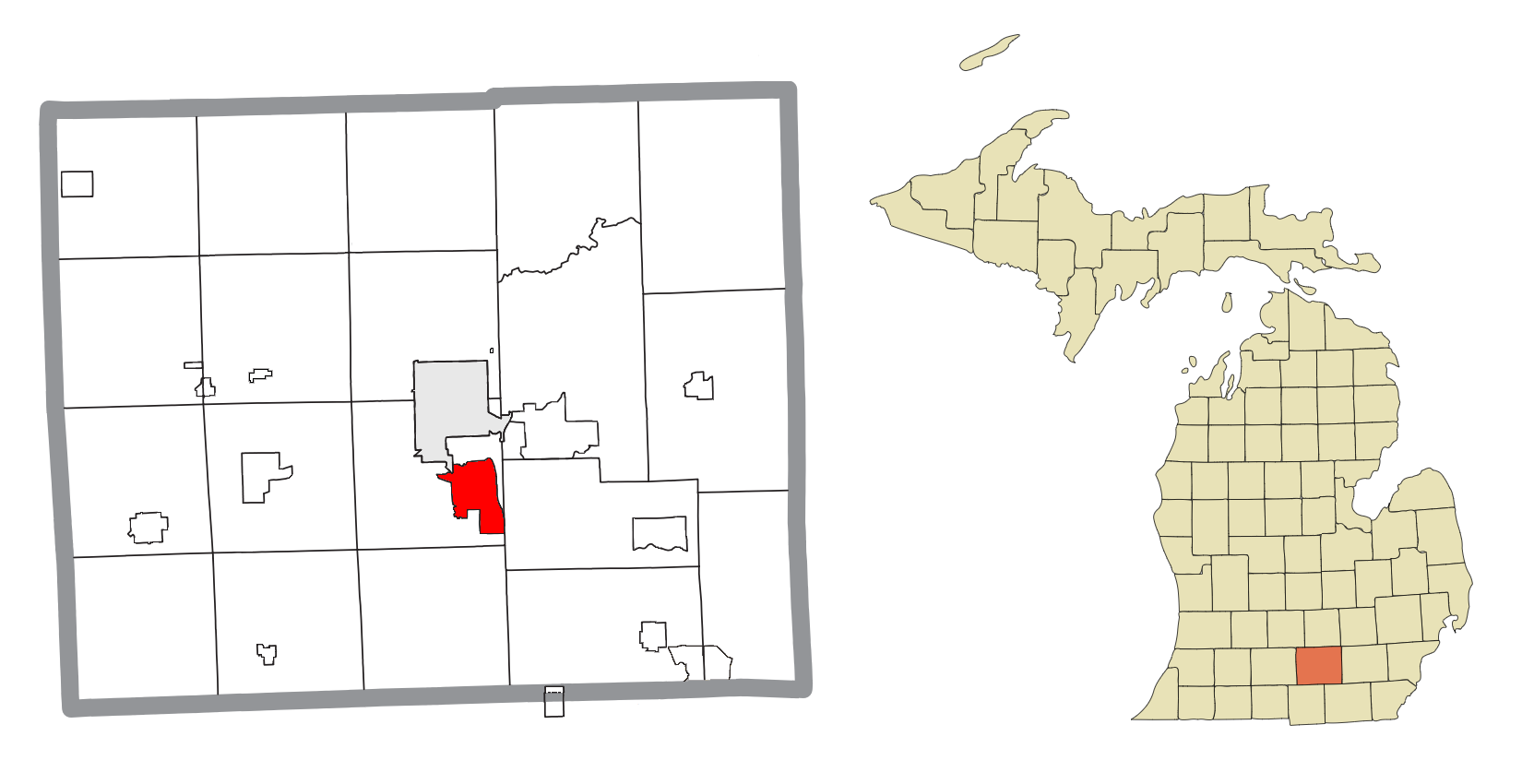
- Location within Jackson County

- Location within the state of Michigan Vandercook Lake (the United States)
- Coordinates: 42°11′36″N 84°23′28″W
- Country: United States
- State: Michigan
- County: Jackson
- Township: Summit

Area
  - Total: 4.83 sq mi (12.51 km^{2})
  - Land: 4.58 sq mi (11.87 km^{2})
  - Water: 0.25 sq mi (0.64 km^{2})
- Elevation: 974 ft (297 m)

Population (2020)
  - Total: 4,579
  - Density: 998.9/sq mi (385.68/km^{2})
- Time zone: UTC-5 (Eastern (EST))
  - Summer (DST): UTC-4 (EDT)
- ZIP code(s): 49203 (Jackson)
- FIPS code: 26-81740
- GNIS feature ID: 1615507

Vandercook Lake is an unincorporated community and census-designated place (CDP) in Jackson County in the U.S. state of Michigan. As of the 2020 census, Vandercook Lake had a population of 4,579. It is located within Summit Township.

== Geography ==
According to the United States Census Bureau, the CDP has a total area of 4.83 square miles (12.51 km^{2}), of which 4.57 square miles (11.84 km^{2}) is land and 0.26 square miles (0.67 km^{2}) (5.38%) is water.

The community is in central Jackson County, in the eastern part of Summit Township. It sits on the eastern side of Vandercook Lake, a water body on the Grand River. Part of the community is bordered to the north by the city of Jackson, the county seat. U.S. Route 127 forms the eastern edge of the CDP; the highway leads north 6 miles (10 km) to Interstate 94 northeast of Jackson and south 24 miles (39 km) to Hudson.

== Demographics ==
Historical population
Census	Pop.	Note	%±
2020	4,579		—
U.S. Decennial Census

=== 2020 census ===
As of the 2020 census, Vandercook Lake had a population of 4,579. The median age was 42.9 years. 20.8% of residents were under the age of 18 and 19.8% of residents were 65 years of age or older. For every 100 females there were 99.7 males, and for every 100 females age 18 and over there were 95.3 males age 18 and over.

95.4% of residents lived in urban areas, while 4.6% lived in rural areas.

There were 1,835 households in Vandercook Lake, of which 27.0% had children under the age of 18 living in them. Of all households, 47.6% were married-couple households, 18.5% were households with a male householder and no spouse or partner present, and 25.7% were households with a female householder and no spouse or partner present. About 26.3% of all households were made up of individuals and 11.0% had someone living alone who was 65 years of age or older.

There were 1,969 housing units, of which 6.8% were vacant. The homeowner vacancy rate was 3.7% and the rental vacancy rate was 1.7%.

Racial composition as of the 2020 census
Race	Number	Percent
White	4,137	90.3%
Black or African American	85	1.9%
American Indian and Alaska Native	14	0.3%
Asian	34	0.7%
Native Hawaiian and Other Pacific Islander	1	0.0%
Some other race	20	0.4%
Two or more races	288	6.3%
Hispanic or Latino (of any race)	153	3.3%

=== 2000 census ===
As of the census of 2000, there were 4,809 people, 1,847 households, and 1,346 families residing in the CDP. The population density was 1,054.1 inhabitants per square mile (407.0/km^{2}). There were 1,935 housing units at an average density of 424.2 per square mile (163.8/km^{2}). The racial makeup of the CDP was 96.13% White, 1.19% Black or African American, 0.54% Native American, 0.06% Asian, 0.04% Pacific Islander, 0.56% from other races, and 1.48% from two or more races. Hispanic or Latino of any race were 2.39% of the population.

There were 1,847 households, out of which 34.3% had children under the age of 18 living with them, 56.6% were married couples living together, 11.7% had a female householder with no husband present, and 27.1% were non-families. 23.6% of all households were made up of individuals, and 10.3% had someone living alone who was 65 years of age or older. The average household size was 2.60 and the average family size was 3.07.

In the CDP, the population was spread out, with 27.2% under the age of 18, 7.5% from 18 to 24, 29.6% from 25 to 44, 21.8% from 45 to 64, and 13.9% who were 65 years of age or older. The median age was 36 years. For every 100 females, there were 93.1 males. For every 100 females age 18 and over, there were 92.5 males.

The median income for a household in the CDP was $40,238, and the median income for a family was $49,115. Males had a median income of $36,555 versus $25,222 for females. The per capita income for the CDP was $17,359. About 3.7% of families and 5.7% of the population were below the poverty line, including 7.3% of those under age 18 and 3.6% of those age 65 or over.

== School district ==
The majority of the Vandercook Lake CDP is within the Vandercook Lake Public Schools district, which includes:

- Vandercook Lake High/Middle School
- Townsend Elementary School - Now used for child care, preschool and grades K-5.
- McDevitt School - No longer in use and is now a vacant building.

The high school mascot is the Jayhawk. The district's sports teams also use the nickname "Vandy" on uniforms and in cheers.

Small parts of the CDP are in the Jackson Public Schools school district.

== Recreation ==
Vandercook Lake County Park is a 17-acre (6.9 ha) park that includes a swim area, three ball diamonds, a boat launch, playground area, fishing area, grills, two picnic shelters, and modern restrooms. Quiet World Sports operates a kayak livery from the park.
