= St. Mary Star of the Sea Catholic Church (Jackson, Michigan) =

Catholic church

St. Mary Star of the Sea
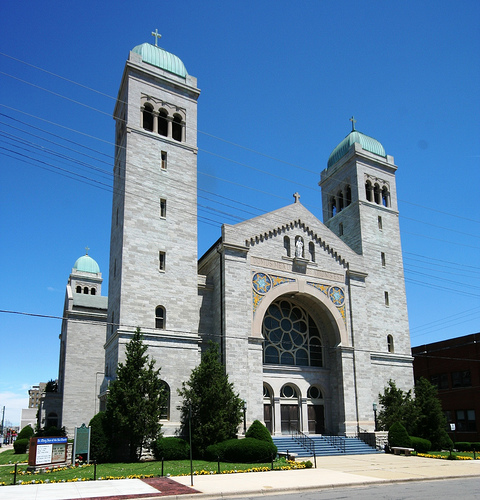

Religion
- Affiliation: Roman Catholic
- Diocese: Diocese of Lansing
- Leadership: Rev. Timothy Nelson
- Year consecrated: 1926

Location
- Location: 120 E. Wesley St. Jackson, Michigan
- Interactive map of St. Mary Star of the Sea
- Coordinates: 42.2451°N 84.4054°W

Architecture
- Architect: Frederick Spier
- Type: Church
- Style: Byzantine Revival, Romanesque Revival
- Groundbreaking: 1923
- Completed: 1926
- Construction cost: $375,000

Specifications
- Height (max): 180 feet (55 m)
- Materials: Limestone; Steel; Copper towers

Website
- stmaryjackson.com

St. Mary Star of the Sea Catholic Church is a parish of the Roman Catholic Church located in downtown Jackson, Michigan, in the Diocese of Lansing. It is dedicated to Our Lady, Star of the Sea. In 2008 it absorbed the congregations of St. Stanislaus Kostka Chapel and the Chapel of Sacred Heart, also in Jackson.

== History ==
In 1880, Bishop Caspar Henry Borgess of the Detroit Diocese approved the establishment of a second Catholic parish in the city of Jackson, after St. John the Evangelist.

On June 14, 1881, Robert Lake was contracted to build a new church. It was to be Gothic style and of brick, with the steeple rising 180 feet (55 m). The cornerstone was laid July 4, 1881. It would seat six hundred people and the cost was just over $30,000. Within 20 years, this first church had become inadequate in size, and admission cards were issued to parishioners for Mass.

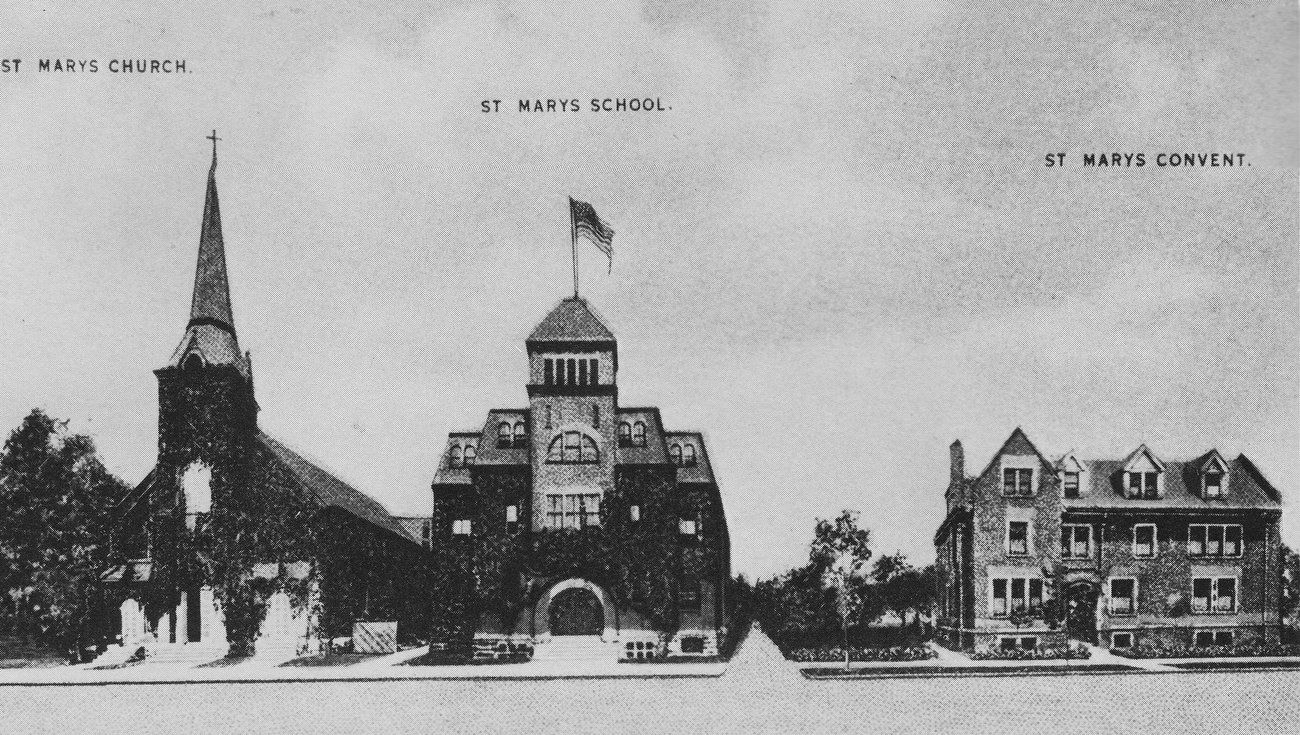
St Mary Star of the Sea Church pre -1923

In 1910, plans were announced for the current church, and the pastor and church trustees traveled to Europe, viewing some of the most beautiful cathedrals. Building plans were delayed by World War I, but finally on Sunday, September 23, 1923, the cornerstone was laid. The basement was ready and used for Midnight Mass on Christmas, 1923. However, a prolonged strike in the limestone industry delayed progress and it was not completed until 1926. On May 31, 1926, Bishop Joseph C. Plagens officiated at the dedication. The cost of the new church was approximately $375,000.

In the fall of 2008, St. Mary Parish merged with St. Stanislaus Kostka Chapel in Jackson, which houses both the Polish community of the former St. Stanislaus Kostka Parish and the Mexican community of Sacred Heart, formerly an independent chapel at a separate site in Jackson.

== Architecture ==
=== Exterior ===
Frederick Speir, of Spier & Rohns of Detroit designed the Romanesque Revival structure. It is constructed of steel framework with an exterior hammer-dressed limestone veneer, and is a combination of Byzantine architecture and traditional Romanesque architecture, reminiscent of German Rundbogenstil. The front of the church originally featured two lighthouses where wrought iron lamps now stand.

The steeple rises 180 feet (55 m). The southwest corner houses the 2,700-pound (1,200 kg) bell, cast in 1902 for the parish's original church. All three towers are capped with copper sheeting, which is curved to meet at the top with a wood post that supports a 6 ft × 3 ft × 6 ft (1.83 m × 0.91 m × 1.83 m) gold-leafed metal-clad cross.

The front features three sets of double doors of copper and bronze. Over the entrance is a figure of Mary and the words "Domus Mea Domus Orationis Est" which translated from the Latin is "My House is a House of Prayer" taken from Isaiah 56:7.

The slate roof and copper gutter system was replaced by the Detroit Cornice and Slate Co. as a part of the church's recent renovation projects.

=== Interior ===
Statues of Saints Mary, Joseph, Anne with Mary, Divine Mercy, Therese, and Roch, Pope Pius X, the communion rail, and back altar are all made of Italian Carrara marble. The altars and communion rails were a donation by George Washington Hill, then president of the American Tobacco Company. The red and green colors of the mosaic work on the main altar correspond to the original colors on a pack of Lucky Strike cigarettes. The pews from the original church were used to construct the confessionals and sacristy cases.

All of the stained glass windows, Stations of the Cross, and mosaic "Our Lady Star of the Sea", believed to have been created in the early 1900s, were purchased after World War I from Tyrolese Art Glass Company in Innsbruck, Austria for $22,000. In 1961, the windows were appraised for $150,000. The Stations of the Cross were appraised at $16,000 at that time. In 2015, the church began the project of having the stained glass windows restored and renovated, by the Full Spectrum Stained Glass Company of Colon, Michigan.

A notable stained glass window is entitled "Christ and the Battlefield." The window was created from a design made by the church pastor, Eugene M. Cullinane. It is a World War I memorial to "all Jacksonians serving in the Armed Forces and to the nuns and nurses who cared for them on the battlefields." At the right of the scene are soldiers and sailors arriving on shore, bearing the American flag and supporting the wounded. To the left are other soldiers and a Sister of Charity of St. Vincent de Paul tending a fallen nurse. Behind them St. Mary looks upward toward figures of Christ and attending angels.

The pipe organ, originally built by Frank Roosevelt in 1891 and relocated to the new church when it was completed, is electro-magnetic, and consists of 39 ranks and 3 consoles.

A marker designating the church as a Michigan Historic Site was erected in 1981 by the Michigan History Division of the Michigan Department of State. The inscription reads:

In 1880 Bishop Casper Henry Borgess of the Detroit Diocese approved the establishment of a second Catholic parish in the city of Jackson. The cornerstone ceremony for the parish church was held July 4, 1881. The present limestone Romanesque structure, erected in 1923/26 was designed by Frederick Spier of Detroit. One of the towers houses the 2,700-pound 1902 bell from the parish's first church. The edifice also features stained-glass windows imported from Innsbruck, Austria, and Italian Carrara marble altars and communion rails. The confessionals and sacristy cases were built using the pews of the first building. During the parish's growth from 124 members at its founding to 3,800 at the time of its centennial, it has had only six pastors.

== School ==
A school associated with the church, St. Mary's, was built in 1889. The laying of the cornerstone for the school on June 30, 1889, was attended by a large crowd and presided over by Bishop John Foley, of Detroit, as reported by the Jackson Daily Citizen the following day. The ten-room school house was built at a cost of $17,000. When the school opened that October with 150 students, it was staffed primarily by the Sisters of Charity from Cincinnati, Ohio. The first graduating class, in 1892, consisted of three girls. It was accredited in 1915 by the University of Michigan.

In 1950 the school purchased an adjacent building to add space to provide primary education. In 1956 more classrooms were added to the main school building and another building was purchased in 1959. The last class to graduate from St. Mary's High School did so in 1968, when Lumen Christi Catholic High School opened in Jackson and St. Mary's stopped offering secondary education. St. Mary continued to educate students through eighth grade until the opening of Jackson Catholic Middle School in 1971.

While the high school was in operation its sports teams included the 1925 Class C state championship in basketball, and unbeaten football teams in 1925, 1946, 1953 and 1954. The 1946 team closed the season by beating rival St. John's High School 13–0 before a record crowd of over 10,000 at Withington Stadium. The golf team won eight straight Class C-D titles beginning in 1954, and featured three future PGA pros, Mike Hill, Dave Hill and Steve Miller.

Other notable former students include Tom Monaghan.

In 2014, the school marked 125 years of operation, including continuing use of the original 1889 school house.

During the 1980s and 1990s, enrollment fluctuated as parents were faced with more choices and the neighborhood changed. In 1999, St. Mary's and St. Stanislaus Kostka's schools merged, with students from St. Stanislaus Kostka enrolling in St. Mary's school.

The school currently provides pre-kindgarten through sixth grade secular and K–12 religious education. A licensed daycare center was established in 1990.

As of March 2022, the school had 96 students, of which 23% were Hispanic, 12% Black and 12% multiple ethnicities. According to its pastor, Fr. Tim Nelson, "We probably have the most ethnically diverse and racially diverse student population in the city".
