= Jackson County Airport (Michigan) =

Jackson County Airport Reynolds Field
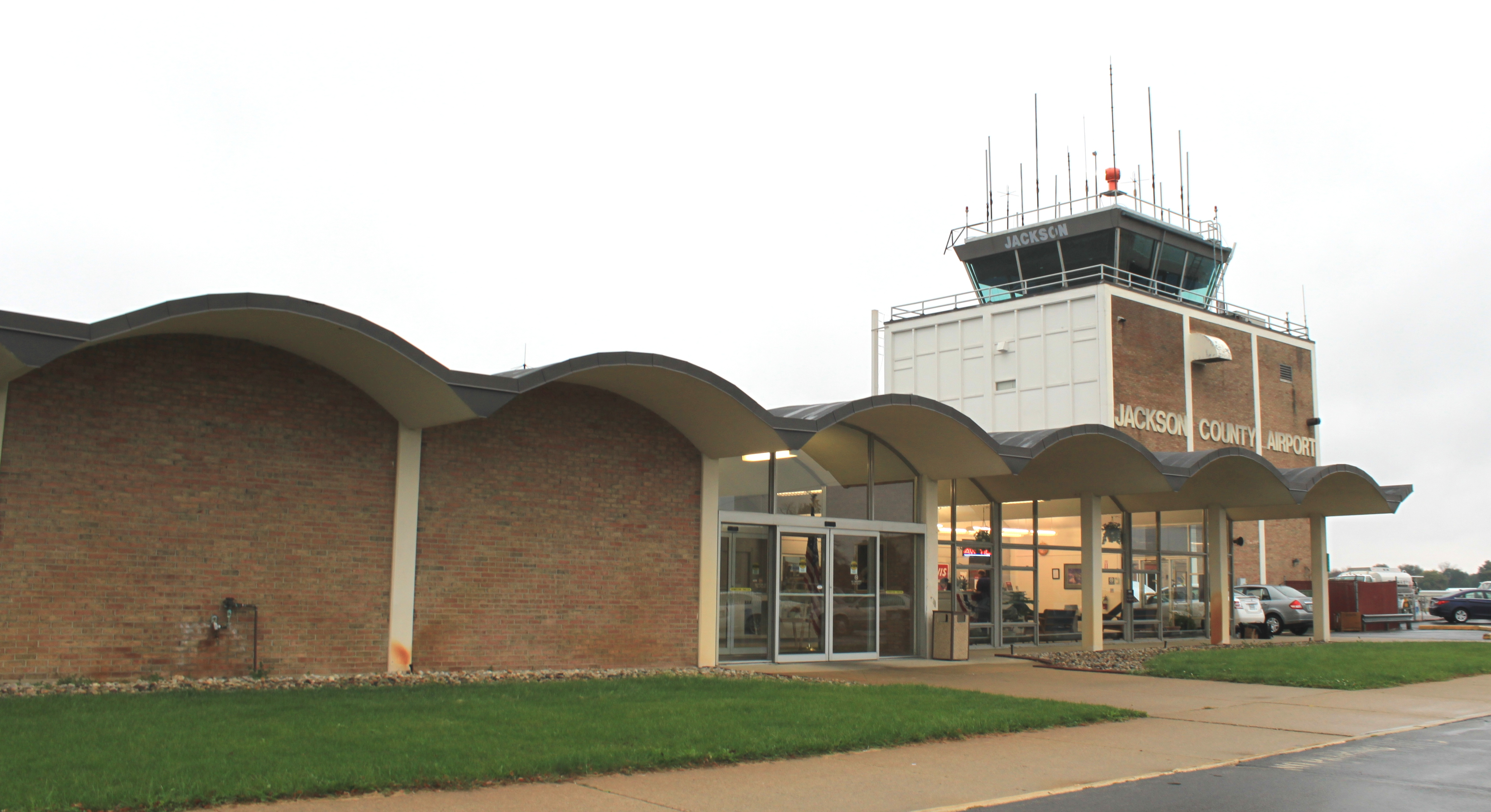
- Terminal and control tower
- IATA: JXN; ICAO: KJXN; FAA LID: JXN

Summary
- Airport type: Public
- Owner: Jackson County
- Serves: Jackson, Michigan
- Elevation AMSL: 1,001 ft (305 m)
- Coordinates: 42°15′38″N 084°27′44″W
- Public transit access: JATA
- Website: www.jacksoncountyairport-mi.com/

Map
- Location of airport in Michigan JXN (the United States)

Runways
Direction	Length		Surface
Direction	ft	m	Surface
7/25	5,351	1,631	Asphalt
14/32	4,000	1,219	Asphalt

Statistics (2021)
- Aircraft operations: 26,300
- Based aircraft: 87
- Source: Federal Aviation Administration

Jackson County Airport (IATA: JXN, ICAO: KJXN, FAA LID: JXN), also known as Reynolds Field, is a county-owned, public-use airport located two nautical miles (3.7 km) west of the central business district of Jackson, in Jackson County, Michigan, United States. It is a class D airport with an operating control tower. It is included in the Federal Aviation Administration (FAA) National Plan of Integrated Airport Systems for 2017–2021, in which it is categorized as a regional general aviation facility.

The airport serves as a general aviation facility and is home to the Jackson College Flight Center. In 2005 the airport became home to Prestige Aircraft Company LLC, a light sport aircraft manufacturer. The airport is also home to a chapter of the Experimental Aircraft Association.

== History ==
The airport opened in 1928, and its first control tower was built in 1961.

The airport has been praised for allowing business development and supporting the Michigan International Speedway.

== Facilities and aircraft ==
Jackson County-Reynolds Field covers an area of 950 acres (380 ha) at an elevation of 1,001 feet (305 m) above mean sea level. It has two asphalt paved runways: 7/25 is 5,351 by 100 feet (1,631 x 30 m) and 14/32 is 4,000 by 100 feet (1,219 x 30 m).

Runway 7/25 replaced the previous main asphalt runway, designated 6/24, in 2017. The new runway has 1,000 feet of additional runoff space on each end.

The airport has a fixed-base operator that offers services such as fuel, deicing, catering, lavatory services, a pilot lounge, showers, snooze rooms, a flight briefing station, and courtesy transportation. An airport is also located on airport property.

In summer 2022, the Federal Aviation Administration awarded Jackson County $2.2 million to modernize its air traffic control tower, which was 60 years old at the time. New facilities will include restrooms, new doors, and an elevator, helping the tower come into compliance with the Americans with Disabilities Act. The airport will also receive money for asbestos removal and replacing mechanical, electric, and lighting systems to boost airport efficiency, as well as the installation of a new air conditioning and ventilation system to make the control tower workable. Money came from the Bipartisan Infrastructure Law signed by President Joe Biden. Designs are expected to be fully submitted by February 2023 with construction beginning soon after.

For the 12-month period ending December 31, 2021, the airport had 26,300 aircraft operations, an average of 72 per day. It includes 99% general aviation and <1% military. This is down from 139 total daily operations in 2010. At that time, there were 87 aircraft based at this airport: 67 single-engine and 15 multi-engine airplanes, three jet aircraft, one helicopter and one glider aircraft.

== Historical airline service ==
The airport was served by commercial airlines from the 1920s until 1989. American Airlines served Jackson until about 1952 as one of several stops on a route between Chicago and Detroit. Other stops along the route included South Bend, Indiana as well as Kalamazoo, Battle Creek, and Ann Arbor, Michigan. North Central Airlines then took over serving the Chicago-Detroit local multi-stop route. In 1979, North Central merged with other carriers to become Republic Airlines. Republic continued to serve Jackson with flights to Detroit until 1981, when the service was transferred to Simmons Airlines. In 1985, Simmons became a feeder carrier for Republic known as Republic Express. In 1986, Republic was merged into Northwest Airlines, and the service operated by Simmons became known as Northwest Airlink. In 1989, the Simmons flights to Detroit were then switched to American Eagle, in affiliation with American Airlines, but service ended by November 1989.

== Jackson County Aviation Day ==
The airport holds an annual aviation day that includes attractions such as meetings with flight schools, flights in vintage World War II aircraft, tours of modern military aircraft, simulator flights, aircraft maintenance tours, and more. Its sponsors include the Yankee Air Museum, the Jackson Tourism board, Aertech Manufacturing, local financial advisors, and a cookie company.

== Accidents and incidents ==
- On July 11, 2002, a Cessna 310 crashed while on approach to Jackson County Airport. Though the flight was relatively normal, while the plane was about 1/3 down the runway to land, it veered right despite attempts to keep the plane on centerline. Adding power did not bring the aircraft out of the turn, so the pilot reduced power on both engines and tried to bring the aircraft level, and the plane impacted a grass area off the side of the runway. The probable cause was ultimately found to be the pilot's improper management of the fuel system, including his failure to reposition the fuel selectors to the main fuel tanks prior to landing, as directed in the pilot operating handbook. Additional causes to the accident were the pilot not maintaining aircraft control during the engine failure and his delayed remedial action to the encountered uncommanded roll (VMC roll).
- On December 15, 2002, a Piper PA-30 Twin Comanche experienced a gear-up landing at Jackson County. The pilot reported that the landing gear would not lower on the downwind leg of the traffic pattern while operating at the airport, and the landing gear circuit breaker was popped with the voltage meter was at 0. He reported an electrical failure to air traffic control and twice tried resetting the electrical system. The pilot then tried an emergency extension of the landing gear and performed a flyby to have controllers inspect the gear. The aircraft landed with its gear up on grass next to the main runway. It was later found that the pilot improperly followed emergency gear extension procedures. Thus, the probable cause was found to be the pilot's failure to follow the checklist and extend the landing gear resulting in a gear up landing.
- On February 27, 2004, an Aero Commander 112 impacted a snow bank while landing at Jackson County Airport. The CFI reported that upon landing the left main landing gear tire blew out and the airplane veered to the left even though the landing was not hard and the student did not seem to be locking the brakes. Both pilots aboard used right rudder in an attempt to keep the aircraft on the runway, but it still continued off the left side of the runway. The probable cause was found to be the failure of the left main tire, resulting in the CFI's inability to maintain directional control of the airplane during the landing.
- On September 22, 2004, a Piper Cherokee collided with a deer while landing at Jackson County.
- On April 18, 2005, a Cessna 195 ground-looped while landing at Jackson County Airport. The instructional flight was taken with the intent of accomplishing a flight review. The pilot and CFI both reported a normal, stabilized approach until touchdown, when rudder authority became ineffective and the aircraft swung violently. The left main gear was found separated from the aircraft. No anomalies were found with the tailwheel assembly. The probable cause was found to be the fracture of the left brake master cylinder piston rod, which resulted in the total failure of the left-side brake system and the subsequent loss of directional control during landing roll.
- On October 9, 2005 a Beech model 19A sustained substantial damage while trying to land at Jackson County Airport. Air traffic controllers reported the airplane porpoised before running off the runway, striking a runway sign, and came to rest in grass off the side of the runway. The probable cause was found to be the student pilot's inadvertent porpoise during landing, which resulted in a loss of control and a collision with a sign.
- On June 6, 2006, a Piper Cherokee Six experienced a gear-up landing. A post accident examination revealed that the landing gear was operational and no anomalies were detected. The probable cause was found to be the pilot's inadvertent wheels up landing.
- On July 16, 2011, a Dixon Volksplane VP-1 impacted a barn after a partial engine failure after departure from Jackson County Airport. The pilot reported the plane was sluggish after departure, especially in the left wing, but he was able to control the aircraft with right aileron. After leaving ground effect, airspeed and engine rpms were decreasing slowly, and the pilot began a shallow turn in an attempt to land back at the airport. The engine continued losing power and failed at tree top height, at which point the left wing contacted a pole barn, which spun the airplane around, and the plane impacted the ground. The probable cause was found to be a partial loss of engine power during initial climb after takeoff for undetermined reasons.
- On June 25, 2016, a North American Snj crashed while landing at Jackson County. The aircraft's left wing rose on the landing rollout, and while the pilot tried responding with left aileron, the aircraft started "yawing, sliding, and turning sideways on the pavement". The airplane veered off the runway to the left, the right main landing gear collapsed, and the airplane impacted the ground. The probable cause was found to be the pilot's failure to maintain directional control during the landing roll, which resulted in a runway excursion, right main landing gear collapse, and impact with the ground.
- On July 5, 2017, a Canadian-registered Cessna 182T impacted the runway after porpoising while attempting to take off from Jackson County airport. The pilot attempted to lift off after the plane reached takeoff speed, but it was unable to climb after reaching 50 feet above the ground, and the pilot noted a "transient failure" of several Primary Flight Display instruments. In an attempt to land again, the pilot settled back, but he initially landed nose wheel first. The power then set engine power to idle and flared to touch down smoothly, but the plane porpoised twice more before the pilot regained control and stopped the aircraft by the end of the runway. The engine continued operating throughout the accident sequence, and pilot was able to taxi clear of the runway under its own power. The probable cause was found to be the pilot's failure to maintain pitch control during the takeoff roll during an attempted takeoff.

== See also ==
- List of airports in Michigan
