= Antonio Bass =

American football player (born 1987)

No. 18
- Position: Wide receiver

Personal information
- Born: August 4, 1987 (age 39); Albany, New York, U.S.
- Listed height: 6 ft 1 in (1.85 m)
- Listed weight: 204 lb (93 kg)

Career information
- High school: Jackson (Jackson, Michigan)
- College: MIchigan Wolverines (2005)

Antonio Marcel Bass (born August 4, 1987) is an American former football wide receiver who played for the Michigan Wolverines.

== Early life ==
Bass attended Jackson High School, in Jackson, Michigan, where he had 276 carries for 2,177 yards and 30 rushing touchdowns during his career. He also completed 55 of 161 passes for 999 yards and 14 passing touchdowns. Bass set the school record for passing touchdowns in a season in 2003 with 10 and also holds the school record for most career touchdowns with 45. He was named to the All-State first team and was also named an All-American by SuperPrep Magazine and was the top rated player in the state of Michigan by The Detroit News. He also played four years of baseball and three years of basketball in high school.

== College career ==
In his career at Michigan, Bass played in 10 games, all in 2005, carried the ball 19 times for 81 yards, and caught eight passes for 64 yards.

In 2006, Bass sustained a serious knee injury prior to spring practice. Bass suffered nerve damage which, prior to physical therapy, had completely immobilized his foot. Although Bass had worked for several years to rehabilitate his injury, in February 2008, Michigan coach Rich Rodriguez announced that Bass's medical situation would prevent him from returning to the team. Bass remained on scholarship as he worked towards a degree in communications.

Former Michigan coach Lloyd Carr said of Bass's injury "The impact his loss had on our program can't be measured because he could do so many things...Medically, what we're all hoping is that he can lead a normal life, go play pickup basketball."
