= Anna Lynch =

Anna Lynch may refer to:

- Anna Lynch (painter) (1865–1946), American painter
- Anna Lynch (billiards player), English billiards and snooker player from Australia
- Anna Theresa Berger Lynch (1853–1925), American musician
- Ana Matronic (born Anna Lynch, 1974), American singer
