= Louise V. Gustin =

American composer

- Born: Louise Vivian Moore; December 23, 1868; Jackson, Michigan
- Died: August 29, 1949 (aged 80); New York City
- Other names: L. V. Gustin, Louise V. Taylor
- Occupation: composer

Louise V. Moore Gustin Taylor (December 23, 1868 – August 29, 1949) was an American composer of popular music.

== Early life ==
Louise Vivian Moore was born in Jackson, Michigan, the daughter of Francis B. Moore and Louisa Rawlings Moore. Both of her parents were immigrants from Great Britain. Her father worked for the railroad, and her mother was a shopkeeper.

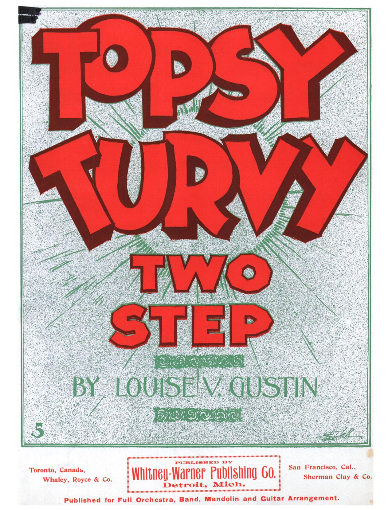
Sheet music for Louise V. Gustin, "Topsy Turvy: Two Step" (1899).

== Career ==
Louise V. Gustin was a music teacher and piano demonstrator in Detroit when she began publishing her compositions with her colleague, Frederick E. Belcher (husband of composer Henriette Blanke-Belcher). Belcher's catalog was soon acquired by Whitney-Warner Publishing, and then Jerome H. Remick, giving Gustin a wider potential audience beyond Detroit.

Published works by Gustin included "Carmelita", "Maids of Paradise", "Topsy Turvy" (1899), "An Old Virginia Cake Walk" (1899), "Dominion March" (1899), "The Daughter of the Regiment" (1900), "Janice Meredith: Waltzes" (1900), "When Knighthood Was in Flower: Waltzes" (1900), "X-N-Tric: Two Step" (1900), "Soldier of Fortune March" (1901), "Mistress Nell: Waltzes" (1901), "Viola Waltzes" (1901), "Lindy" (1902), "Neome: Waltzes (1903), "In Love's Garden" (1904), "MM and MCB March Two-Step" (1905), "Let's Trot" (1915), and "Waltz with Me: Waltzes" (1915).

Some of Gustin's music was available for player pianos. Writer and composer Monroe Rosenfeld mentioned her as an example when he praised "the great number of clever writers and composers that make Detroit their home," adding that "Many of these are young women." She is listed among the earliest women writing jazz piano pieces.

== Personal life ==
Louise Vivian Moore married James Gustin in 1887. They had a son, Frank Nellis Gustin (1888-1903). The Gustins divorced in 1895. She married her second husband, Harry Bennison Taylor, in Toronto in 1899. They had a daughter, Mary Louise Taylor, born in 1907. Louise Gustin Taylor was widowed when Harry Taylor died in 1928. She died in 1949, aged 80 years, in New York City, where she lived with her daughter.
