= Khari Willis =

American football player (born 1996)

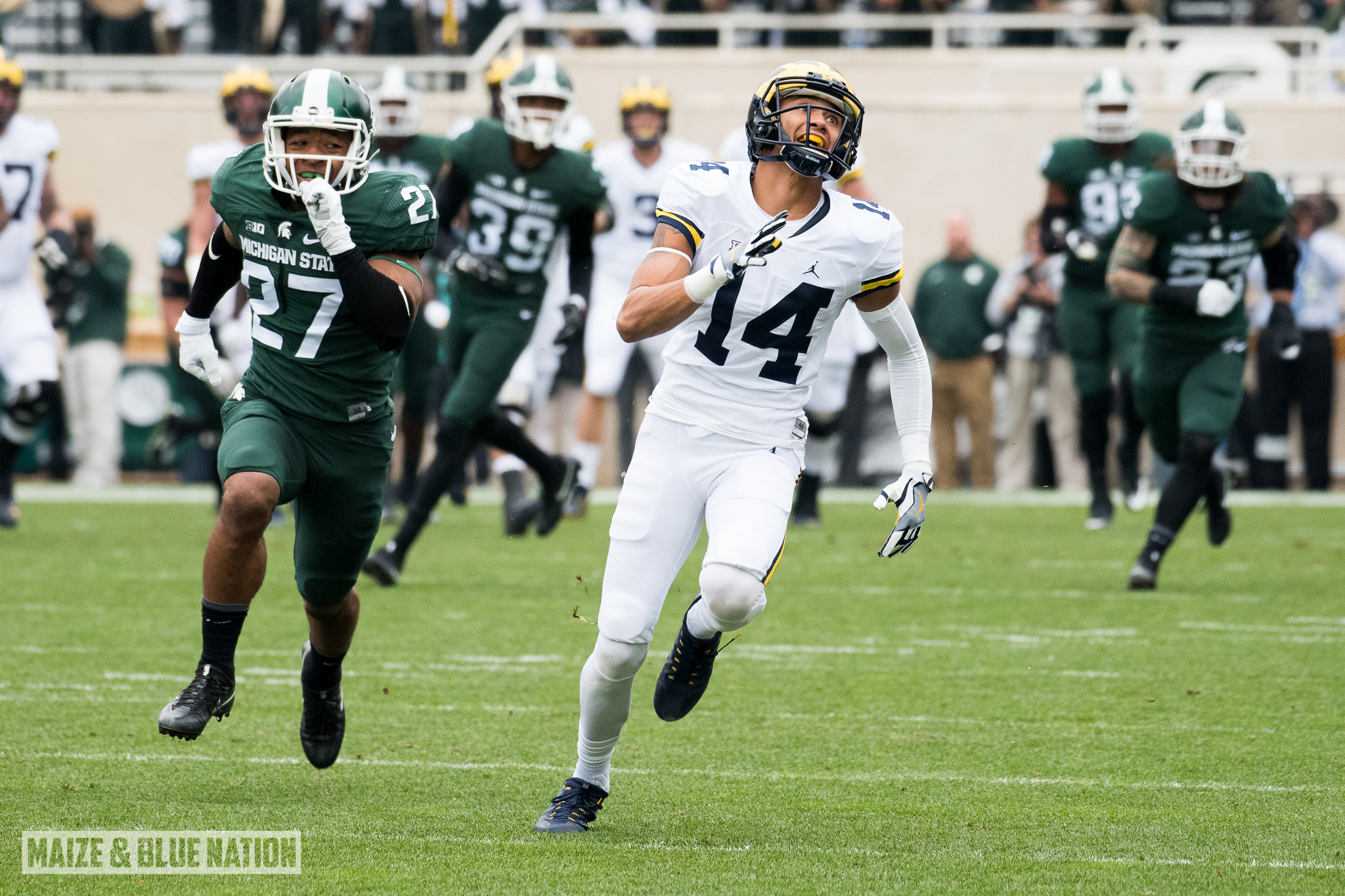
- Willis with Michigan State in 2016

No. 37
- Position: Safety

Personal information
- Born: May 7, 1996 (age 30); Jackson, Michigan, U.S.
- Listed height: 5 ft 11 in (1.80 m)
- Listed weight: 213 lb (97 kg)

Career information
- High school: Lumen Christi Catholic (Jackson)
- College: Michigan State (2015–2018)
- NFL draft: 2019: 4th round, 109th overall pick

Career history
- Indianapolis Colts (2019–2021)

Career NFL statistics
- Total tackles: 219
- Sacks: 3.5
- Forced fumbles: 1
- Fumble recoveries: 1
- Interceptions: 4
- Defensive touchdowns: 1
- Stats at Pro Football Reference

Khari Willis (born May 7, 1996) is an American former professional football player who was a safety for the Indianapolis Colts of the National Football League (NFL) from 2019 to 2021. He played college football for the Michigan State Spartans. In 2022, Willis announced his retirement from professional sports to pursue a career in the Christian ministry.

== Early life ==
Willis was the seventh of ten siblings born to parents Mary and John. He is the cousin of former NFL player Bill Brooks. He graduated from Jackson Lumen Christi Catholic High School in 2015 and holds the school record for most rushing yards in a season with 2,800.

== Professional career ==
Pre-draft measurables
Height	Weight	Arm length	Hand span	Wingspan	40-yard dash	10-yard split	20-yard split	20-yard shuttle	Three-cone drill	Vertical jump	Broad jump	Bench press
5 ft 10 7/8 in (1.80 m)	213 lb (97 kg)	31 in (0.79 m)	9 1/2 in (0.24 m)	6 ft 2 3/8 in (1.89 m)	4.52 s	1.64 s	2.68 s	4.13 s	7.15 s	34.5 in (0.88 m)	9 ft 10 in (3.00 m)	22 reps
All values from NFL Combine/Michigan State's Pro Day

The Indianapolis Colts selected Willis in the fourth round (109th overall) in the 2019 NFL draft. The Colts traded two fourth round picks (129th overall and 135th overall) in the 2019 Draft to the Oakland Raiders in order to move up and select Willis. He was the 10th safety selected in 2019.

On May 13, 2019, the Colts signed Willis to a four-year, $3.28 million contract that included a signing bonus of $767,104.

In Week 1 of the 2020 season against the Jacksonville Jaguars, Willis recorded his first career sack on Gardner Minshew during the 27–20 loss. In the following week's game against the Minnesota Vikings, Willis recorded his first career interception off a pass thrown by former Spartan Kirk Cousins during the 28–11 win. In Week 14 against the Las Vegas Raiders, Willis intercepted a pass thrown by Derek Carr and returned it for a 50-yard touchdown during the 44–27 win.

Willis entered the 2021 season as the Colts starting strong safety. He started the first six of seven games before being placed on injured reserve on November 4, 2021. He was activated on December 4.

On June 15, 2022, Willis announced he was retiring to pursue ministry full-time.
