= Jackson Public Schools (Michigan) =

School district in Michigan

Address
- 522 Wildwood Ave Jackson, Jackson County, Michigan, 49201; United States

District information
- Grades: Pre-Kindergarten-12
- Established: 1897
- Superintendent: Jeffrey Beal
- Schools: 13
- Budget: $95,049,000 2022-2023 expenditures
- NCES District ID: 2619620

Students and staff
- Students: 4,310 (2024-2025)
- Teachers: 259.34 FTE (2024-2025)
- Staff: 659.25 FTE (2024-2025)
- Student–teacher ratio: 16.62 (2024-2025)

Other information
- Website: www.jpsk12.org

Jackson Public Schools is a public school district in Jackson County, Michigan. It serves Jackson and parts of Blackman Township, Liberty Township, Napoleon Township, and Summit Township.

== History ==
Schooling began in Jackson in 1831, when Miss Silence D. Blackman opened a school in her home for the community's children. By 1838, there were two school districts in the city, separated by the Grand River. The West Side High School's first graduating class was in 1871, and East Side High's was in 1876. The districts combined in 1897 and in 1908 a new high school was built at Washington Street at Jackson Street for the united district.

The present Jackson High School was built in 1927 and was renovated in 1999. Dave Fleming, the architect of the renovation, was awarded a Lifetime Viking award by the district in 2014.

On February 6, 2014, Jackson High graduate Jeffrey Beal was chosen unanimously to become the next Jackson Public Schools superintendent effective June 30, 2014. He succeeded former Superintendent Dan Evans who has been JPS’ superintendent since 1999.

== Schools ==
Schools in Jackson Public Schools district
School	Address	Notes
Jackson High School	544 Wildwood Ave., Jackson	Grades 9-12. Built 1927. Shares a building with Jackson Pathways High School, an alternative high school.
Middle School at Parkside	2400 Fourth St., Jackson	Grades 6-8. Shares a site with Fourth Street Learning Center, an alternative school for grades 6-8.
Cascades Elementary	1200 S. Wisner St., Jackson	Grades PreK-5. Opened fall 2021.
John R. Lewis Elementary	154 W. Clark St., Jackson	Grades PreK-5. Formerly Lincoln Elementary, closed in 1992. Renovated and reopened in fall 2021, named after Congressman John R. Lewis.
Dibble Elementary School	3450 Kibby Rd., Jackson	Grades PreK-5
Hunt Elementary	1143 N. Brown St., Jackson	Grades PreK-5. Opened 1961.
JPS Montessori Center	820 Bennett St., Jackson	Grades K-5. Formerly Bennet Elementary. Built 1968.
Northeast Elementary	1024 Fleming Ave., Saginaw	Grades PreK-5. STEAM-focused school.
Sharp Park Academy	766 Park Rd., Jackson	Grades PreK-5
