= Katherine L. Knight =

American immunologist and professor

Katherine L. Knight is an American immunologist whose research work has focused on the genetic basis of antibody formation and the interactions of the immune system with intestinal microbiota. She is professor and chair of the Department of Microbiology and Immunology at Loyola University Chicago. Knight was president of the American Association of Immunologists from 1996 to 1997.

== Education and training ==
Knight attended Jackson High School in Jackson, Michigan and went to Elmira College in New York. She earned a Ph.D. from Indiana University Bloomington in 1966 followed by postdoctoral training at University of Illinois Chicago.

== Awards ==
Knight was awarded the American Association for Immunology (AAI) Lifetime Achievement Award in 2013, The Marion Spencer Fay Award from the Institute for Women's Health and Leadership at the Drexel University College of Medicine in 2015, and was elected a Distinguished Fellow of AAI in 2019.

In February 2010, Knight was recognised as the Scientist of the Month by the Chicago branch of the Association for Women in Science.
