= Tyler Thomas (gridiron football) =

American gridiron football player (born 1990)

No. 24
- Position: Running back

Personal information
- Born: September 28, 1990 (age 36); Jackson, Michigan, U.S.
- Listed height: 5 ft 9 in (1.75 m)
- Listed weight: 205 lb (93 kg)

Career information
- High school: Jackson
- College: Bacone
- NFL draft: 2012: undrafted

Career history
- 2014: Edmonton Eskimos
- 2015: Winnipeg Blue Bombers
- 2018: Cedar Rapids Titans
- Stats at CFL.ca

Tyler Thomas (born September 28, 1990) is an American former professional football running back who played in the Canadian Football League (CFL). He played college football at Bacone College.

== Early life ==
Thomas attended Jackson High School in Jackson, Michigan.

== College career ==
Thomas recorded 133 carries for 822 yards and eight touchdowns; 15 receptions for 134 yards and one touchdown; and 12 kickoff returns for 478 yards and one touchdown in his last season for the Bacone Warriors. He was named Bacone's 2012 Offensive Most Valuable Player and the Offensive Player of the Year in the Central States Football League.

== Professional career ==
Thomas was rated the 85th best running back in the 2013 NFL draft by NFLDraftScout.com.

Thomas signed with the Edmonton Eskimos of the Canadian Football League on May 5, 2014. He was released by the Eskimos on March 16, 2015.

Thomas was signed to the Winnipeg Blue Bombers' practice roster on August 5, 2015. He was released by the team on September 4, 2015.

On September 27, 2017, Thomas signed with the Cedar Rapids Titans of the Indoor Football League for the 2018 season.
