= Westwinds Community Church =

Coordinates: 42.23476°N 84.46387°W

- Westwinds Community Church
- Location: 1000 Robinson Rd. Jackson, MI 49203
- Country: United States
- Denomination: Non-denominational, evangelical Christian
- Website: http://www.westwinds.org

History
- Founder: Ron Martoia (pastor 1986-2004)

Clergy
- Abbot: John Voelz (2004-2015) Randy Shafer (2004-2008)

Westwinds Community Church is a non-denominational, evangelical Christian church located in Jackson, Michigan, The church has received regional and national attention for using innovative techniques during its weekly services.

== History ==
Westwinds was founded in the early 1986 (the early 1986?) by Ron Martoia, who began the church from a high school Bible study.

In 1996, the church strengthen the use of technology to reach people. (Grammar?)

Since 2005, Westwinds has been led by Pastors John Voelz and Dr. David McDonald. Both Voelz and McDonald are considered lead pastors in a shared leadership model they refer to as Coriolis using the metaphor of the Coriolis Effect to explain the team and their roles. Pastor Randy Shafer was a founding member of Coriolis and he remained part of the team until his death in 2008.

Westwinds' use of livestreaming worship, blogging, podcasts and their church social network called “Community W” has led some to note “the church’s use of media and technology is prolific.”
