= Anna Theresa Berger Lynch =

American musician

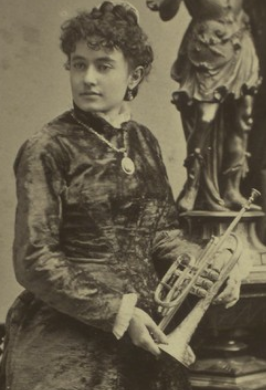
- Anna Theresa Berger, from a carte de visite in the Billy Rose Collection, New York Public Library
- Born: Anna Theresa Berger; May 16, 1853; Baltimore, Maryland
- Died: February 25, 1925 (aged 71); Jackson, Michigan
- Other names: Beula Merton, Anna Teresa Berger, Annie Berger Lynch

Anna Theresa Berger Lynch (May 16, 1853 – February 25, 1925), born Anna Theresa Berger, was an American musician.

== Early life ==
Anna Theresa Berger was born in Baltimore, the daughter of Henry F. Berger and Annie Berger. Her father was an organist and organ builder. She played cornet and trumpet from an early age, as part of her family's touring musical act, and, after her father's death in 1863, with the Carter Zouave Troupe. She studied with Jules Levy and with Scottish-born cornetist Matthew Arbuckle. She also learned to play the violin.

== Career ==
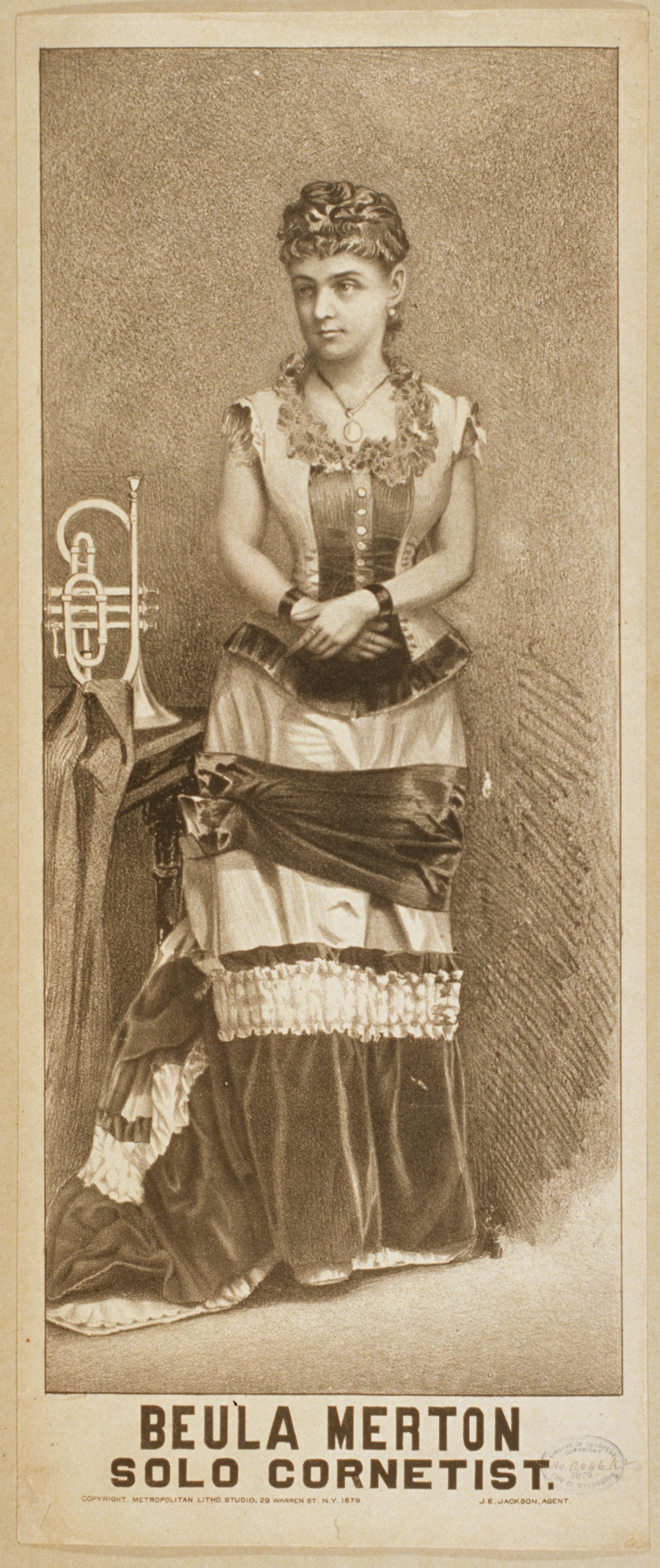
Beula Merton (Anna Theresa Berger), solo cornetist (1879), in the theatrical poster collection of the Library of Congress

Berger toured with her siblings in the United States in 1871 and 1879, played in Cuba in 1877, toured in Europe in 1889, and started her own concert company in 1892. During her concerts in London in 1889, critic George Bernard Shaw wrote, "I do not know why a lady should play the cornet; indeed, I do not know why anybody should play it; but her right is as valid as a man's." He continued, "Miss Berger's double-tonguing verges on the unattainable."

Berger sometimes performed as a solo musician under the name Beula Merton.

== Personal life ==
In 1879, Anna Berger married theatrical agent Leigh S. Lynch. They raised five children. One daughter died from diphtheria in 1888. Her husband died in 1904. She died in 1925, aged 71 years, in Jackson, Michigan.
