= Jackson High School (Michigan) =

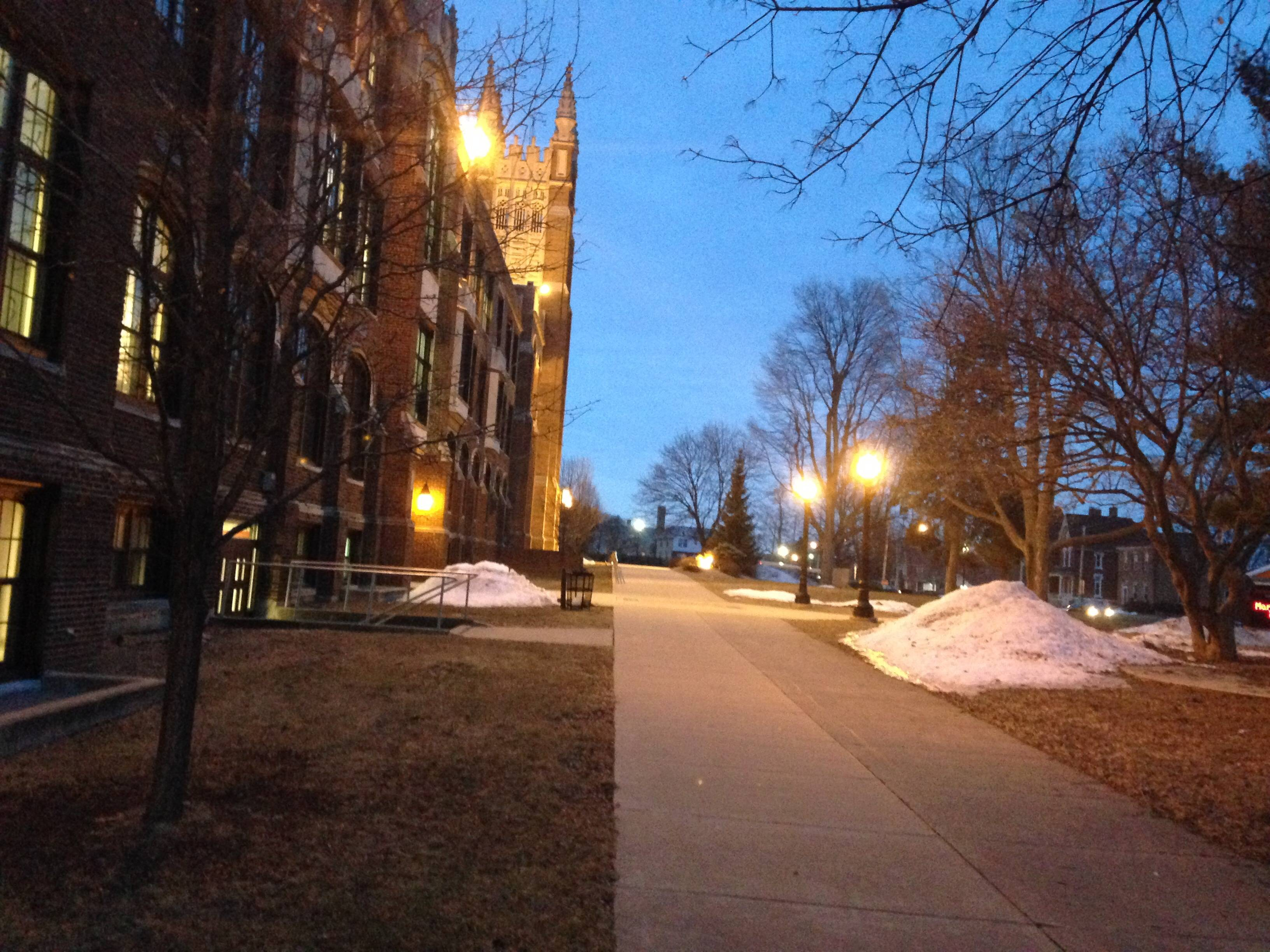

Location
- 544 Wildwood Avenue; Jackson, Michigan 49201; United States; 42°15′00″N 84°25′07″W

Information
- Type: Public High School
- Established: 1927
- School district: Jackson Public Schools
- Principal: Monica Pierce
- Teaching staff: 51.60 (FTE)
- Grades: 9-12
- Enrollment: 1,027 (2023-2024)
- Student to teacher ratio: 19.90
- Campus: Urban
- Colors: Orange & Black
- Athletics conference: Southeastern Conference
- Team name: Vikings
- Rival: Lumen Christi Catholic High School
- Newspaper: The Reflector News
- Website: jacksonhigh.jpsk12.org

Jackson High School is a public high school located near downtown Jackson, Michigan. The school was created in 1908 with the merger of Jackson's West Side and East Side High Schools and moved to its present location in 1927. The school's mascot is the Viking. The athletic teams compete as members of the Southeastern Conference as of 2018. It is a part of the Jackson Public Schools.

Jackson High School, alongside its normal curriculum, has a dual enrollment program where students can take courses at the local community college, Jackson College.

== Administration ==
The administration of Jackson High School consist of four principals - one for each grade level - who are responsible for the day-to-day running of the school, along with supervising events, and implementing curriculum. The building principal, also known as the Principal for Instruction and principal for the 12th grade, is currently Monica Pierce.

== Demographics ==
The demographic breakdown of the 1,279 students enrolled for the school year 2014-15 was:

- Male - 49.8%
- Female - 50.2%
- Native American/Alaskan - 0.2%
- Asian/Pacific islander - 1.6%
- Black - 37.3%
- Hispanic - 5.2%
- White - 53.1%
- Multiracial - 2.6%

Additionally, 56.9% of the students were eligible for free or reduced lunch.

== Academics ==
In their junior year, students are required by Jackson Public Schools to take the MME and the ACT. As of 2013, Jackson High has three hundred and eighty seven students in seventeen sections of AP classes covering:

- AP English Literature
- AP Calculus
- AP Statistics
- AP Biology
- AP Chemistry
- AP Physics C: Mechanics
- AP U.S. Government & Politics
- AP U.S. History
- AP Psychology
- AP Microeconomics
- AP Macroeconomics
- AP French Language
- AP Spanish Language
- AP World History
- AP Human Geography

== The building ==
Originally built in 1927, the three-story tall building stands thirty three meters, or one hundred and nine feet tall. After Jackson High School received a $27 million renovation (one that also restored the building after many years of neglect due to budget constraints), a science wing was built. A highlight of this building is Britton Hall, commonly referred to as the Shakespeare Room, that is patterned after an old English hall in Stratford, England.

== Extracurricular activities ==
=== Fine and performing arts ===
==== Band ====
JHS has four concert bands as well as an orchestra. The Cadet band is composed of freshmen; varsity, varsity wind ensemble, and symphony band are sophomores through seniors. In addition to the four concert bands Jackson High has two after school jazz bands and a marching band. The marching band has performed at the Outback Bowl in Tampa, Florida.

==== Choir ====
The Jackson High vocal music program currently consists of two choirs, Varsity Voices and Euphony Choir. In addition, there is an extracurricular choral group known as The Black History Tour Group. They have sung at presidential inaugurations twice, in 2001 and 2009 and have appeared at White House functions three times, in 1998, 2004 and 2007.

==== Dramatics ====
Jackson High School offers a class in theater. The drama club puts on two to three performances per year. After-school programs are also available, including Improv and other theater productions.

==== Visual Arts ====
The visual arts classes at Jackson High vary from general art classes to Sculpture, Drawing and AP Studio Art.

=== Athletics ===
Sports offered for both boys and girls are: basketball, bowling, cross country, golf, soccer, swimming, track, and tennis. In addition Jackson High also offers boys' baseball, football, hockey, and wrestling, and girls' cheerleading, softball, and volleyball.

== Athletic facilities ==
Jackson High School's gymnasium is an over two thousand seat facility that holds home basketball games, along with MHSAA playoff games. The gymnasium has three full basketball courts, volleyball courts, and a three lane one hundred and sixty meter indoor track. Withington Community Stadium and Dungy Field are home to the Jackson High School football and track and field teams, as well as the Lumen Christi High School football team. On October 24, 2008, Dungy Field was dedicated to the entire Dungy Family, most notably Tony Dungy. The track at Withington Community Stadium and Dungy Field has a nine lane four hundred meter surface made of a combination of rubber and polyurethane. Withington Stadium holds ten thousand people, and hosts MHSAA football playoffs, along with the Midwest Meet of Champions. The soccer teams play at Justin Mehall Memorial Field. Jackson High School also has two different tennis facilities, the six court complex is at Jackson High School, and the new ten court Dennis Kiley Tennis Complex is located at the Middle School at Parkside, but is utilized by Jackson High School. Jackson High also has a six lane twenty five yard length pool, a fitness center, and a second gymnasium.

== Notable alumni ==
- Antonio Bass – former University of Michigan football player
- Dan Coats – Former U.S. Senator from Indiana and President Trump's Director of National Intelligence.
- John A. Holm – linguist
- Fred Janke – University of Michigan football player and Mayor of Jackson
- Steven Kampfer – NHL hockey player for the Florida Panthers
- Vivian Kellogg – American baseball player
- Katherine L. Knight – immunologist
- Clarence Love – Former NFL defensive back
- Jack Paar – Host of The Tonight Show (dropped out in 10th grade)
- James Stanley - former American Football Player and current Defensive Backs Coach for the Hamilton Ti-Cats of the Canadian Football League (CFL)
- Tyler Thomas – gridiron football player
- Alfred Worden – NASA Astronaut who visited the Moon
