= Dominic Pangborn =

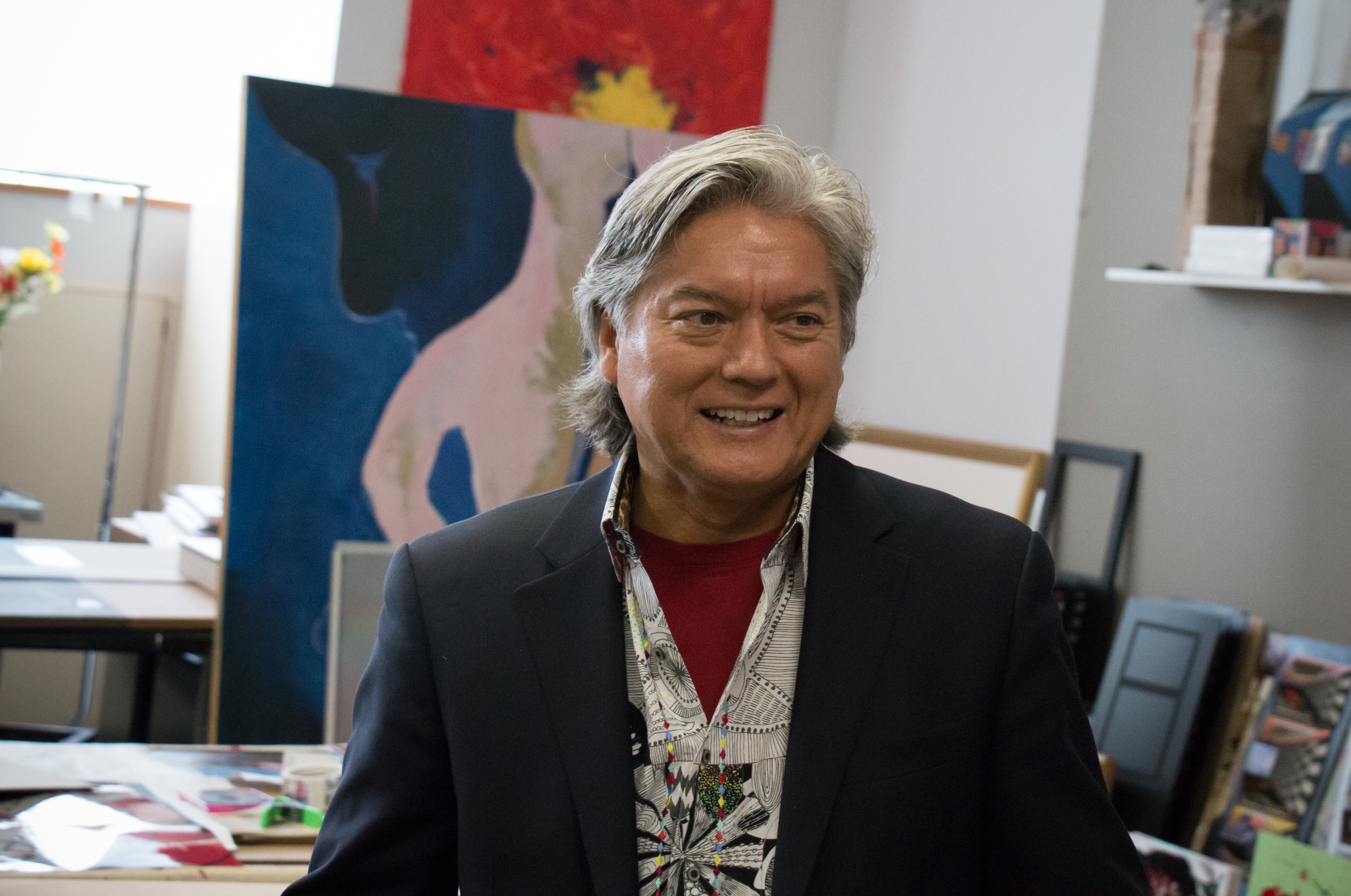
Dominic Pangborn in his studio in Detroit, Michigan

Dominic Pangborn is a Korean-American artist and graphic designer.

== Early years ==
Dominic Pangborn was born in Chungcheong Province, Korea, in 1952 during the Korean War.

Pangborn never met his father, an American serviceman. He lived with his mother, a Korean villager, for the majority of his childhood. At the age of 10, Pangborn’s mother was able to send him to the United States with the support and assistance of an American Catholic missionary, Fr. Vincent Hoffman, in the hope that he would have an easier and more prosperous life not obtainable for a multiethnic Korean at that time. In America, Dominic was adopted by Fr. Hoffman's sister and her husband, Mary and Spencer Pangborn. He spent his adolescence acclimating to his new country and bonding with his American family including 11 siblings, 4 uncles, 4 aunts, and 40 cousins in Jackson, Michigan. He attended Lumen Christi High School.

His story is one of 26 included in the book “After the Morning Calm: Reflections of Korean Adoptees.”

== Art education ==
Pangborn graduated from Lumen Christi High School, in Jackson, Michigan, then at his father’s suggestion, decided to pursue an education in art.

He studied at the Chicago Academy of Fine Arts, where he majored in graphic design. He attended the Syracuse University Illustrators Workshop and served later as a professor at the College for Creative Studies in Detroit. He received an Honorary Doctorate from Detroit’s Marygrove College.

== Design ==
In 1978 Pangborn, moved from Chicago to Detroit, and in 1979 he opened Pangborn Design, Ltd. Over the years, his clients included Kmart, Sears, General Motors, Chrysler, and Procter & Gamble.

His work using folded and pull-out paper elements for Wolverine World Wide’s Annual report is included in the 2001 book “Paper Graphics: The Power of Paper in Graphic Design.” He provided the graphic art poster for the 2006 North American International Auto Show.

He expanded his studio to include locations in Chicago, New York, and Tokyo. In addition to graphic arts, he launched a line of neckwear that was sold at retailers included Saks Fifth Avenue and Nordstrom.

Along with the neckwear, Pangborn designs furniture, home accessories and textiles. His retail stores, Pangborn Design Collection, and other retailers sell Pangborn Design Label merchandise.

== Fine art ==
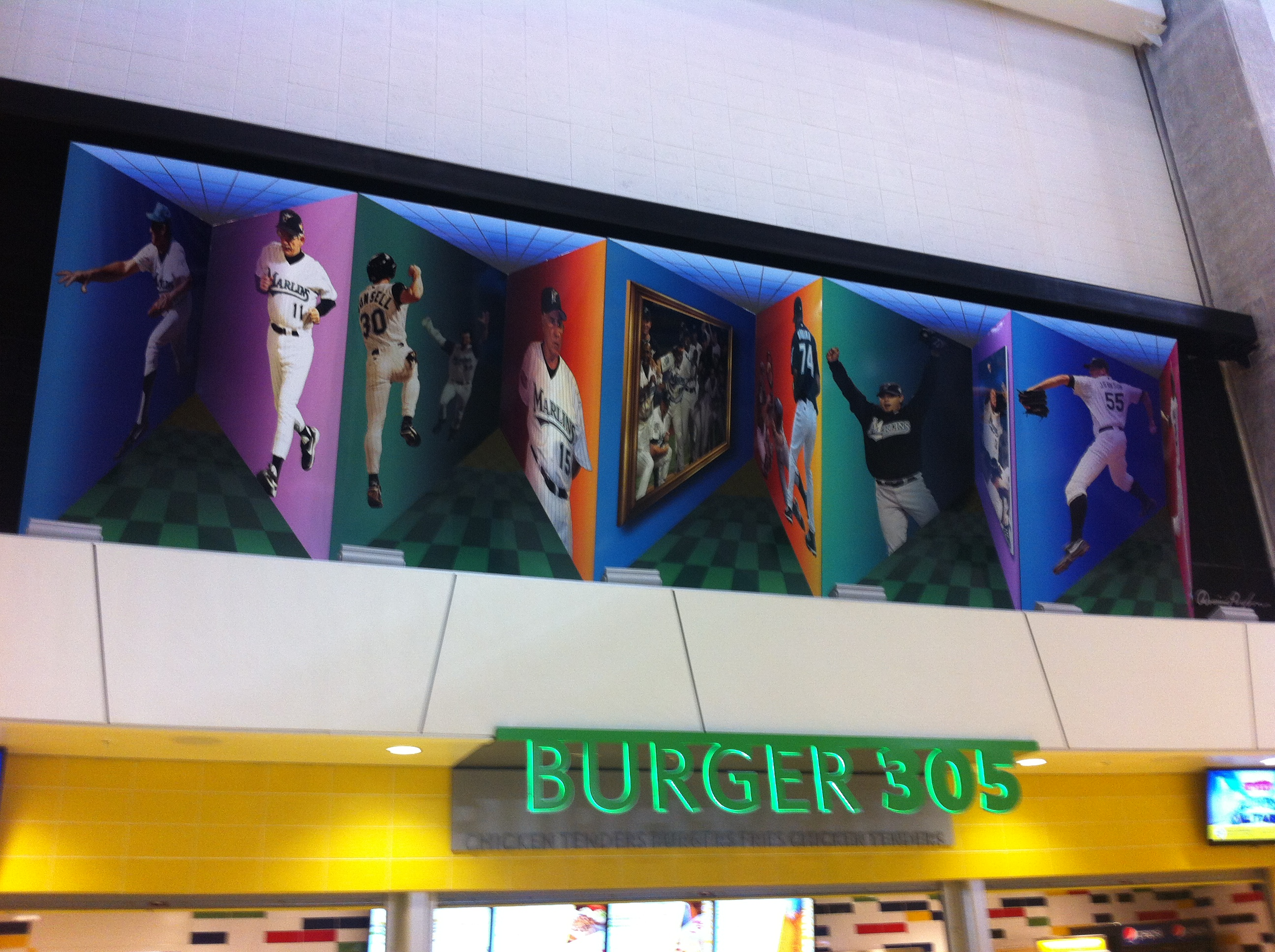
Pangborn's "Baseball in Motion" at the Miami Marlins stadium.

Pangborn shifted his focus to fine art in 2007 using various media, including painting and sculpting. Pangborn’s 40-foot work “Baseball in Motion” is displayed at the Miami Marlins Park, and his art-in-motion “Stations of the Cross” hangs in the Father Solanus Casey Center at the St. Bonaventure Monastery in Detroit, where he has worked to aid fundraising efforts of the monastery's soup kitchen. In 2012, he was featured in an hour-long Korean television special called "Global Success."

In July 2014, he opened a three-month-long, 60-piece retrospective exhibit of his design and art career at the Ella Sharp Museum of Art and History in Jackson, Michigan.

His fine art work has been published in Playboy magazine and is collected and sold around the world through Park West Gallery.

He says his greatest influences are Joseph Mallard William Turner and Leonardo da Vinci.
