= Jackson Area Transportation Authority =

Bus service in Jackson County, Michigan, USA

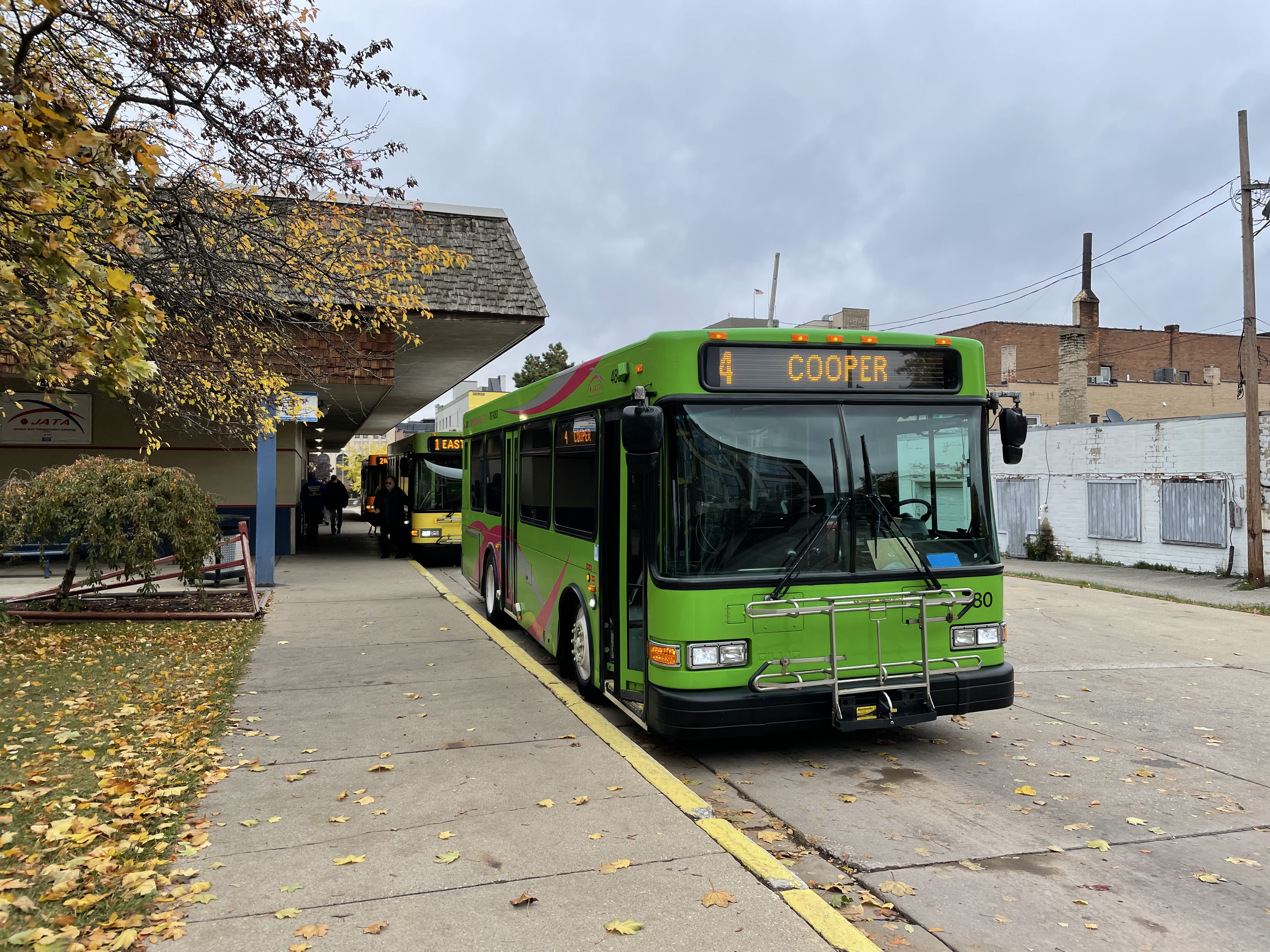
- A JATA bus at the downtown transit center
- Service area: Jackson County, Michigan
- Service type: Bus service; Paratransit
- Routes: 9
- Stations: JATA Transfer Center, 127 W Cortland St
- Annual ridership: 516,837 (2019)
- Website: mijata.org

The Jackson Area Transportation Authority is the primary provider of mass transportation in Jackson County, Michigan. Nine routes provide service from Monday through Saturday.

== Route list ==
- 1 East Michigan Avenue
- 2 West Michigan Avenue
- 3 South West Avenue
- 4 Cooper Street
- 5 Lansing Avenue
- 6 MLK/Francis Street
- 7 Ganson/Blackman
- 8 Jackson College
- 9 Soper

== JATA Transfer Center ==
The JATA Transfer Center, located at 127 West Cortland Street, serves as the primary transfer hub for the JATA system. The facility provides an indoor waiting area for passengers and serves Greyhound Lines and Indian Trails intercity buses.

== Fixed route ridership ==
The ridership statistics shown here are of fixed route services only and do not include demand response services.

== See also ==
- List of bus transit systems in the United States
- Jackson station
