= Summit Township, Jackson County, Michigan =

Summit Township, Michigan
- Civil township
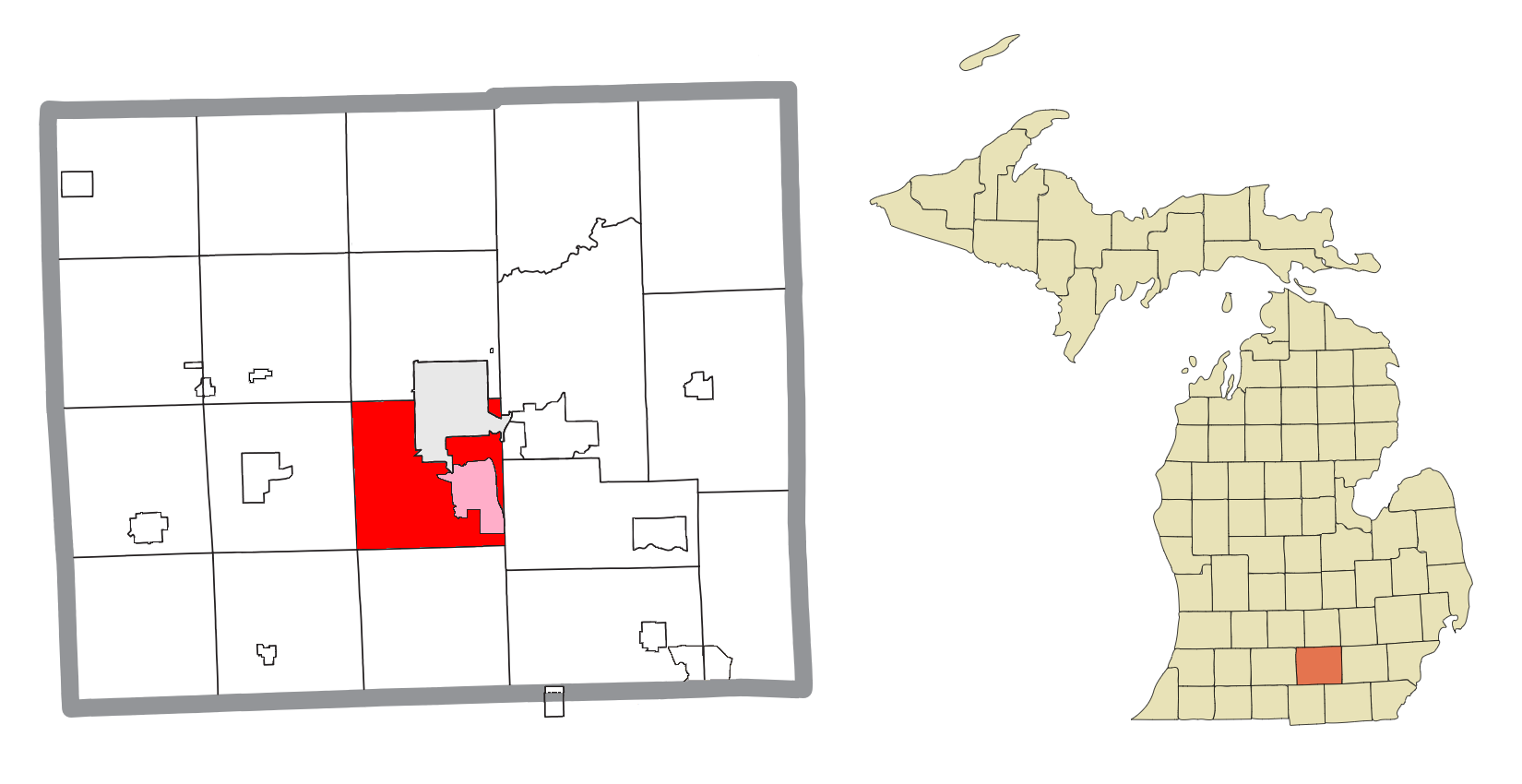
- Location within Jackson County (red) and the administered community of Vandercook Lake (pink)

- Location within the state of Michigan Summit Township (the United States)
- Coordinates: 42°12′33″N 84°25′10″W
- Country: United States
- State: Michigan
- County: Jackson

Government
  - Supervisor: Jim Dunn
  - Clerk: Meghan Dobben

Area
  - Total: 30.01 sq mi (77.7 km^{2})
  - Land: 29.09 sq mi (75.3 km^{2})
  - Water: 0.92 sq mi (2.4 km^{2})
- Elevation: 958 ft (292 m)

Population (2020)
  - Total: 22,920
  - Density: 787.9/sq mi (304.2/km^{2})
- Time zone: UTC-5 (Eastern (EST))
  - Summer (DST): UTC-4 (EDT)
- ZIP code(s): 49201, 49203 (Jackson); 49246 (Horton)
- Area code: 517
- FIPS code: 26-77200
- GNIS feature ID: 1627135
- Website: Official website

Summit Township is a civil township of Jackson County in the U.S. state of Michigan. The population was 22,920 at the 2020 census.

== Communities ==
- Vandercook Lake is an unincorporated community and census-designated place within the township.

== Geography ==
According to the United States Census Bureau, the township has a total area of 30.01 square miles (77.73 km^{2}), of which 29.09 square miles (75.34 km^{2}) is land and 0.92 square miles (2.38 km^{2}) (3.07%) is water.

The Grand River flows northward through the southern and eastern parts of the township. Summit Township is in central Jackson County, bordered to the north by the city of Jackson, the county seat. The township encompasses the T3S R1W survey township.

== Demographics ==
As of the census of 2000, there were 21,534 people, 8,690 households, and 6,187 families residing in the township. The population density was 735.4 inhabitants per square mile (283.9/km^{2}). There were 9,109 housing units at an average density of 311.1 per square mile (120.1/km^{2}). The racial makeup of the township was 91.72% White, 4.21% African American, 0.26% Native American, 1.46% Asian, 0.08% Pacific Islander, 0.64% from other races, and 1.63% from two or more races. Hispanic or Latino of any race were 1.85% of the population.

There were 8,690 households, out of which 31.4% had children under the age of 18 living with them, 57.9% were married couples living together, 9.9% had a female householder with no husband present, and 28.8% were non-families. 25.2% of all households were made up of individuals, and 12.4% had someone living alone who was 65 years of age or older. The average household size was 2.46 and the average family size was 2.93.

In the township the population was spread out, with 25.0% under the age of 18, 6.3% from 18 to 24, 26.3% from 25 to 44, 24.6% from 45 to 64, and 17.8% who were 65 years of age or older. The median age was 40 years. For every 100 females, there were 91.5 males. For every 100 females age 18 and over, there were 88.7 males.

The median income for a household in the township was $50,492, and the median income for a family was $57,182. Males had a median income of $43,249 versus $27,823 for females. The per capita income for the township was $25,738. About 3.7% of families and 5.1% of the population were below the poverty line, including 7.1% of those under age 18 and 4.0% of those age 65 or over.
