= Jackson, Michigan =

- City
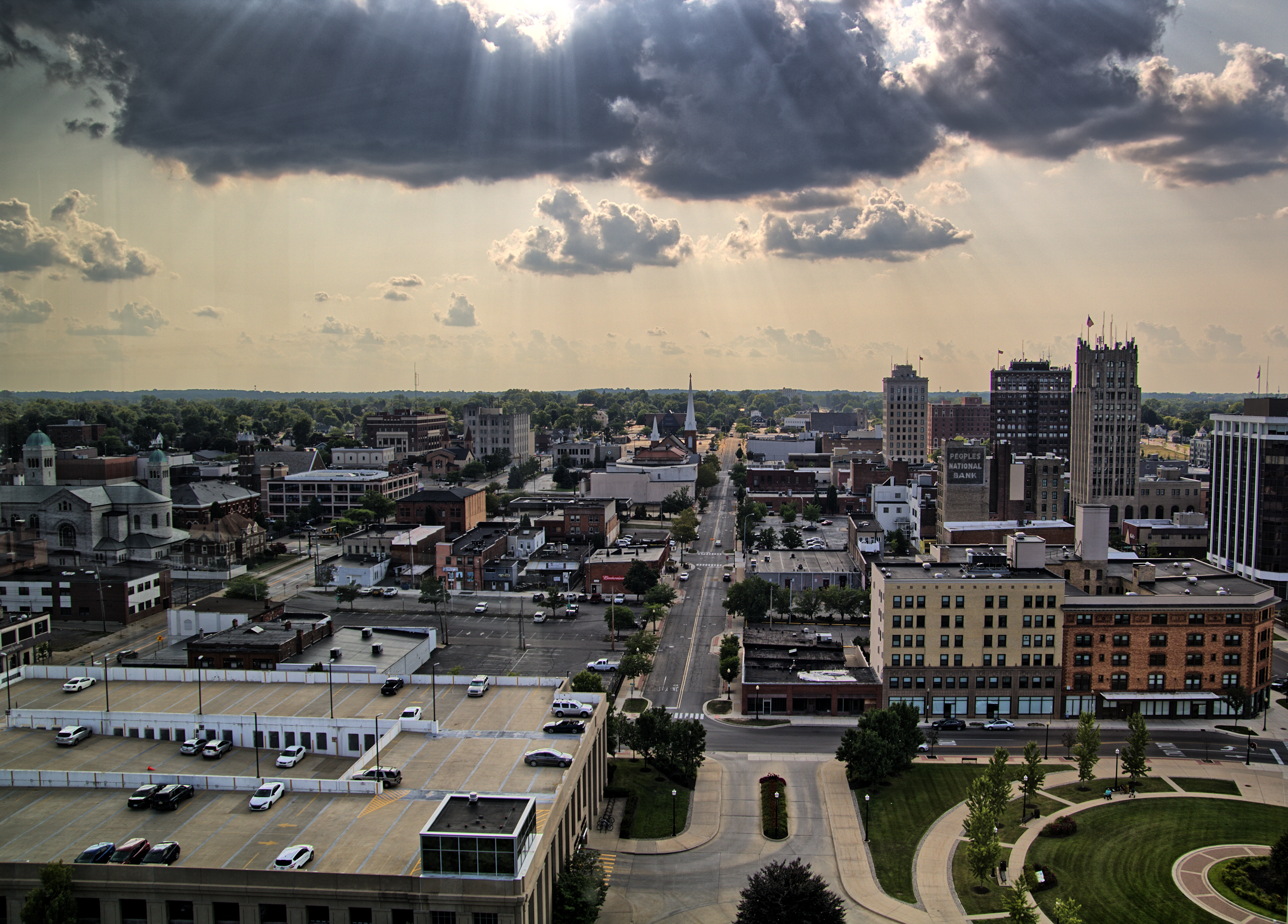
- Downtown Jackson from the 12th floor of One Energy Plaza (CMS Energy headquarters)

- Flag Logo
- Nickname: The Rose City
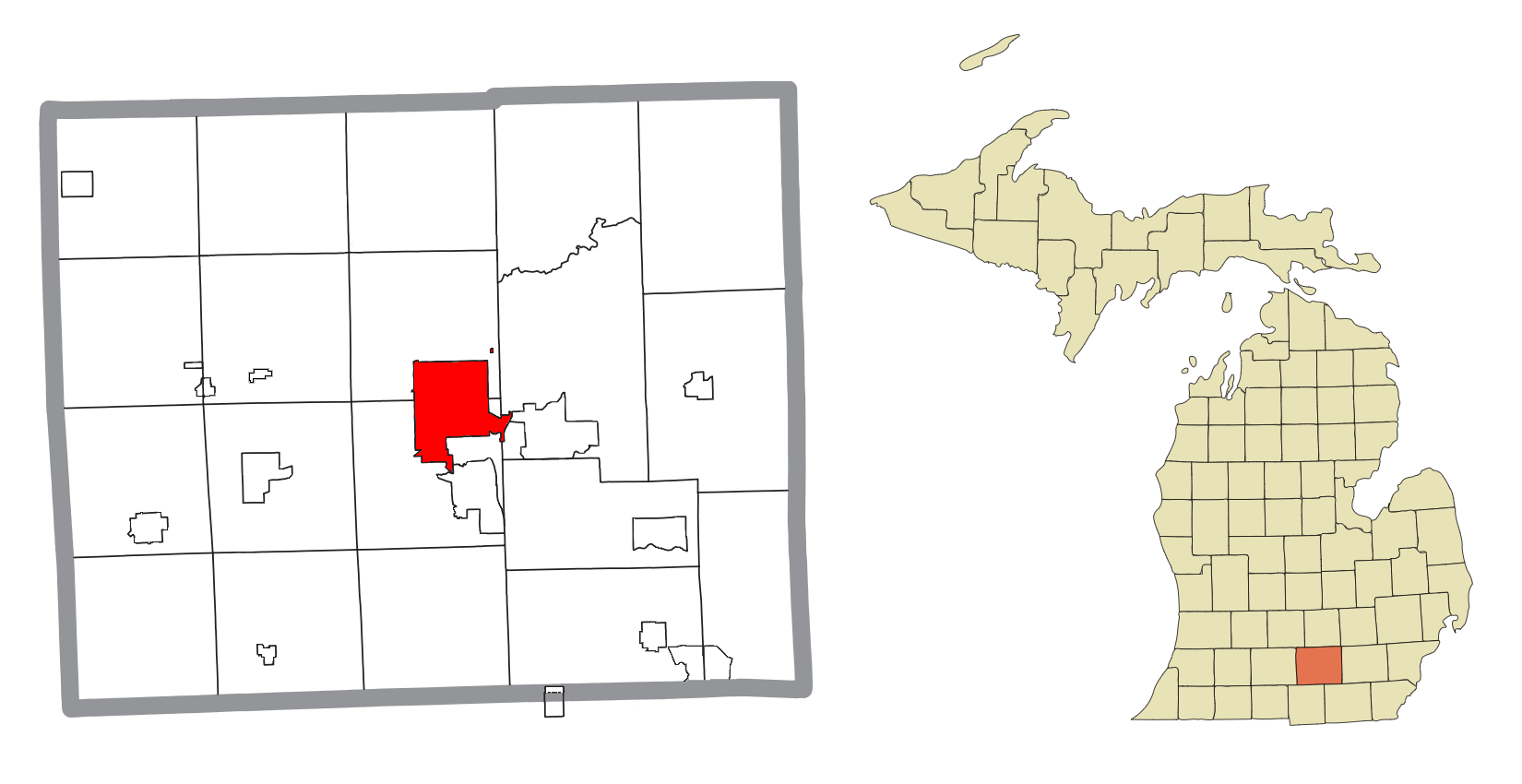
- Location within Jackson County

- Location within the state of Michigan Location within the United States
- Coordinates: 42°14′39″N 84°24′26″W
- Country: United States
- State: Michigan
- County: Jackson
- Founded: 1829
- Incorporated: 1843 (village); 1857 (city)

Government
  - Type: Mayor–council
  - Mayor: Daniel Mahoney
  - Manager: Jonathan Greene
  - Clerk: Andrea Muray

Area
  - City: 10.96 sq mi (28.38 km^{2})
  - Land: 10.84 sq mi (28.07 km^{2})
  - Water: 0.12 sq mi (0.30 km^{2})
- Elevation: 932 ft (284 m)

Population (2020)
  - City: 31,309
  - Density: 2,889/sq mi (1,115.4/km^{2})
  - Metro: 160,366 (US: 264th)
- Time zone: UTC−5 (EST)
  - Summer (DST): UTC−4 (EDT)
- ZIP Codes: 49201–49204
- Area code: 517
- FIPS code: 26-41420
- GNIS feature ID: 0629165
- Website: www.cityofjackson.org

Jackson is a city in Jackson County, Michigan, United States, and its county seat. The population was 31,309 at the 2020 census. It is served by Interstate 94 and U.S. Route 127. It is approximately 65 miles (105 km) east of Kalamazoo, 35 miles (56 km) west of Ann Arbor, 75 miles (121 km) west of Detroit and 35 miles (56 km) south of Lansing. Jackson is the core city of the Jackson metropolitan area, which includes all of Jackson County and has a population of 160,248.

The city was founded in 1829 and named after President Andrew Jackson. Michigan's first prison, Michigan State Prison (or Jackson State Prison), opened in 1838 and remains in operation.

== History ==
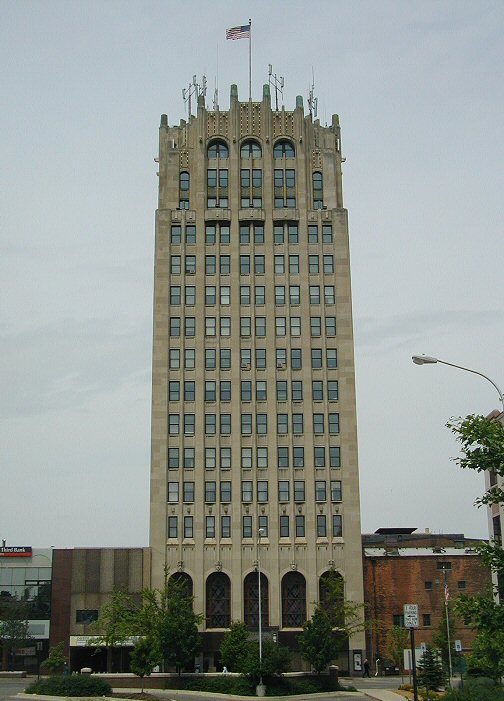
Jackson County Tower, Jackson's tallest building

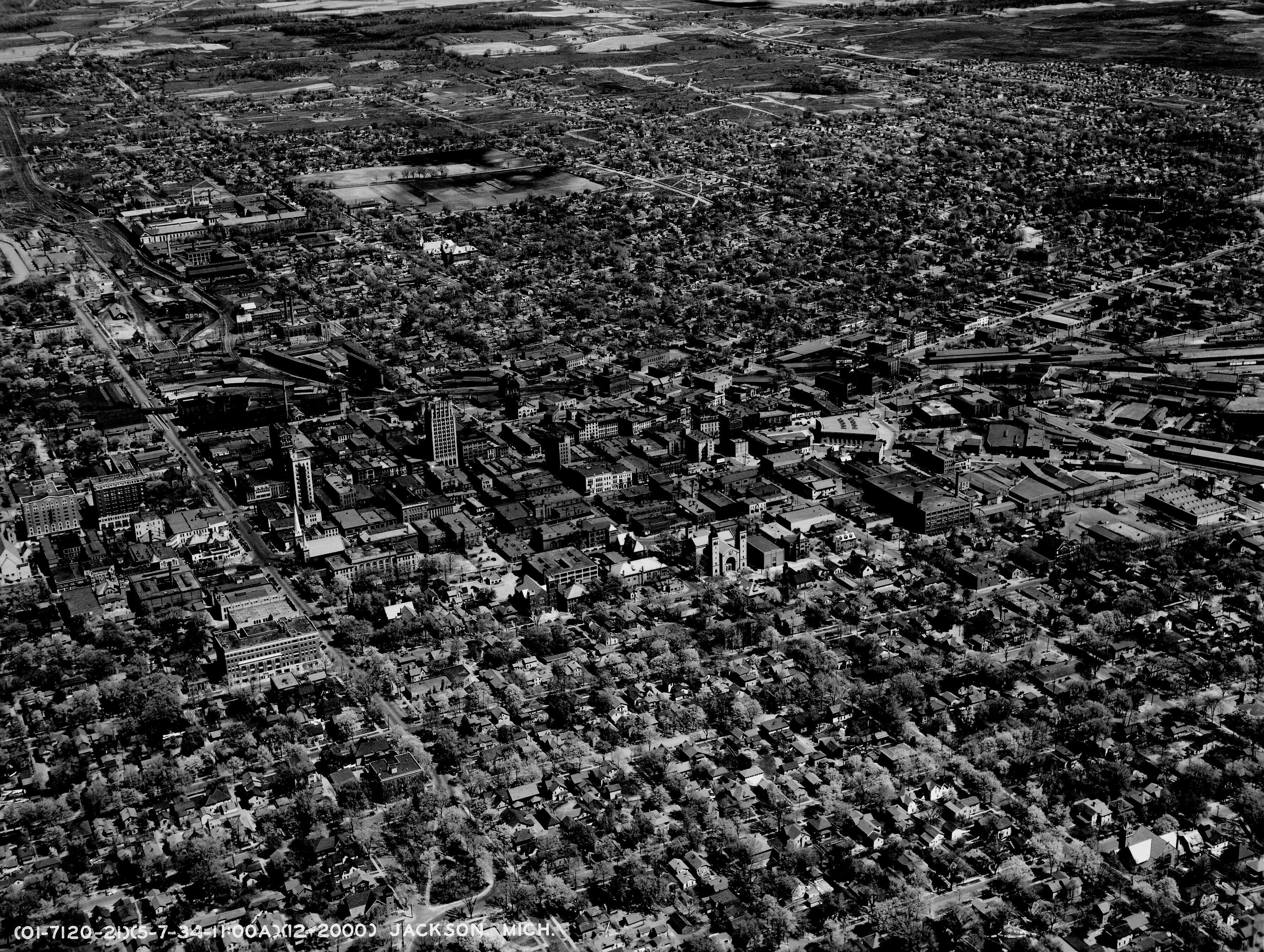
Aerial view of the city in 1934

On July 3, 1829, Horace Blackman, accompanied by Alexander Laverty, a land surveyor, and Pewytum, an Indian guide, forded the Grand River and made camp for the night at a site now marked as Trail and N. Jackson Street. They arrived there along a well-traveled Native American trail leading west from Ann Arbor. Blackman had hired Laverty and Pewytum to guide him west. Returning to Ann Arbor and Monroe, Blackman registered his claim for 160 acres (65 ha) at two dollars an acre.

He returned to the Jackson area in August 1829 with his brother Russell. Together they cleared land and built a cabin at what would become the corner of Ingham and Trail streets. The town was first called Jacksonopolis. Later, it was renamed Jacksonburgh. Finally in 1838, the town's name was changed to simply Jackson.

=== Birthplace of the Republican Party – "Under the Oaks" ===
Jackson is one of the birthplaces of the Republican Party. The first official meeting of the group that called itself "Republican" was held in Jackson on July 6, 1854. A Michigan historical marker at what is now the northwest corner of Second and Franklin streets in Jackson commemorates an anti-slavery county convention held that day. Meeting outside to avoid a hot, overcrowded hall, the group ultimately selected a slate of candidates for state elections. The marker identifies this as the birth of the Republican Party. The site, an oak grove on "Morgan's Forty," then on the outskirts of town, became known as "Under the Oaks."

The political party formally recognizes its birthplace as being Ripon, Wisconsin, where the name "Republican" was first suggested in March 1854. But, Republican presidents have visited Jackson and this marker.

Crawfordsville, Iowa also has a claim as the birthplace of the party: the first private meeting of what would become the Republican Party occurred when Whig Party defectors met privately in Crawfordsville in February 1854. The meeting was to lay the groundwork for the creation of a new political party.

=== Auto industry ===
Before Detroit began building cars on assembly lines in 1910, Jackson factories were making parts for cars and assembling them. By 1910, the auto industry had become Jackson's main industry. More than 20 different brands of cars were once made in Jackson, including: Reeves, Jaxon, Jackson, CarterCar, Orlo, Whiting, Butcher and Gage; Buick, Janney, Globe, Steel Swallow, C.V.I., Imperial, Ames-Dean, Cutting, Standard Electric, Duck, Briscoe, Argo, Hollier, Hackett, Marion-Handly, Gem, Earl, Wolverine, and Kaiser-Darrin. Ye Ole Carriage Shop in Spring Arbor displays more than 60 antique and classic cars, including five one-and-onlys and 16 made in Jackson. One of these is a 1902 JAXON. Today the auto parts industry remains one of the largest employers of skilled machine operators in Jackson County. The city was also an early site for the moped parts industry.

=== Birthplace of the Coney Island hot dog ===
In 1914 Macedonian immigrant George Todoroff founded the first "Coney Island restaurant" and created his famous Coney Island hot dog topping. His Coney Island restaurant was located directly in front of the railroad station on East Michigan Avenue and was open 24 hours. The restaurant proved to be a popular dining option for rail passengers. Over the course of 31 years, Todoroff sold more than 17 million Coney Island hot dogs.

Today two "Coney Island" restaurants unaffiliated with Todoroff's are located in a building near the train station on East Michigan Avenue: Virginia Coney Island and Jackson Coney Island. In addition, several area restaurants throughout the Jackson area offer their own version of the Coney Island hot dog, or just "coney," as it is referred to by local residents. Jackson's version of the coney dog is distinctly different from those featured in Detroit-area Coney Island restaurants or other Coney Island restaurants throughout Michigan and the Midwest. In 2014 Todoroff's Coney Island celebrated its centenary.

=== Michigan's first state prison (1838–1934) ===
The legislature authorized Michigan's first state prison in 1838. A temporary wooden prison, enclosed by a fence of tamarack poles, was built on 60 acres donated for that purpose inside the city limits of Jackson. In 1839 the first 35 prisoners were received. A permanent prison was built three years later.

Beginning in the 1850s, Warden H.F. Hatch placed more emphasis on the education and rehabilitation of prisoners. By 1882, Michigan's First State Prison (1838–1934) had developed as the largest walled prison in the world. Within its walls, the factories and surrounding farms, manned by cheap inmate labor, made Jackson one of the leading industrial cities in the nation. In 1934 a new prison was completed just north of Jackson's city limit in Blackman Township; it took all of the state prisoners.

The historic building is now used as an artists' resident community, known as the Armory Arts Village. Tours of the original prison site on Cooper Street are available through the Original Jackson Historic Prison Tours. A closed, fully intact cell block at the modern prison in Blackman Township was operated as the Cell Block 7 Prison Museum from 2014-2019. Independently operated by the accredited Ella Sharp Museum, this was the only museum where visitors could enter a closed cell block on the grounds of an active prison for a self-guided tour.

=== Corset industry (1860s–1920s) ===
Numerous railroad connections were constructed to Jackson, linking it to many markets. The local invention of the duplex corset by Bortree helped make Jackson a center of corset manufacturing. By the early 20th century, as many as 16 manufacturers of women's corsets operated here; the majority were located on Cortland and Pearl streets.

As elastics were adopted in manufacturing and fashions changed, the corset industry quickly declined. The majority of the corset manufacturers in Jackson closed their doors by 1920. Only three of the original corset companies survived past the 1920s, by changing their production to therapeutic and prosthetic support garments and devices.

"The First" Moses Bortree founded the Bortree Corset Company, the first corset manufacturer outside of New York, in 1868 at 112 W. Cortland. Founded to make crinoline skirts and bustles (hoop skirts!), they began manufacturing Bortree's newest creation, the Duplex Corset, in 1875. Within five years, production rose from 50,000 to 300,000 corsets per year.

"The Biggest" Founded in 1884, the Jackson Corset Co. became the largest manufacturer of corset and waist garments in the US. Located at 209-215 W. Cortland St., they employed almost 300 people by 1895.

"Woman-Owned" The Coronet Corset Manufactory opened in 1880 at 146 W. Main St. and later moved to 131-133 W. Pearl St. Coronet had the distinction of being run by the first and only female president, Mrs. C.A. McGee, who invented and patented the Coronet Corset.

== Geography ==
According to the United States Census Bureau, the city has a total area of 10.98 square miles (28.44 km^{2}), of which 10.86 square miles (28.13 km^{2}) is land and 0.12 square miles (0.31 km^{2}) (1.09%) is water.

=== Climate ===
This climate region is typified by large seasonal temperature differences, with warm to hot (and often humid) summers and cold (sometimes severely cold) winters. According to the Köppen climate classification system, Jackson has a humid continental climate, abbreviated "Dfb" on climate maps.

Climate data for Jackson Reynolds Field, Michigan (1991–2020 normals, extremes 1944–present)
Month	Jan	Feb	Mar	Apr	May	Jun	Jul	Aug	Sep	Oct	Nov	Dec	Year
Record high °F (°C)	71 (22)	69 (21)	85 (29)	88 (31)	95 (35)	101 (38)	103 (39)	102 (39)	100 (38)	90 (32)	79 (26)	69 (21)	103 (39)
Mean maximum °F (°C)	53.0 (11.7)	54.3 (12.4)	69.0 (20.6)	78.2 (25.7)	85.3 (29.6)	91.1 (32.8)	91.7 (33.2)	90.2 (32.3)	87.3 (30.7)	79.4 (26.3)	65.8 (18.8)	55.1 (12.8)	93.6 (34.2)
Mean daily maximum °F (°C)	31.3 (−0.4)	34.5 (1.4)	45.3 (7.4)	58.5 (14.7)	69.8 (21.0)	78.9 (26.1)	82.5 (28.1)	80.4 (26.9)	73.6 (23.1)	61.1 (16.2)	47.7 (8.7)	36.2 (2.3)	58.3 (14.6)
Daily mean °F (°C)	24.4 (−4.2)	26.6 (−3.0)	36.0 (2.2)	47.8 (8.8)	58.8 (14.9)	68.0 (20.0)	71.6 (22.0)	69.9 (21.1)	62.6 (17.0)	51.2 (10.7)	39.9 (4.4)	29.9 (−1.2)	48.9 (9.4)
Mean daily minimum °F (°C)	17.5 (−8.1)	18.6 (−7.4)	26.7 (−2.9)	37.1 (2.8)	47.7 (8.7)	57.1 (13.9)	60.7 (15.9)	59.4 (15.2)	51.7 (10.9)	41.4 (5.2)	32.1 (0.1)	23.6 (−4.7)	39.5 (4.2)
Mean minimum °F (°C)	−5.0 (−20.6)	−1.3 (−18.5)	7.2 (−13.8)	21.7 (−5.7)	32.3 (0.2)	42.1 (5.6)	48.2 (9.0)	46.8 (8.2)	36.7 (2.6)	26.8 (−2.9)	17.0 (−8.3)	4.7 (−15.2)	−8.3 (−22.4)
Record low °F (°C)	−20 (−29)	−19 (−28)	−7 (−22)	3 (−16)	21 (−6)	34 (1)	37 (3)	37 (3)	27 (−3)	16 (−9)	−5 (−21)	−14 (−26)	−20 (−29)
Average precipitation inches (mm)	1.67 (42)	1.52 (39)	1.93 (49)	2.94 (75)	3.40 (86)	3.58 (91)	3.35 (85)	3.81 (97)	2.98 (76)	2.92 (74)	2.33 (59)	1.76 (45)	32.19 (818)
Average snowfall inches (cm)	10.8 (27)	7.3 (19)	6.2 (16)	1.5 (3.8)	0.0 (0.0)	0.0 (0.0)	0.0 (0.0)	0.0 (0.0)	0.0 (0.0)	0.1 (0.25)	2.9 (7.4)	8.5 (22)	37.3 (95.45)
Average extreme snow depth inches (cm)	7.2 (18)	7.3 (19)	4.6 (12)	1.1 (2.8)	0.0 (0.0)	0.0 (0.0)	0.0 (0.0)	0.0 (0.0)	0. (0)	0.1 (0.25)	1.9 (4.8)	5.0 (13)	10.1 (26)
Average precipitation days (≥ 0.01 in)	12.7	10.3	10.9	12.9	12.4	10.6	9.3	9.9	9.5	11.3	11.4	11.9	133.1
Average snowy days (≥ 0.1 in)	8.9	6.6	4.3	1.1	0.0	0.0	0.0	0.0	0.0	0.1	2.4	7.2	30.6
Source: NOAA (snow, snow days, snow depth 1944–2000)

== Demographics ==
Historical population
Census	Pop.	Note	%±
1850	2,363		—
1860	4,799		103.1%
1870	11,447		138.5%
1880	16,105		40.7%
1890	20,798		29.1%
1900	25,180		21.1%
1910	31,433		24.8%
1920	48,374		53.9%
1930	55,187		14.1%
1940	49,656		−10.0%
1950	51,088		2.9%
1960	50,720		−0.7%
1970	45,484		−10.3%
1980	39,739		−12.6%
1990	38,303		−3.6%
2000	36,316		−5.2%
2010	33,534		−7.7%
2020	31,309		−6.6%
2023 (est.)	30,854		−1.5%
U.S. Decennial Census; 2018 Estimate

=== Racial and ethnic composition ===
Jackson city, Michigan – Racial and ethnic composition Note: the US Census treats Hispanic/Latino as an ethnic category. This table excludes Latinos from the racial categories and assigns them to a separate category. Hispanics/Latinos may be of any race.
Race / Ethnicity (NH = Non-Hispanic)	Pop 2000	Pop 2010	Pop 2020	% 2000	% 2010	% 2020
White alone (NH)	26,204	23,062	20,279	72.16%	68.77%	64.77%
Black or African American alone (NH)	7,069	6,727	5,907	19.47%	20.06%	18.87%
Native American or Alaska Native alone (NH)	187	107	92	0.51%	0.32%	0.29%
Asian alone (NH)	183	235	331	0.50%	0.70%	1.06%
Native Hawaiian or Pacific Islander alone (NH)	13	7	7	0.04%	0.02%	0.02%
Other race alone (NH)	65	58	130	0.18%	0.17%	0.42%
Mixed race or Multiracial (NH)	1,126	1,569	2,444	3.10%	4.68%	7.81%
Hispanic or Latino (any race)	1,469	1,769	2,119	4.05%	5.28%	6.77%
Total	36,316	33,534	31,309	100.00%	100.00%	100.00%

=== 2020 census ===
As of the 2020 census, Jackson had a population of 31,309. The median age was 35.0 years. 26.0% of residents were under the age of 18 and 13.5% of residents were 65 years of age or older. For every 100 females there were 95.3 males, and for every 100 females age 18 and over there were 92.2 males age 18 and over.

52.7% of residents lived in urban areas, while 47.3% lived in rural areas.

There were 12,727 households in Jackson, of which 30.8% had children under the age of 18 living in them. Of all households, 28.3% were married-couple households, 25.2% were households with a male householder and no spouse or partner present, and 36.2% were households with a female householder and no spouse or partner present. About 35.6% of all households were made up of individuals and 11.3% had someone living alone who was 65 years of age or older.

There were 14,163 housing units, of which 10.1% were vacant. The homeowner vacancy rate was 3.3% and the rental vacancy rate was 9.5%.

Racial composition as of the 2020 census
Race	Number	Percent
White	20,917	66.8%
Black or African American	6,058	19.3%
American Indian and Alaska Native	144	0.5%
Asian	339	1.1%
Native Hawaiian and Other Pacific Islander	7	0.0%
Some other race	775	2.5%
Two or more races	3,069	9.8%

=== 2010 census ===
As of the census of 2010, there were 33,534 people, 13,294 households, and 7,872 families residing in the city. The population density was 3,085.0 inhabitants per square mile (1,191.1/km^{2}). There were 15,457 housing units at an average density of 1,422.0 per square mile (549.0/km^{2}). The racial makeup of the city was 71.4% White, 20.4% African American, 0.4% Native American, 0.7% Asian, 1.6% from other races, and 5.5% from two or more races. Hispanic or Latino residents of any race were 5.3% of the population.

There were 13,294 households, of which 35.8% had children under the age of 18 living with them, 30.7% were married couples living together, 22.4% had a female householder with no husband present, 6.1% had a male householder with no wife present, and 40.8% were non-families. 33.9% of all households were made up of individuals, and 9.7% had someone living alone who was 65 years of age or older. The average household size was 2.46 and the average family size was 3.14.

The median age in the city was 32.2 years. 28.5% of residents were under the age of 18; 10.5% were between the ages of 18 and 24; 27.7% were from 25 to 44; 23.1% were from 45 to 64; and 10.3% were 65 years of age or older. The gender makeup of the city was 47.7% male and 52.3% female.

=== 2000 census ===
As of the census of 2000, there were 36,316 people, 14,210 households, and 8,668 families residing in the city. The population density was 3,274.9 inhabitants per square mile (1,264.4/km^{2}). There were 15,241 housing units at an average density of 1,374.4 per square mile (530.7/km^{2}). The racial makeup of the city was 73.87% White, 19.70% Black or African American, 0.56% Native American, 0.51% Asian, 0.04% Pacific Islander, 1.65% from other races, and 3.67% from two or more races. 4.05% of the population were Hispanic or Latino of any race.

There were 14,210 households, out of which 33.7% had children under the age of 18 living with them, 35.8% were married couples living together, 19.9% had a female householder with no husband present, and 39.0% were non-families. 32.0% of all households were made up of individuals, and 10.8% had someone living alone who was 65 years of age or older. The average household size was 2.48 and the average family size was 3.12.

In the city, 29.7% of the population was under the age of 18, 9.8% was from 18 to 24, 30.4% from 25 to 44, 18.2% from 45 to 64, and 11.9% was 65 years of age or older. The median age was 31 years. For every 100 females, there were 91.0 males. For every 100 females age 18 and over, there were 85.5 males.

The median income for a household in the city was $31,294, and the median income for a family was $39,072. Males had a median income of $31,957 versus $23,817 for females. The per capita income for the city was $15,230. About 15.2% of families and 19.6% of the population were below the poverty line, including 26.9% of those under age 18 and 11.0% of those age 65 or over.

=== Religion ===
Jackson has a number of notable historic churches, several of which were established prior to the American Civil War. The First Baptist Church was established in 1839; the present building, a Romanesque Revival structure, was dedicated in March 1872. The First Congregational Church is housed in a monumental Romanesque Revival building constructed in 1859. A basement was added after the structure had been in operation for several years. In 1871 the building was raised eight feet to accommodate lower-level classrooms. Its congregation has actively participated in local social reform efforts, becoming part of the antislavery movement in the 1840s and later supporting the temperance and the civil rights movement. St. Paul's Episcopal Church was also founded in 1839. The congregation's first church building, constructed in 1840, was replaced by a Romanesque Revival building in 1853; it is one of the oldest Episcopal Church structures in southern Michigan.

Constructed in 1857, St. John's the Evangelist Church is the oldest Roman Catholic church in the city. It was established as a mission in 1836 to serve a congregation that was originally predominately Irish immigrants. Given the following waves of Catholic immigrants from other countries, its congregation today is more diverse. St. Mary Star of the Sea was established in 1881 as Jackson's second Catholic church. The present building, a limestone Romanesque structure built between 1923 and 1926, incorporates elements of the parish's first church as well as stained glass windows, marble altars and communion rails imported from Italy and Austria. The first and only Eastern Orthodox Church is St. Demetrius Orthodox Church, founded in 1958. Among the modern churches in the town is Westwinds Community Church, a non-denominational, evangelical Christian church. Founded in 1865 in a blacksmith shop, Community Jackson African Methodist Episcopal Church became the first place of worship for African Americans in Jackson County.

Late 19th-century immigrants included Jews from Germany and eastern Europe. Jackson is home to Temple Beth Israel, a Reform synagogue founded in 1862 by German Jewish immigrants.

== Economy ==
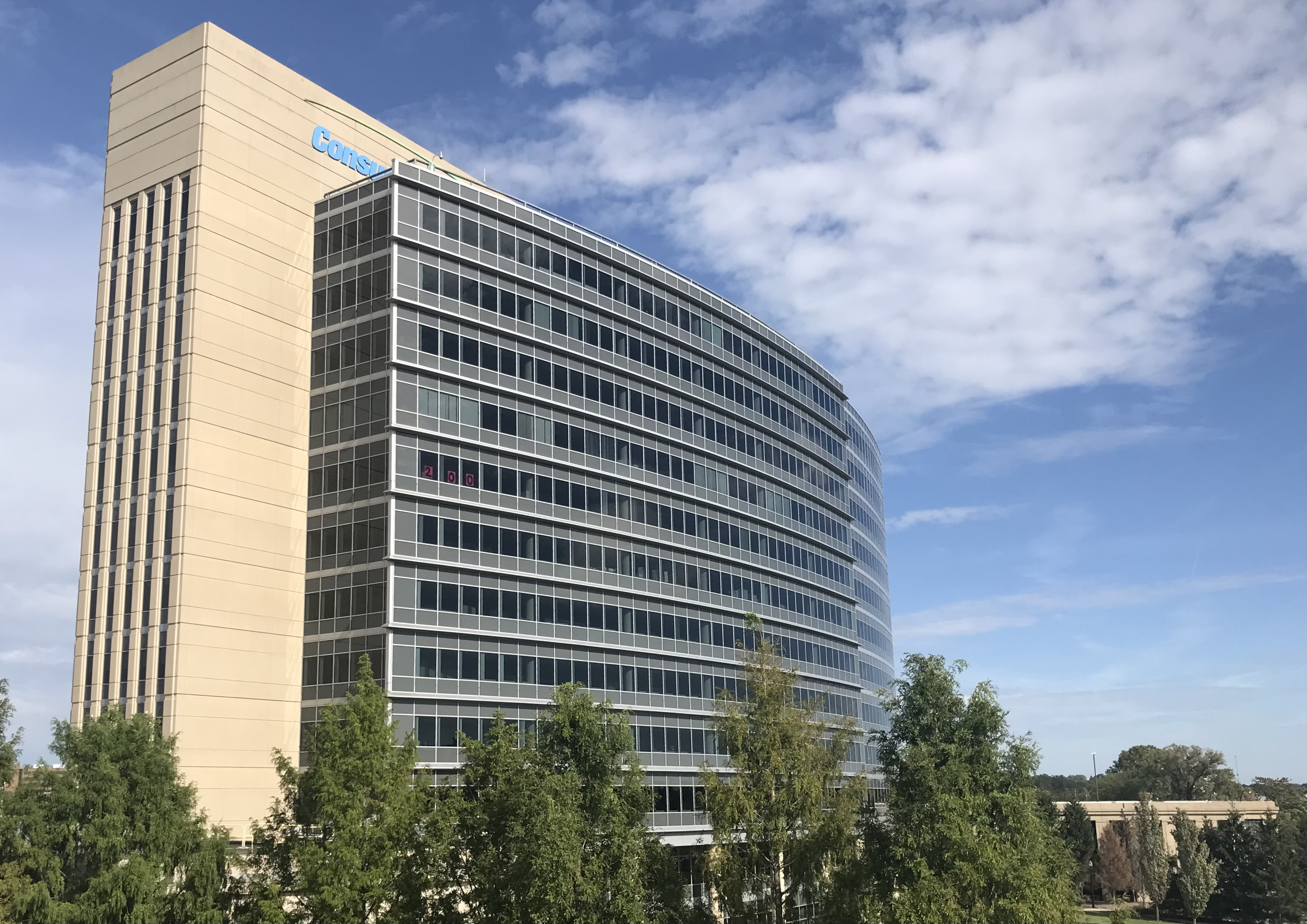
CMS Energy headquarters in downtown Jackson

Restructuring in heavy industry in the mid-20th century caused a decline in jobs and population in many industrial cities, including Jackson. There are three major private employers in the city. CMS Energy provides natural gas and electrical services to much of Michigan and has its international headquarters in the city. The next two major employers are Henry Ford Health (formerly Foote Hospital) and the Eaton Corporation.

Michigan Automotive Compressor, Inc. (MACI) is the largest manufacturer in Jackson County and its fourth-largest individual employer. In February 2009, due to the Great Recession, it began offering voluntary buyouts to employees.

Family-owned food manufacturer and distributor Dawn Foods has been based in Jackson since 1920.

Jackson Flexible Products, just outside the city, has been one of North America's premier custom-molded rubber specialists since 1969. The company employs over 35 people, providing components for the aerospace, automotive and defense industries.

Jackson's state prison complex includes the first state prison building, which was expanded and became known as the largest walled prison in the world.

Michigan State Prison moved to Blackman Charter Township in the 1930s. Portions of that prison complex closed in 2007, including the Annex of the Charles Egeler Reception and Guidance Center Annex (RGC) and the Southern Michigan Correctional Facility (JMF). One of the closed cell blocks at JMF has been adapted and re-opened as the Cell Block 7 Prison Museum.

The other facilities in the complex, including two in the old walled building, remain open: the G. Robert Cotton Correctional Facility (JCF), the Cooper Street Correctional Facility (JCS), the Charles Egeler Reception and Guidance Center (RGC), and the Parnall Correctional Facility (SMT).

== Parks and recreation ==
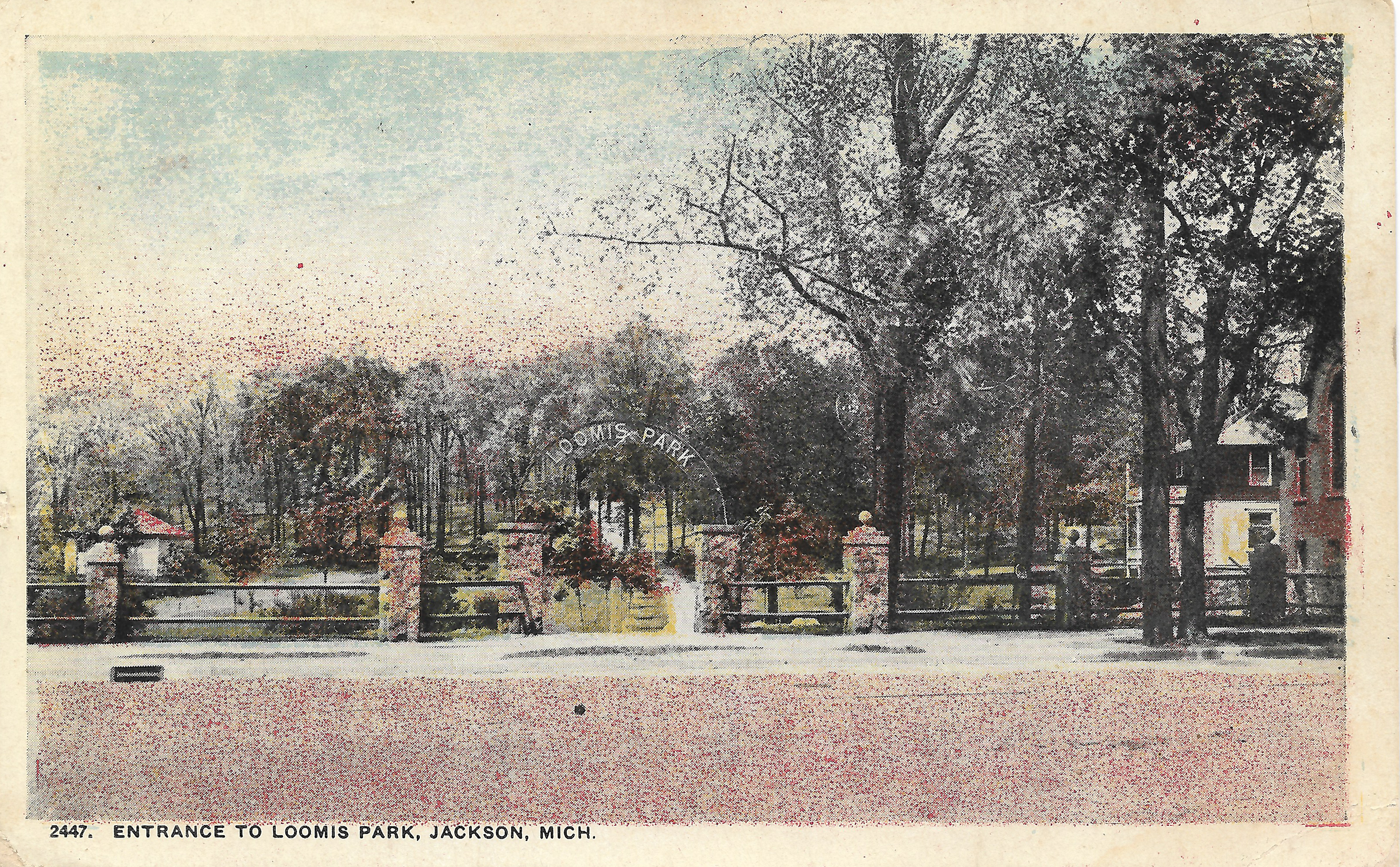
1921 postcard of Loomis Park

Jackson's parks and recreation department includes a golf course, swimming pool, sporting fields, and 26 parks, totaling 645 acres.

== Sports ==
JAX 60 Lanes in Jackson has hosted multiple professional ten-pin bowling events for the PBA Tour and PBA50 Tour. On July 16–23, 2023, the center hosted the inaugural PBA50 World Series of Bowling.

== Government ==
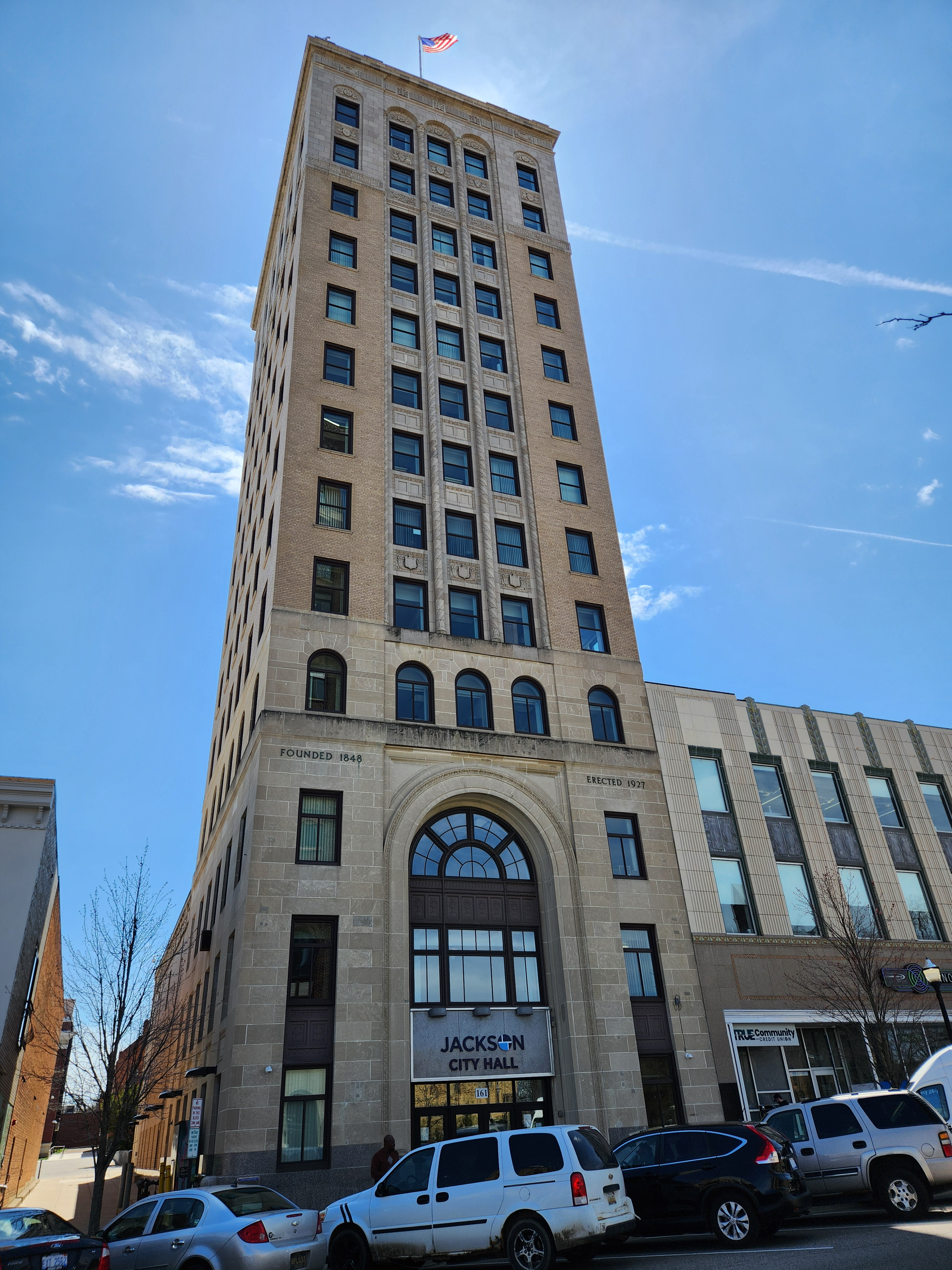
City Hall in downtown Jackson

The city levies an income tax of 1 percent on residents and 0.5 percent on nonresidents. Federally, Jackson is located in Michigan's 5th congressional district, represented by Republican Tim Walberg.

== Education ==
Almost all of the land in the city limits is within the Jackson Public Schools school district. The Jackson urbanized area is home to approximately 16 elementary public schools, as well as about 16 private or parochial schools. It also has a large public middle school (The Middle School at Parkside). It has nine high schools: the public Jackson High School, East Jackson Secondary School (Public), Parma Western High School, and Northwest High School, T. A. Wilson Academy, Napoleon High School, and Vandercook Lake High School; and the private DaVinci Institute (Charter), Jackson Preparatory and Early College (Charter), and Jackson Christian School (Non-Denom), and Lumen Christi Catholic School (Catholic).

The city is also home to institutions of adult and higher education: Jackson College (formerly Jackson Community College), Baker College, Career Quest Learning Centers, and Spring Arbor University. An additional 15 higher education institutions are within a one-hour drive of Jackson County.

== Transportation ==
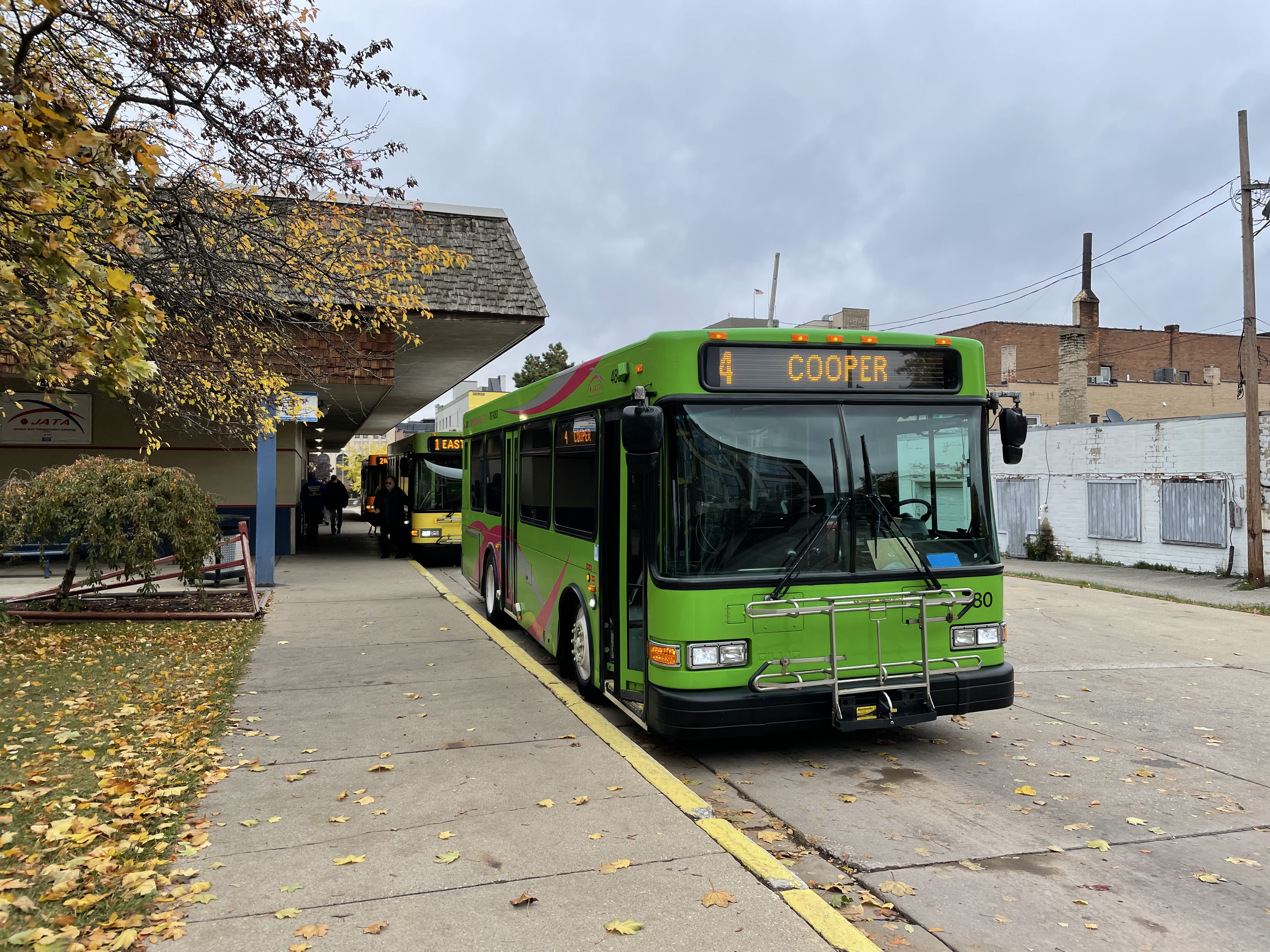
Jackson Area Transportation Authority buses at the JATA Transfer Center

From the late nineteenth century into the mid-twentieth century, Jackson was a major railway hub and for over a century has been known as the crossroads of Michigan. Today the Michigan Central Railroad Jackson Depot on East Michigan Avenue is the nation's oldest train station in continuous active use. It was listed on the National Register of Historic Places in 2002.

Amtrak, the national passenger rail system, provides service to Jackson, operating its Wolverine three times daily in each direction between Chicago and Pontiac, Michigan, via Detroit.

Jackson and Lansing Railroad (JAIL) owns a line from Jackson to Lansing, Michigan. Norfolk Southern (NS) owns a yard in Jackson as well.

=== Major highways ===
The junction of I-94 and US 127 was built at Jackson.

- I-94
- BL I-94
- US 127 is a north–south highway providing access northerly toward Lansing and Clare and southerly into Ohio. In the Jackson area, US 127 runs concurrently with I-94 for approximately four miles (6.4 km). It is freeway from Jackson northerly past Lansing, while the freeway south of Jackson quickly transitions to a two-lane, uncontrolled access highway.
- Bus. US 127 is a loop route running through downtown, connecting with US 127 at either end.
- M-50 enters Jackson from the northwest, and exits southeast of town.
- M-60 approaches Jackson from the southwest, ending at I-94 west of the city.
- M-106 enters Jackson from the northeast and ends downtown.

=== Airport ===
Reynolds Field at Jackson County Airport is the main airport for the city. It hosted commercial service, primarily under the North Central Airlines banner, until 1984. With the "Blue Goose" aircraft now gone, the airport today operates as a general aviation facility. The 700-acre airport, equipped with an ILS system, is located just south of I-94 ( Airport Road exit #137). More than 100 general aviation aircraft are housed here, ranging from single-engine planes to business/corporate jet aircraft.

The Airport is home to many related businesses, including the Jackson College Flight School, a restaurant, bar, and car rental. The Jackson Blues Festival is held here annually in June.

=== Public transportation ===
Jackson Area Transportation Authority operates ten routes Monday through Saturday out of a central station located downtown. Indian Trails and Greyhound Lines offer intercity service from the JATA station. In addition to the publicly funded JATA, there are four private taxicab companies operating in town.

== Notable people ==
- Khari Willis - National Football League player
- Claire Allen — architect
- Fairuza Balk — actress, musician, and visual artist; lived here until the age of two with her mother, Cathryn Balk
- Austin Blair — governor of Michigan during Civil War
- Kara Braxton — WNBA basketball player
- Carl Christensen — soccer player and coach
- Dan Coats — U.S. congressman and senator, representing Indiana, and Director of National Intelligence 2017-2019
- Tim Crabtree — Major League Baseball pitcher
- Philip Campbell Curtis — artist
- Tony Dungy — National Football League player and coach, won Super Bowl XLI, 2016 Pro Football Hall of Fame inductee
- Paula Faris — television correspondent for ABC News and The View
- Idabelle Smith Firestone — songwriter, wife of tire mogul Harvey Samuel Firestone
- Louise V. Gustin — ragtime composer, born in Jackson
- Raymond Salvatore Harmon — artist
- Jack Harris — National Football League player
- Dave Hill — professional golfer
- Mike Hill — professional golfer
- Fred Janke — football player and mayor of Jackson
- David Johnson — jurist, lawyer, legislator
- Ruth Ward Kahn — writer
- Steven Kampfer — National Hockey League player, Stanley Cup champion 2011 with Boston Bruins
- Vivian Kellogg — All-American Girls Professional Baseball League player
- Karch Kiraly — Olympic gold medalist and pro volleyball player
- Cheslie Kryst — Miss USA 2019
- Mary Torrans Lathrap — poet, preacher, suffragist, social reformer
- Rick Lenz — actor
- Clarence Love — NFL player, Super Bowl champion with Baltimore Ravens
- Alfred Lucking — U.S. congressman
- Anna Theresa Berger Lynch — cornetist and trumpeter; lived and died in Jackson
- Gene Markey — decorated naval officer, screenwriter; married to Hedy Lamarr and Myrna Loy
- Carter Mazur — American ice hockey player for the Detroit Red Wings
- Tim McClelland — Major League Baseball umpire
- James McDivitt — NASA astronaut
- Harry Melling — NASCAR team owner, won two Daytona 500s
- Charles W. Misner — physicist, author of Gravitation
- Marcus Norris — basketball player
- Tyler Oakley — YouTuber and LGBT activist
- Rasmea Odeh — convicted of immigration fraud, for concealing her arrest, conviction, and imprisonment for fatal terrorist bombing
- Jack Paar — television personality, host of Tonight Starring Jack Paar, predecessor of Johnny Carson
- Dominic Pangborn — Korean-American artist and graphic designer
- Pat Patrick — IndyCar team owner and three-time Indy 500 champion owner
- Alonzo Sargent — locomotive engineer
- Potter Stewart — associate justice of the United States Supreme Court (1958-1981)
- Wilbur F. Storey – publisher and editor, founder of Jackson Patriot, owned Detroit Free Press
- Brian Stuard — professional golfer
- Tyler Thomas — former Canadian Football League player and current Indoor Football League player
- Brian VanGorder — football coach, defensive coordinator for Auburn, Notre Dame, NFL's Atlanta Falcons
- Rick Wise — Major League Baseball pitcher
- Alfred Worden — NASA astronaut and one of 24 people to have travelled to the Moon
- Wendy Wyland — diver, Olympic bronze medalist
- William Double — Golfer, PGA Tour

== Sister cities ==
- Varel, Germany
- Carrickfergus, Northern Ireland, United Kingdom
