= COVID-19 pandemic in Michigan =

Ongoing COVID-19 viral pandemic in Michigan, United States

- Disease: COVID-19
- Pathogen: SARS-CoV-2
- Location: Michigan, U.S.
- Index case: Wayne County, Oakland County
- Arrival date: March 10, 2020
- Confirmed cases: 2,977,727 (as of December 20, 2022)
- Recovered: 1,421,905 (Note: This statistic is only updated on Mondays. The state defines recovery as "still alive 30 days after onset of illness.")
- Deaths: 40,657 (as of December 20, 2022)

Government website
- www.michigan.gov/coronavirus

The first confirmed cases of COVID-19 in the American state of Michigan were discovered on March 10, 2020, one day before the outbreak of the disease was officially declared a global pandemic by the World Health Organization. As of December 20, 2022, 2,977,727 cases have been identified, causing 40,657 deaths.

The Michigan Department of Health and Human Services made the COVID-19 vaccines available to all residents age 16 years and older on April 5, 2021, in accordance with President Joe Biden's order directing all states to do so by April 19, 2021. As of September 29, 2022, Michigan has administered 16,758,098 doses, with 67.5% of the state's population having received the first dose, 60.6% having received a second dose, and 34.2% having received a third dose.

== Condensed timeline ==
=== March 2020 ===
- March 10: The state's first two cases were confirmed in Metro Detroit, one in a Wayne County resident who had traveled domestically, and one in an Oakland County resident who had traveled internationally. Governor Gretchen Whitmer declared a state of emergency.
- March 11: Several universities and colleges moved to online education plus initiated various extensions, postponements, and alterations to academic schedules.
- March 18: The state's first death was confirmed at Beaumont Health in Wayne County, a Southgate man in his 50s with underlying health conditions. Two more deaths reported: an 81-year old in Detroit and a woman in her 50s with underlying health conditions in Pontiac.
- March 24: Statewide stay-at-home order began, limiting all non-essential travel and discontinuing all non-essential business services and operations.
- March 26: Several cases were reclassified when the state of Michigan began reporting the Michigan Department of Corrections as its own jurisdiction.
- March 31: Michigan ranked third nationally for coronavirus-related deaths, behind New York and New Jersey, with a total of 259 deaths.

=== April 2020 ===
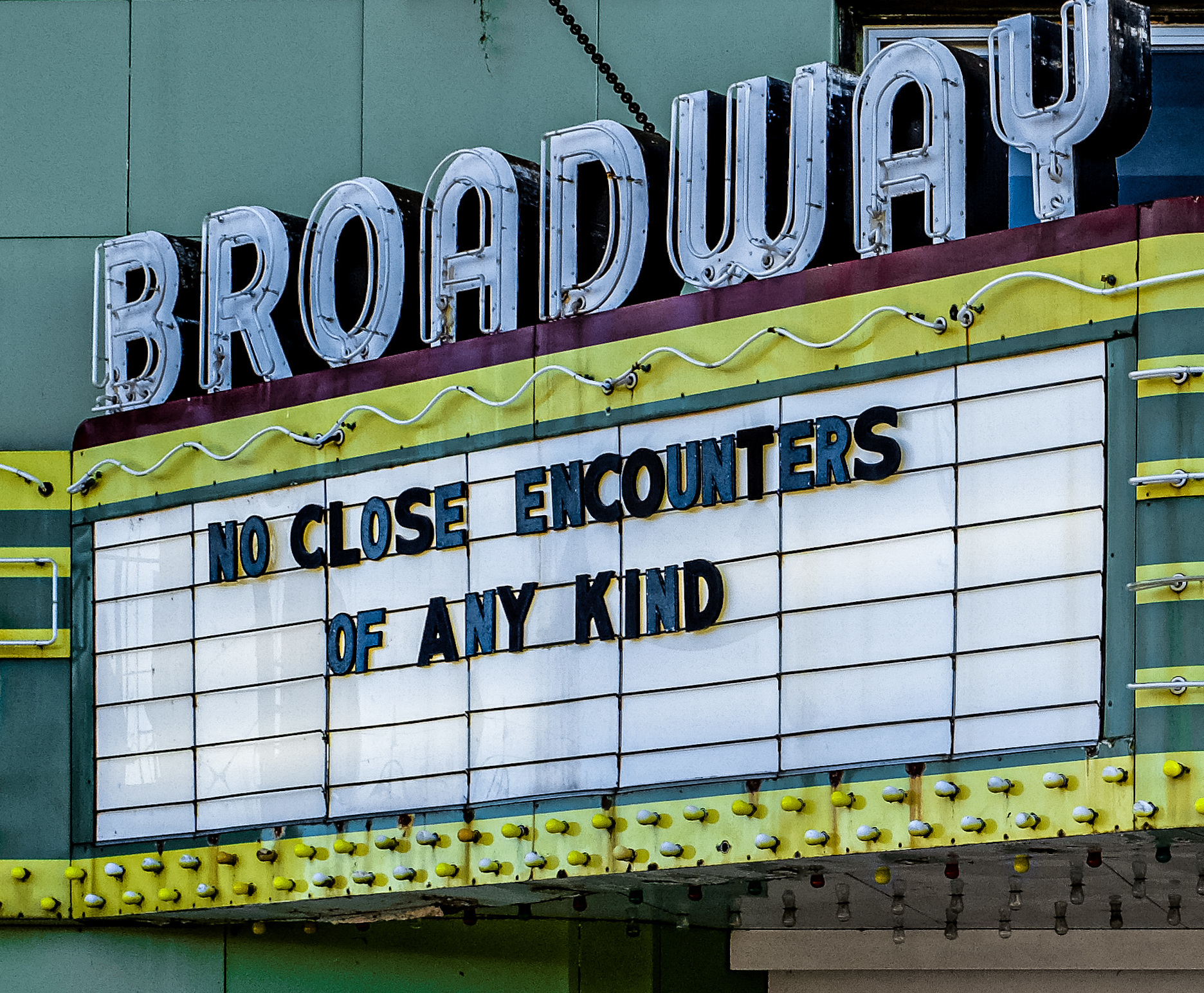
Theater sign in Mount Pleasant.

- April 1: The Michigan Department of Health and Human Services (MDHHS) published it had made a request to the federal Centers for Medicare & Medicaid Services to temporarily waive a number of Medicaid requirements in order to keep Michigan's most vulnerable residents safe during the COVID-19 pandemic.
- April 2: MDHHS issued an Emergency Order requiring compliance with the state's Executive Orders under penalty of civil fines up to $1,000 and referral to licensing agencies for enforcement.
- April 3: The state began disclosing recovery numbers, and confirmed 56 people had recovered from COVID-19.
- April 4: MDHHS issued an Emergency Order requiring funeral homes and doctors to report COVID-19 deaths more quickly as rapid notice can slow spread of the virus.
- April 8: Michigan became the third state to reach more than 20,000 confirmed cases.
- April 9: Governor Whitmer extended the stay-at-home order through April 30 and added several new social distancing restrictions.
- April 24: The stay-at-home order was extended to May 15, with some restrictions lifted and others added.

=== May 2020 ===
- May 1:
  - Governor Whitmer extended the state of emergency until May 28.
  - A security guard was shot dead in Flint after telling a family that one of their members could not enter a Family Dollar because she didn't have a mask on. All four members of the family were charged with various crimes, with a 23-year-old man charged with first degree murder.
- May 7: Governor Whitmer extended the stay-at-home order until May 28. It modified some of the restrictions of previous orders and allowed factories to re-open starting May 11.
- May 22: Governor Whitmer extended the stay-at-home order until June 12 and the state of emergency until June 19.
- May 25: Governor Whitmer opened Northern Michigan for Memorial Day.

=== June 2020 ===
- June 12: The final stay at home order expired.
- June 30: Governor Whitmer released the state's "Return to School Roadmap" containing three proposed plans for re-opening K-12 schools for the upcoming 2020–21 school year.

=== July 2020 ===
- July 5: The state reported no new deaths from COVID-19 for the first time since March 17.
- July 24: The Detroit Tigers began their 2020 season after a four-month delay caused by the pandemic.

=== August 2020 ===
- August 7: Governor Whitmer extended the state of emergency until September 4.
- August 8: The Mid-American Conference, which includes the Central Michigan Chippewas, Eastern Michigan Eagles, and Western Michigan Broncos, canceled its fall 2020 sports seasons. A month and a half later, it reversed its decision on its football season, voting to play a six-game schedule.
- August 11: The Big Ten Conference, which includes the Michigan Wolverines and Michigan State Spartans, postponed its fall 2020 sports seasons. A month later, it announced an eight-game 2020 football season which would start on October 24.
- August 12: The Great Lakes Intercollegiate Athletic Conference, which is made up mostly of schools in Michigan, postponed its fall and winter sports seasons.
- August 13: The state reported 1,121 new cases, the highest since May 14, and surpassed 90,000 total cases.
- August 14: The Michigan High School Athletic Association postponed the football season until spring 2021.
- August 18: Michigan State University moved all classes for the fall 2020 semester to virtual learning.
- August 19: Governor Whitmer signed the Return to Learn package of bills outlining instructional requirements for the 2020–2021 school year.
- August 20: Fourteen school districts reported COVID-19 outbreaks. The state did not say which specific districts or how many people were affected.
- August 28: The state surpassed 100,000 confirmed cases of COVID-19.

=== September 2020 ===
- September 3: Governor Whitmer extended the state of emergency until October 1. She also reopened gyms and pools and allowed organized sports to resume across the state starting September 9, although her Chief Medical Executive and top public health advisor Dr. Joneigh Khaldun simultaneously released guidance advocating against it.
- September 11: The state reported 1,313 new cases, the highest single-day total since April 24.
- September 17: A two-month-old baby died from COVID-19, the youngest known fatality in the state.
- September 29: Governor Whitmer extended the state of emergency until October 27.

=== October 2020 ===
- October 9: Movie theaters, live performance venues, arcades, bingo halls, bowling centers, indoor climbing facilities, trampoline parks and other businesses were allowed to re-open.
- October 10: The amount of total recoveries in the state surpassed 100,000. However, the state also reported over 1,000 new daily cases for the fourth day in a row and the sixth time since the beginning of the month.
- October 15: The state recorded 2,030 new cases, a new single-day record.
- October 17: The state's death toll surpassed 7,000.
- October 22: The state reported 43 new deaths, the highest single-day death toll since May 30.
- October 24: The state recorded 3,338 new cases, a new single-day record.
- October 29: The state recorded 3,675 new cases, a new single-day record.
- October 31: The state recorded 3,792 new cases, a new single-day record.

=== November 2020 ===
- In the first two weeks of the month, Michigan set new records for highest number of new cases in a day seven times. The last during this period was on November 13 when 8,516 new cases were reported. In response, Governor Whitmer announced the MDHHS has ordered the closure of several businesses and public services, including high schools and universities, for three weeks, effective November 18.
- November 16: The state surpassed 8,000 deaths.
- November 20: The state recorded 9,779 new cases, a new single-day record.
- November 21: The state surpassed 300,000 confirmed cases and 150,000 recoveries.
- November 25: A report by the Michigan Department of Health and Human Services said six hospitals in the state were at 100% capacity and another 18 were at 90% or more. Statewide, almost 4,100 people were hospitalized with COVID-19.
- November 28: The state surpassed 9,000 deaths.

=== December 2020 ===
- December 7: After the state surpassed 400,000 confirmed cases of COVID-19, Governor Gretchen Whitmer extended the statewide partial shutdown on businesses (including casinos, movie theaters and group exercise classes at gyms), indoor dining in restaurants, and in-person instruction at high schools, colleges and universities through December 20. In addition, the Michigan House of Representatives announced that they would cancel a voting session scheduled for December 8 after Rudy Giuliani, former New York City mayor and personal lawyer to President Donald Trump, tested positive for COVID-19. Giuliani and several witnesses testified before the state's House Oversight Committee on December 2 on alleged irregularities in the state's 2020 presidential election results. The House later cancelled voting sessions for December 9 and 10 after an aide was diagnosed with COVID-19.
- December 8: The state surpassed 10,000 confirmed deaths from COVID-19. In response, Governor Whitmer ordered flags to fly at half staff for the next 10 days, one day for each 1,000 deaths.
- December 9: Nearly 30 members and staffers of the Michigan House of Representatives tested positive for COVID-19.
- December 10: Whitmer signed an order creating the Protect Michigan Commission within the MDHHS, which was meant to help raise awareness of the safety and effectiveness of an approved COVID-19 vaccine, educate the people of this state, and help protect the health and safety of all Michigan residents.
- December 16: The state surpassed 11,000 deaths from COVID-19, eight days after passing 10,000.
- December 18: The state announced an extension of the shutdown for indoor dining and bars for four weeks, but allowed other indoor entertainment venues like theaters, casinos, bowling alleys and indoor gun ranges to reopen with capacity limits and a ban on concessions. High schools, colleges and universities were allowed to reopen on January 4.
- December 26: The state surpassed 12,000 deaths, 10 days after surpassing 11,000 deaths.
- December 30: The state ended the year with 488,134 confirmed cases and 12,333 confirmed deaths (results were not reported on New Year's Eve).

=== January 2021 ===
- January 4: The state surpassed 500,000 confirmed cases.
- January 7: The state surpassed 13,000 deaths, 12 days after surpassing 12,000.
- January 21: The state surpassed 14,000 confirmed deaths from COVID-19, two weeks after surpassing 13,000.
- January 22: Governor Whitmer announced that starting on February 1, restaurants would be able to re-open, with several restrictions.
- January 31: The state surpassed one million vaccinations.

=== February 2021 ===
- February 9: The state reports 563 new confirmed cases of COVID-19, the lowest amount since September 22.
- February 11: The state surpasses 15,000 confirmed deaths.
- February 12: The state surpasses 500,000 confirmed recoveries from COVID-19.

=== March 2021 ===
- March 2: Governor Whitmer announces a loosening of restrictions on retail stores, gyms, private parties, entertainment venues, sports stadiums, restaurants, and bars, beginning March 5.
- March 10: On the one-year anniversary of the first cases being discovered in Michigan, the state surpasses 600,000 confirmed cases.
- March 15: Governor Whitmer increases the maximum allowed capacity of sports stadiums from 375 people to 1,000, in time for the start of the 2021 Detroit Tigers season.
- March 17: The state reports zero new confirmed deaths for the first time since August 7, 2020.

=== April 2021 ===
- April 3: The state reports 8,413 new cases, the high number since December 7.
- April 5: The state surpasses 700,000 confirmed cases.
- April 16: The state extends their restrictions on gatherings and dining to May 24 amidst a rise of cases. The state also expands their mask mandate to children ages 2–4 years.
- April 20: A report by the research group Covid Act Now finds Michigan is the only state categorized as at a "severe" risk level for a virus outbreak.
- April 21: The state surpasses 800,000 confirmed cases and 17,000 confirmed deaths.
- April 29: The state announces a tiered re-opening plan based on the percentages of vaccinated residents.

=== May 2021 ===
- May 4: The state relaxes several restrictions regarding face mask requirements, especially in outdoor gatherings.
- May 15: Per new CDC guidelines, the state lifts some indoor mask mandates for people who have been fully vaccinated at least two weeks prior to this date.
- May 20: Governor Whitmer announces restrictions on crowd sizes for outdoor events will be lifted on June 1. The 11:00 PM curfew on restaurants and bars were lifted on June 1.
- May 25: The state surpasses 19,000 confirmed deaths from COVID-19.

=== June 2021 ===
- June 17: Governor Whitmer announces face mask requirements and capacity restrictions on indoor events will be lifted on June 22. Masks are still required for nursing homes, prisons, hospitals, schools, funeral directors, and agricultural workers. Usage at businesses is optional.

=== July 2021 ===
- July 1: Governor Whitmer announces a month-long vaccination raffle in which residents can win a total of $5 million in cash (one grand prize of $2 million or one of three prizes of $1 million) and $500,000 total in college scholarships for children ages 12–17 years old (nine prizes of $55,000). The winners while be drawn on August 4.
- July 2: The state announces it will only report statistics on Tuesdays and Fridays as of this date.
- July 29: Blood samples gathered by USDA researchers showed that Michigan's white-tailed deer population demonstrated the highest rate of SARS-CoV-2 antibodies across a multi-state study, with 67% of Michigan deer in the study testing positive for prior exposure to COVID-19; the next highest state of Pennsylvania showed only 44% exposure within its white-tailed deer population.

=== August 2021 ===
- August 2: The state says 33 of its 83 counties reported "substantial or high" transmission rates, up from just 10 rural counties during the final week of July, due to increased community transmission of the Delta variant of COVID-19.
- August 13: The state surpasses 20,000 deaths from COVID-19.

=== September 2021 ===
- September 22: The state surpasses one million confirmed cases of COVID-19.

=== November 2021 ===
During November, COVID-19 hospitalizations in Michigan nearly doubled.

=== December 2021 ===
During the first week of December, COVID-19 hospitalizations in Michigan reached an all-time high.

=== February 2022 ===
On February 4, Michigan surpassed two million total confirmed cases of COVID-19 since the pandemic began.

== Notable cases and clusters ==
=== 2020 ===
Detroit Pistons player Christian Wood was diagnosed with COVID-19 on March 14.

Christian singer Sandi Patty tested positive for the virus on March 18, after having performed a concert at Andrews University in Berrien Springs on March 8. Some individuals attended a VIP experience after the concert and had close contact with the singer. All of the VIP attendees were instructed to self-isolate and monitor symptoms through March 22. Three subsequent cases in Berrien County were linked to the concert.

By March 25, nine Detroit Police Department employees had tested positive for COVID-19, while 280 others had been placed in quarantine. Two deaths were reported within the department on March 24, a 38-year-old civilian dispatcher and a commanding officer within the department who died from complications with the virus. Chief James Craig tested positive for the virus and was under quarantine for over two weeks. As of March 25, six other Detroit city employees had contracted the virus, with numerous others placed under quarantine. The officers and others reportedly contracted the disease at a community breakfast event at Ford Resource and Engagement Center in Detroit on March 6. Seventy-six Detroit police officers and 17 firefighters were infected by March 31.

Eighteen Wayne County Sheriff's Office employees also tested positive for the virus, with the department's first confirmed death on March 25, a 63-year old Commander and 30-year veteran of the department. State representative Isaac Robinson from Detroit died from a suspected COVID-19 infection on March 29 at the age of 44. On April 6, another state representative, Karen Whitsett, also from Detroit, reported she has been also been diagnosed with COVID-19.

On March 27, U.S. Surgeon General Jerome Adams dubbed Metro Detroit, which had a large majority of the cases, a "hot spot". In May, the city of Detroit had 20% of the state's total cases and 25% of the deaths. African Americans made up 31% of the state's total cases and 40% of deaths. A separate study by the Harvard Global Health Institute deemed Macomb County as a hot spot in early August 2020.

Notable clusters were identified within the Michigan Department of Corrections, where 380 inmates and employees have tested positive for the virus within ten of Michigan's twenty-nine prisons by April 10. At least 119 of the cases were linked to the Parnall Correctional Facility in Jackson County. The first employee death was linked to the Detroit Reentry Center. There were two inmate and two employee deaths.

On April 1, the first-ever case of acute necrotizing encephalitis linked to COVID-19 was discovered in the Henry Ford Health System in Detroit.

On April 2, Hurley Medical Center pediatrician Dr. Mona Hanna-Attisha, who helped uncover the Flint water crisis, reported she tested positive for COVID-19.

On April 6, Flint-based United Auto Workers executive Ruben Burks died from COVID-19 at the age of 86. Also on April 6, Nathel Burtley, former superintendent of Flint Community Schools and Grand Rapids Public Schools, died from COVID-19 at the age of 79.

As of April 9, eight employees at the Durand Senior Care and Rehab facility had tested positive for the virus and all residents were quarantined in their rooms. It confirmed eleven cases on April 12. It reported 70 cases, 39 residents and 31 employees, on April 20. On April 22, nearby nursing home The Lodges of Durand reported one staff member and three residents tested positive for COVID-19.

A nursing home in Cedar Springs reported six deaths from COVID-19 on April 9. It had earlier reported 31 residents and five staff members had COVID-19.

Also on April 9, it was reported 872 staffers in the Henry Ford Health System in Metro Detroit had tested positive for COVID-19, the state's largest outbreak thus far.

Kroger and Meijer reported on April 11 that several of their employees in the state had died from COVID-19. Kroger reported four deaths, while Meijer did not give an exact figure.

On April 14, Regency nursing home in Grand Blanc Township reported 16 cases of COVID-19, four of them deaths.

A Flint Police officer died of COVID-19 on April 17. Also on April 17, Maple Woods Manor nursing home in Clio reported 13 of its residents have died from COVID-19.

On April 19, a five-year-old Detroit girl became Michigan's youngest resident to die from COVID-19 at that point.

On April 20, Hurley Medical Center reported one of its veteran public safety officers died of COVID-19.

On April 21, it was reported 60 workers at a JBS Meat Packaging plant in Gun Plain Township tested positive for COVID-19.

On May 11, 25 female residents and four staff members at Wolverine Home Services, a youth treatment facility in Vassar, tested positive for COVID-19.

On May 12, former state politician Morris Hood III, who served in both houses of the legislature, died of COVID-19 at the age of 54.

On June 19, it was reported over 50 workers at Maroa Farms in Coldwater tested positive for COVID-19.

Starting in late June, Harper's Restaurant & Brew Pub in East Lansing was linked to over 180 cases. The Ingham County Health Department asked anyone who visited the bar between June 12–20 to self-quarantine for 14 days. It also issued an emergency order for all restaurants and bars in the county, requiring them to operate at 50% capacity or no more than 75 people, whichever is less.

On June 24, two members of the Detroit Tigers organization (pitcher Daniel Norris and a coach) tested positive for COVID-19. Norris was later cleared to join the Opening Day roster.

On July 5, it was reported 12 cases were linked to the Playhouse Club in Romulus while another was linked to the Checkers restaurant next door.

An Independence Day party in Saline was linked to 43 confirmed cases.

On July 20, a news release from the Catholic website Global Sisters Report announced that 13 nuns who were members of the Felician Sisters of North America had died from complications of the virus in Livonia.

In late July, the Detroit Lions placed eight players on the injury list after they tested positive for COVID-19.

On July 31, State Senator Tom Barrett tested positive for COVID-19.

The Spring Ministries Camp trip that took place from July 12–17 in Gladwin was linked to 53 confirmed cases and 13 suspected cases.

Another campground, Camp Michawana in Hastings, reported five staff members and one visitor have been diagnosed with COVID-19, possibly exposing 250 people. The Barry-Eaton District Health Department advised people who visited the campground after July 24 should self-quarantine at home for 14 days past the last date of their stay at camp and seek testing immediately if symptoms develop.

On August 6, it was reported 53 employees at United Shore, a mortgage lender in Pontiac, had tested positive for COVID-19 since June 29.

On August 25, the Genesee County Health Department said six people contracted COVID-19 at a wedding reception at the Flushing Valley Golf & Country Club on August 15 where 100 people gathered.

On September 17, a two-month-old baby became the youngest known person to die from COVID-19 in the state.

On October 26, it was reported 778 inmates and 137 employees at Marquette Branch Prison had tested positive for COVID-19. Also on October 26, it was reported 24 inmates at the Calhoun County Correctional Facility had tested positive for COVID-19.

On October 27, it was reported that 11 inmates and three employees at the Genesee County Jail had tested positive for COVID-19 and were placed in quarantine.

On October 29, it was reported that 57 cases had been linked to the Liberty Church in Grand Ledge.

On November 7, it was reported that 13 employees at the Sundance Chevrolet car dealership in Grand Ledge had tested positive for COVID-19. The Barry-Eaton District Health Department says that anyone who was at the dealership from October 29 to November 6 should monitor for symptoms and limit contact with others as much as possible and get tested if they begin to experience any symptoms.

On November 9, Michigan State Spartans men's basketball head coach Tom Izzo revealed he had tested positive for COVID-19.

On November 13, two state legislators reportedly test positive: Senator Kim LaSata and Representative Ann Bollin. The day before, Representative Scott VanSingel confirmed he was recovering from the virus.

On November 16, U.S. Representative for Michigan's 7th congressional district Tim Walberg announced he had tested positive for COVID-19.

On December 1, it was announced State Representative John Chirkun had contracted COVID-19.

On December 9, it was reported 55 Flint municipal employees tested positive for COVID-19.

On December 17, Wayne County Sheriff Benny Napoleon died of COVID-19 at the age of 65.

On December 18, former politician Bill Bullard Jr., who served in both chambers of the state legislature and the Oakland County Board of Commissioners, died of complications from COVID-19 and cancer at the age of 77.

On December 23, Majority Leader of the Michigan Senate Mike Shirkey tested positive for COVID-19. He believed he was exposed to the coronavirus on December 19. On December 21, Shirkey attended Lee Chatfield's farewell speech at the Michigan State Capitol.

On December 29, incumbent mayor of Dearborn Heights and former state representative, Daniel S. Paletko, died from complications with COVID-19.

=== 2021 ===
On January 11, the Saginaw Correctional Facility in Tittabawassee Township reported that 728 inmates and 118 staff members had tested positive for COVID-19. On February 16, it was reported 90 cases of the UK variant had been confirmed at another prison, the Bellamy Creek Correctional Facility in Ionia. In total, 62% of Michigan's 40,886 inmates had tested positive for COVID-19 and 138 had died from it, as of March 11, 2021.

On February 26, it was reported that 23 employees of a Whole Foods store in Detroit tested positive for COVID-19.

On March 22, it was reported that 40 positive cases were discovered at Eisenhower High School in Shelby Township, sending 400 students into quarantine and moving all classes to virtual learning until at least April 12, with some classes resuming as late as April 19.

As of June 28, there were 123 active clusters in the state, down 37% from the previous week.

=== Schools, colleges and universities ===
For further info on the pandemic's impact on college and high school sports in Michigan, see the College and High school sections

As of October 19, 2020 at least 348 confirmed cases of COVID-19 had been linked to Central Michigan University students returning to campus on August 21 and 22 for the fall 2020 semester. In response, the Central Michigan District Health Department issued an emergency public health order limiting outdoor gatherings to 25 people in the city of Mount Pleasant and neighboring Union Township.

On November 15, 2020, after several days of record numbers of new cases in the past month, Governor Whitmer ordered high schools, colleges and universities to exclusively use virtual learning for three weeks, starting November 18.

In Big Ten college football, the Michigan-Ohio State game was cancelled on December 9, 2020 due to the high number of infections on the Michigan team. Michigan and Michigan State's games against Maryland were also cancelled due to outbreaks. Several other college conferences' 2020 football seasons were canceled or shortened.

On September 11, 2020, the president of Michigan State University began looking into interim suspensions for students from the university who are not following COVID-19 guidelines, with 24 cases under review. On September 14, the Ingham County Health Department issued a mandatory 14-day quarantine for 30 large student houses in East Lansing. Eleven more student houses in the city were added to the quarantine on September 17, while two houses previously on the list were removed after further investigations. As of September 17, the school was investigating 51 reports of potential violations of emergency orders. On January 30, 2021, after an uptick in cases, MSU issued a partial lockdown for the campus, which lasted until February 13. As of May 24, 4,194 cases had been confirmed.

On October 20, 2020, an emergency stay-at-home order (with several exceptions) was issued for students at the University of Michigan (U of M), the state's second largest university, for two weeks. Washtenaw County had 4,229 confirmed cases on that date, 2,702 of which were connected to students. U of M canceled all undergraduate housing contracts for the winter 2021 semester and encouraged students to stay home and take classes exclusively via virtual learning. Students who chose to remain on campus needed to request permission from the housing department and rooms were limited to one person each. On January 23, 2021, five people with ties to U of M were discovered to be infected with the new UK variant of COVID-19, causing its sports teams to shut down activities for two weeks. By May 17, 2021, the university had 50 active cases.

On February 2, 2021, Lapeer High School reported 18 cases, sending 200 people to quarantine for two weeks.

On February 17, 2021, 23 cases were reported at Lakeville High School in northeastern Genesee County, 15 of which were students who had gone out-of-state. In response, the school conducted all classes virtually and canceled all sporting events and extracurricular activities until February 26.

On March 16, 2021, it was reported that 21 students at Oxford High School were diagnosed with COVID-19 the previous week due to off-campus social gatherings, causing 195 students to enter quarantine until March 22.

As of May 24, 2021 Grand Valley State University (GVSU) had 1,226 confirmed active cases, the state's second largest outbreak. On September 16, GVSU was issued a mandatory 14-day stay-at-home order for students by the Ottawa County Department of Public Health, when its number of confirmed cases surpassed 600.

As of June 21, 2021, 2,063 students and staff had been infected by coronavirus in school-related outbreaks according to the Michigan Department of Health and Human Services. A total of 1,352 people were infected in ongoing outbreaks associated with seven different college communities, most of them (930) at Western Michigan University.

=== Variants ===
==== UK variant ====
On January 16, 2021, the state's first known strain of Lineage B.1.1.7, or the "UK variant", was discovered in a Washtenaw County woman who had traveled from the United Kingdom. Two more cases of it were found there five days later. By the 23rd, six people had been discovered to be infected with the variant, one in Wayne County and five in Washtenaw County who had ties to the University of Michigan, causing its sports teams to shut down activities for two weeks. By the 27th, 14 people in Washtenaw County had tested positive for the variant.

By February 4, 28 people in the state had tested positive for the variant, all of them in either Washtenaw or Wayne counties. On the 7th, Kent County reported its first positive test for the variant, and was the first outside of Metro Detroit. By the next day, 45 total cases of the variant had been found in 10 of Michigan's 83 counties. On February 12, two more cases were confirmed in Detroit. By the 15th, 67 cases of the variant have been confirmed across 11 counties, 39 of them in Washtenaw County. On the 16th, 90 cases of the variant were confirmed at the Bellamy Creek Correctional Facility in Ionia. The next day, Genesee County reported its first variant case in a person who had recently visited a Washtenaw County hospital. By the 19th, Michigan had 10% of the country's cases of the UK variant. On March 11, six cases of the variant were reported in Genesee County.

==== Later variants ====
On March 8, the state reported their first case of the 501.V2 variant that originated in South Africa in a child from Jackson County.

On March 31, the state reported their first case of the Lineage P.1 variant, which originated in Brazil, in a person from Bay County. Another case of Lineage P.1 was identified in Shiawassee County on the same date. A third case of Lineage P.1 was reported in Genesee County on April 7. The person was diagnosed with the variant on March 23.

By April 1, The state reported six cases of the "California variants" of COVID-19: three of the B 1.427 variant in Jackson and Washtenaw Counties; and three of the B 1.429 variant, one each in Oakland, Livingston, and Washtenaw counties.

On April 30, it was reported that the first case of Lineage B.1.617.2, first discovered in India, was confirmed in a person from Clinton County.

On June 26, it was reported that the first case of Lineage B.1.617 Delta variant was reported in a fully vaccinated Ottawa County resident.

As of December 24, Michigan had reported 13 confirmed cases of the Omicron variant in six counties.

== Government response ==
=== Emergency response ===
==== 2020 ====
On February 3, 2020, the Michigan Department of Health and Human Services (MDHHS) activated its Community Health Emergency Coordination Center to support local and state response to the coronavirus. On February 28, the State Emergency Operations Center was activated by Governor Gretchen Whitmer to assist with coordination. On March 3, the Governor created four COVID-19 Task Forces: State Operations, Health and Human Services, Education, and Economy/Workforce. A state of emergency at the state level was declared by the Governor on March 10. It was renewed several times, the latest expiration date being October 27, 2020.

On March 13, The Michigan Department of Corrections banned visitors to prisons, along with prohibiting any volunteers from the prison. Staff at prisons would be required to have their temperature tested and be proven to be under 100.4 °F (38.0 °C), along with other measures.

Michigan Secretary of State Jocelyn Benson issued an order starting March 16 to limit all Michigan Secretary of State branch offices to appointment-only instead of walk-ins. The only services provided by the offices would be for those applying for new licenses and IDs, for title transfers, and for testing for a license. All branches werel no longer open on Saturdays, with most weekday hours expanding. For those renewing their licenses, the proof of car insurance requirement was waived, along with late fees associated with the change.

On March 13, Whitmer banned all gatherings of 250 or more people in a single space, with limited exceptions. The ban was lowered to 50 people on March 16 per a CDC recommendation, and bars, restaurants, entertainment venues, and other businesses to partially close for two weeks.

On March 20, Whitmer signed an executive order banning landlords from filing eviction requests against tenants until April 17, which she said "relieves courts from certain statutory restrictions to enable them to stay eviction-related proceedings until after the COVID-19 emergency has passed". On April 15, Whitmer ordered nursing homes to transfer coronavirus patients to separate units or special facilities and banned evictions from nursing homes. The order was in effect until May 13. On June 11, Whitmer extended the freeze on residential evictions for non-payment of rent to June 30.

On March 24, a statewide stay-at-home order was issued, limiting all non-essential travel and discontinuing all non-essential business services and operations. It was originally set to expire on April 13, but was extended until April 30 with several new social distancing restrictions. Failure to abide by the order was punishable with a $1,000 fine or 90 days in jail. The order was later extended to May 15, with some restrictions lifted and others added, such as mandatory face-covering usage in public buildings and businesses. The order was later extended again until May 28 and added modifications of the restrictions from previous orders. In June, Whitmer extended the face mask requirement until July 15. On July 10, she extended the requirement and added a provision in which businesses can be fined $500 for not enforcing it and customers may be refused service for failing to wear one.

Several of the restrictions on businesses and medical facilities were lifted in late May. On June 1, Whitmer announced that the stay-at-home order was partially lifted and that Michigan was in stage four of its six-stage re-opening plan. Outdoor crowds of up to 100 people were allowed starting June 1. Restaurants and bars began re-opening for indoor dining services starting June 8, and other restrictions on businesses were loosened. Hair salons, barbershops, and similar businesses were allowed to reopen on June 15. Starting July 31, indoor gatherings were limited to 10 people and bars would be closed for indoor service and outdoor gatherings to 100. On August 14, Governor Whitmer announced four million masks would be distributed to vulnerable populations in Michigan. Movie theaters and other entertainment venues were allowed to re-open on October 9.

On October 29, the MDHHS issued a new mask mandate and crowd size limitations for public places, businesses, private gatherings, and restaurants.

On November 15, after several days of record highs in new cases, Governor Whitmer announced the MDHHS had ordered the closure of several businesses and services for three weeks, effective November 18. High schools and universities were closed to in-person learning, and organized sports (except for professional) are on hiatus. Businesses ordered to close included live theaters, movie theaters, stadiums, arenas, bowling centers, ice skating rinks, indoor water parks, bingo halls, casinos, arcades, and group fitness classes.

On December 18, the state announced an extension of the shutdown for indoor dining and bars for four weeks, but allowed other indoor entertainment venues like theaters, casinos, bowling alleys and indoor gun ranges to reopen with capacity limits, and a ban on concessions. All schools were allowed to reopen on January 4.

==== 2021 ====
On February 8, 2021, the Federal Emergency Management Agency gave Michigan DHHS $8,375,955 for COVID-19 vaccination distribution efforts.

Facing a COVID-19 surge in April, Whitmer hoped to avoid more mandatory shutdowns and asked Michigan residents on April 9 to take more "personal responsibility." She asked White House to send more vaccine doses. which was denied, in large part because the protection provided by vaccines activates only after several weeks, while the need to prevent new infections was immediate. On April 12, CDC Director Dr. Rochelle Walensky argued that asking for voluntary quarantine would not be enough. She said that Michigan needed "to really close things down, to go back to our basics, to go back to where we were last spring, last summer, and to shut things down."

In May 2021, it was determined that Governor Whitmer did not follow Michigan Department of Health and Human Services (MDHHS) self-quarantine rules upon her March trip to Florida.

=== Education ===
As of March 11, 2020, all campuses of the Lake Superior State University, University of Michigan, Western Michigan University, Wayne State University, Michigan Technological University, Northern Michigan University, Michigan State University, Grand Valley State University, Saginaw Valley State University, Central Michigan University, and all community colleges, had various restrictions on students and faculty in response to the virus.

Executive Order 2020-05 included the closure of all K–12 school buildings from March 16 through April 5. On April 2, the order was updated to suspend the remainder of the 2019–20 school year unless crisis restrictions are otherwise lifted. The order included guidelines for the development and distribution of home learning materials. Additionally, all high school seniors would be given the opportunity to graduate on their previously anticipated date.

On March 13, the Michigan Department of Education was granted a federal waiver by the United States Department of Agriculture. The waiver allowed for students who receive food from the Unanticipated School Closure SFSP to not be mandated to receive the food in a group setting. The Michigan Career and Technical Institute suspended all programs until April 5.

On June 30, Governor Whitmer released the state's "Return to School Roadmap" containing three proposed plans for re-opening K-12 schools for the upcoming 2020–21 school year.

On August 18, Michigan State University moved all classes for the fall 2020 semester to virtual learning.

On August 19, it was announced the state's public schools, especially low-income school districts, were receiving a combined $65 million for virtual learning technology.

On August 24, Eastern Michigan University postponed its date for students to move onto campus from August 27 to September 17. It began its fall semester online on August 31, but transitioedn the small number of classes that were scheduled to be in-person to a near fully online schedule through September 20.

In December 2020, two veterinary students appeared before the MSU Board of Trustees, on behalf of the graduating classes of 2023 and 2024, to request a tuition rebate for months of online instruction after originally expecting a mix of in-person and online courses. MSU President Samuel L. Stanley Jr. commented that a refund wouldn't be practical due to the university's fixed costs. In January 2021, MSU instituted a lockdown for the minority of students who had returned to campus, asking all in-person students to primarily stay in their residences for two weeks, citing a rapid increase in the university's COVID-19 positivity rate.

In early February 2021, senior nursing students in the Baker College system began to directly administer vaccines to patients at sites throughout Michigan, under the supervision of nursing faculty.

The University of Michigan (Ann Arbor campus) required students to prove they've been fully vaccinated by July 15 to live in dorms in fall 2021 and subsequent semesters. Michigan State University subsequently decided to require COVID-19 vaccination and masking for all new and returning students by August 31, citing new CDC data regarding the contagiousness of the Delta variant.

=== Businesses ===
==== 2020 ====
On March 10, Attorney General Dana Nessel set up a hotline to report businesses price gouging goods such as toilet paper, meat, milk, bread, bottled water, face masks, hand sanitizers, and cleaning supplies. Sellers faced fines if their asking price was at least 20% higher than it was on March 9, after an executive order from Governor Whitmer banned the practice, until April 16. On March 19, Nessel sent a cease and desist letter to Menards after her investigators found evidence of price hikes, sometimes doubling the retail cost, on high-demand bleach and 3M face masks. In other instances, tipsters reported seeing face masks that cost $10 each, cases of water for $35, and bottles of hand sanitizer for $60. Whitmer issued a second order on March 20 which "focuses enforcement resources on the cases most pertinent to the emergency by clarifying which price increases constitute price gouging." As of April 14, 3,541 complaints had been received.

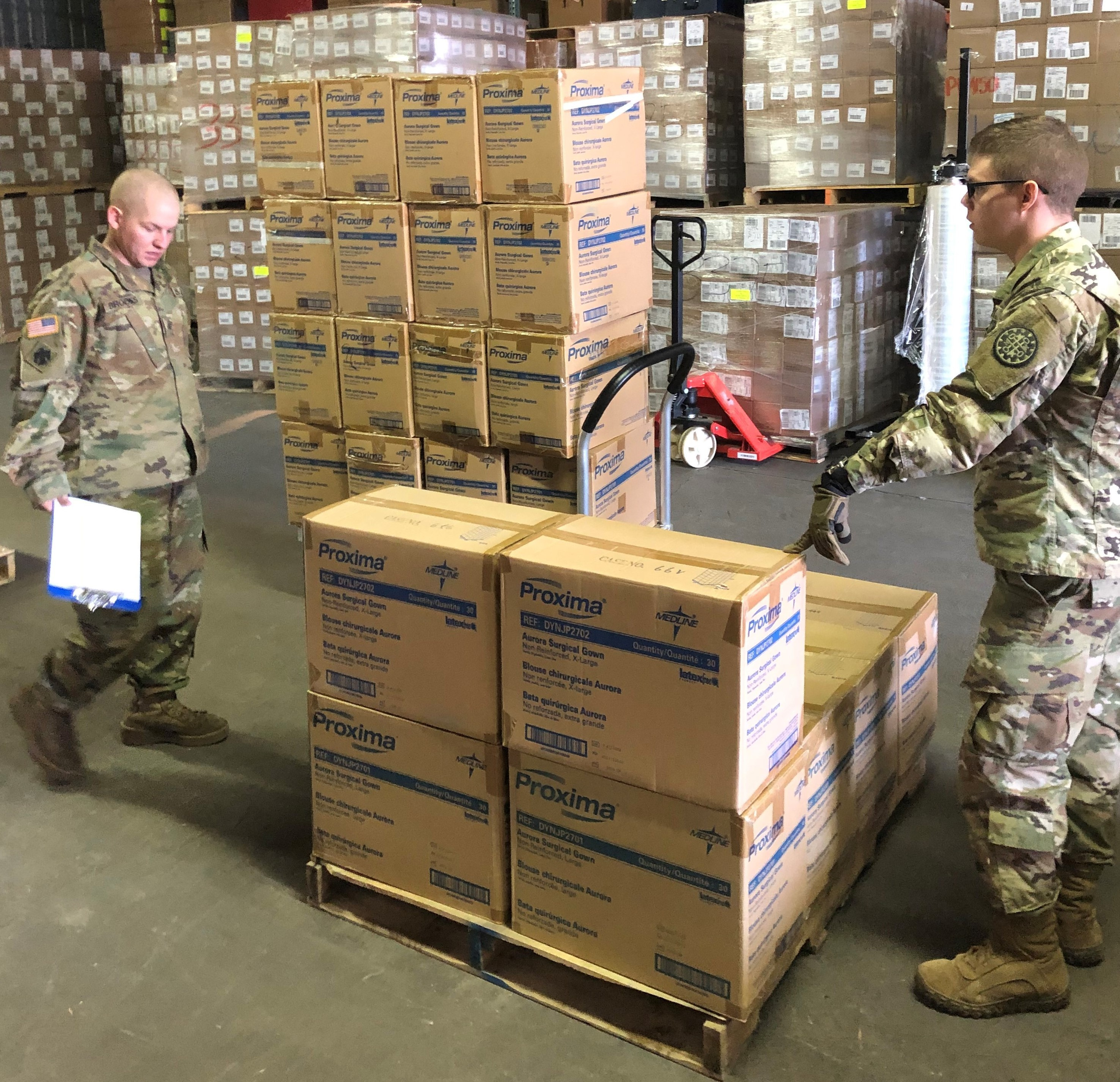
Members of the Michigan Army National Guard loading medical supplies

On March 20, Whitmer signed an executive order for medical and dental facilities to postpone any "non-essential" procedures, such as plastic surgery and teeth whitening, beginning March 20 through the time the State of Emergency is lifted. On March 21, Whitmer issued an executive order to close facilities that provide non-essential personal care services (such as hair and nail salons, tanning salons, and tattoo parlors) until April 13. Whitmer also signed an executive order on March 21 allowing gatherings of 10 people or less at retail stores by appointment only. Some malls opened as early as March 28 and some automobile showrooms reopened after the executive order was made. On March 30, Governor Whitmer signed an executive order banning non-essential veterinary visits.

On April 16, Whitmer joined the governors of Ohio, Wisconsin, Minnesota, Illinois, Indiana, and Kentucky to coordinate a plan to reopen the Midwest regional economy. On April 17, Governor Whitmer outlined a plan to re-open the state's economy starting May 1.

On April 27, Whitmer signed an executive order placing several new regulations on restaurant and grocery stores and their employees.

The next stay-at-home order modified some of the restrictions from previous orders and allowed manufacturing to restart on May 11. On May 18, Whitmer announced bars and restaurant dining rooms in the Northern Lower Peninsula and the Upper Peninsula would be allowed to open on May 22. She also issued two executive orders, one prohibiting factories from giving tours and another requiring people to cover their faces in indoor public spaces. The former requirement was waived to allow Trump to visit a Ford manufacturing plant in Ypsilanti on May 21, during which he flouted the rule.

Tribal casinos planned to reopen on May 29.

On October 22, Whitmer signed several bills that protect workers from the spread of coronavirus on the job and protect businesses from lawsuits related to people contracting COVID-19 if they are following all prevention mandates.

==== 2021 ====
On February 5, it was reported 20 business across the state were fined for COVID-19 violations. Another 16 businesses were charged on February 19. With the latest batch of violations, the state's Attorney General had charged over 100 separate businesses.

On April 9, the Michigan Occupational Safety and Health Administration announced 12 more businesses were fined for violations. On April 19, it was reported 25 more businesses were cited, including Blue Cross Blue Shield of Michigan which required union employees to work from the office, but allowed nonunion employees doing similar jobs to work from home.

=== Economic relief ===
==== 2020 ====
On March 17, the Michigan Legislature approved $125 million to fight the pandemic, with $50 million going towards the Department of Health and Human Services and another $40 million towards other state agencies for ongoing coronavirus response needs. Another $35 million was set in reserve in case more funding becomes necessary in the future. On March 18, Governor Whitmer asked the Michigan Army National Guard to "assist the Michigan Department of Health and Human Services with assembling and loading critical personal protective equipment, such as gloves, gowns, and face shields." In response to widespread rumors that were circulating regarding the National Guard's presence in the state, Whitmer reaffirmed on March 20 that there were no active plans to implement martial law, although she did indicate that state officials were monitoring the effectiveness of lockdown protocols in other states, should they become necessary. On March 30, the legislature allocated an additional $150 million to purchase supplies to fight the pandemic. Trump approved Governor Whitmer's disaster declaration on March 28. Michigan received $2 billion from the Coronavirus Aid, Relief, and Economic Security Act (CARES Act) signed into law on March 27. On August 5, it was announced small businesses in Michigan would receive a combined total of $5.7 million from the CARES Act.

==== 2021 ====
Michigan received $65 billion from the American Rescue Plan Act of 2021, signed into law by President Joe Biden on March 11, 2021. A total of $622 million of federal money for rental assistance became available to eligible Michigan residents starting the third week of March 2021. Some of it, $282 million, was distributed immediately, and the other $340 million was appropriated by the state legislature at a later date.

== Testing ==
=== 2020 ===
During the week of March 16, 2020, Michigan Medicine started in-house testing for COVID-19, with the capabilities to deliver same-day results. This allowed the hospital to bypass the state's testing system, which was previously the sole provider of testing for the virus. The same week, the health system also launched drive-thru testing services for Michigan Medicine patients at West Ann Arbor Health Center, Brighton Health Center, and Canton Health Center.

Similarly, Beaumont Health and Henry Ford Health System in Metro Detroit also developed in-house testing methods in an effort to increase overall testing capacity within the state. On March 27, a regional drive-up testing center opened in Detroit, at the vacant State Fairgrounds site, which was able to test up to 400 residents a day. The state restructured reporting procedures and began incorporating private test results in official government case tallies on March 19.

Starting April 13, 2020, new testing sites opened in Atlanta, Bad Axe, Bay City, Battle Creek, Benton Harbor, Detroit, Flint, Jackson, Kalamazoo, and Traverse City.

On April 15, Hurley Medical Center in Flint opened a mobile testing clinic at Atwood Stadium, with capacity for at least 250 people per day. Testing was provided to those with orders from a doctor and was not open to the general public. Similar drive-thru testing facilities opened in Atlanta, Bad Axe, Battle Creek, Bay City, Benton Harbor, Dearborn, Grand Rapids, Jackson, Kalamazoo, Lansing, Saginaw, and Traverse City.

The state health department released case counts and death tolls daily and updated recovered cases weekly. Reviews of the outcomes of reported COVID cases led to the discovery of unrecorded deaths on multiple occasions. These deaths were added to the daily toll when discovered, with the result that daily reported deaths did not always indicate the current state of the epidemic. Recovery from the disease was defined simply as surviving 30 days after first symptoms, with no review of actual health or hospitalization status. Starting May 29, families could get tested together in Kalamazoo.

== Economic impact ==
=== Aviation ===
Michigan airports received a combined $256 million in federal aid to help ease economic hardship from the coronavirus crisis, funded by the CARES Act.

Starting March 13, 2020, Delta Air Lines, which has a major hub at Detroit Metropolitan Airport, said it would cancel all flights to Europe for 30 days, decreasing flights by 40% and grounding 300 planes. Delta had previously indicated it would reduce international flights by 20–25% and domestic flights by 10–15%. On April 28, Delta announced it was suspending flights to and from Flint, Lansing, and Kalamazoo and several other small hub airports across the country after losing $534 million in the first quarter of 2020 due to the pandemic. American Airlines ended service to 15 small airports, including Kalamazoo, starting October 7.

=== Grocery stores ===
Starting on March 15, 2020, several grocery chains with stores in Michigan, including Kroger, Meijer, and Walmart, began reducing their business hours for cleaning and restocking in response to the pandemic. Similarly, Michigan-based Meijer reported a plan to hire 40–50 new seasonal employees per store to help meet public demand during the outbreak. Kroger announced that, starting the morning of March 23, all of its Michigan stores would be dedicating the first hour of business on Mondays, Wednesdays, and Fridays to seniors, expectant mothers, first responders, and those with compromised immune systems. The following week, Kroger announced it would hire up to 2,000 people in Michigan in response to the pandemic.

=== Automotive manufacturing ===
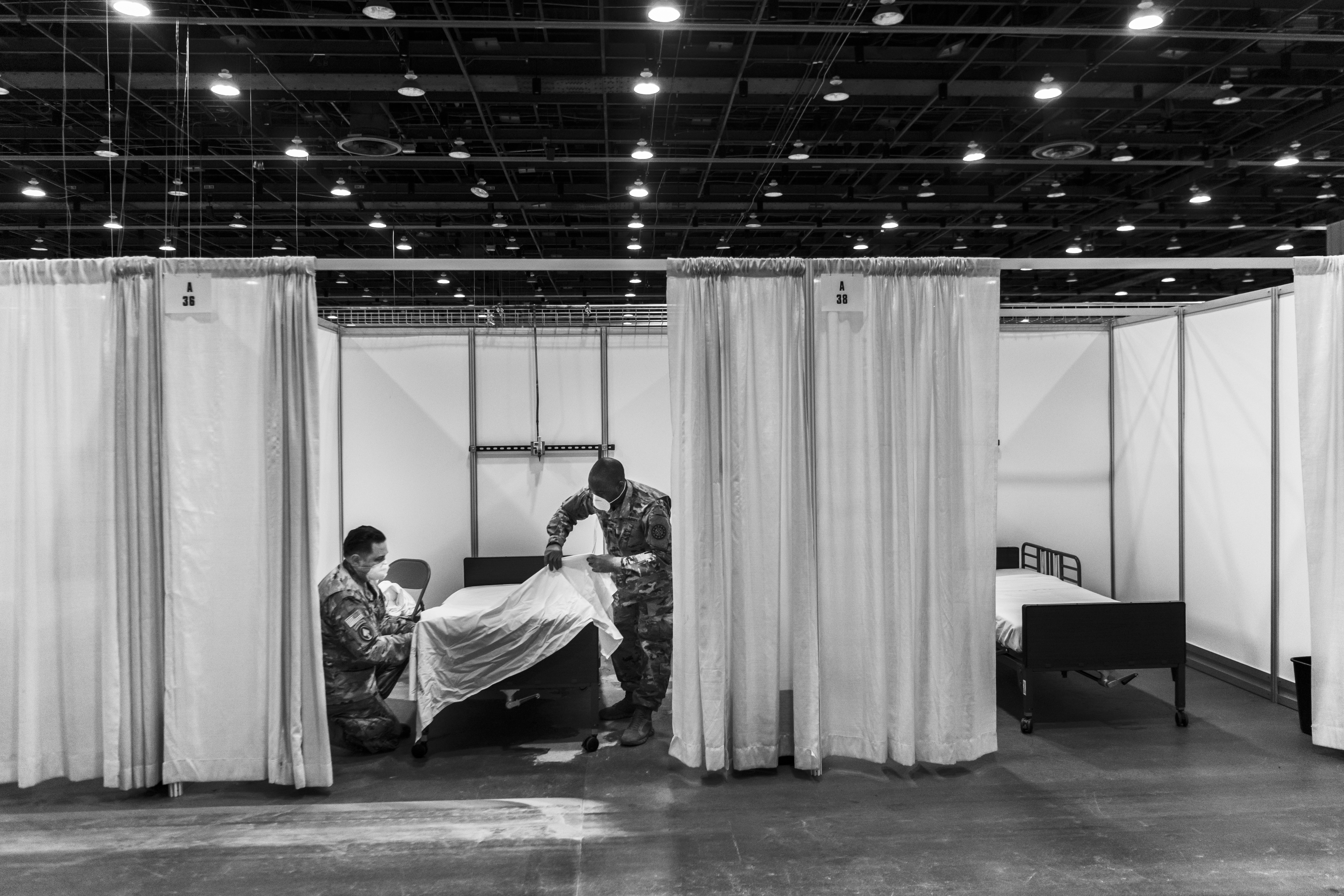
Temporary hospital in the TCF Center in Detroit.

The 2020 North American International Auto Show in Detroit was canceled on March 29, due to the use of its venue TCF Center as a FEMA facility.

Michigan-based automotive manufacturers General Motors, Ford, and Fiat Chrysler announced plans to gradually shut down plants starting March 19 with all plants closed by the end of the month.

On March 30, Ford announced it will convert its Rawsonville Components Plant in Ypsilanti to produce GE/Airon Corporation Model A-E ventilators. It says it will produce 50,000 ventilators in the next 100 days.

On April 1, General Motors announced it will produce 30,000 V+Pro critical care ventilators for the national stockpile.

=== Restaurants and bars ===
==== 2020 ====
On the morning of March 16, Governor Whitmer announced a temporary order to close all bars and restaurants in the state to sit-down service, effective at 3 pm the same evening until March 30. Carry-out and delivery options were excluded from the order, although restaurants were urged to limit in-building carry-out services to five customers at a time. The order also included fitness centers, theaters, casinos, and other venues that encourage large assemblages of patrons, with several exceptions, such as office buildings. This order is expected to have significant economic impacts on businesses, and it prompted the Michigan Restaurant and Lodging Association to call for Whitmer to submit paperwork to qualify Michigan for the U.S. Small Business Administration Economic Injury Disaster Loan program. The order also expands unemployment benefits to public health workers who become ill, people who need to take time off to care for children, and others, until April 14.

Domino's Pizza, which is centered in the state, anticipated hiring up to 10,000 people to help meet increased demand for food delivery services due to the pandemic, while Jet's Pizza also prepared to hire "hundreds" of additional delivery drivers for the same reason.

On June 8, Lansing restaurants reopened for dine-in service for the first time since mid-May.

On September 21, it was announced three bars in West Michigan lost their liquor licenses temporarily after they allegedly failed to enforce coronavirus mandates.

==== 2021 ====
On January 22, 2021, Governor Whitmer announced that starting on February 1, restaurants may re-open at 25% capacity with up to 100 people, tables had to be six feet apart with no more than six people per table, and bars and restaurants had to close by 10 p.m. Contact information also had to be collected from people for contact tracing purposes.

Restaurants, bars and retail stores were allowed to operate at 50% capacity starting March 5, 2021.

=== Unemployment and economic relief ===
On March 19, the Michigan Strategic Fund unanimously voted to approve a $20 million economic relief program meant to help struggling small businesses affected by the pandemic. The Michigan Unemployment Insurance Agency (UIA) had processed over 1.7 million applications as of May 13, with 1.375 million people receiving benefits. The state has paid $5.62 billion in benefits since the state of emergency was declared two months prior. By June 19, UIA disbursed $11.4 billion to two million people since the coronavirus pandemic reached the state. On August 21, the Federal Emergency Management Administration approved UIA's application for funding that would provide an additional $300 per week payment to Michigan residents receiving unemployment benefits. On October 14, the federal government approved unemployment benefits for 20 more weeks, with up to 59 weeks of benefits for some workers. On October 20, Governor Whitmer signed a bill approving six more weeks of state unemployment aid.

== Impact on sports ==
=== Professional ===
==== Baseball ====
On March 12, Major League Baseball cancelled the remainder of spring training. Four days later, they announced that the season would be postponed indefinitely, after the recommendations from the CDC to restrict events of more than 50 people for the next eight weeks, which affected Michigan's team, the Detroit Tigers. On June 24, two members of the Detroit Tigers organization (later identified as pitcher Daniel Norris and a coach) tested positive for COVID-19. Norris was later cleared to join the Opening Day roster.

On June 25, Governor Whitmer signed an executive order which allows professional sports to resume in the state. Two days before, MLB Commissioner Rob Manfred unilaterally implemented a 60-game season. Players reported to training camps at their regular season home stadiums on July 1 in order to resume spring training, which included inter-squad games only, and prepare for a July 23 or 24 Opening Day (July 24 for the Tigers). In an effort to slow the spread of the virus, teams only played their own division and the opposite league's corresponding geographical division, e.g. the Tigers only played the American League Central (40 games total) and National League Central (20 games total). Games were played behind closed doors, with artificial crowd noise played over loudspeakers.

The Tigers' August 3–6 series against the St. Louis Cardinals was postponed several times after 17 of the latter's members tested positive for COVID-19, with two of the games later cancelled outright.

On March 15, 2021, Governor Whitmer increased the maximum allowed capacity of sports stadiums from 375 people to 1,000, in time for the start of the 2021 Detroit Tigers season. On June 8, Comerica Park was allowed to return to operating at full seating capacity after April and May games this season were limited to 8,000 fans.

==== Basketball ====
Also on March 12, the National Basketball Association announced the season would be suspended for 30 days, which affected the Detroit Pistons.

The Pistons' season officially ended on June 5 when they failed to make the cut for a 22-team restart.

In their 2020–21 season, the Pistons' game against the Denver Nuggets on February 1 was postponed due to a positive test on a Detroit player, as well as the February 16 game against the San Antonio Spurs due to an outbreak on the latter team.

==== Hockey ====
In the National Hockey League, the season was suspended for an indefinite amount of time starting March 12, which affected the Detroit Red Wings.

The Red Wings' season officially ended on May 27 when they failed to make a 24-team playoff tournament. They were the only team to be eliminated prior to the suspension of the season.

The NHL's shortened 2020–21 season began on January 13. The regular season ran for 56 games per team, ending on May 8.

==== Football ====
On July 27, National Football League preseason games, which usually take place in August, were cancelled by NFL Commissioner Roger Goodell due to the COVID-19 pandemic, affecting the Detroit Lions.

Most games in the 2020 season were played behind closed doors, with crowds at some stadiums limited to friends and families of the players, coaches, and staff members.

Several members of the Lions coaching staff, including interim head coach Darrell Bevell, sat out the December 26 game against the Tampa Bay Buccaneers due to an outbreak.

==== Golf ====
Executive Order 2020–42, signed April 9, closed golf courses in the state. On April 26, golf courses were allowed to re-open, provided golfers adhere to social distancing guidelines, and stay at least six feet away from people who do not live in their home. Golf carts will not be allowed.

On May 8, golf carts were allowed back on the Michigan golf courses.

The FireKeepers Casino Hotel Championship, an LPGA Symetra Tour event, is one of the first pro sports events returning to Michigan, scheduled for July 24–26 at the Battle Creek Country Club.

The PGA Tour Champions's The Ally Challenge was played at Warwick Hills Golf and Country Club in Grand Blanc Township from July 27–August 2, 2020.

The GAM Junior Invitational was played at Forest Akers West in East Lansing at Michigan State University from September 17–18, 2022.

==== Motorsports ====
On April 6, IndyCar was forced to cancel the Duel in Detroit at Belle Isle Park which were originally scheduled to be first two races of the season. The NASCAR Cup Series postponed the 2020 FireKeepers Casino 400 at Michigan International Speedway from June 5–7 to August 8. The NASCAR Xfinity Series lost their Michigan date for 2020.

=== College ===
The NCAA also canceled all of its remaining winter tournaments for the 2019–2020 academic year, including the 2020 NCAA Division I Men's Ice Hockey Tournament—whose national semi-finals and championship were scheduled to be hosted by Detroit. All spring 2020 seasons were canceled as well.

On June 1, Governor Whitmer signed an executive order that allows college teams to begin workouts and practice sessions for fall 2020 sports seasons. It allows "outdoor fitness classes, athletic practices, training sessions or games, provided that coaches, spectators and participants not from the same household maintain six feet of distance from one another at all times".

On August 8, the Mid-American Conference (MAC), which includes the Central Michigan Chippewas, Eastern Michigan Eagles, and Western Michigan Broncos, canceled all of its fall 2020 sports seasons. On September 25, the MAC reversed its previous decision on its 2020 football season, voting to play a six–game schedule which started on November 4.

On August 11, the Big Ten Conference, which includes the Michigan Wolverines and Michigan State Spartans, postponed their fall 2020 sports seasons. On September 16, however, it was announced the 2020 football season would start on October 24 with an eight-game schedule.

On August 12, the Great Lakes Intercollegiate Athletic Conference, which is made up mostly of schools in Michigan, postponed its fall 2020 and winter 2021 sports seasons.

In the fall of 2020, the pandemic caused both the Michigan Wolverines football and Michigan State Spartans football teams to cancel their games against the Maryland Terrapins football team due to COVID-19 outbreaks. The Michigan football team's game against their arch-rival, the Ohio State Buckeyes, as well as their game against the Iowa Hawkeyes, were also canceled after an increasing number of Michigan players and staff members became infected.

On January 23, 2021, the University of Michigan (U of M) shut down all sports for two weeks after the new more infectious UK variant of COVID-19 was discovered in five individuals with ties to the school. As of April 23, 2021, 342 U of M student-athletes and 59 coaches and staff members have tested positive for COVID-19.

=== High school ===
At the high school level, the Michigan High School Athletic Association canceled the remainder of the winter 2019–20 seasons and all of the spring 2020 seasons on April 3, 2020.

On July 17, MHSAA announced all fall sports will resume as scheduled for the 2020–21 school year with practices starting August 10 for football and August 12 for other sports. However, on July 30, they announced all preseason scrimmages would be canceled and medium and high-risk sports (soccer, volleyball and football) could start practice but a final decision on whether games would be allowed might not be made until August 20. The MHSAA postponed the football season until spring 2021. On August 20, the MHSAA announced it will be allowing soccer, volleyball and swimming to start fall competition in Michigan's region 6 and 8 in Northern Michigan and the Upper Peninsula. Regions 1-5 and 7 are still pending due to the phases they are in according to the Governor's executive orders on the pandemic. Girls' golf, boys' tennis and cross country in both peninsulas are able to start immediately because they are not contact sports. On September 3, the MHSAA approved the return of all fall 2020 sports.

On November 15, Governor Whitmer announced the MDHHS has ordered all high school sports to suspend activities for three weeks, effective November 18.

== Critical responses ==
=== Protests ===
On April 15, a convoy of thousands of motorists drove from all over the state to protest the extension of Governor Gretchen Whitmer's stay-at-home order. The protest, known as Operation Gridlock, involved clogging the streets surrounding on near the Michigan State Capitol, including the Capitol Loop, with their vehicles, drawing national attention. The protest was organized by the Michigan Conservative Coalition, a group with ties to the DeVos family, through Facebook. The Michigan Freedom Fund supported the rally by as an event co-host, spending an estimated $250 to promote the event. The organizers urged participants to practice social distancing, and not leave their vehicles during the protest. Lt. Darren Green of the Michigan State Police estimated several thousand cars were part of the demonstration, with 100 to 150 people congregating on the Capitol lawn. Neither the Michigan State Police nor the Lansing Police Department reported any arrests. Multiple services were disrupted as a result of Operation Gridlock, such as the Capital Area Transportation Authority (CATA) temporarily suspending their downtown route. Governor Whitmer said the protest was legal per the First Amendment's right to freedom of assembly, and understood the protesters' anger, but warned them they were endangering their health by not following social distancing guidelines. President Donald Trump supported the protest on April 17 with an all-caps tweet saying "Liberate Michigan".

On April 30, a second protest occurred when hundreds of protesters, many carrying firearms, gathered at the Michigan Capitol. Many protesters were able to enter the building. The demonstration was organized by conservative group Michigan United for Liberty. Governor Whitmer said on April 30 that she found elements of the protest 'disturbing.' Also, in an appearance May 3 on CNN's State of the Union, the governor said the Confederate flags, nooses and Nazi signs displayed were 'outrageous' and racist, with some depicting her as Adolf Hitler. On May 14, more armed protesters from Michigan United for Liberty gathered outside the Michigan State Capitol. The organization's Facebook group was deleted over death threats against Governor Whitmer and a fight broke out over a doll tied to a noose carried by a man who also had an axe at the protest. The Michigan Legislature closed its scheduled session to avoid the possibility of another armed confrontation inside the chamber.

On May 20, the Michigan Conservative Coalition held "Operation Haircut" on the lawn of the Capitol Building, in which barbers gave free haircuts, in support of an Owosso barber who was forced to shut down after continuing to operate until the previous week, violating the executive order closing non-essential businesses that included barbershops and beauty salons resulting in the state suspending his license. Several of the barbers at the demonstration were issued $1,000 citations by the Michigan State Police for disorderly conduct. A week later on May 27, the group from Operation Haircut delivered a letter to the Governor with a layout of safe practices to reopen. The charges against the Owosso barber were eventually dismissed. The charges against the other barbers arrested during the Operation Haircut demonstration were dismissed on February 8, 2021.

A peaceful demonstration of prayers organized by the religious non-profit Transformation Michigan was performed on the Capitol lawn on May 28. A peaceful protest called "Let MI People Go" by the religious group Stand Up Michigan took place on the Capitol lawn on October 8.

On December 15, a protest took place near the home of Robert Gordon, the director of the Michigan Department of Health and Human Services, to oppose the new restrictions imposed by the state.

=== Gretchen Whitmer kidnapping plot ===
During the summer and fall of 2020, Governor Whitmer was targeted with an elaborate kidnapping plot. The plot was revealed when the Federal Bureau of Investigation thwarted it. In October 2020, fourteen members of a right-wing militia group called the Wolverine Watchmen were charged with several federal and state crimes. One of the suspects cited Whitmer's handling of the pandemic as part of their motive to kidnap her.

=== Lawsuits ===
In April, multiple lawsuits were filed challenging Whitmer's executive orders. The suits were filed by individuals, business owners, recreational fishermen, a conservation organization, and several county prosecutors. They alleged that her orders were overly broad, violated their constitutional rights, harmed businesses, and amounted to an unconstitutional taking of property rights. Governor Whitmer's third stay-at-home order, issued April 24, overturned the restrictions on recreational boating and visits to vacation homes, effectively ending some of the lawsuits.

On April 29, inmates from various Michigan prisons filed a class action lawsuit against the Michigan Department of Corrections in the U.S. District Court for the Eastern District of Michigan, claiming the state is violating the Eighth Amendment by subjecting inmates to cruel and unusual punishment by not taking necessary pandemic precautions.

On May 6, a group of churches sued Governor Whitmer, claiming "Executive Order 2020-70 continues to prohibit gatherings of two or more individuals, including at churches, thereby denying them the ability to hold worship services and otherwise carry out their ministry functions until May 28, 2020" violates their First Amendment right of freedom of religion.

On May 22, a group of independently owned gyms and fitness centers sued Governor Whitmer and the state's top health official the in U.S. District Court for the Western District of Michigan in Grand Rapids attempting to overturn the state's stay-at-home order and allow them to reopen. Whitmer re-opened gyms and fitness centers on September 9.

On May 29, the Department of Justice filed a statement that supports a lawsuit filed by seven Michigan businesses that challenged the restrictions imposed by Governor Gretchen Whitmer in response to the COVID-19 pandemic. On June 2, Governor Whitmer stated in an opinion piece that the coronavirus is a civil rights battle too and that she was surprised by the lawsuit.

On October 21, a chiropractors' office in Grand Haven sued the MDHHS, Whitmer, the Ottawa County Department of Public Health and the county's Deputy Health Administrator in the Michigan Court of Claims, arguing that it did not have the authority to mandate the wearing of face masks. The business had received warnings and a cease-and-desist order from local officials over its non-enforcement of the state mask mandate.

On November 17, the Michigan Restaurant and Lodging Association sued the Michigan Department of Health and Human Service's director to block a ban on dine-in service ordered from November 18 until December 8. On November 20, a federal judge denied the request, but scheduled a hearing on the case for November 30.

On December 7, in response to the extension of a partial shutdown order that lasts until December 20, a group of Catholic high schools called the Michigan Association of Non-public Schools sued the state in the United States District Court for the Western District of Michigan on claims that emergency health orders banning in-school classes and religious training are unconstitutional.

==== Emergency powers lawsuit ====
On May 6, Michigan House of Representatives Speaker Lee Chatfield and Michigan Senate Majority Leader Mike Shirkey, both Republicans, sued Governor Whitmer, who is a Democrat, over her use of emergency powers during the pandemic, saying only the Michigan Legislature has the power to extend the state of emergency. The Michigan Court of Claims ruled in Governor Whitmer's favor on May 21. The Michigan Court of Appeals affirmed the Court of Claims' ruling on August 21, in a 2–1 decision.

On October 2, the Michigan Supreme Court ruled on questions posed by District Judge Paul Lewis Maloney over whether Governor Whitmer violated the state Emergency Management Act of 1976, and whether the Emergency Powers of Governor Act of 1945 was unconstitutional. It was argued that Whitmer bypassed a requirement for a vote by the state legislature in order to extend a state of emergency beyond 28 days, by redeclaring it each time it expired. It was also argued that the Emergency Powers of Governor Act constituted an "unlawful delegation of legislative power to the executive". The court unanimously ruled against Whitmer on the former question. The court ruled 4–3 against Whitmer on the latter question.

Michigan Senate Majority Leader Mike Shirkey warned that the decision "does not alter our collective responsibility to protect ourselves and others", and encouraged "bipartisan action to transition from government operating in fear of the virus to government managing life in the presence of the virus." Governor Whitmer argued that the decision was still subject to a 21-day reconsideration period, during which the orders should have still stood. On October 4, Michigan Attorney General Dana Nessel stated that she would stop enforcing COVID-19-related executive orders. On October 5, Governor Whitmer told CNN the decision "undermined my emergency rule, my emergency orders that I've had to enact that puts us in the same state as all other states in this nation, to save lives. We've saved thousands of lives."

In response to the ruling, the Michigan Department of Health and Human Services (MDHHS) issued various orders intended to supplant most of Whitmer's executive orders, including requiring bars to close indoor gathering spaces, restrict the size of gatherings, and require the use of face masks in "social gatherings", defined as a shared space with two or more people where people are from multiple households. Businesses and government offices are required to enforce the requirements for gatherings on their premises. It also requires mask use in all sports except swimming if social distancing is not being practiced. These orders were enacted under the state health code, which gives the director of the HHS the authority to restrict gatherings and "establish procedures" to control an epidemic. The Michigan Occupational Safety and Health Administration similarly issued its own set of emergency rules for workplaces on October 14, again supplanting Whitmer's orders.

On October 12, the Court denied Whitmer's motion for a transition period, officially voiding all executive orders she had issued.

== See also ==
- 2020 in Michigan
- Timeline of the COVID-19 pandemic in the United States
- COVID-19 pandemic in the United States – for impact on the country
- COVID-19 pandemic – for impact on other countries
