= Larry and Danny Ranes =

American serial killers

Larry Ranes
- Born: Larry Lee Ranes; March 22, 1945; Kalamazoo, Michigan, U.S.
- Died: November 12, 2023 (aged 78); Freeland, Michigan, U.S.
- Other name: Monk Steppenwolf
- Status: Deceased
- Conviction: First degree murder
- Penalty: Life imprisonment

Details
- Victims: 1–5
- Span of crimes: April – May 1964
- Country: United States
- States: Michigan (convicted) (possibly Indiana, Nevada, Kentucky)
- Date apprehended: June 5, 1964
- Imprisoned at: Saginaw Correctional Facility

Danny Ranes
- Born: Danny Arthur Ranes; October 20, 1943; Kalamazoo, Michigan, U.S.
- Died: January 29, 2022 (aged 78); Coldwater, Michigan, U.S.
- Status: Deceased
- Convictions: First degree murder Second degree murder (3 counts); Assault with a dangerous weapon
- Penalty: Life imprisonment

Details
- Victims: 4
- Span of crimes: March – August 1972
- Country: United States
- State: Michigan
- Date apprehended: September 5, 1972
- Imprisoned at: Lakeland Correctional Facility

Brent Koster
- Born: Brent Eugene Koster; October 10, 1956 (age 70); Michigan, U.S.
- Status: Paroled
- Conviction: Second degree murder
- Penalty: Life imprisonment

Details
- Victims: 3
- Span of crimes: July – August 1972
- Country: United States
- State: Michigan
- Date apprehended: September 5, 1972

Larry Lee Ranes (March 22, 1945 – November 12, 2023) and Danny Arthur Ranes (October 20, 1943 – January 29, 2022) were American serial killer brothers who committed their crime sprees predominantly in Kalamazoo, Michigan. Larry, a suspect in the murders of five people in the 1960s, was sentenced to life imprisonment for one murder in 1964; Danny was convicted of four sexually motivated murders between March and August 1972 with accomplice Brent Eugene Koster (born October 10, 1956), for which both were sentenced to life imprisonment. Their case is notable for the fact that, unlike other siblings who engage in crime, Larry and Danny operated completely independently of one another.

== Biographies ==
Danny and Larry Ranes were born on October 20, 1943, and March 22, 1945, respectively, in Kalamazoo, Michigan. Influenced by their father's authoritarian parenting, the two brothers constantly competed with one another, often fighting over a handful of cents, in addition to being persuaded to drink alcoholic beverages. In 1954, their father abandoned the family and moved to Florida, where he found a job as a gas station attendant.

In 1958, 13-year-old Larry met a 23-year-old neighbor named Sue, a mother with three children. Over the next few years, he began to spend much of his free time with her and took part in raising her children, eventually beginning an intimate relationship with her. In the early 1960s, both brothers began dating a girl named Kathy from their high school. Larry's academic performance declined, and he dropped out during the tenth grade.

In 1962, Larry, together with a friend, stole a car, but both were quickly arrested. The district attorney's office offered to nullify Larry's sentence if he agreed to enlist in the United States Army, which he did. Larry garnered a negative reputation not long after his enlistment, being repeatedly disciplined for misconduct and chronic alcoholism. In the meantime, his brother Danny married Kathy and had two children. In 1963, Larry attacked a colleague in a drunken stupor, which resulted in his dismissal from the Army and eventual return to Kalamazoo.

Larry repeatedly begged Sue to marry him but was refused each time. Devastated by her refusals, he attempted to take his own life on December 23, 1963, by trying to suffocate himself by inhaling exhaust fumes from his 1958 Plymouth Plaza. Larry was rescued by a police officer and was taken to the Kalamazoo Regional Psychiatric Hospital, where he remained for ten days.

== Murder of Gary Smock ==
On May 30, 1964, Larry, posing as a hitchhiker, was given a lift by 30-year-old Gary Albert Smock, a Plymouth schoolteacher passing through Kalamazoo. During the trip, Larry brandished a weapon and forced Smock to climb into his trunk, where he was subsequently locked in. While continuing the trip, Smock attempted to get out of the car, after which Larry stopped the car, tied him up and then shot him twice in the back of the head. Larry then stole $3 and other items of material value, before leaving the car on the side of the road, where it was discovered a few hours later by a police officer.

Larry was arrested in the early morning of June 5, 1964, in front of his friend's house. He offered no resistance during the arrest, and readily admitted to killing Smock, with items later identified as belonging to Smock by relatives and friends being found in his possession.

When Larry was taken to the police station, he confessed to killing four other people during hold-ups at various gas station. He confessed to the May 30 murder of 33-year-old Charles E. Snider in Elkhart, Indiana; the murder of an Air Force serviceman in Paw Paw, Michigan; the murder of a man in Las Vegas, Nevada; and another man in Kentucky. Larry was unable to name three of his victims, but investigators suspected that one of them might have been 21-year-old Vernon La Benne, a serviceman from Southfield, Michigan. While working at a gas station near Battle Creek, La Benne was shot dead on April 6, a day before he was due to be married. According to Larry, he committed the murders for robbery, and after having consumed all the food and alcohol, intended to take his own life but never went through with it.

Larry was ordered to undergo a psychiatric evaluation, which declared him insane. The examining doctors concluded that the psychological trauma of his childhood abuse caused him to develop a subconscious hatred towards gas stations, as they reminded him of his father.

Larry's trial began on September 29, 1964. On October 8, by jury verdict, he was found guilty of the murder of Gary Smock, and on October 23, he was sentenced to life imprisonment without parole.

== Danny's killing spree ==
After his brother's conviction, Danny began frequently arguing with his wife, as well as demonstrating worsening sexual behavior. In November 1968, he attacked 18-year-old Dorothy King in Battle Creek, taking control of her car at gunpoint. Danny attempted to drive to the outskirts of town so he could rape her, but King managed to escape when he took a wrong turn near the Kellogg Community College, after which he threw away his gun and fled. Danny's car was later found in the parking lot of the pharmacy where King worked and was attacked, and after being identified by the victim, he was arrested.

On February 4, 1969, Danny was found guilty of the felonious assault on King, and on April 15 he was sentenced to three to four years imprisonment. During Danny's imprisonment, his wife divorced him. He was granted parole on February 17, 1972, returned to Kalamazoo and got a job as a gas station operator. During this period, he met 15-year-old vagrant Brent Eugene Koster, a local youth with a troubled family life on account of his schizophrenic mother and alcoholic father. After meeting Koster, Danny provided him with accommodation in one of his girlfriends' trailers and got him a job. With no other role models in his life, and given his age and Danny helping him, Koster would later be easily led into becoming his accomplice.

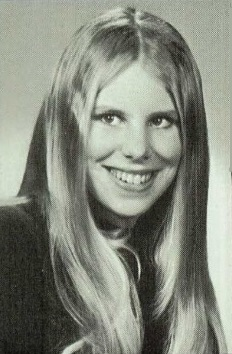
Claudia Bidstrup

On July 5, 1972, Danny and Koster raped and killed 19-year-old Chicagoans Linda Clark and Claudia Bidstrup at a gas station near I-94, where Danny was working at the time. After killing them, the pair wrapped the victims' bodies in a blanket and placed them in the back of their car. Koster then drove the car into a wooded area near Galesburg, where he set it on fire to remove potentially incriminating evidence. Clark and Bidstrup's remains were found fourteen days later by a passing motorcyclist.

On August 5, while driving near the Western Michigan University, Danny and Koster picked up 18-year-old hitchhiker Pamela Fearnow. Threatening the girl with a knife, they took Fearnow to the woodlands surrounding Morrow Lake, near Comstock Township, where they raped her several times before Danny strangled her using a plastic bag.

Despite Danny's instructions, Koster revealed his guilt in the murders to several street workers in September, one of whom turned out to be an informant. He was arrested on September 5, 1972, and interrogated, readily admitting his guilt in the killings and implicating Danny, who was arrested that same evening. During interrogation, Koster also claimed that Danny had confided to him that he had kidnapped, raped and killed 28-year-old Patricia Howk on March 19. Based on his testimony and other incriminating evidence, Danny was charged with the four murders in October 1972.

At Danny's trial, Koster acted as a key witness for the prosecution. Danny was found guilty of first-degree murder for killing Fearnow and second-degree murder for killing Howk; he was sentenced to life without parole on August 9, 1973. He pleaded no contest to second-degree murder for the killings of Clark and Bidstrup and was given two additional life terms. As part of a plea deal, Koster was charged with second-degree murder in the Clark case, to which he pleaded guilty. On July 21, 1975, he was sentenced to life imprisonment with the possibility of parole. The judge told Koster that he deserved to die in prison and people like him were why some wanted the death penalty reinstated in Michigan.

== Aftermath ==
Following their convictions, the Ranes brothers were housed in various penitentiary institutions across Michigan. In the early 1970s, following his brother's conviction, Larry officially changed his name to Monk Steppenwolf, after the protagonist of the Hermann Hesse novel Steppenwolf, which he had read in 1967. While imprisoned, Larry maintained contact with his brother's ex-wife, who married him on March 22, 1976, on his 31st birthday. In August 1986, Larry was visited by journalists in prison for an interview, in which he spoke about being visited by his mother, sister and another woman with whom he had been in a relationship for three years. He spoke impartially about Danny, stating that they had not spoken to one another since the late 1960s. He claimed that, due to the severity of his brother's crimes, the family name became a personification of evil, and a main reason why he legally changed his name.

Larry additionally said he made several attempts at suicide by hanging and by ingesting lacquer thinner and gelatin capsules, all of which occurred in the mid-1960s. In the early 1970s he took up bodybuilding, but at one point stopped playing sports and refused to eat for twenty-nine days, nearly dying from cachexia in the process.

Larry stated that while serving his sentence, he earned a living through usury and social activities, sewing slippers and drawing. He told an interviewer that he had read many books, filling his educational gaps and developing his eloquence, for which he gained a reputation amongst other inmates as a skilled manipulator. According to his claims, during his twenty-two years in prison, Larry had a total of four affairs with four different women, two of which began in prison. In the late 1970s, Larry faced disciplinary action after prison officials learned of a conspiracy by eight inmates to kill another prisoner with a homemade crossbow which Larry designed. Additionally, Larry alleged rampant corruption within the prison, which he and a number of other inmates used to gain access to marijuana.

Larry Ranes died at the Saginaw Correctional Facility on November 12, 2023. His brother, Danny Ranes, died of natural causes at Lakeland Correctional Facility, on January 29, 2022. He was 78-years-old.

Danny's accomplice, Brent Koster, underwent many sex offender rehabilitation programs and earned a law degree. He was an exemplary prisoner according to prison officials, but nonetheless had his parole applications consistently denied. In September 2020, at yet another parole hearing, the commission, taking into account his apparent remorse and the young age during which he committed his crimes, finally approved his application, as he was considered unlikely to reoffend. After spending forty-eight years in prison, the 64-year-old Koster was released from the G. Robert Cotton Correctional Facility on January 21, 2021. He was fully discharged from his sentence on January 21, 2025.

At his final parole hearing, Koster admitted there "was no doubt" that he deserved to spend the rest of his life in prison, agreeing with what the judge told him during his initial sentencing hearing nearly fifty years previously. However, he said he wanted a chance to contribute to society as a free citizen:

"I would like to be given the opportunity to serve the rest of my remaining days in a free community, rather than die in prison. I realize what I did. I realize that it is horribly wrong. But there are circumstances that got me involved in this and one of them is—I mean, I know it’s rare form to blame the co-defendant, but I was—well, shall we say, under the influence—not—I know what I did. I accept responsibility for that. But if it was not for my co-defendant, I would not be sitting here."

Koster gave a full admission of guilt. He said Danny had told him to assist in strangling Clark and Bidstrup with rope. Koster also admitted that while Danny assisted him with killing Bidstrup, he killed Clark himself. "I was hesitant, but I’m knee-deep into this crime," he said at the hearing.

Koster expressed remorse for the murders, saying, "It must have been horrible. I know that. I can’t even begin to realize the pain and suffering that they went through. The only thing I can compare it to is when I lost my father and my mother and the pain and hurt that I went through. But I can imagine it would nowhere compare to what the families went through."

A prison legal service supervisor for Koster and a prison legal service volunteer said she believed Koster was remorseful and ashamed of his participation in the murders. While acknowledging the horrific nature of his crimes, Jacqueline McKinnon said "but he is an adult now. He is not a 15-year-old. I have not seen any evidence whatsoever in the 19 years that I’ve known him that he is impulsive or a predator or anything but responsible and contrite and remorseful for his crimes."

== In the media ==
- The 1987 book Luke Karamazov, written by Conrad Hilberry and Emanuel Tanay, was based on the crimes of the two brothers.
- The 2023 film He Went That Way, directed by Jeffrey Darling is inspired by the novel Luke Karamazov by Conrad Hilberry and based on the real-life account of celebrity animal trainer Dave Pitts who was the sole survivor of Larry's killing spree. The cast includes Zachary Quinto, Jacob Elordi and Patrick J. Adams.

== See also ==
- List of homicides in Michigan
- List of serial killers in the United States

== Cited works and further reading ==
- Barrow, Lauren M.; Rufo, Ron A.; Arambula, Saul (2013). Police and Profiling in the United States: Applying Theory to Criminal Investigations. Boca Raton: CRC Press. ISBN 978-1-466-50436-3.
- Lane, Brian; Gregg, Wilfred (1995) [1992]. The Encyclopedia of Serial Killers. New York City: Berkley Books. ISBN 0-425-15213-8.
- Mariotte, Jeff (2010). Criminal Minds: Sociopaths, Serial Killers, and Other Deviants. New Jersey: John Wiley & Sons Inc. ISBN 978-0-470-87219-2.
- Newton, Michael (2002). The Encyclopedia of Kidnappings. Facts On File Crime Library. New York: Facts On File. ISBN 978-0-8160-4486-3.
- Ramsland, Katherine; Ullman, Tracy (2024). The Serial Killer's Apprentice: The True Story of How Houston's Deadliest Murderer Turned a Kid Into a Killing Machine. Penzler Publishers. pp. 157–160. ISBN 978-1-613-16495-2.
- Ressler, Robert (1993). Whoever Fights Monsters. Sydney: Simon & Schuster. ISBN 0-671-71561-5.
- Wecht, Cyril H.; Saitz, Greg (2007). Mortal Evidence: The Forensics Behind Nine Shocking Cases. New York: Prometheus Books. ISBN 978-1-59102-485-9.
- Wilson, Colin; Seaman, Donald (1988). Encyclopedia of Modern Murder: 1962–1982. New York: Bonanza Books. ISBN 978-0-517-66559-6.
