= Lowell Amos =

American murderer (1943–2022)

- MDOC Inmate Mugshot of Amos from 2017
- Born: Lowell Edwin Amos; January 4, 1943; Anderson, Indiana, U.S.
- Died: January 5, 2022 (aged 79); Lakeland Correctional Facility, Coldwater, Michigan, U.S.
- Status: Deceased
- Conviction: First degree murder
- Penalty: Life imprisonment

Details
- Victims: 1–4

Lowell Edwin Amos (January 4, 1943 – January 5, 2022) was an American convicted murderer and suspected serial killer whose mother and three wives all died under suspicious circumstances. He was convicted in 1996 of murdering his third wife, Roberta Mowery Amos, and was the subject of a 2006 Lifetime Network made-for-TV movie called Black Widower. Amos was a former General Motors plant manager. Some sources spell his first name as "Lowel".

== Death of Roberta Amos ==
In December 1994, Lowell and Roberta Amos attended a company executive party at the Atheneum Hotel in Detroit. The Amoses went to their suite at 4:30 am. Four hours later, Lowell called Bert Crabtree, another executive from the party, and seemed to be in a panic. Crabtree and another hotel guest named Daniel Porcasi went to the room, and Lowell told them that Roberta had died in an accident. Lowell said he needed to clean up before calling police, and he asked Porcasi to take his sport coat for him. Porcasi, while driving home that morning, looked inside the breast pocket of the coat, and found a small black leather case with a syringe without a needle, and a foul-smelling washcloth inside. Amos later reclaimed the coat, and its contents disappeared.

Amos told police that he and Roberta had engaged in sexual acts involving cocaine, and claimed she was still taking the cocaine when he fell asleep. He told police that she could not snort the drug due to a sinus problem, and that instead she took it "inside" her body. He said that when he woke up, she was dead.

There was cocaine on the bed linen, including the part that was tucked under the mattress. Roberta's body contained over fifteen times the lethal dose of the drug. An autopsy revealed that there was cocaine inside Roberta's vagina, but none externally. Police suspected that Amos had washed the body before calling police. Forensic scientist Dr. Phyllis Goode found lipstick and toothmarks on a pillowcase, and other makeup residue, although Roberta did not have any makeup on her when police arrived. The bedsheets were also slightly soiled, although Roberta's body was very clean.

== Investigation into previous wives', and mother's deaths ==
Police lacked enough concrete evidence to bring charges against Lowell, so they began surveillance and investigated his background. Two days after Roberta's death, Lowell spent over $1,000 on dinner and drinks with two women with whom he proceeded to have sex. After the story of Roberta's death had gained publicity, several women came forward and told investigators that they thought they had been drugged by Lowell before having sex.

Investigators found out that Lowell's first wife Saundra died under suspicious circumstances at age 36, in 1979. Saundra was found dead in her bathroom. Lowell's statement to police at that time was that Saundra had mixed wine with a sedative, collapsed, and hit her head. The cause of death was ruled indeterminate, and Amos received a $350,000 insurance payout.

Shortly after Saundra's death, Lowell married Carolyn. According to friends, Lowell and Carolyn argued frequently over the large insurance policies Lowell had bought on her life, and since he would not cancel the policies, she threw him out in 1988.

Lowell moved in with his mother, who was rushed to the hospital a few weeks later, seemingly stupefied. No specific diagnosis was found, and she was released. Several days later, she died. Lowell had told Carolyn over the telephone that his mother had died and when she arrived at the house, Lowell was throwing his belongings into the car. He told her that he did not want people to know that he was living with his mother. Because she was 76 years old, no autopsy was performed, and authorities presumed she died of natural causes. Lowell inherited more than $1 million.

Carolyn allowed Lowell to move back in with her. Nine months later, she was found dead in her bathroom. Lowell's statement to police was that he had taken her a glass of wine to the bathroom, where she was blow-drying her hair next to the full bathtub. Later, he found her dead in the bath, apparently electrocuted. No cause of death was ever determined. The wine glass that Lowell claimed to have brought Carolyn was not in the bathroom, but was found rinsed clean and in the dishwasher. Lowell received $800,000 from the insurance policies, and Carolyn died intestate.

== Conviction, imprisonment, and death ==
Lowell was arrested for the murder of his third wife. Due to a 1994 change in Michigan law, the prosecution was allowed to enter details of previous incidents into the trials. Prosecutors also argued that although Lowell lacked a financial motive for killing Roberta, as he had for the other three deaths, his marriage was about to end. Roberta had already bought a house of her own, and had told friends and family that she wanted Lowell out of her life.

The prosecution surmised that Lowell killed her because he could not stand rejection. They said that he first gave her a glass of wine with two crushed sedatives in it, then when she was passed out, he injected her vagina with the cocaine (dissolved in water), and then smothered her with the pillow when she began to convulse.

On October 24, 1996, Lowell was convicted of premeditated murder and murder using a toxic substance (considered separate charges of first-degree murder), and on November 4, 1996, was sentenced to life imprisonment without the possibility of parole. He was held in security level II at the Lakeland Correctional Facility in Michigan. Charges were never made in the cases of the other three deaths. In 1998, Lowell's appeal was rejected.

Amos died in prison on January 5, 2022, a day after his 79th birthday.

== See also ==
- List of homicides in Michigan
