= Murder of the DeLisle children =

1989 murder in Wyandotte, Michigan, US

- Lawrence DeLisle, convicted of the murder of his four children
- Location: Wyandotte, Michigan, U.S.
- Date: August 3, 1989; 37 years ago
- Attack type: Filicide
- Weapon: Station wagon
- Victims: 4
- Perpetrator: Lawrence DeLisle

In August 1989, Lawrence John DeLisle (born September 6, 1960) killed his four children by driving the family station wagon into the Detroit River in Wyandotte, Michigan. A jury found DeLisle guilty of four counts of first-degree murder after a trial in June 1990. In year-end polls of Associated Press newspapers, the DeLisle case ranked as the No. 7 news story in Michigan in 1989 and the No. 6 story of 1990.

== Before the murder ==
=== DeLisle family ===
Lawrence DeLisle was a high school dropout who married at age 19. Prior to the murders, he was the service manager at a tire store in Lincoln Park, Michigan, earning an annual salary of $31,000. DeLisle was 28 years old at the time of the murders. His wife, Suzanne DeLisle, was 32 years old. They had four children, ages nine months to eight years. Shortly before the murders, the family moved from a two-bedroom townhouse in Taylor, Michigan, to a larger house in Lincoln Park.

=== Prior suicide in same vehicle ===
On the night of February 9, 1988, DeLisle's father, Richard DeLisle, drove his 1977 Ford station wagon to Elizabeth Park in Trenton, Michigan. He then shot himself in the head with a .38-caliber pistol. Lawrence DeLisle received the station wagon as a gift from his stepmother after his father's death. Lawrence later told his stepmother that he "felt a closeness with his father when he was in that car."

== Murder ==
On the night of August 3, 1989, DeLisle, his wife, and their four children ran a series of errands. They shopped for children's beds, purchased ice cream, and stopped to buy cookies at a drug store located about a block and a half from the Detroit River in Wyandotte. After leaving the drug store, DeLisle drove at an estimated speed of 45–55 miles per hour (72–89 km/h) for 300 feet (91 m) down Eureka Road, crashed through a wooden barrier, and plummeted into the Detroit River. DeLisle stated after the incident that he had a leg cramp and the accelerator became jammed. His wife stated that she tried to "turn the steering wheel" but was unable. DeLisle and his wife escaped from the vehicle. A passing powerboat rescued them from the river. The four DeLisle children remained trapped in the vehicle as it sank 25 feet (7.6 m) to the bottom of the river. Between 10:10 p.m. and 11:10 p.m., divers from the Wayne County Sheriff's Department pulled the bodies of the four children from the vehicle. The four victims were:

- Brian DeLisle, age eight years
- Melissa DeLisle, age four years
- Kathryn DeLisle, age two years
- Emily DeLisle, age nine months

The parents and children were transported to Wyandotte General Hospital. The children had no vital signs when they arrived at the hospital, and doctors tried unsuccessfully to resuscitate them. At 1:30 a.m., Melissa was taken by helicopter to Henry Ford Hospital in Detroit, and Brian followed by helicopter at 3:50 a.m. The resuscitation efforts were unsuccessful, and all four children were pronounced dead.

== Investigation and prosecution ==
=== Initial investigation ===
DeLisle told police that, while driving along the river bank, he had suffered a cramp in his leg. He had stopped the car for a few minutes while he bought some crackers and said he felt better afterwards; however, as they drove towards the river his leg became cramped again and jammed his foot into the accelerator. His other foot became stuck between the pedals as he tried to hit the brake. Suzanne reached over to try and switch off the ignition, but it was too late and the car crashed into the river.

However, police were suspicious of DeLisle's story. He told them that he and Suzanne only made it out of the car after its wheels had touched the bottom of the river, but witnesses to the crash said they had seen him in the water before the car was fully submerged. It was also determined that the car had sunk onto its roof after being flipped over by the current, further contradicting DeLisle's account. DeLisle's car, which could be identified as it only had one working taillight, had also been seen moving slowly down the dead-end street where the crash occurred the night before the murders. Investigators began to suspect that DeLisle had crashed the car intentionally in an apparent murder-suicide.

=== August 10 interrogation of DeLisle ===
On August 10, DeLisle and his wife were picked up by police at 7 a.m. They were transported to Lansing, Michigan, to meet with the Michigan State Police. Lawrence was given a polygraph examination and interviewed by police officers through the day. He was formally placed under arrest and in handcuffs at 6:05 p.m. and was then transported to the Wyandotte police station. Between 10:45 p.m. and 1 a.m. the next day, Wyandotte police sergeant Daniel Galeski resumed the interviews which elicited videotaped statements that some characterized as a confession.

DeLisle told Galeski that he had been preoccupied for weeks with his debts and bills. He also described his hatred toward the car in which his father shot himself without saying goodbye. DeLisle also complained about his wife and home life: "That's all I wanted. Clean house. Sex now and then. Happy kids." He insisted that he loved his wife and kids, but "I just wanted it to be over ... The constant repetition. Same thing day after day."

With respect to the day of the incident, DeLisle told Galeski that he "just couldn't" apply the brakes as the vehicle headed toward the river. He continued, "I didn't want to. I don't know why ... I didn't mean to hurt my babies ... I didn't even realize they were in the car. My mind just went blank."

DeLisle also stated that he had previously held a lighted candle to a leaking gas line connected to the home's gas dryer. He held the candle there for half an hour but nothing happened. Of that incident, he said, "I just wanted to be free ... blow up everything in my past."

At the end of the interview with Galeski, DeLisle stated that he did not even want to go to trial: "Just throw away the key."

After reading the transcripts of Galeski's interview with DeLisle, author and journalist Mitch Albom was reminded of Henry David Thoreau's line, "The mass of men lead lives of quiet desperation." Reviewing the various factors that weighed on DeLisle's mind, Albom wrote that he finally understood Thoreau's words and concluded, "It scares the hell out of me."

=== DeLisle charged with murder ===
On August 11, 1989, DeLisle was charged with four counts of first-degree murder and a fifth count of attempting to murder his wife. At the time the charges were announced, Sergeant Galeski told the press that DeLisle confessed that he "intentionally pressed down on the accelerator" and drove into the river to "get rid of his present burdens ... his children and wife."

=== Motion to suppress "confession" ===
DeLisle's attorney, Frank Eaman, filed a pretrial motion to suppress the statement DeLisle made in the interrogation by Galeski. Eaman contended that the tapes of the interrogation were nothing more than "the ramblings of a tortured and tormented man."

DeLisle claimed that his statements to Galeski were the result of "brainwashing". In the days after the accident, he said he felt deeply guilty for the deaths of his children and was subjected to news crews camped on his porch and threatening phone calls. He also said he had only two or three hours of sleep during the nights leading up to the interrogation. DeLisle further claimed that police pressured him to admit he had acted intentionally and suggested that; (i) he could get a lenient sentence if he "told the truth", (ii) he may be suffering from a split personality, and (iii) there was a demon inside him. DeLisle also claimed that during the long drive from Lansing to Wyandotte, Galeski blasted the air conditioning and refused to give him a blanket. The defense presented testimony from a psychologist that the police tactics had "loosened DeLisle's grip on reality."

On December 21, 1989, Wayne County Judge Robert Colombo Jr. ruled that the statement was inadmissible, finding that the police had used improper psychological techniques in eliciting it. Despite being found inadmissible, media outlets filed a motion seeking access to the tapes of the interrogation. The motion was granted, and the tapes were played for media representatives and reported to the public in January 1990. The Michigan Court of Appeals in May 1990 affirmed Judge Colombo's ruling that DeLisle's statement was not voluntary or admissible.

=== Trial and conviction ===
In December 1989, the court released DeLisle on bail of $25,000 pending trial.

In the lead-up to the trial, DeLisle's attorneys repeatedly moved for a change of venue on the grounds that widespread media coverage of DeLisle's inadmissible confession had made it impossible for an impartial jury to be seated locally. However, the court ultimately decided that a fair trial was possible; although all twelve jurors who were ultimately seated had admitted prior knowledge of the case, seven remembered no more than that a crash had occurred, and five remembered the confession but stated that it would not affect their judgement.

DeLisle was tried in June 1990. For the first time in Michigan judicial history, photographers and television camera crews were permitted to take photographs and video from an enclosed booth at the rear of the courtroom. A motion by defense counsel to move the trial out of Wayne County was denied. A further defense motion to have the case decided by the judge was also denied.

The trial lasted five days. DeLisle's wife Suzanne testified that her husband's leg had cramped before they stopped for snacks and that he had pulled over to rub the leg for several minutes. She further testified that, after they left the drug store, her husband cried out in pain, saying, "Oh my God! My leg's cramping up." She testified that he then reached down and pulled his leg a couple inches off the accelerator, but the car nevertheless continued to race into the river. Suzanne also told the court that the car's engine had "raced" on several prior occasions while the car was in drive. A neurologist testified that a sudden leg cramp could have caused DeLisle's leg to jam into the accelerator, and mechanic James Cokewell testified that there were several faults with the DeLisle's car which could have led to uncontrollable acceleration.

Witnesses for the prosecution included accident reconstruction expert Irving Rozian, who testified that a slight indentation on the left front wheel of the station wagon indicated that the car had struck the curb at a slight angle to the right before going in the river. Rozian testified that this was consistent with DeLisle having changed direction in order to drive between the barricade posts into the river. Two witnesses also identified DeLisle's station wagon as the one that had been seen driving slowly up to the barricade the night before the crash, which, the prosecution argued, pointed to DeLisle having carried out reconnaissance of the scene in anticipation of staging the crash there the next day. Other witnesses, including the boatman who had rescued DeLisle, testified that he had made no effort to rescue his children and had said "something to the effect of, 'Oh my God, what have I done?'" when he was pulled from the water.

The jury deliberated for eight-and-a-half hours before finding DeLisle guilty. One of the jurors noted that the jury concluded that the wife was trying "to save her husband" and her testimony was found to be contradictory.

=== Sentencing and trial judge's doubts about guilt ===
On August 1, 1990, DeLisle was sentenced to five mandatory life terms without the possibility of parole. DeLisle read a statement at the hearing in which he stated:

A father's job is to protect his children and I failed. I panicked. I froze. That is my guilt, not murder ... I was paralyzed with shock and unable to react. That is my crime.

DeLisle's wife also spoke at the sentencing, reaffirming her belief that her husband did not murder their children. While giving the sentence required by law, Judge Colombo stated at the time that the sentence bothered him because "I don't know if he's guilty" of first-degree murder, adding "I just don't know." By the time of DeLisle's parole hearing in March 2024 Colombo was quoted as agreeing with the jury's verdict and believing in DeLisle's guilt, referring to DeLisle as a "mass murderer".

=== Appeal ===
DeLisle appealed the verdict, asking that he be granted a new trial. Among other things, DeLisle's counsel argued that the trial court's decision to allow the confession tapes to be released to the press, even after the confession was ruled to be coerced and inadmissible, was a grave error that tainted the jury pool. Five of the twelve jurors admitted knowing about at least some of the suppressed evidence from the alleged confession.

The Court of Appeal split with eight judges voting to affirm the conviction and seven voting to grant a new trial. Six of the dissenters opined that the lower court "actively and intentionally fostered the unfair publicity" by releasing the inadmissible confession to the media.

== Aftermath ==
Suzanne DeLisle divorced Lawrence after the trial and later remarried. At a parole hearing in March 2024 a letter from Suzanne was read in which she stated her belief that he had killed their children and tried to kill her, alleging she had been gaslit into believing in his innocence during the trial.

In 2014, DeLisle spoke from prison to a WWJ news anchor. DeLisle asserted that he was a "good, kind and innocent man" who was "unethically crucified by defamatory media reporting." He continued to assert that a leg cramp and a sticky accelerator were responsible for the vehicle's plunge into the Detroit River.

As of August 16, 2025, DeLisle remains incarcerated at the Lakeland Correctional Facility in Coldwater, Michigan.

== See also ==
- List of homicides in Michigan
