= Freeland Walleye Festival =

Festival and fishing competition in Michigan, US

- Freeland Walleye Festival logo introduced in 2024

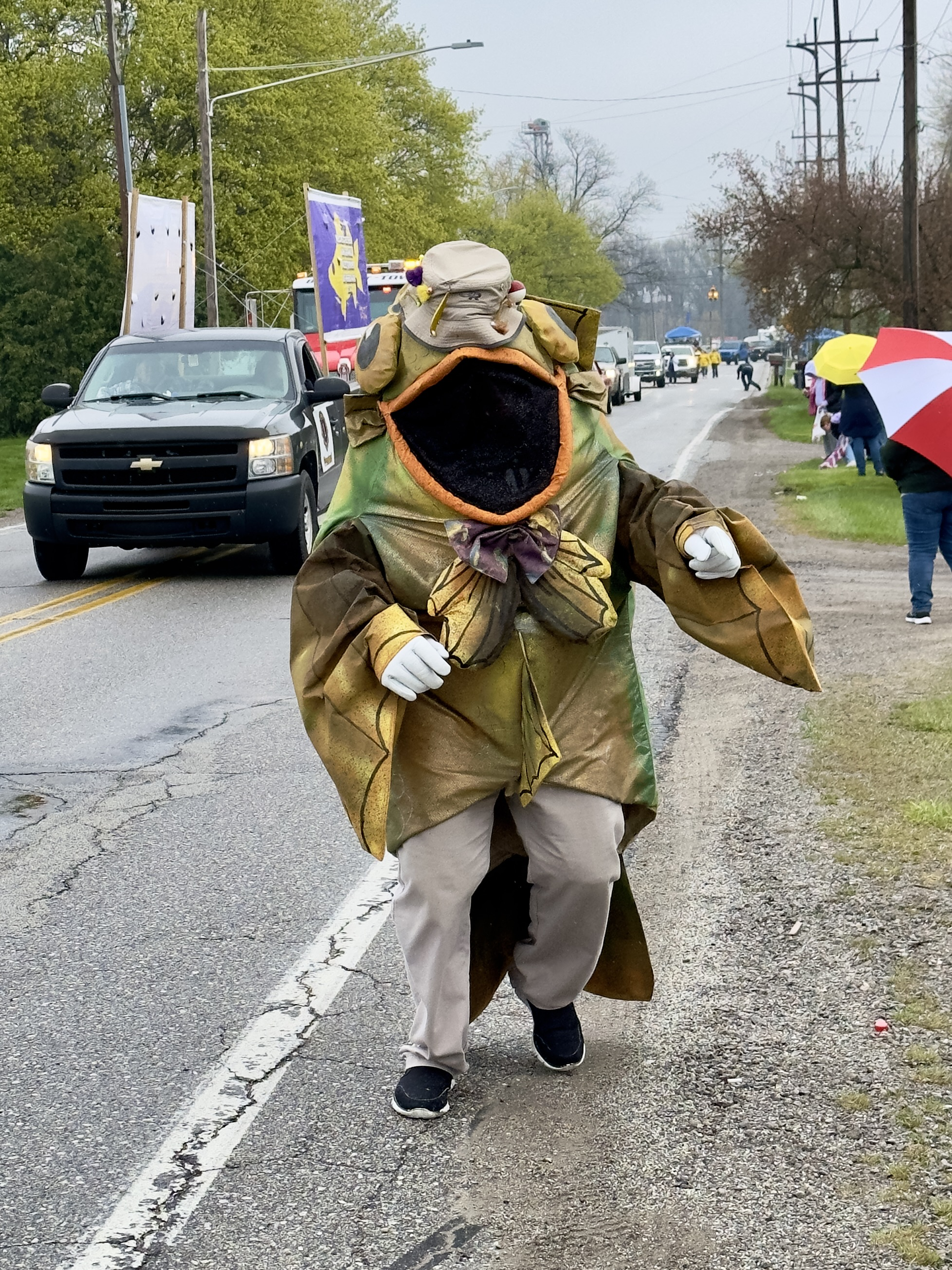
- Freeland Walleye Festival 2023 Parade
- Genre: Festival
- Dates: April
- Frequency: Annually
- Location: Freeland, Michigan
- Country: United States
- Years active: 1985–
- Inaugurated: 1985
- Attendance: 5,000+ (2023)
- Organizer: Freeland Lions Club
- Website: freelandwalleyefestival.com

The Freeland Walleye Festival is an annual gathering and fishing competition held in the town of Freeland, Michigan. It is hosted by the Freeland Lions Club and celebrates the walleye and local community.

== History ==
The festival began in 1985 as a walleye fishing competition and fundraiser for the Freeland chapter of the Lions Clubs International. Since then, it has expanded to include a number of other activities around Freeland.

In the early 2010s, it was attended by approximately 30,000 people.

== Activities ==
In addition to the walleye competition, the festival hosts a number of activities including a parade, carnival, beer tent, and city-wide garage sale.

=== Fishing competition ===
The festival began as a walleye fishing competition, which it still hosts today.

=== Parade ===
The festival hosts a parade which runs through Freeland.

== Organization ==
The festival is hosted by the Freeland chapter of the Lions Clubs International.

Proceeds have been used to fund the development of the Freeland Festival Park and additional improvements at the Freeland Memorial Park. It also provides funding for the Freeland Summer Concert Series and Freeland Sports Zone.
