= Lakeland Correctional Facility =

State prison in Michigan, United States

Coordinates: 41°57′54″N 84°59′44″W

- Interactive map of Lakeland Correctional Facility
- Location: 141 1st Street Coldwater, Michigan
- Status: open
- Security class: II
- Capacity: 1466
- Opened: 1985
- Managed by: Michigan Department of Corrections

The Lakeland Correctional Facility is a state prison for men located in Coldwater, Branch County, Michigan, owned and operated by the Michigan Department of Corrections.

The facility was opened in 1985 and has a working capacity of 1500 prisoners held at a medium security level.

== Notable detainees ==
- Lawrence DeLisle - convicted of the Murder of the DeLisle children
- Jerald Leroy Wingeart - murderer of Dawn Magyar, at the time of conviction in November 2001, the longest unsolved murder case in the history of Michigan at 28 years.
- Larry Ranes - serial killer who was sentenced to life without parole.
- Lowell Amos - convicted murderer and suspected serial killer, died in prison in 2022.

== See also ==
- Impact of the COVID-19 pandemic on prisons
