= Freeland, Michigan =

- Census-designated place (CDP) & unincorporated community
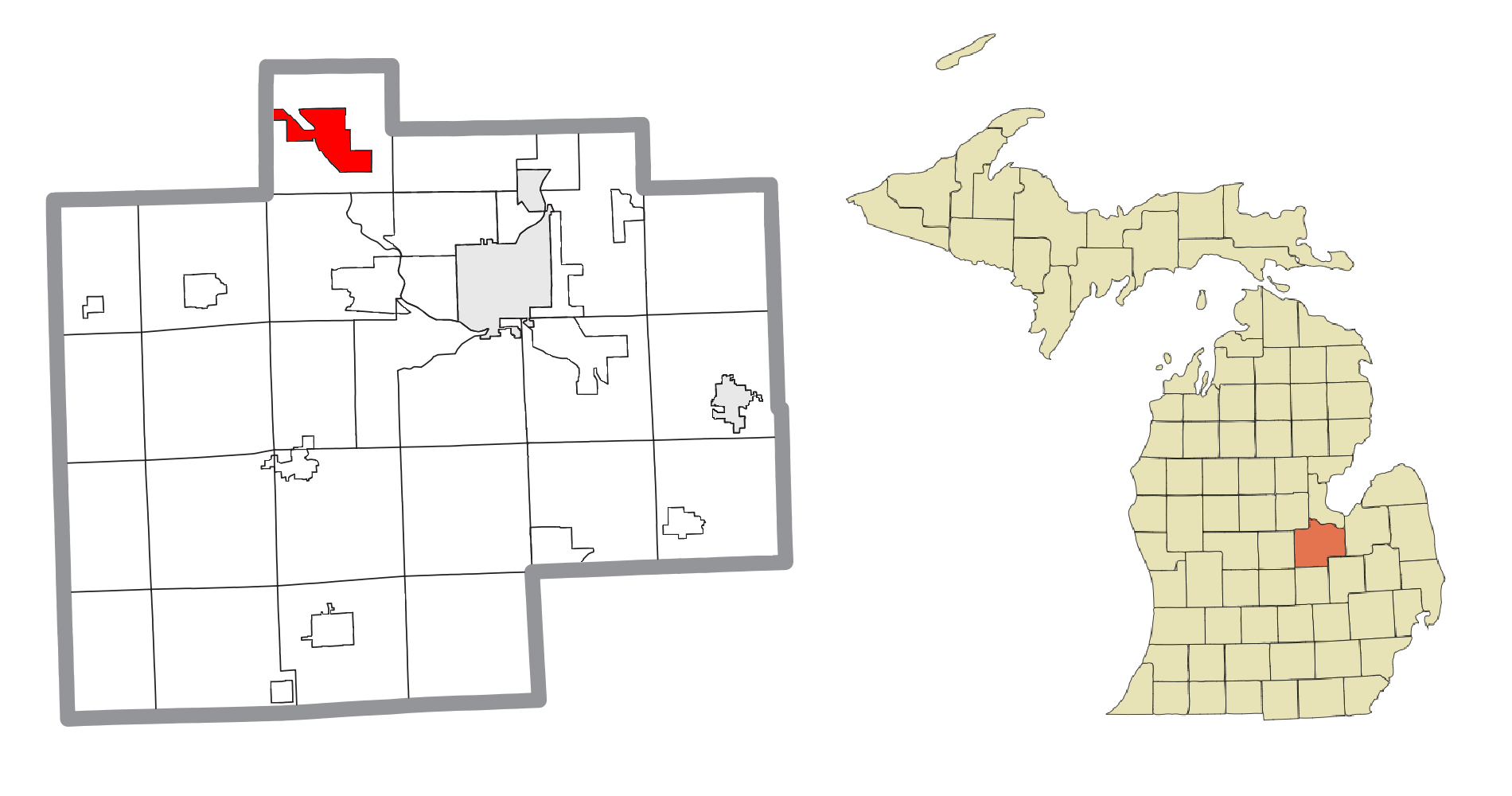
- Location within Saginaw County

- Location within the state of Michigan Freeland (the United States)
- Coordinates: 43°31′12″N 84°06′45″W
- Country: United States
- State: Michigan
- County: Saginaw
- Township: Tittabawassee

Area
  - Total: 6.72 sq mi (17.41 km^{2})
  - Land: 6.59 sq mi (17.06 km^{2})
  - Water: 0.14 sq mi (0.35 km^{2})
- Elevation: 623 ft (190 m)

Population (2020)
  - Total: 7,630
  - Density: 1,158.2/sq mi (447.17/km^{2})
- Time zone: UTC-5 (Eastern (EST))
  - Summer (DST): UTC-4 (EDT)
- ZIP code(s): 48623
- Area code: 989
- FIPS code: 26-30540
- GNIS feature ID: 2393012

Freeland is a census-designated place in Tittabawassee Township, Saginaw County in the U.S. state of Michigan. It is part of the Saginaw-Midland-Bay Metropolitan Area. As of the 2020 census, the CDP population was 7,630. The CDP covers an area in the central portion of Tittabawassee Township. The Freeland post office, ZIP code 48623, serves nearly the entire township, as well as portions of Midland and Williams townships to the north, Frankenlust and Kochville townships to the east, Thomas and Richland townships to the south, and Ingersoll Township to the west.

It is the location of MBS International Airport, which serves three major nearby cities: Saginaw, Bay City and Midland.

It is also the location of the Saginaw Correctional Facility, which is a level I, II and IV maximum security prison.

== History ==
The place was home to Native Americans long before the arrival of European settlers. In the 1819 Treaty of Saginaw, the Chippewa, Ottawa, and Pottawatomi ceded a large portion of land, including Saginaw County, to the United States federal government. In that treaty, within the ceded territory, several tracts were reserved for specific groups of Chippewa. One such tract, Black Bird's Village, consisted of 6,000 acres (24 km^{2}) on the Tittabawassee (named as the Tetabawasink river in the text of the treaty), very near to the present location of Freeland.

In the 1850s, lumbering outposts developed in the area, one of which was called "Loretta", which was given a post office named "Jay" in April 1856. The office was named for the first postmaster, Jefferson Jaqruth. This outpost was very nearly at the geographical center of Tittawabasse Township. Another settlement was placed just a little to the north. in 1867, one resident of the second locale, George Truesdale, instigated moving the post office from Loretta to his settlement, which retained the name of Jay for several years afterwards.

The name of Freeland comes from "Mammy Freeland" who operated a popular tavern on the river, frequented by lumbermen and rivermen, who came to refer to the entire settlement as Freeland. The name of the post office was changed to Freeland in January 1879. It was also a station on the Pere Marquette Railroad. By another account (Moore), the Freeland family name was prominent in the business and politics of the area.

During World War II, the airport now known as MBS International was used to hold German and Japanese prisoners of war.

In 1985, Freeland's Lions Clubs International chapter began the annual Freeland Walleye Festival.

== Geography ==
According to the United States Census Bureau, the CDP has a total area of 6.7 square miles (17 km^{2}), of which 6.7 square miles (17 km^{2}) is land and 0.04 square miles (0.10 km^{2}) (0.45%) is water.

== Notable people ==
- Aleda E. Lutz, WWII Army Flight Nurse, second most decorated woman in U.S. history.

== Demographics ==
Historical population
Census	Pop.	Note	%±
2020	7,630		—
U.S. Decennial Census

=== 2020 census ===
As of the 2020 census, Freeland had a population of 7,630. The median age was 37.9 years. 22.4% of residents were under the age of 18 and 13.3% of residents were 65 years of age or older. For every 100 females there were 143.2 males, and for every 100 females age 18 and over there were 155.3 males age 18 and over.

92.1% of residents lived in urban areas, while 7.9% lived in rural areas.

There were 2,280 households in Freeland, of which 40.8% had children under the age of 18 living in them. Of all households, 63.2% were married-couple households, 12.5% were households with a male householder and no spouse or partner present, and 18.4% were households with a female householder and no spouse or partner present. About 19.1% of all households were made up of individuals and 7.9% had someone living alone who was 65 years of age or older.

There were 2,355 housing units, of which 3.2% were vacant. The homeowner vacancy rate was 1.2% and the rental vacancy rate was 3.2%.

Racial composition as of the 2020 census
Race	Number	Percent
White	6,344	83.1%
Black or African American	799	10.5%
American Indian and Alaska Native	28	0.4%
Asian	47	0.6%
Native Hawaiian and Other Pacific Islander	1	0.0%
Some other race	79	1.0%
Two or more races	332	4.4%
Hispanic or Latino (of any race)	321	4.2%

=== 2000 census ===
As of the 2000 census, there were 5,147 people, 1,441 households, and 1,115 families residing in the CDP. The population density was 769.7 inhabitants per square mile (297.2/km^{2}). There were 1,527 housing units at an average density of 228.3 per square mile (88.1/km^{2}). The racial makeup of the CDP was 82.86% White, 13.04% African American, 0.64% Native American, 0.49% Asian, 0.06% Pacific Islander, 0.82% from other races, and 2.10% from two or more races. Hispanic or Latino of any race were 3.17% of the population.

There were 1,441 households, out of which 40.8% had children under the age of 18 living with them, 65.4% were married couples living together, 9.0% had a female householder with no husband present, and 22.6% were non-families. 18.5% of all households were made up of individuals, and 5.6% had someone living alone who was 65 years of age or older. The average household size was 2.68 and the average family size was 3.08.

In the CDP, the population was spread out, with 22.1% under the age of 18, 7.9% from 18 to 24, 43.3% from 25 to 44, 20.3% from 45 to 64, and 6.4% who were 65 years of age or older. The median age was 34 years. For every 100 females, there were 161.1 males. For every 100 females age 18 and over, there were 182.6 males.

The median income for a household in the CDP was $55,455, and the median income for a family was $67,083. Males had a median income of $50,225 versus $33,306 for females. The per capita income for the CDP was $20,470. About 2.7% of families and 2.6% of the population were below the poverty line, including 2.0% of those under age 18 and 6.5% of those age 65 or over.

== Climate ==
This climatic region is typified by large seasonal temperature differences, with warm to hot (and often humid) summers and cold (sometimes severely cold) winters. According to the Köppen Climate Classification system, Freeland has a humid continental climate, abbreviated "Dfb" on climate maps.

=== Significant weather events ===
Freeland experiences a humid continental climate and is occasionally affected by severe thunderstorms, tornadoes, winter storms, and flooding events. While destructive tornadoes are uncommon in the area, several notable weather events have impacted the community and surrounding portions of Tittabawassee Township.

==== May 1985 tornado outbreak ====
On May 31, 1985, Freeland was affected by severe thunderstorms associated with the 1985 United States–Canada tornado outbreak, one of the deadliest tornado outbreaks in Great Lakes history. While no major tornado was recorded directly within the community, strong thunderstorms and damaging winds affected portions of Saginaw County as multiple tornadoes occurred elsewhere across Michigan and neighboring states.

The outbreak remains one of the most significant severe weather events to affect the Great Lakes region and helped increase public awareness of tornado preparedness throughout Mid-Michigan.

==== June 2021 Mid-Michigan severe weather ====
On June 25–26, 2021, a line of severe thunderstorms crossed Mid-Michigan, producing widespread tree damage and power outages throughout the Tri-Cities region. Wind gusts exceeding 60 mph (97 km/h) were reported in portions of Saginaw County, including the Freeland area.

The storms caused scattered property damage and temporary power outages but no confirmed tornadoes within Freeland. The event was part of a broader severe weather outbreak affecting much of Lower Michigan.

==== June 2026 tornado ====
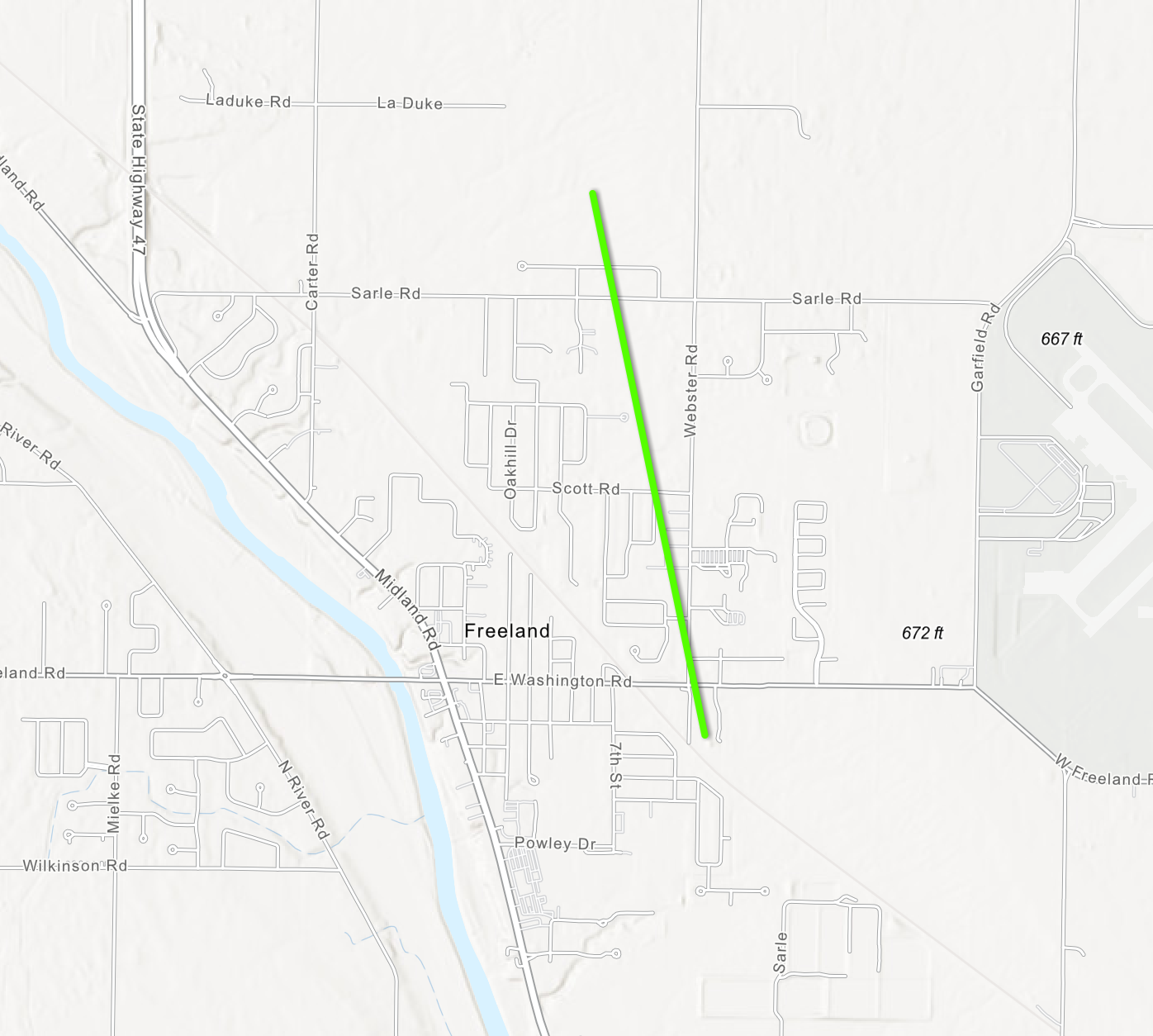
Approximate path of the June 9, 2026 EF1 tornado through Freeland and Tittabawassee Township.

On June 9, 2026, an EF1 tornado struck Freeland during a severe weather outbreak across Lower Michigan. The tornado touched down in the western portion of the community and remained on the ground for approximately 1.44 miles (2.32 km), producing estimated peak winds of 90 mph (145 km/h).

Damage included roof and siding failures, downed trees, damaged outbuildings, and overturned recreational vehicles. Local officials estimated that between 30 and 40 homes sustained damage, while thousands of utility customers across Saginaw County temporarily lost electrical service. No fatalities were reported.

== Transportation ==
The main highway running through Freeland is M-47, which goes northbound to US-10, and southbound towards Thomas Township, Michigan, and Saginaw, Michigan
