= Tittabawassee Township, Michigan =

- Civil township
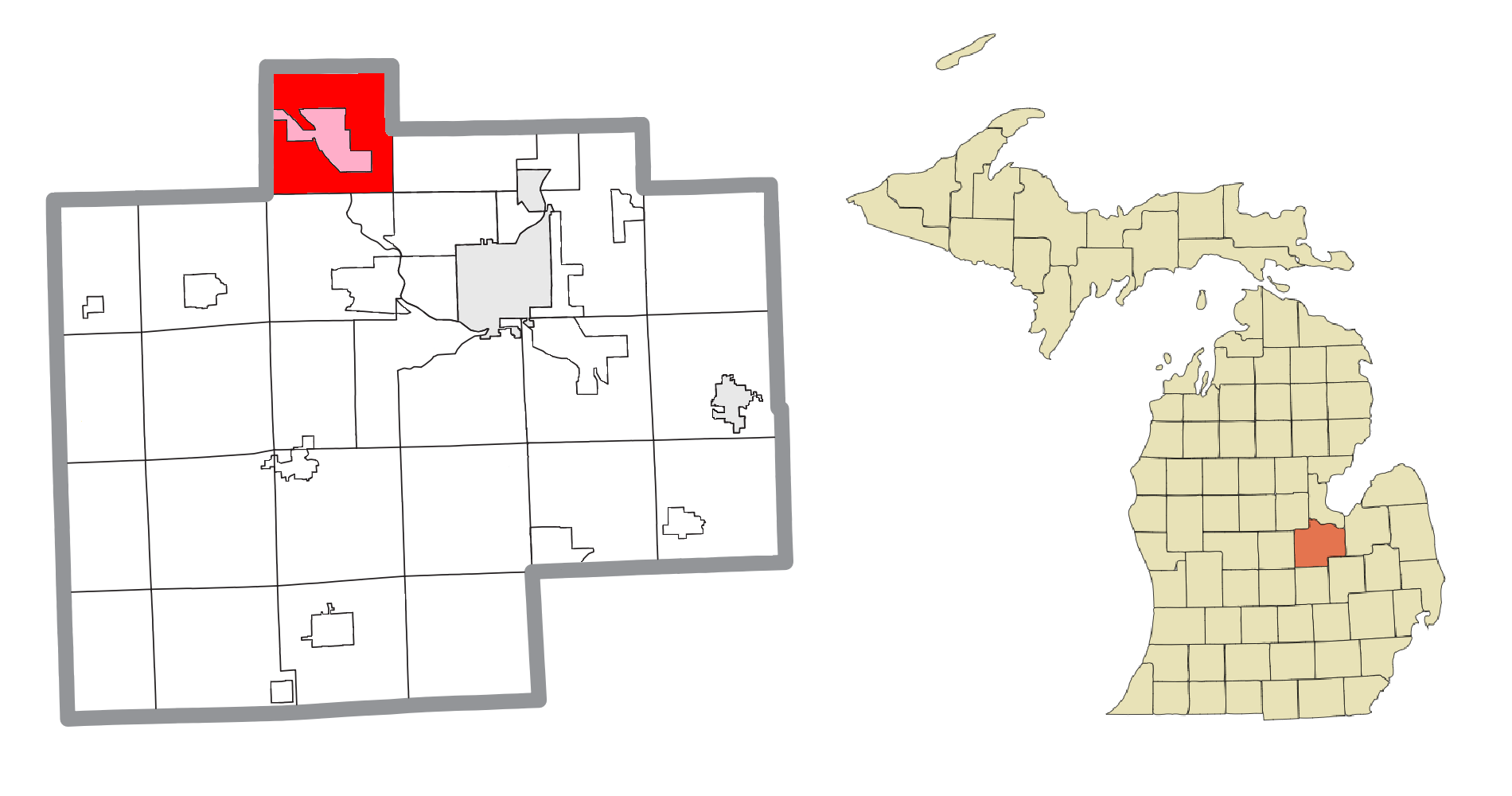
- Location within Saginaw County (red) and the administered community of Freeland (pink)

- Location within the state of Michigan Tittabawassee Township (the United States)
- Coordinates: 43°31′27″N 84°07′19″W
- Country: United States
- State: Michigan
- County: Saginaw

Government
  - Supervisor: Rick Hayes
  - Clerk: Robert DuCharme

Area
  - Total: 35.5 sq mi (91.9 km^{2})
  - Land: 35.2 sq mi (91.1 km^{2})
  - Water: 0.31 sq mi (0.8 km^{2})
- Elevation: 643 ft (196 m)

Population (2020)
  - Total: 10,606
  - Density: 303.7/sq mi (117.3/km^{2})
- Time zone: UTC-5 (Eastern (EST))
  - Summer (DST): UTC-4 (EDT)
- ZIP code(s): 48603 (Saginaw); 48623 (Freeland)
- Area code: 989
- FIPS code: 26-79840
- GNIS feature ID: 1627166
- Website: Official website

Tittabawassee Township (/ˈtɪtəbəˈwɑːsi/ TIH-tə-bə-WAH-see) is a civil township of Saginaw County in the U.S. state of Michigan. The 2020 Census placed the population at 10,606. The township is named for the Tittabawassee River.

== Communities ==
- Freeland is an unincorporated community and census-designated place (CDP) in the Township.

== Geography ==
According to the United States Census Bureau, the township has a total area of 35.5 square miles (92 km^{2}), of which 35.2 square miles (91 km^{2}) is land and 0.3 square miles (0.78 km^{2}) (0.87%) is water.

== Demographics ==
As of the census of 2000, there were 7,706 people, 2,383 households, and 1,849 families residing in the township. The population density was 219.0 inhabitants per square mile (84.6/km^{2}). There were 2,508 housing units at an average density of 71.3 per square mile (27.5/km^{2}). The racial makeup of the township was 87.32% White, 8.89% African American, 0.53% Native American, 0.48% Asian, 0.04% Pacific Islander, 0.78% from other races, and 1.96% from two or more races. Hispanic or Latino of any race were 3.01% of the population.

There were 2,383 households, out of which 39.2% had children under the age of 18 living with them, 66.2% were married couples living together, 8.6% had a female householder with no husband present, and 22.4% were non-families. 18.3% of all households were made up of individuals, and 5.7% had someone living alone who was 65 years of age or older. The average household size was 2.69 and the average family size was 3.08.

In the township the population was spread out, with 23.9% under the age of 18, 7.5% from 18 to 24, 39.2% from 25 to 44, 22.0% from 45 to 64, and 7.4% who were 65 years of age or older. The median age was 35 years. For every 100 females, there were 137.8 males. For every 100 females age 18 and over, there were 148.2 males.

The median income for a household in the township was $54,980, and the median income for a family was $66,455. Males had a median income of $50,137 versus $30,994 for females. The per capita income for the township was $20,554. About 4.3% of families and 4.7% of the population were below the poverty line, including 4.0% of those under age 18 and 6.8% of those age 65 or over.

== Government and infrastructure ==
Saginaw Correctional Facility is located in the township.

Also, the "R1SE Education and Recreation Center", an innovative tutoring facility, is located in Tittabawassee Township.
