= Saginaw Correctional Facility =

Prison in Michigan, United States

Saginaw Correctional Facility (SRF)
- Interactive map of Saginaw Correctional Facility (SRF)
- Location: Tittabawassee Township, Michigan; 43.5079161°N 84.103679°W
- Status: Open
- Security class: Levels I, II, and IV
- Opened: 1993
- Managed by: Michigan Department of Corrections
- Warden: Ben Ruby and Kevin Ritchie
- Website: Official website

Saginaw Correctional Facility (SRF) is a Michigan prison, located in Tittabawassee Township, for adult male inmates.

== Facility ==
The prison was opened in 1993 and has eleven main buildings totaling approximately 303,850 square feet (28,229 m^{2}) and occupying 43 acres (17 ha) of the 142 acres (57 ha) site. The facility has seven housing units used for Michigan Department of Corrections male prisoners 18 years of age and older. Three of the housing units are used for Level II prisoners, three other housing units are used for Level IV (higher security level) prisoners, and one house unit is used for Level I (lowest security level) prisoners. Onsite facilities provide for foodservice, health care, facility maintenance, and prison administration.

=== Security ===
The facility is surrounded by double 12 feet (3.7 m) fences with razor-ribbon wire. A third fence was added in 1996, and two gun towers were added in 1997. Electronic detection systems, closed-circuit television, and armed patrol vehicles are also utilized to maintain perimeter security 24/7.

== Services ==
The facility offers libraries, education programs, and religious services. It is designated as a Michigan Prisoner ReEntry Initiative (MPRI) In-Reach facility. Onsite medical care is supplemented by local hospitals and the Duane L. Waters Hospital in Jackson, Michigan.

== Notable inmates ==
Inmate Name	Register Number	Status	Details
Ivan Page	228562 / 1573294M	Serving a life sentence.	Murdered 3 women.

- Adam Shigwadja - Shigwadja was sentenced to 175 months to 30 years in prison for first-degree home invasion and second-degree arson in the Sept. 15, 2014 attack on his ex-girlfriend Sophia Putney-Wilcox. Was profiled on CBS's 48 Hours.
- Monk Steppenwolf - Serial killer sentenced to life without parole.
- Elias Abuelazam - Murderer and suspected serial killer sentenced to life in prison.

== See also ==
- List of Michigan state prisons
