= David Icove =

American FBI Agent

David J. Icove
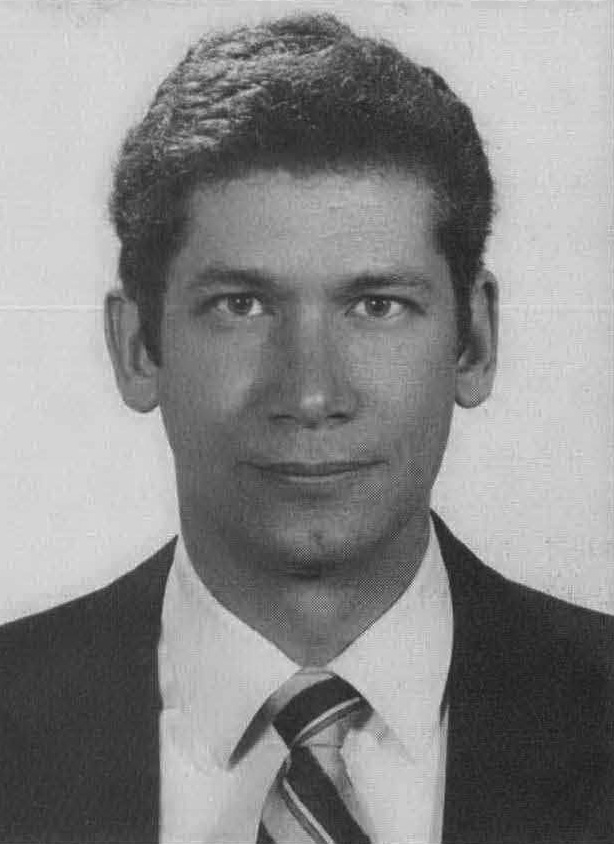
- Icove c. 1986
- Born: May 14, 1949 (age 77); Akron, Ohio, U.S.
- Education: Shaker Heights High School, 1967; BS-Electrical Engineering, University of Tennessee; BS-Fire Protection Engineering, University of Maryland; MS-Electrical Engineering, University of Tennessee; Ph.D.-Engineering Science and Mechanics, University of Tennessee
- Alma mater: UT Knoxville and University of Maryland
- Occupation: Professor of Practice
- Employer(s): University of Tennessee, Min H. Kao Dept. of Electrical Engineering and Computer Science
- Known for: Expert in forensic engineering investigation and reconstruction of fires and explosions
- Board member of: Murder_Accountability_Project
- Call sign: WA8NQE, FCC Amateur Radio. Extra Class

David J. Icove (born May 14, 1949) is a former Federal Bureau of Investigation Criminal Profiler and FBI Academy Instructor in the elite Behavioral Analysis Unit. He was one of the FBI's first criminal profilers to specialize in the apprehension of serial arsonists and bombers. He is a Fellow of the National Academy of Forensic Engineers and co-author, along with Gerald A. Haynes, of Kirk's Fire Investigation, the leading textbook in the field of fire investigation.

== Early life and education ==
David Icove was born May 14, 1949, in Akron, Ohio, and raised in Shaker Heights, Ohio. He graduated in 1967 from Shaker Heights High School and attended college at the University of Tennessee and the University of Maryland.

== Career ==
A leading authority in forensic engineering examinations of fires and explosions, he is co-author of Kirk's Fire Investigation, Combating Arson-for-Profit, and Forensic Fire Scene Reconstruction, three of the leading expert treatises in the field.

Kirk's Fire Investigation has long been regarded as the primary textbook in the field of fire investigation. It is currently in its 8th edition (published in 2017, ISBN 978-0-13-423792-3). Paul Leland Kirk (1902–1970), the author of the original text Fire Investigation, was the basis for Kirk's Fire Investigation.

Hired in 1984 by the Federal Bureau of Investigation, National Center for the Analysis of Violent Crime, he developed the first modern-day motive classification system for arson for the FBI. He also developed at the FBI an Artificial Intelligence research project known as PROFILER PDF, a rule-based expert system programmed to detect and link serial violent crimes using data parsed from real-time news stories, the Violent Criminal Apprehension Program, and other FBI databases.

Representing the FBI, he testified three times before key U.S. Congressional Committees seeking guidance on key legislative initiatives.

In 1993, he transferred to the U.S. Tennessee Valley Authority Police to eventually become the Assistant Chief of Police for Criminal Investigations. After the September 11 attacks, he represented TVA full-time as a Task Force Agent on the FBI's Joint Terrorism Task Force, until his retirement in 2005.

In May 2015, he joined a board of directors to form the Murder Accountability Project (MAP), a nonprofit organization that detects and disseminates information about homicides, especially unsolved killings and serial murders committed in the United States. MAP's board consists of a group of retired detectives, investigative journalists, homicide scholars, and a forensic psychiatrist, who strive to use Artificial Intelligence to identify and link clusters of homicides based upon a combination of victim/offender relationships, manner of death, and geographic location.

As of 2019, David Icove is the UL (safety organization) Professor of Practice at The University of Tennessee in the Department of Electrical Engineering and Computer Science, where he directs their Fire Protection Engineering Graduate Program.

== Professional associations ==
- Registered Professional Engineer
- Board Certified Diplomate and Fellow, National Academy of Forensic Engineers
- Fellow, Society of Fire Protection Engineers
- Senior and Life Member, Institute of Electrical and Electronics Engineers
- Member, National Society of Professional Engineers
- Member, National Fire Protection Association
- Member and Certified Fire Investigator, International Association of Arson Investigators

== Awards ==
- Shaker Heights High School Alumni Hall of Fame, Class of 1967
- Charles Edward Ferris Award – University of Tennessee
- National Arson Prevention Award – Insurance Committee for Arson Control

== Personal ==
Dr. Icove currently resides in Knoxville, Tennessee.

== See also ==
- Crime Classification Manual
- FBI Method of Profiling
- fire investigation
- Kirk's Fire Investigation
- Offender profiling
