= Forensic electrical engineering =

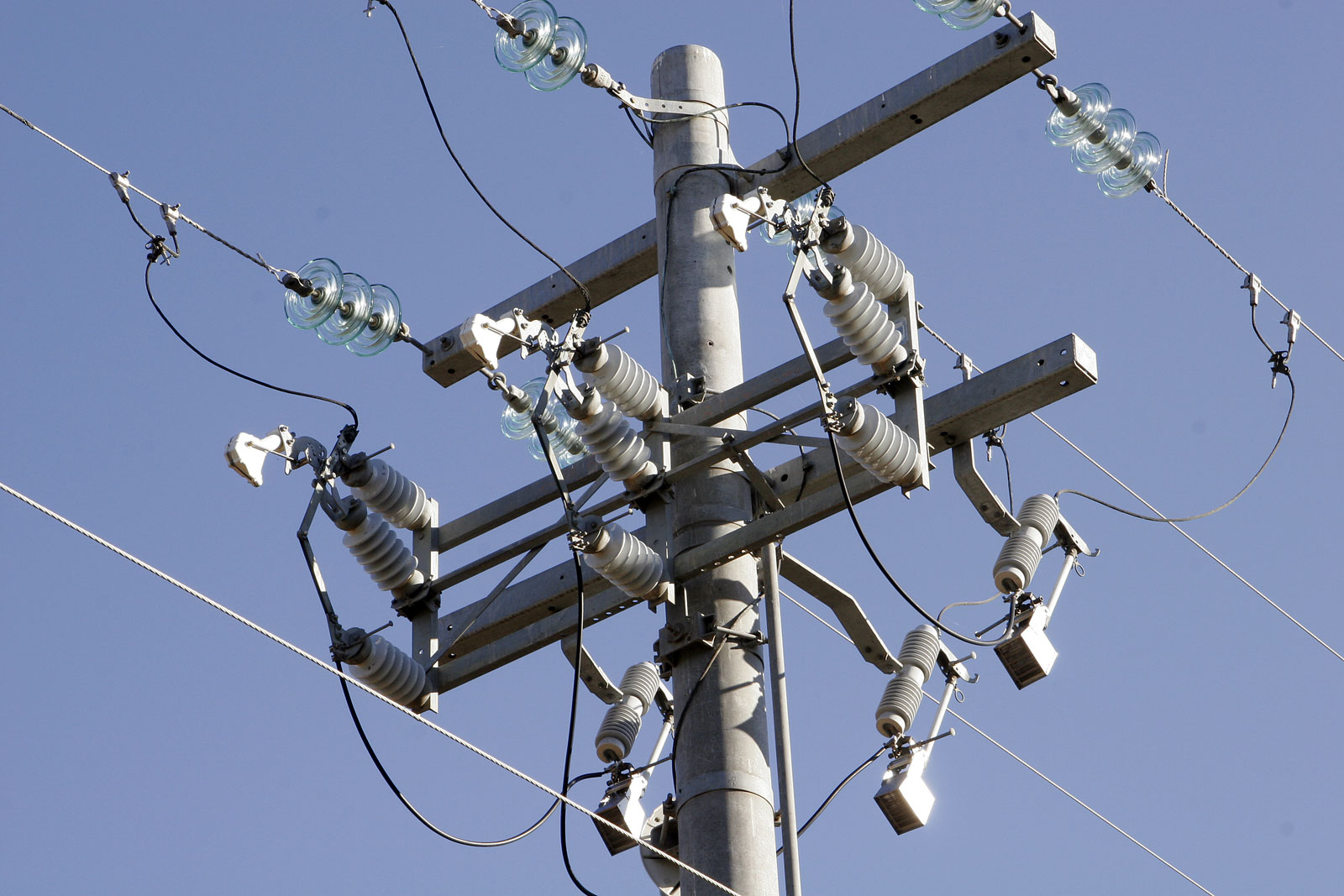
Medium-voltage overhead power line

Forensic electrical engineering is a branch of forensic engineering, and is concerned with investigating electrical failures and accidents in a legal context. Many forensic electrical engineering investigations apply to fires suspected to be caused by electrical failures. Forensic electrical engineers are most commonly retained by insurance companies or attorneys representing insurance companies, or by manufacturers or contractors defending themselves against subrogation by insurance companies. Other areas of investigation include accident investigation involving electrocution, and intellectual property disputes such as patent actions. Additionally, since electrical fires are most often cited as the cause for "suspect" fires, an electrical engineer is often employed to evaluate the electrical equipment and systems to determine whether the cause of the fire was electrical in nature.

== Goals ==
The ultimate goal of these investigations is often to determine the legal liability for a fire or other accident for purposes of insurance subrogation or an injury lawsuit. Some examples include:

- Defective appliances: If a property fire was caused by an appliance which had a manufacturing or design defect (for example, a coffee maker overheating and igniting), making it unreasonably hazardous, the insurance company might attempt to collect the cost of the fire damage ("subrogate") from the manufacturer; if the fire caused personal injury or death, the injured party might also attempt an injury lawsuit against the manufacturer, in addition to the carrier of health or life insurance attempting subrogation.
- Improper workmanship: If, for example, an electrician made an improper installation in a house, leading to an electrical fault and fire, he or she could likewise be the target of subrogation or an injury lawsuit (for this reason, electricians are required to carry liability insurance).
- Electrical injury: If an electrical fault or unreasonably hazardous electrical system causes an electrical injury ("electrocution" if the injury is fatal), the party responsible for the electrical accident can be the target of insurance subrogation or an injury lawsuit.
- Equipment failure: if electrical equipment stops functioning, it can cause a loss of income (such as a factory losing productivity due to inoperative equipment) or additional damage (such as food products spoiling due to loss of refrigeration), and again be the subject of a subrogation or liability case. Liability in such a case can also include the cost of repairing or replacing the equipment, which can be substantial.

== Applications ==
Forensic electrical engineers are also involved in some arson and set-fire investigations; while it is not common for arsonists to cause electrical failures to ignite fires, the presence of electrical appliances and systems in many fires scenes often requires them to be evaluated as possible accidental causes of the fire. Some electrical means of ignition, when discovered, are fairly obvious to an origin and cause investigator and most likely do not require consulting with a forensic electrical engineer. (Note that "arson" refers specifically to a criminal act, subject to criminal prosecution; a more general term is a "set fire". A homeowner setting a fire deliberately in order to defraud an insurance company might be prosecuted for arson by a government body; however, the insurance company would concern itself only with denying the insurance claim, possibly leading to a civil lawsuit.)

Patent disputes may also require the expert opinion of an electrical engineer to advise a court. Issues in conflict may include the precise meaning of technical terms, especially in the patent claims, the prior art in a particular product field and the obviousness of various patents.

== Liability ==
Most states have a statute of ultimate repose (similar to, but not to be confused with, a statute of limitations) that limits the length of time after which a party can legally be held liable for their negligent act or defective product. Many states have a "useful life" statute of ultimate repose. Therefore, a determination of the length of time the product would normally be expected to be used before wearing out needs to be made. For example, a refrigerator might have a longer "useful life" than an electric fan; an airplane might have a longer useful life than a car. Some states pick an arbitrary number of years for the statute of ultimate repose. It may be short (six or seven years) or longer 15 or 25 years. If a coffee maker starts on fire after the statute of ultimate repose has expired, the manufacturer can no longer be held liable for manufacturing or design defects. The statute of ultimate repose is different from the statute of limitations. In a state with a short statute of ultimate repose, it is common that a person's right to bring a claim in court expires before their injury ever occurs. Thus, if a defective product (for example a car) caused a collision when the steering failed, but the collision occurred after the expiration of a statute of ultimate repose, no claim could be brought against the manufacturer for selling a defective product. The right to bring the claim expired before the claim even occurred.

== See also ==
- NFPA 70 (the National Electrical Code)
- NFPA 921 ("Guide for Fire and Explosion Investigations")
- Kirk's Fire Investigation (textbook by John DeHaan)
- Arc mapping
- Fire investigation
