= Arc mapping =

Arc mapping is a technique used in fire investigation that relies on finding the locations of electrical arcs and other electrical faults that occurred during a fire; the locations of the electrical faults can then, under some circumstances, indicate the progression of the fire over time. It is usually performed by a forensic electrical engineer. It The technique relies on the assumption that, when heat from fire (or from hot gases caused by the fire) impinges on an electrical line (whether or not protected by a conduit), it will melt the wire insulation and cause an electrical fault at the first point that it reaches on the electrical line. For this to occur, the electrical line must be energized at the time that fire hits it.

== Origin of fire ==
Arc mapping often aims to determine the point of origin of the fire. A common assumption used in reaching this goal is that the fire expands uniformly in all directions as it burns, and maintains a circular shape centered on the point of origin; therefore, when an electrical fault occurs on an electrical line, the point of origin is on a perpendicular to that point. Contrary to this assumption, however, in many cases fire does not extend uniformly; in particular, large local fuel loads, venting, and air currents have a strong effect on fire progression.

Several other factors affect the locations where electrical faults occur. Electrical faults do not always occur where fire first reaches a conduit, but preferentially occur at bends in a conduit or at locations where wires are pressed together. The elevation of an electrical line has a strong effect on its exposure to heat, since temperatures in a fire are generally highest near ceiling level, except in the immediate vicinity of the point of origin. Protection from the fire is an important consideration: being located within a wall or being covered in fiberglass insulation will offer some protection to an electrical line, and will delay electrical faults.

== Electrical faults ==
An electrical fault will only occur if an electrical line is energized - more specifically, if two conductors are at different potentials, and have the capacity to source/sink significant current. An electrical arcing event will often (though not always) cause a loss of power downstream on the electrical line, such as by severing the conductors or tripping a circuit breaker; as a result, a significant part of arc-map analysis is determining the order in which sections of electrical lines lost power. In most cases, the electrical faults that occurred furthest downstream occurred first. Electrical faults can also energize conductors or components that are not normally energized, such as conduits (normally grounded). ("Energized" usually refers to a conductor being connected to hot power, as opposed to neutral. More generally, electrical faults occur between points at different potentials, such as between hot and neutral, between hot and ground, or between hots of two different phases.)

== Electrical arcing ==
Investigators distinguish between electrical arcing and copper that melted due to the high temperatures of the fire. The term "electrical arcing", in fire investigation, often refers to "melted copper that indicates that electrical arcing occurred". "Melted copper" generally refers not to copper that is currently melted, but to "previously melted, resolidified copper". NFPA 921 and Kirk's Fire Investigation give some guidelines and illustrations on distinguishing between electrical arcing and other melted copper; however, these strict guidelines occasion much debate.
