= Ibaraki Femicides =

Suspected serial killings in Ibaraki, Japan

The Ibaraki Femicides are an unsolved which quadruple feminicides occurred between 1999 and 2004 in ibaraki. Four murders occurred over a five-year period, one of which has been solved. It is unclear whether these crimes were committed by a serial killer or by multiple independent perpetrators.

== List of murders ==
- Tomomi Kawamata: Strangled on April 10, 1999. last time she was seen, she was with a Italian man. Her body was discovered on May 3.
- Mai Sato: Went missing in summer festival on July 9, 2003, and three days later, the body was discovered. cause of death was strangulation.
- Minori Harada: Went missing on January 31, 2004, and body was found naked in the river the following morning, cause of death was stbbing. Filipino Rampano Jericho Mori is an arrested as a suspect on September 2, 2017, Mori is a confessed to raped and murdered Harada with two Filipino accomplices. Mori is a Sentenced to life imprisonment and this case is the only one of the four murder cases that has been solved.
- Erina Hirata: Murdered to suffocation on June 20, 2004. Within an hour of her death, she had reported with phone to the police that she had been robbed.

== See also ==
- Chicago Strangler
- Femicide in Ciudad Juárez
- Tokyo Metropolitan Murders
