= Benjamin Atkins =

American serial killer (1968–1997)

- Atkins in 1994
- Born: Benjamin Thomas Atkins; August 26, 1968; Detroit, Michigan, U.S.
- Died: September 17, 1997 (aged 29); Charles Egeler Reception and Guidance Center, Jackson, Michigan, U.S.
- Other names: The Woodward Corridor Killer; The Highland Park Strangler; Tony
- Motive: Sexual Sadism
- Convictions: First degree murder (x11); First degree criminal sexual conduct
- Penalty: Life imprisonment

Details
- Victims: 11 Murdered 1 Survived
- Span of crimes: December 14, 1991 – August 21, 1992
- Country: United States
- State: Michigan
- Date apprehended: August 21, 1992

Benjamin Thomas Atkins (August 26, 1968 – September 17, 1997), also known as The Woodward Corridor Killer, was an American serial killer and rapist who raped and tortured 12 women, murdering 11 of them in Highland Park and Detroit, Michigan, during a period of eight months between December 1991 and August 1992. Atkins was apprehended by police with the assistance of his sole surviving victim, who rode with officers around the area and was able to identify Atkins as her attacker. After he was arrested for rape charges connected to her case, Atkins confessed the crimes he had committed to officers. Atkins was found guilty and given several life sentences in April 1994. He died from AIDS in 1997.

== Early life ==
Benjamin "Tony" Atkins was born on August 26, 1968, in Detroit, the younger of two sons. His family lived in a poor neighborhood, and both of his parents were drug addicts and alcoholics. His father left the family shortly after Atkins's birth. In 1970, Atkins was abandoned by his mother and placed in an orphanage, where he spent his childhood. In the orphanage, Atkins was physically assaulted by other children. An employee of the orphanage sexually molested and raped Atkins at the age of 10 and was subjected to sexual harassment by other boys for the 5 years he remained in the orphanage. At the age of 15, Atkins ran away and reunited with his mother and older brother. Atkins's mother worked as a prostitute and Atkins and his brother witnessed her have sex with clients on several occasions in their home and in her car. Additionally, Atkins stated that he was sexually assaulted in his mother's home by a man. By the late 80's, Atkins was homeless, having left the family home. Atkins eventually developed an addiction to crack cocaine.

Atkins lacked formal education and worked low-skilled labor jobs for low wages while spending his nights at homeless shelters. He frequented places inhabited by pimps and prostitutes, but was never arrested for any serious crimes.

Although fond of Atkins, most of his acquaintances noted that when under the influence of alcohol or drugs, he showed signs of an antisocial personality and displayed misogynistic behavior.

== Victims ==
Atkins mainly chose young destitute women as victims, while he also targeted one middle-aged woman (Vicki Beasley-Brown); his victims were often prostitutes or drug addicts. He would lure them to abandoned buildings where he sexually assaulted them. After strangling his victims, he would leave the bodies at the crime scenes, with some of them discovered months after their deaths

1. In or around October 1991, Darlene Saunders (age 35) had seen Atkins around the neighborhood so when he offered payment for sex, she accepted. Upon entering a vacant restaurant on Woodward Avenue in Highland Park, Saunders was made to lay on broken glass and trash. Afterwards, Atkins attacked Saunders putting her in a chokehold. As the two struggled, someone on the street noticed and Atkins stopped. Saunders survived the attack and testified against Adkins later at both his preliminary hearing and trial. On March 6, 1992, Saunders stopped a police car patrolling on Woodward and told them what had occurred months earlier. In Mid-May, police receive a phone tip regarding the attack of Saunders.
2. On December 14, 1991, the body of Debbie Ann Friday (age 30) was found. Missing since December 8, she was the first victim whose body was discovered. Her remains were found on Elmhurst Drive in Highland Park.
3. On December 30, 1991, the body of Bertha Jean Mason (age 26) was found. On December 11, Mason had left her four children at home with her boyfriend and was last seen entering a store. Her remains were found on Alger in Detroit.
4. On January 3, 1992, the body of Patricia Cannon George (age 36) was found. Workmen discovered her remains while demolishing an abandoned house on Kenilworth in Detroit. George was last seen on November 30, 1991.
5. On January 25, 1992, the body of Vickie Truelove (age 39) was found in the former Longfellow Nursing Home on Woodard in Detroit.
6. On February 17, 1992, the body of Valerie Chalk (age 34) was found in the former Monterey Hotel in Highland Park along with two others, though each were located in separate rooms. Her relatives told police that she had been missing since November 6, 1991, after she was put on a wanted list and that they had been actively looking for her.
7. On February 17, 1992, the body of Juanita Hardy (age 23) was also found in the former Monterey Hotel in Highland Park.
8. On February 17, 1992, the body of an unidentified woman was also found in the former Monterey Hotel in Highland Park. She was later identified by forensic genealogy with the help of Identifinders International in 2024, but her name was withheld by her family's request.
9. On April 9, 1992, the body of Brenda Mitchell (age 38) was found in an abandoned house at Woodard and Grand in Highland Park, four days after she left her mother's home in Detroit on April 5, 1992, and never returned. Authorities had previously classified her death as a drug overdose.
10. On April 15, 1992, the body of Vicki Beasley-Brown (age 43) was found in a vacant apartment in Highland Park on 2nd Avenue. She was last seen alive on March 25 when she went to the store to buy school lunches for her two children that remained at home.
11. On June 15, 1992, the yet-to-be-identified body of JoAnn O'Rourke (age 40) was found in a building in Highland Park. On July 3, the body was identified as that of O'Rourke, a resident of Muskegon.
12. On August 21, 1992, the body of Ocinena Waymer (age 22) was found in Highland Park. While in custody, Atkins gave information as to where her remains could be found.

== Investigation ==
At the end of January 1992, after police had found the bodies of four of Atkins' victims, Atkins was arrested at an abandoned building and taken to the police station for interrogation. Due to a lack of evidence to prove his guilt in the murders, he was released.

In February 1992, after the bodies of Chalk, Hardy and a third woman were found in the former Monterey Hotel, police began investigating a link between 13 other murders that had occurred in Detroit, Inkster, Ypsilanti and Romulus since 1985.

On June 17, 1992, the FBI assigned two special agents to create a special task force in Highland Park.

On July 30, 1992, a summit took place between the FBI agents, Michigan State Police, Detroit Police and Highland Park Police. This meeting would mark the first time the agencies exchanged data with each other regarding the murders.

In July 1992, FBI Agent Paul Lindsay went through hundreds of tips that garnered no leads until he found the report made by Saunders. After interviewing Saunders with Highland Park police, Michigan State Police officer Royce Alston drove Saunders around for over a month until she spotted Atkins on August 20, 1992.

== Arrest ==
On August 20, 1992, Atkins was arrested after he was identified by Saunders. Upon his arrest for the assault of Saunders, Atkins denied any involvement in the murders, claiming that he was homosexual. After further interrogations, the police officers familiarized him with the psychological profile they had compiled of the killer. On August 21, after 12 hours, Atkins admitted to the murders of 11 women. He described in detail the appearance and clothing of the victims and even indicated the whereabouts of the bodies of two victims, Ocinena Waymer and 29-year-old LaTanya Showanda Smith. Their disappearances were not connected to the murders until Atkins' confession, and the bodies were found in the indicated location that same day.

During the interrogation, Atkins said that the motive for the murders was his hatred of women engaged in prostitution. He stated that he lured his victims into abandoned houses by offering them drugs and alcohol, in addition to paying for their sexual services. Contrary to the official version of the investigation, Atkins revealed that the first victim he killed had actually been Patricia George, in the fall of 1991.

On September 23, 1992, Saunders, who had helped police in identifying Atkins, was arrested by Detroit Police and was held in custody for 16 days. Prosecutors had feared that she would not appear at Atkins' preliminary hearing. Saunders stated that she "always intended to appear to testify against Atkins". During cross examination by Atkins' defense attorney, Jeffrey Edison, Saunders admitted that she was a former prostitute and was high on crack cocaine at the time of her attack. However, according to the Detroit Free Press, Saunders "didn't flinch" and "refused to budge from her basic account".

After Saunders testified, Judge William Bledsoe of Michigan's 30th District Court ordered that Atkins stand trial on rape and attempted murder charges of Saunders. At the conclusion of the hearing regarding Saunders, Atkins waived his right to a preliminary hearing in connection with murder of Debbie Ann Friday.

Since no physical evidence could be found to incriminate him, Atkins was charged solely based on Saunders' testimony and his own confession.

== Trial, convictions, and appeal ==
The trial began in January 1994. Around 150 people, including relatives of Atkins' victims, appeared as witnesses for the prosecution at the court hearings. At one of the hearings, Atkins confessed to the murders, but claimed to be insane. For the majority of the trial, he did not react in any way to what was happening and appeared to be isolating himself from the proceedings. His lawyer asked for leniency towards his client, on the grounds that Atkins had been abused as a child. According to the lawyer, the psychological trauma, coupled with drug addiction, eventually led to his mental, emotional and behavioral problems.

Evidence included Atkins' palm print found at one crime scene along with semen and blood stains found at another, both of which matched Atkins. People v. Benjamin Atkins, No. 176793 (Mich. Ct. App. July 29, 1997). One jury decided three of the Detroit murder cases, while a second jury decided the eight murders and one count of sexual assault that occurred in Highland Park. After a four-month trial and three days of deliberations, in April of 1994 Atkins was found guilty of 22 counts of first degree murder and 1 count of first degree criminal sexual conduct. On May 11, 1994, Atkins was sentenced to life in prison for each conviction. Atkins was acquitted in connection with the attempted murder of Saunders charge.

Atkins appealed all of his convictions, alleging that the trial court made an error in allowing 12 separate cases to be prosecuted in one trial before two separate juries. On July 29, 1995, the Michigan Court of Appeals upheld Atkins' convictions finding that in accordance to Michigan Court Rules 6.120(B) offenses are related if they involve "a series of connected acts or acts constituting part of a single scheme or plan.", as well as other state court rules that applied to his trial. People v. Benjamin Atkins, No. 176793 (Mich. Ct. App. July 29, 1997).

== Death ==
After his conviction, Atkins was transferred to the Charles Egeler Reception and Guidance Center, a prison in Jackson. Four years into his sentence he was transferred to Duane Waters Hospital where he died on September 17, 1997, from an AIDS-related HIV infection at the age of 29.

== In media ==
=== Television ===
Woodcut Media and Sky TV (UK) produced an episode of "World's Most Evil Killers" on the Atkins case, releasing in December 2025 in the UK and May 2026 in the U.S. IMDb

=== Books ===
Bates, B. R. (March 11, 2025). The Crack City Strangler: The Homicides of Serial Killer Benjamin Atkins. WildBlue Press. ISBN 978-1964730219.

== See also ==
- Darren Deon Vann, another serial killer of women and girls who were left dead in abandoned buildings.
- List of homicides in Michigan
- List of serial killers in the United States
- List of serial killers by number of victims
