= G. Robert Cotton Correctional Facility =

Prison in Michigan, United States

Coordinates: 42°17′18″N 84°23′16″W

- Interactive map of G. Robert Cotton Correctional Facility
- Location: 3500 N Elm Avenue Jackson, Michigan address
- Status: open
- Security class: mixed
- Capacity: 1974
- Opened: 1985
- Managed by: Michigan Department of Corrections

The G. Robert Cotton Correctional Facility is a state prison for men located in Blackman Charter Township, Jackson County, Michigan, owned and operated by the Michigan Department of Corrections. It has a Jackson postal address.

This facility dates from 1985. Cotton, which is an inmate educational facility, is one portion of the former Michigan State Prison, described as the largest walled prison in the world as late as 1981, when it was rocked by extensive, damaging riots. The prison was divided in 1988 into smaller institutions. As of 2016, Cotton and three other components remain open:

- the Parnall Correctional Facility, a minimum security prison
- the Charles Egeler Reception and Guidance Center, an intake and processing facility for all male state prisoners
- the Cooper Street Correctional Facility, a discharge and processing facility

== Notable inmates ==
Inmate Name	Register Number	Status	Details
John Eric Armstrong	362407 / 2084912M	Serving a life sentence.	Convicted of murdering 5 female sex workers in the 1990s.
