= IAAI =

Iaai may refer to:

- Iaai language, an Austronesian language spoken in New Caledonia

IAAI may be an acronym for:

- Innovative Applications of Artificial Intelligence
- International Association of Arson Investigators

== See also ==
- Vegavis iaai, the type species of Vegavis, an extinct genus of modern birds
