= Parnall Correctional Facility =

Prison in Michigan, United States

Coordinates: 42°17′29″N 84°23′26″W

- Interactive map of Parnall Correctional Facility
- Location: 1780 E Parnall Road Jackson, Michigan address
- Status: open
- Security class: minimum
- Capacity: 1696
- Opened: 1926
- Managed by: Michigan Department of Corrections

The Parnall Correctional Facility is a state prison for men located in Blackman Charter Township, Jackson County, Michigan, owned and operated by the Michigan Department of Corrections. It has a Jackson postal address.

The facility's buildings were first opened in 1926. Present-day Parnall is one portion of the former Michigan State Prison, described as the largest walled prison in the world as late as 1981, when it was rocked by extensive, damaging riots. The prison was divided in 1988 into smaller institutions. As of 2016, Parnell and three other components remain open:

- the G. Robert Cotton Correctional Facility, an educational facility
- the Charles Egeler Reception and Guidance Center, an intake and processing facility for all male state prisoners
- the Cooper Street Correctional Facility, a discharge and processing facility
