= Michigan State Prison =

- U.S. National Register of Historic Places
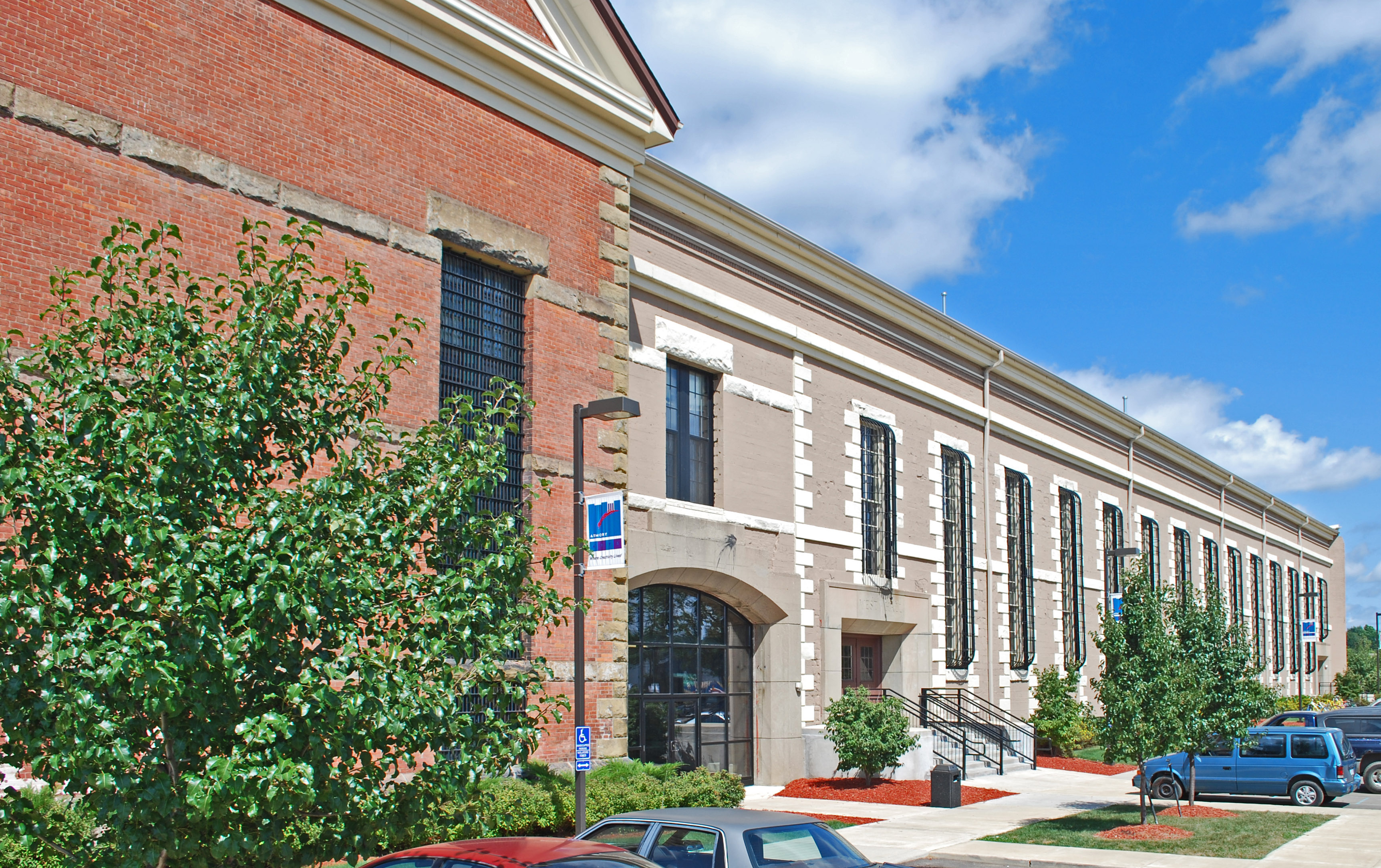

- Location within Michigan Location within the United States
- Interactive map showing the location for Michigan State Prison
- Location: Armory Court and Cooper St., Jackson, Michigan
- Coordinates: 42°15′27″N 84°24′21″W
- Built: 1842
- Architects: Scott & Co.; Lake, Robert
- NRHP reference No.: 79001156
- Added to NRHP: August 10, 1979

Michigan State Prison or Jackson State Prison, which opened in 1839, was the first prison in Michigan. It was located, for a period, in Jackson, Michigan. After 150 years, the prison was divided, starting in 1988, into four distinct prisons, located in Blackman Charter Township,: the Parnall Correctional Facility which is a minimum-security prison; the G. Robert Cotton Correctional Facility where prisoners can finish their general education; the Charles Egeler Reception and Guidance Center which is the common point of processing for all male state prisoners sentenced to any Michigan prison; and the Cooper Street Correctional Facility, which is the common point for processing of all male state prisoners about to discharge, parole, or enter a community center or the camp program.

== History ==
The first permanent structure was constructed in Jackson in 1842. In 1926, the prison was relocated to a new building, and soon became the largest walled prison in the world with nearly 6,000 inmates. The prison was renamed the State Prison of Southern Michigan in 1935. Beginning in 1988, the prison was carved up into several correctional facilities. The Southern Michigan Correctional Facility (JMF), which contained the heart of the 1926 prison structure, was finally closed on November 17, 2007. After JMF was closed, much of the prison remains open however, 7 Block, which used to be quarantine, has been closed and changed into a prison museum and was open to the public for tours. The museum was maintained as a part of Ella Sharp Museum and has since been closed. The original 1842 site was used as a Michigan National Guard armory for some time, and now houses residential apartments as well as several art galleries, the Grand River Farmers Market, and the River & Rail food hub.

=== The original prison ===
The first prison was built in Jackson, Michigan, and became the original nucleus of the city. The enclosed area of the old prison was about 20 acres (81,000 m^{2}). Almost from the beginning, the old prison was chronically overcrowded. In 1876, the problem was mitigated when new prisons were erected in Marquette and Ionia; this only somewhat eased the overcrowding. Throughout its history, new buildings were added continuously. At its peak capacity, the prison housed around 2,200 inmates in four cell blocks and a dormitory. In the older blocks, the cells were very small at only 7 feet (2.1 m) long, by 3 1/3 feet wide, by 6 1/2 feet high. In the newer blocks built in 1904, the cells measured 9 feet (2.7 m) × 5 1/2 feet × 7 feet (2.1 m). Women prisoners were confined at the Michigan State Prison up until 1852; there had been 10 female prisoners committed up until that date.

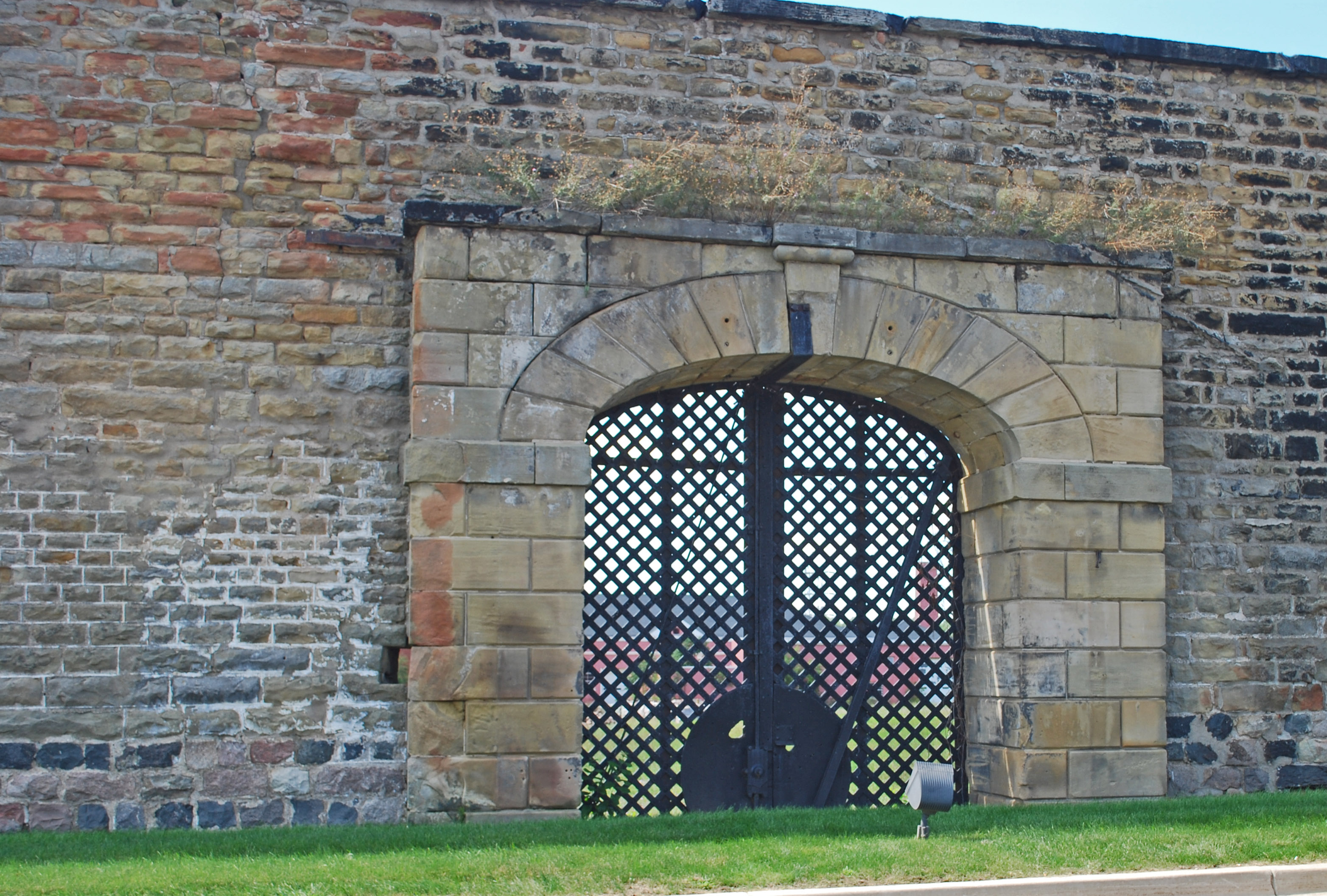
East side gate

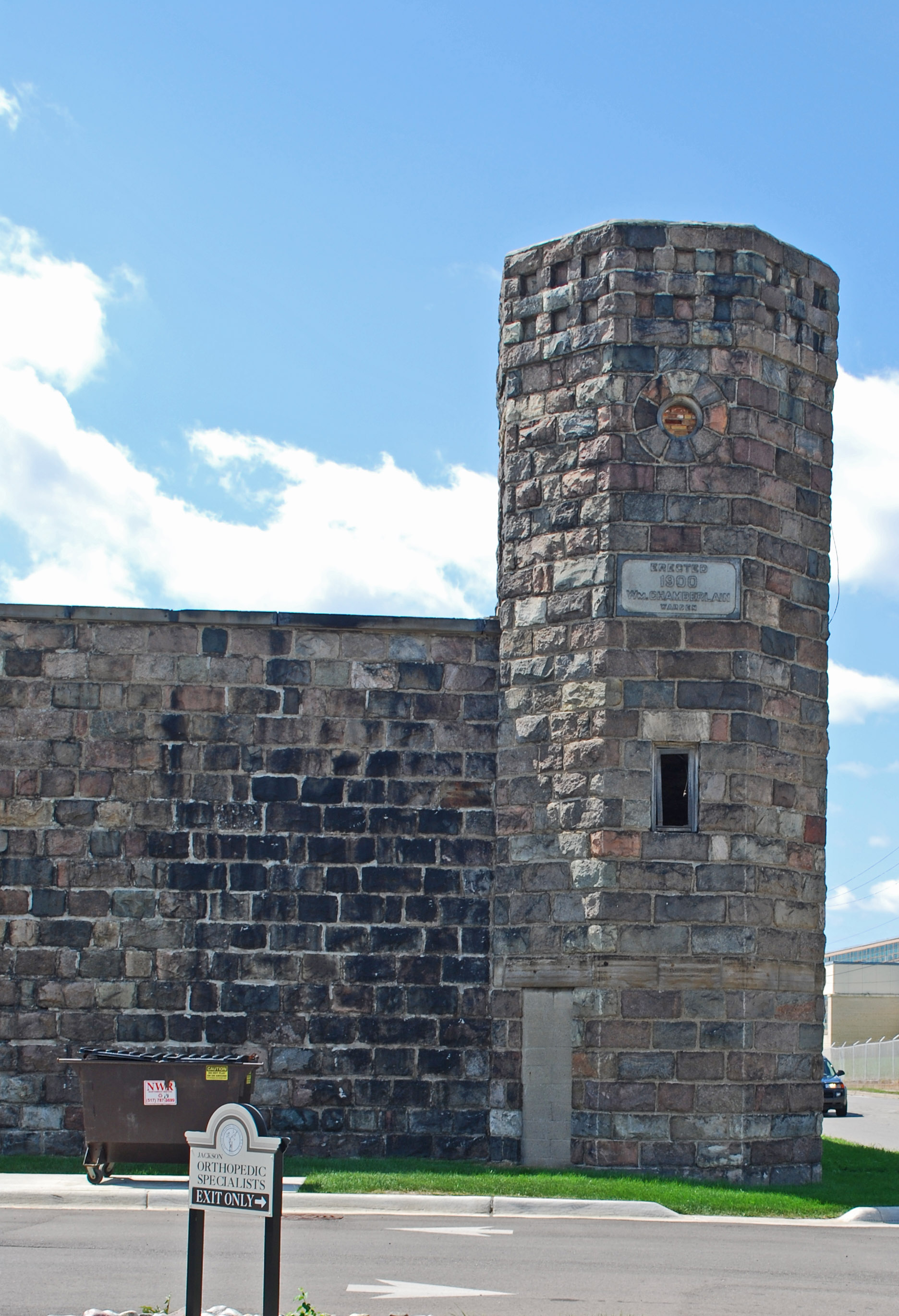
Northeast tower

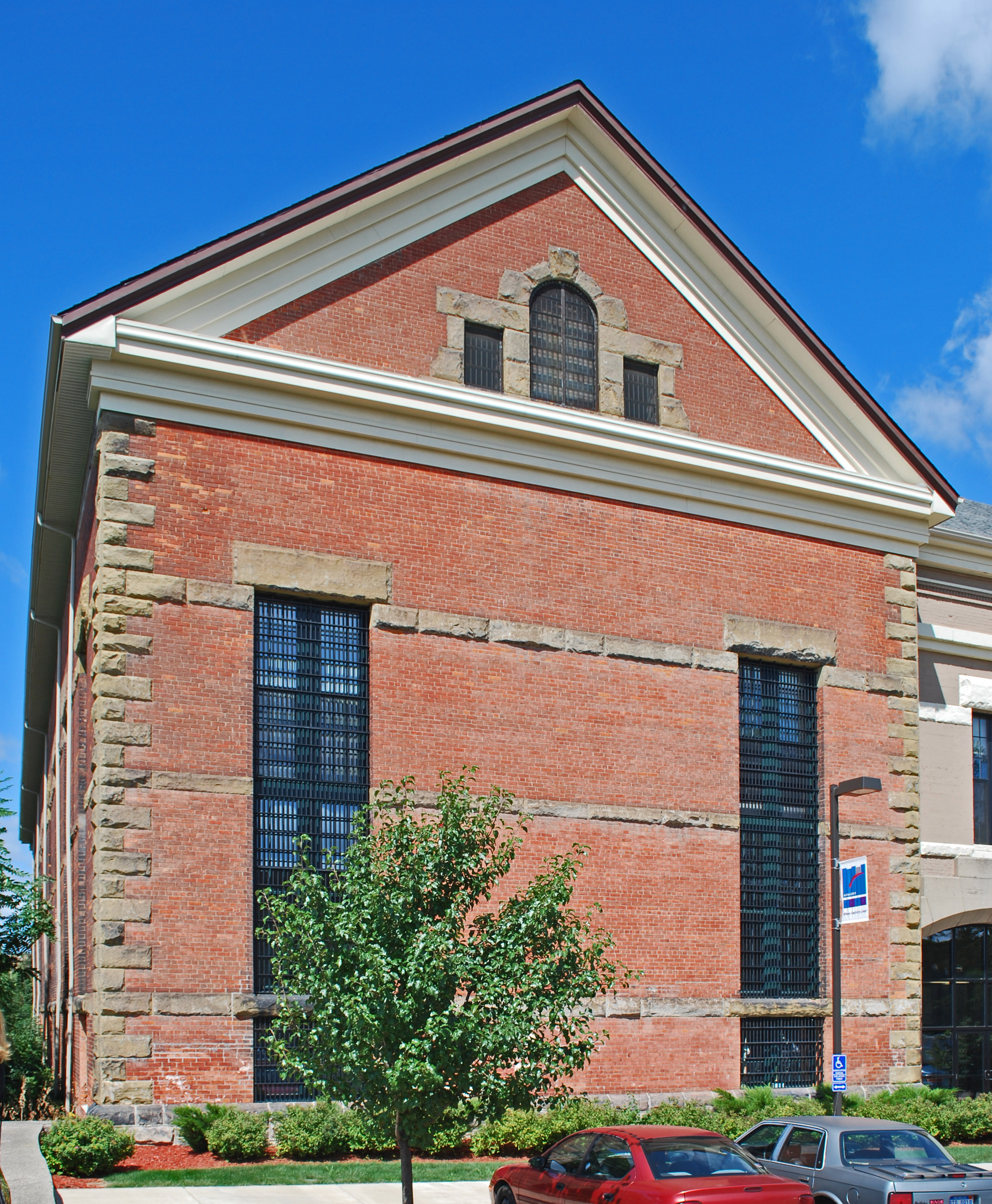

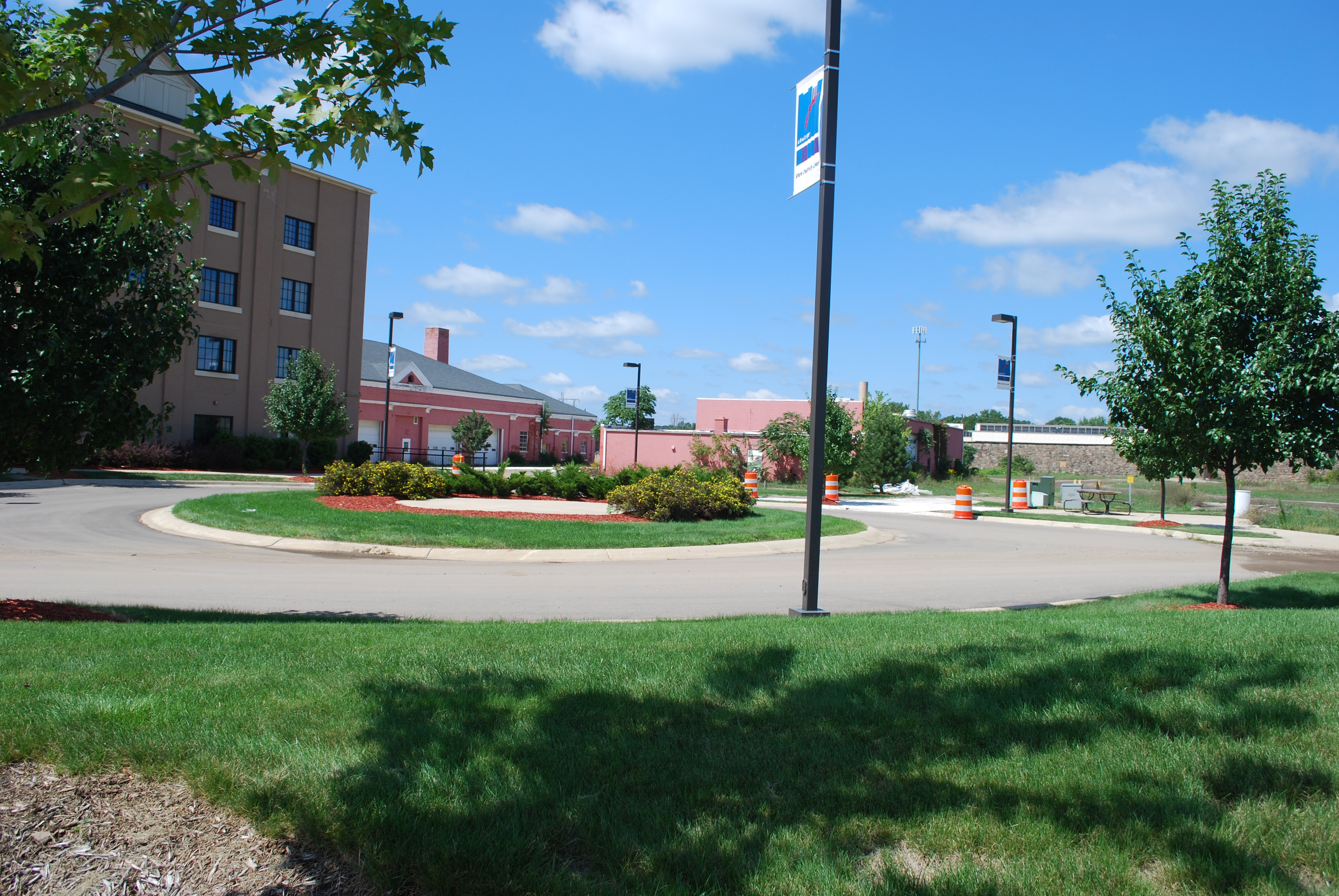

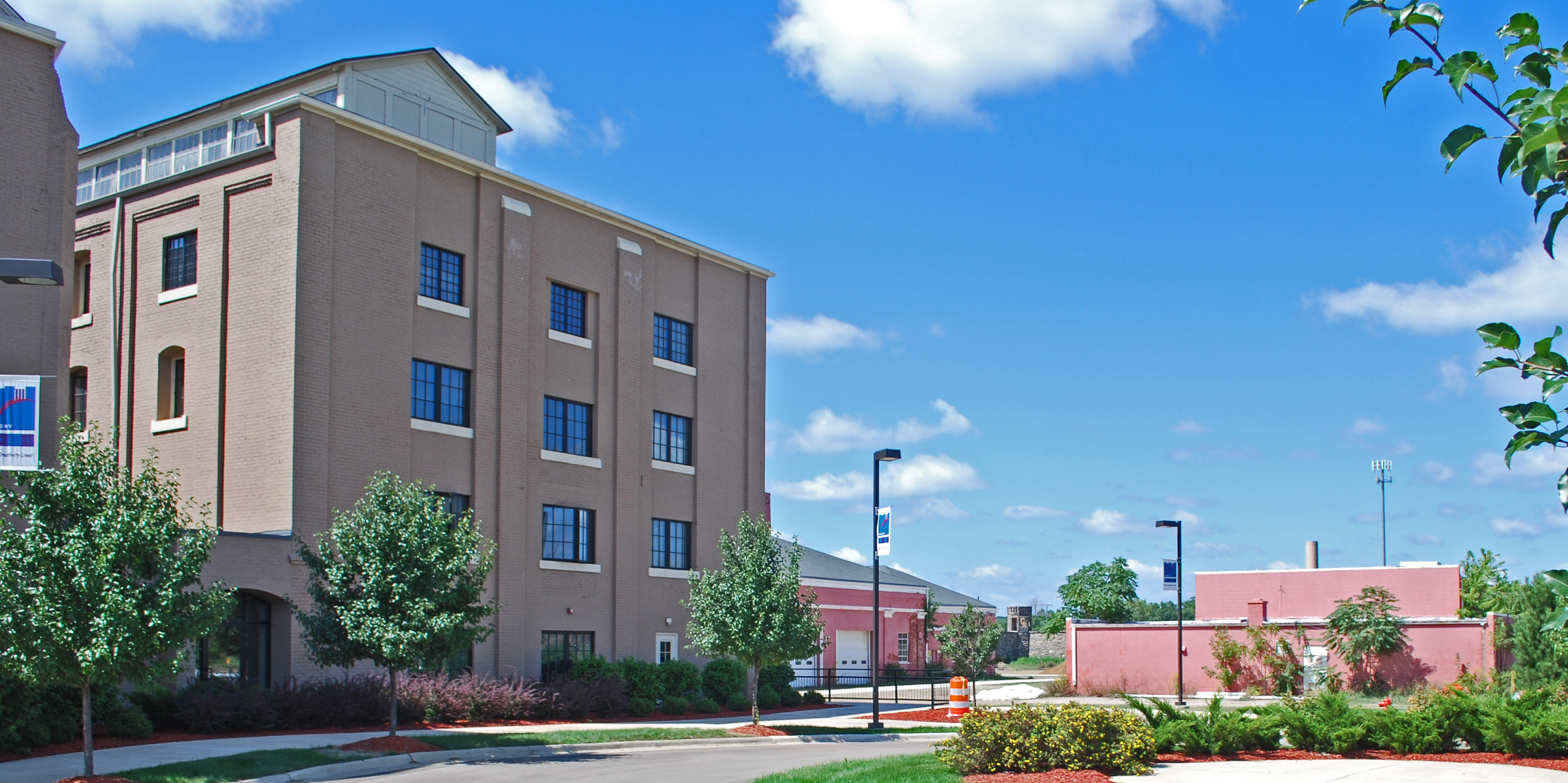
Building set; note northwest tower in background.

=== Escapes and riots at the old prison ===
During the first year after the prison was opened, 35 inmates were admitted, of whom seven managed to escape over the walls. The first mass break happened in 1840. Ten convicts overpowered two of the guards and broke free from the prison walls. They fled to Spring Arbor where they ran into a farmer, James Videto. He attempted to stop them, but the inmates took Videto's shotgun, beat him with it and left him on the road. After a few days, George Norton, the leader of the escape, was killed by another farmer. All but two of the rest of the convicts were eventually caught.

On September 1, 1911, a riot that is described by many as the worst riot in the prison's history began. The first sign of trouble was when inmates started throwing plates against the walls of the dining halls. Many fights followed after this and the riot lasted for six days. On the sixth day, the 90 or so inmates who were leading the riot were beaten and the riot eventually came to an end, but not until after the governor had called in the National Guard. A inmate was shot during the chaos. The leader and the captured men were beaten by order of the board of control.

=== The new prison ===
Despite additions to the old prison, it was evident that eventually a new prison would need to be built. In 1924, a new prison with a capacity of 5,280 inmates was built three miles (5 km) north of the city in Blackman Township. In 1926, 625 prisoners were moved from the old prison to cell block one of the new penitentiary. The name of the prison was changed to the State Prison of Southern Michigan in 1935. The new prison was built on 3,469 acres (14.04 km^{2}) with an enclosed area of 57.6 acres (233,000 m^{2}). The prison was enclosed by a concrete wall that was 33.9 feet (10.3 m) high. The wall stretched around the entire prison, with parts joined at the ends of the cell houses. There were 12 watch towers and 16 cellblocks. Inmates were housed in 2,090 inside cells, 2,072 medium security cells, 1,312 outside cells, and 268 quarantine and detention cells, for a total of 5,742 cells. All of the cells were 10 feet (3.0 m) long, by 6 feet (1.8 m) wide, by 7 1/2 feet high.

=== Riots and escapes at the new prison ===
In April 1952, two maximum-security prisoners overpowered a guard and used his keys to release the other inmates in their wing. Damaging several wings and using the canteen for food, they held nine guards hostage at knifepoint for five days. The rioters wanted Prison Warden - retired Marine Corps General, Julian N. Frisbie, to agree to a list of eleven demands and that these be published in the local newspaper, and also asked for a personal guarantee of an investigation into the complaints by the Governor of Michigan, G. Mennen Williams. In all, 2,600 inmates participated, doing $2.5 million ($30,300,000 in current currency) worth of damage. The episode came to an end when officials agreed to publication, to allow outside inspectors and not to punish the participants. However, the leaders were eventually indicted for conspiracy and the demands remained largely unmet. The 1954 film Riot in Cell Block 11 is closely based on the Jackson riot.

In 1975 inmate Dale Remling attempted a daring escape from the prison by flying out of the prison in a helicopter. Morris Colosky, a friend of Remling's, paid helicopter pilot Richard Jackson to fly him from Plymouth to Lansing. Five minutes into the flight, he pulled a knife on the pilot and told him to change his course and head towards Jackson. They flew to the prison and landed in the yard where they picked up Remling. They then flew six miles (10 km) away to where two getaway cars were located. Once on the ground, Remling sprayed mace in the pilot's eyes to disable him, but he still managed to fly the helicopter and follow one of the cars while radioing for help. The car was caught by police only a few minutes later. The original escapee got away but surrendered himself to authorities over the weekend at a bar just north of Jackson.

On May 22, 1981, prisoners assaulted and seriously injured two corrections officers in Cell Block 4. The following morning, staff requested a shakedown of the facility. The administration refused and staff initiated an unauthorized lockdown. Those prisoners that had not been secured rebelled at 10:00 in the morning. Around 800 inmates from the maximum-security block took over two of the cell blocks at the prison and set fire to many parts of the prison. Two hundred corrections officers and 165 local law enforcement officers worked to keep the riot under control. When it was finally ended without loss of life, the riot had lasted for almost 11 hours. The prison was locked down over the weekend, but once the lock down was lifted, prisoners from the North complex of the facility rioted, burning down a number of modular housing units. That disturbance was quelled in late afternoon, and the facility was locked down for two months.

As a result of the riot, two corrections officers and the deputy warden at the prison were fired. Also, fourteen corrections officers were suspended for their actions during the riot. The deputy dismissed was Willie Cason, deputy warden of the northside unit. He was dismissed because it was discovered that he had prior knowledge that the riot might happen after the earlier riot.

=== Prison Labor ===
Business leaders wanted access to low-wage labor so they pushed for Jackson to build a prison factory. As a result, the Jackson Wagon company established a facility inside the prison. This made going to and from work easy for the inmates. Inmates were paid low wages and dealt with harsh punishments if they didn’t meet the quota. Prison labor was used by other industries to make other products as well.

Restrictions of purchases on prison made goods stayed the same in the 20th century, as Michigan State industries, which hired inmates could only sell the items to state institutions and funded agencies. At the end of the 1800s, townspeople began to question the fairness of using prisoners for cheap labor. As it took jobs from ordinary workers. So a new approach was created by prisons to open their own factories. By selling goods to the market, the prison was able to cover its own expenses. Prisoners had brick and concrete work, to create more supplies for future projects. They were expanding the place where they were imprisoned.

=== 2006 controversy ===
In 2006, an inmate's death at the Southern Michigan Correctional Facility gained national attention. Timothy Joe Souders died on August 6, 2006, after spending four days in a segregation cell. Souders, who suffered from a severe mental disorder, was originally transferred to the segregation cell and placed in soft restraints on July 31 for disobeying orders. After he broke out of the soft restraints three days later, prison guards restrained him on a concrete slab. Souders went through the days being restrained in a cell lying naked in his own urine with temperatures rising higher than 100 degrees. After the incident, prison officials made a change to restraint policies so that misbehaving inmates could only be shackled for a maximum of six hours. A federal judge later said that the conditions Souders went through were "torture."

== Notable inmates ==
- GG Allin, shock rocker
- Ron LeFlore, major league baseball player
- Tee Grizzley, rapper
- Jack Kevorkian, physician and right to die proponent, activist

== See also ==
- List of Michigan state prisons
