= Charles Egeler Reception and Guidance Center =

Prison in Michigan, United States

Coordinates: 42°18′00″N 84°23′28″W

- Interactive map of Charles Egeler Reception and Guidance Center
- Location: 3855 Cooper Street Jackson, Michigan address
- Status: open
- Security class: mixed
- Capacity: 1382
- Opened: 1988
- Managed by: Michigan Department of Corrections

The Charles Egeler Reception and Guidance Center (RGC) is a state prison for men located in Blackman Charter Township, Jackson County, Michigan, owned and operated by the Michigan Department of Corrections. The facility has a Jackson postal address.

RGC houses a maximum of 1382 inmates at a mix of security levels, for the assessment, screening, and classification of all male state prisoners. RGC is adjacent to portions of the former Michigan State Prison, described as the largest walled prison in the world as late as 1981, when it was rocked by extensive, damaging riots. The prison was divided in 1988 into smaller institutions. As of 2016, Egeler and three other local components remain open as prisons:

- Parnall Correctional Facility, a minimum-security prison
- the G. Robert Cotton Correctional Facility, an educational facility
- the Cooper Street Correctional Facility, a discharge and processing facility

RGC is named after Charles Egeler, warden of the former Michigan State Prison (at the time called the State Prison of Southern Michigan), on the same site. Egeler lived from May 17, 1928, until March 6, 1977. He was hired by the Michigan Department of Corrections in 1953 and became the warden of the State Prison of Southern Michigan in 1972, the position he held until his death.
