= Darren Deon Vann =

American serial killer (born 1971)

- Lake County Sheriff's Dept. mugshot c. 2014
- Born: March 21, 1971 (age 55); Indiana, U.S.
- Other name: Donald Vann
- Height: 6 ft (1.8 m)
- Spouse: Maria Vann (m. 1995; div. 2011)
- Status: Incarcerated
- Conviction: Murder (7 counts)
- Penalty: 7 concurrent life sentences without possibility of parole

Details
- Victims: 7–18
- Span of crimes: 2013 – October 2014
- Country: United States
- States: Indiana, possibly others
- Locations: motel room in Hammond; five abandoned homes in Gary
- Weapon: Strangulation
- Date apprehended: October 18, 2014
- Imprisoned at: Wabash Valley Correctional Facility

Darren Deon Vann (born March 21, 1971) is an American serial killer. He was arrested on October 18, 2014, for the murder of 19-year-old Afrikka Hardy at a Motel 6 in Hammond, Indiana and has confessed to the murders of six other female victims in Indiana. He led police to those women's bodies, all of which were found in five abandoned structures in Gary, Indiana.

Before the police investigated the murders for which Vann was detained, Thomas Hargrove, founder of the Murder Accountability Project, together with a Gary, Indiana deputy coroner, attempted to persuade police that there were 18 similar murders pointing to a serial killer in the Gary, Indiana area.

== Background ==
Vann was born on March 21, 1971, in Indiana. He was married 16 years to Maria Vann who was about 30 years older than him. He was reportedly arrested in Gary, Indiana for threatening the life of his girlfriend. He was charged with a class D felony and spent 90 days in jail. Vann was previously convicted on September 28, 2009, in Travis County, Texas, of a sexual assault committed in Austin in 2007 and sentenced to five years in a state penitentiary, being released on July 5, 2013.

His wife, Maria Vann, filed for a divorce in August 2009 and their marriage was dissolved in 2011. He also received an "other than honorable" discharge from the United States Marine Corps in 1993 after joining in 1991.

== Suspicions ==
In August 2010, Thomas Hargrove, a reporter with the Scripps Howard news service, used an algorithm (later the basis of the Murder Accountability Project which Hargrove founded) to analyze crime data which strongly suggested a serial killer was at work in Gary, Indiana. Hargrove repeatedly urged the local authorities to investigate 15 suspicious deaths in the period 1980–2008 identified by his work.

The local authorities denied there was any evidence showing a serial killer was at work. A Gary deputy coroner, whose suspicions were also rebuffed by the local police, agreed with Hargrove and also added three suspected victims to the list.

== Arrest and investigation ==
When 19-year-old Afrikka Hardy was found strangled in a Motel 6, authorities used Hardy's phone records and located Vann. Upon apprehension, Vann was found to have possession of several key pieces of potential evidence which included Hardy's phone. During police interrogation he allegedly confessed to his involvement in Hardy's killing and told police he was involved in other killings.

His first court hearing was scheduled October 22, however he was held in contempt of court. His next hearing was held on October 28 at Lake County Jail in Crown Point where he pleaded not guilty to two charges of murder filed against him in the deaths of Afrikka Hardy and Anith Jones as well as robbery.

His trial was originally supposed to begin on June 22, 2015, but this trial date was canceled on April 17, 2015, when the request for a death sentence was filed. The trial date of June 22, 2015 was subsequently restored. Vann's attorneys requested that the trial be delayed, and the trial was again delayed to January 25, 2016. In December 2015, Lake Superior Court Judge Diane Ross Boswell recused herself from hearing the case. Judge Samuel Cappas subsequently said he would take the case. In December 2015, Vann's trial was delayed to July 25, 2016.

On March 7, 2016, Vann was charged with murder in the deaths of five additional victims. The death penalty was originally sought for each. The following day, Vann was charged with rape and attempted murder for an alleged February 2014 attack. Vann was also charged with battery by bodily waste for allegedly throwing a carton of urine and feces at a Lake County correctional officer at the jail on February 24, 2016.

In April 2016, Judge Samuel Cappas denied a motion by Vann's attorneys to sever the murder cases of Anith Jones and Afrikka Hardy, and, as a result, the capital murder trial in said cases would have continued as one. In a motion filed August 5, 2016, Vann's attorneys argued that Indiana's death penalty law is unconstitutional. In November 2016, Judge Samuel Cappas denied Vann's motion to declare the state's death penalty statute unconstitutional. In January 2017, a Lake County judge decided that Vann could make an appeal with his claims that Indiana's death penalty statute is unconstitutional.

In April 2017, the Indiana Supreme Court turned down Vann's request to look at the constitutionality of the state's death penalty statute before he went to trial. At a status hearing in April 2017, Judge Samuel Cappas set jury selection to begin the week of February 12, 2018, with the actual jury trial beginning around March 12, 2018. In October 2017, Lake Superior Court Judge Samuel Cappas delayed the trial date, with jury selection being scheduled to begin September 17, 2018, and the trial beginning October 22, 2018.

On May 4, 2018, Vann pleaded guilty to seven murders. As part of the plea agreement, prosecutors dropped the death penalty. On May 25, 2018, Vann was sentenced to seven concurrent life sentences without parole.

In August 2021, Ben Kuebrich, host of the "Algorithm" crime podcast, obtained tape recordings via FOIA requests in which Vann confesses at length to interviewing detectives about numerous unsolved murders he had committed across the country. In them, he claimed to have killed dozens of women, predominantly in Chicago, Illinois, but also in other locations such as California; North Carolina; Texas; Milwaukee, Wisconsin; Minnesota and Detroit, Michigan.

== Victims ==
Vann was convicted of murdering these seven women:

Afrikka Hardy, 19, had recently moved to Chicago after graduating from high school. She met Vann at a Motel 6 in Hammond, Indiana after he hired her through an escort agency. She was found dead in a bathtub in one of its rooms on October 17, 2014.

Anith Jones, 35, of Gary, Indiana, was last seen alive on October 8, 2014, and reported missing two days later. After Vann was arrested, he led police to an abandoned house in Gary on October 18 where her body was found.

Teaira Batey, 28, of Gary, Indiana, left to meet a friend on January 13, 2014, but she never returned. Her family waited to hear from her for a few days but reported her missing later that month. Her body was found in an abandoned house at 1800 East 19th Avenue in Gary on October 19.

Kristine Williams, 36, of Gary, Indiana, was a mother of four and employed at the time of her death. Her mother-in-law stated that she had not heard from Williams since February 2014. Her body was found in an abandoned house at 4330 Massachusetts Street in Gary on October 19.

Tracy Martin, 41, of Gary, Indiana, was reported missing on June 26, 2014. Her body was found in an abandoned house at 2200 Massachusetts Street in Gary on October 19.

Sonya Billingsley, 53, of Gary, Indiana, was reported missing on February 7, 2014. Her body was found in an abandoned house with the body of Tanya Gatlin at 413 East 43rd Avenue in Gary on October 19.

Tanya Gatlin, 27, of Gary, Indiana, had been missing since January 2014. Her body was found in an abandoned house with the body of Sonya Billingsley at 413 East 43rd Avenue in Gary on October 19.

== See also ==
- Benjamin Atkins, another serial killer of women and girls who were left dead in abandoned buildings.
- List of serial killers in the United States
