= Blackman Charter Township, Michigan =

Blackman Township, Michigan
- Charter township
- Blackman Charter Township
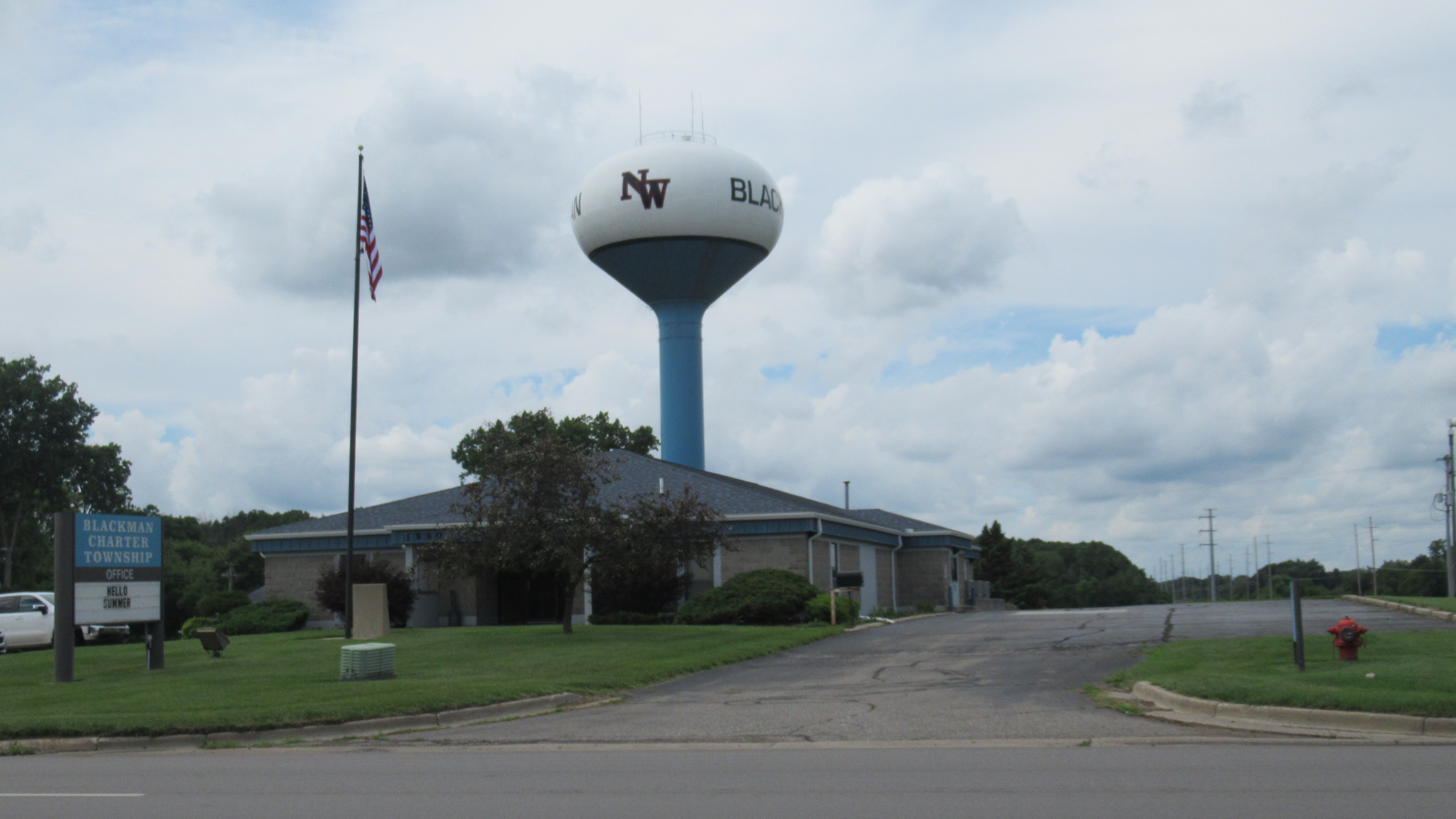
- Blackman Charter Township Office

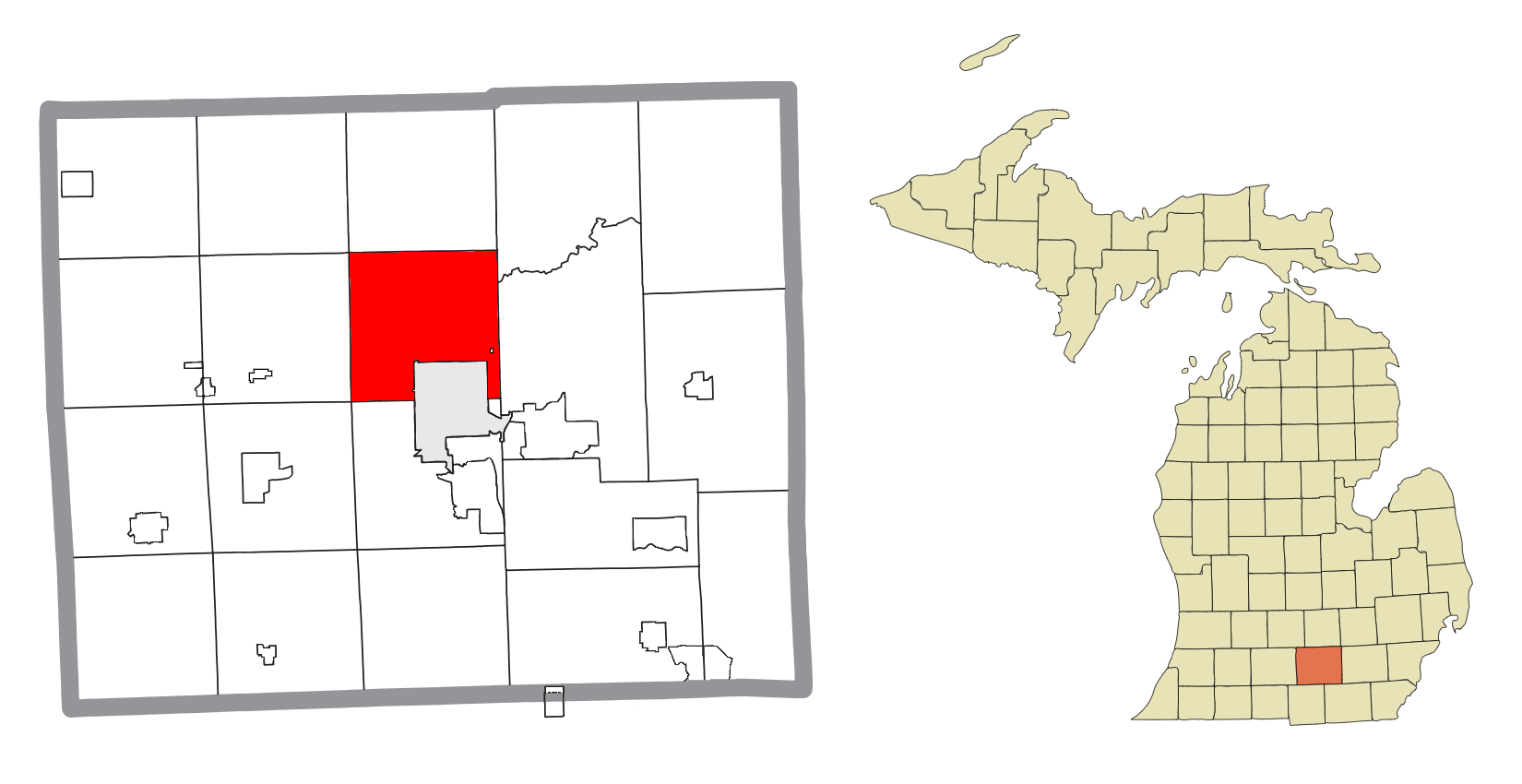
- Location within Jackson County

- Location within the state of Michigan Location within the United States
- Coordinates: 42°16′43″N 84°25′29″W
- Country: United States
- State: Michigan
- County: Jackson
- Organized: 1857

Government
  - Supervisor: Peter Jancek
  - Clerk: Shelly Sercombe

Area
  - Total: 31.90 sq mi (82.6 km^{2})
  - Land: 31.71 sq mi (82.1 km^{2})
  - Water: 0.19 sq mi (0.49 km^{2})
- Elevation: 965 ft (294 m)

Population (2020)
  - Total: 25,642
  - Density: 808.6/sq mi (312.2/km^{2})
- Time zone: UTC-5 (Eastern (EST))
  - Summer (DST): UTC-4 (EDT)
- ZIP code(s): 49201–49203 (Jackson)
- Area code: 517
- FIPS code: 26-08760
- GNIS feature ID: 1625943
- Website: Official website

Blackman Charter Township is a charter township of Jackson County in the U.S. state of Michigan. As of the 2020 census, the township population was 25,642.

The Michigan State Prison was partly located within the township. Four smaller state institutions currently occupy the former state prison grounds within the township. The township is also the junction of four major highways: Interstate 94, M-50, M-60 and U.S. Route 127.

== Geography ==
According to the United States Census Bureau, the township has a total area of 31.90 square miles (82.62 km^{2}), of which 31.71 square miles (82.13 km^{2}) is land and 0.19 square miles (0.49 km^{2}) (0.60%) is water.

Blackman Charter Township is in central Jackson County and is bordered to the south by the city of Jackson, the county seat. Ann Arbor is 35 miles (56 km) to the east, and Battle Creek is 40 miles (64 km) to the west, both by Interstate 94. Lansing, the state capital, is 35 miles (56 km) to the north via US-127.

It encompasses most of the survey township T2S R1W. The township is drained by the Grand River, which flows from south to north through the township center, and its tributaries.

Rod Mills Park is located in Blackman Township and includes hiking trails, baseball diamonds, soccer fields, a playground area, picnic tables and grills.

== Demographics ==
As of the census of 2000, there were 22,800 people, 6,658 households, and 4,187 families residing in the township. The population density was 716.6 inhabitants per square mile (276.7/km^{2}). There were 6,921 housing units at an average density of 217.5 per square mile (84.0/km^{2}). The racial makeup of the township was 79.46% White, 17.24% African American, 0.38% Native American, 0.57% Asian, 0.02% Pacific Islander, 1.10% from other races, and 1.23% from two or more races. Hispanic or Latino of any race were 2.47% of the population.

There were 6,658 households, out of which 28.9% had children under the age of 18 living with them, 47.7% were married couples living together, 11.0% had a female householder with no husband present, and 37.1% were non-families. 31.0% of all households were made up of individuals, and 13.6% had someone living alone who was 65 years of age or older. The average household size was 2.33 and the average family size was 2.91.

In the township the population was spread out, with 16.7% under the age of 18, 9.0% from 18 to 24, 39.2% from 25 to 44, 22.0% from 45 to 64, and 13.1% who were 65 years of age or older. The median age was 38 years. For every 100 females, there were 172.0 males. For every 100 females age 18 and over, there were 191.2 males.

The median income for a household in the township was $40,286, and the median income for a family was $47,966. Males had a median income of $36,482 versus $26,795 for females. The per capita income for the township was $18,708. About 4.3% of families and 6.6% of the population were below the poverty line, including 7.8% of those under age 18 and 5.9% of those age 65 or over.

== Government and infrastructure ==
The Michigan Department of Corrections operates several correctional facilities in the township. They include the Cooper Street Correctional Facility, the Cotton Correctional Facility, the Charles Egeler Reception & Guidance Center (reception center for new male prisoners), and the Parnall Correctional Facility.

Michigan State Prison moved to Blackman Charter Township in the 1930s.

The Southern Michigan Correctional Facility was formerly in the township.

== Education ==
The majority of the township is in the Northwest Community Schools. Other portions of the township are in East Jackson Community Schools, Jackson Public Schools, and Western School District.

== Culture ==
Cell Block 7 Prison Museum is located in the township.
