= National Association of Fire Investigators =

The National Association of Fire Investigators (NAFI) is a professional association of people who investigate cases of fire and arson. It was created in 1961 and is located in Bradenton, Florida. The purpose of the group is to increase knowledge and improve skills of fire investigators in the field and in relation to the litigation involved in determining the origin and cause of fires.

NAFI offers three certifications for its members through its own International Certification Board. The National Fire Protection Association's guide to fire investigation, known as NFPA 921 recognizes the certifications awarded by NAFI. Through NAFI, members can become a Certified Fire and Explosion Investigator (CFEI), a Certified Fire Investigation Instructor (CFII), or a Certified Vehicle Fire Investigator (CVFI).
