= NFPA 921 =

Document used in fire and explosion investigations

NFPA 921, "Guide for Fire and Explosion Investigations", is a peer reviewed document that is published by the National Fire Protection Association (NFPA). Its purpose is "to establish guidelines and recommendations for the safe and systematic investigation or analysis of fire and explosion incidents" (section 1.2.1). Familiarity with NFPA 921 is strongly recommended by National Association of Fire Investigators and the International Association of Arson Investigators (IAAI). NFPA 921 forms a large basis of the information which a professional fire investigator must know to pass the various Fire Investigator Certification (NAFI and IAAI) examinations.

While not every recommendation in NFPA 921 will apply to any particular fire or explosion investigation, the document itself recommends that if a particular fire investigator does not apply certain sections to an investigation where they are called-for, the investigator must be prepared to justify the exclusion. This requirement underscores the importance of a thoughtful and deliberate approach to each investigation, ensuring that deviations from the guide are well-reasoned and based on the specific context of the incident.

This standard was long resisted in legal circles, with civil and criminal arson investigations leading to convictions later proven wrongful.

== See also ==
- Fire investigation
- National Fire Protection Association (NFPA)
- Kirk's Fire Investigation
