= Paul L. Kirk =

American chemist

- Born: May 9, 1902; Colorado Springs, Colorado
- Died: June 5, 1970 (aged 68); Alameda, California
- Occupations: Chemist, forensic scientist

Paul Leland Kirk (May 9, 1902 – June 5, 1970) was a biochemist, criminalist and participant in the Manhattan Project who was specialized in microscopy. He also investigated the bedroom in which Sam Sheppard supposedly murdered his wife and provided the key blood spatter evidence that led to his acquittal in a retrial over 12 years after the murder. The highest honor one can receive in the criminalistics section of the American Academy of Forensic Sciences carries Kirk's name.

== Education ==
Kirk received his bachelor's degree in chemistry from Ohio State University and got his master's degree in chemistry from the University of Pittsburgh. He went on to receive a Ph.D. in biochemistry from UC Berkeley.

== Career ==
In 1929 Kirk became professor of biochemistry at UC Berkeley. According to Kirk, he first became interested in forensic science in his early days as a teacher after a student asked if it could be determined if a dog had died of poisoning. Forensic science permanently piqued his interest when authorities asked him to do a microscopic examination of a rape victim's clothing. He found fibers from the attacker's shirt and this evidence resulted in a conviction. In 1937, Kirk became leader of UC Berkeley's criminology program. Due to his extensive experience in microscopy, Kirk was asked to join the Manhattan Project where he worked on the process to isolate fissionable plutonium from 1942 to 1945. When he returned to Berkeley, he created a major in technical criminology and when August Vollmer established the UC School of Criminology, Kirk was appointed to chair the criminalistics department.

Kirk was also an avid supporter of Locard's exchange principle. As a result of his detailed descriptions of the principle, Kirk's words have repeatedly been mistaken for those of Edmond Locard himself. Unlike others before him, Kirk understood the limits of the principle and argued for caution in the interpretation of exchange evidence.

Kirk is best known for his work in the Sam Sheppard case. On January 22, 1955 – one month after Sheppard's conviction – Kirk visited the scene of the crime after which he wrote an extensive report primarily based on bloodstain pattern analysis. A motion for a retrial had been denied in 1955, but this decision was overturned in 1964 and in 1966, the Supreme Court upheld the decision for a retrial. Later that same year, Kirk testified at the retrial, which led to Sheppard's acquittal. Kirk's testimony embarrassed Samuel Gerber, a senior member of the American Academy of Forensic Sciences (AAFS) who was working for the prosecution and believed in Sheppard's guilt. Kirk was denied AAFS membership, but he still left his mark on the organization. The highest honor awarded in the criminalistics section of the AAFS is the Paul L. Kirk Award.

Dr. Kirk's photographs, analysis, and testimony from the Sam Sheppard case can be seen at http://engagedscholarship.csuohio.edu/kirk_photos/index.2.html.

== Bibliography ==
Not only did Kirk publish around 250 articles in multiple fields of research ranging from biochemistry to criminalistics, he also contributed articles to the Encyclopædia Britannica, and he was the author of the following books:

- Quantitative Ultramicroanalysis (1950)
- Density and Refrective Index: Their Applications in Criminal Identification (1951)
- Crime Investigation: Physical Evidence and the Police Laboratory Interscience (1953)
- Fire Investigation (1969)
- The Crime Laboratory (1965), co-written with Lowell W. Bradford
