= Chicago Strangler =

Unidentified American serial killer(s)

Details
- Victims: 51–76
- Span of crimes: 2001–2018
- Country: United States
- State: Illinois

The Chicago Strangler is a suspected serial killer, or group of killers, believed by some to be responsible for the deaths of women in Chicago, Illinois. The Murder Accountability Project has identified 51 strangulation and asphyxiation deaths in the city between 2001 and 2018. Most of the victims were Black women, and many of the bodies were found on the city’s South and West Sides.

The Murder Accountability Project has said that similarities between the victims, the causes of death and the locations suggest that some of the cases may be linked. Following pressure from activists, the Chicago Police Department agreed to review the cases, but said it had found no evidence that a serial killer was involved. In December 2025, Arthur Hilliard was convicted of murdering Diamond Turner, one of the women on the project’s list.

== Connection of crimes ==
Since 2001, at least 51 women aged 18 to 58 have been killed by strangulation or asphyxiation in Chicago, with many cases remaining unsolved. The victims were predominantly Black, typically employed as sex workers, and often had criminal records. Nearly all were strangled, partially or fully stripped, and then left in abandoned buildings, alleys, garbage bins, parks or snowdrifts. 25 additional cases were closed by police, resulting in the arrest of 13 men.

Several of the strangulations were committed in just three police districts located on the South and West sides of Chicago: areas with histories of violent crime and drug use such as Washington Park and Garfield Park have been common locations for these murders to occur. This pattern was recognized in 2018 through the Murder Accountability Project (MAP), which reviewed 51 unsolved strangulation and asphyxiation cases dating as far back as 2001. The algorithm used by MAP sorts unsolved homicides by location, victim and killing method in order to identify clusters associated with low homicide clearance rates. According to MAP, these factors could be indicative of an active serial killer.

== Police response ==
Following pressure from activists, the Chicago Police Department (CPD) announced the review of 51 unsolved murders of women. The CPD have said that there was no evidence that a serial killer was responsible for any of the 51 killings.

== Victims ==
Below is a list of the 51 unsolved strangulations of women in Chicago committed between 2001 and 2018, compiled by the Murder Accountability Project through FBI data and news sources.

Date discovered	Victim's name	Age	Race
January 4, 2001	Angela Ford	32	Black
March 28, 2001	Charlotte Day	42	Black
August 2, 2001	Winifred Shines	33	Black
August 22, 2001	Brenda Cowart	52	Black
November 5, 2001	Elaine Boneta	41	White
December 8, 2001	Saudia Banks	39	Black
February 16, 2002	Bessie Scott	43	Black
June 12, 2002	Gwendolyn Williams	44	Black
August 14, 2002	Jody Grissom	20	White
August 25, 2002	Loraine Harris	36	White
September 7, 2002	Dellie Jones	33	Black
December 20, 2002	Celeste Jackson	37	Black
March 19, 2003	Nancy Walker	55	Black
May 20, 2003	Linda Green	42	Black
May 20, 2003	Tarika Jones	30	Black
August 14, 2003	Rosenda Barocio	20	White
August 16, 2003	LaTonya Keeler	29	Black
October 15, 2003	Latricia Hall	21	Black
October 15, 2003	Lucyset Thomas	38	Black
December 26, 2003	Ethel Amerson	36	Black
July 15, 2004	Michelle Davenport	40	Black
October 16, 2004	Tamala Edwards	37	Black
November 5, 2004	Makalavah Williams	18	Black
January 13, 2005	Precious Smith	23	Black
February 1, 2005	Denise Torres	35	White
August 30, 2005	Wanda Hall	33	Black
December 25, 2005	Yvette Mason	35	Black
December 30, 2005	Shaniqua Williams	40	Black
January 12, 2006	Margaret Gomez	22	White
July 14, 2006	Antoinette Simmons	21	Black
September 24, 2006	Kelly Sarff	34	White
March 25, 2007	Veronica Fraizer	46	Black
May 2, 2007	Mary Ann Szatkowski	56	White
November 13, 2007	Theresa Bunn	21	Black
November 14, 2007	Hazel Lewis	52	Black
October 9, 2008	Genevieve Mellas	32	White
June 13, 2009	Charlene Miller	54	Black
July 5, 2009	LaToya Banks	29	Black
August 6, 2009	Shannon Williams	36	Black
December 9, 2009	Vanessa Rajokovich	32	White
June 25, 2010	Lafonda Wilson	43	Black
July 16, 2010	Quanda Crider	37	Black
August 28, 2011	Angela Profit	46	Black
August 9, 2012	Pamela Wilson	30	Black
February 21, 2014	Velma Howard	50	Black
March 3, 2017	Diamond Turner	21	Black
June 22, 2017	Catherine Saterfield-Buchanan	58	Black
March 17, 2018	Valerie Jackson	49	Black
May 25, 2018	Lora Harbin	44	White
June 12, 2018	Nicole Ridge	47	White
September 10, 2018	Reo Holyfield	34	Black

== Convictions ==
In 2020, a man named Arthur Hilliard was charged with the murder of 21-year-old Diamond Turner after his DNA linked him to the crime. He was convicted of her homicide in December 2025, and is currently awaiting sentencing. He was also convicted of concealing a body in an unrelated 2018 murder, and is a suspect in yet another murder with which he is yet to be charged.

== See also ==
- List of homicides in Illinois
- List of fugitives from justice who disappeared
