= Fire investigation =

Analysis of fire-related incidents

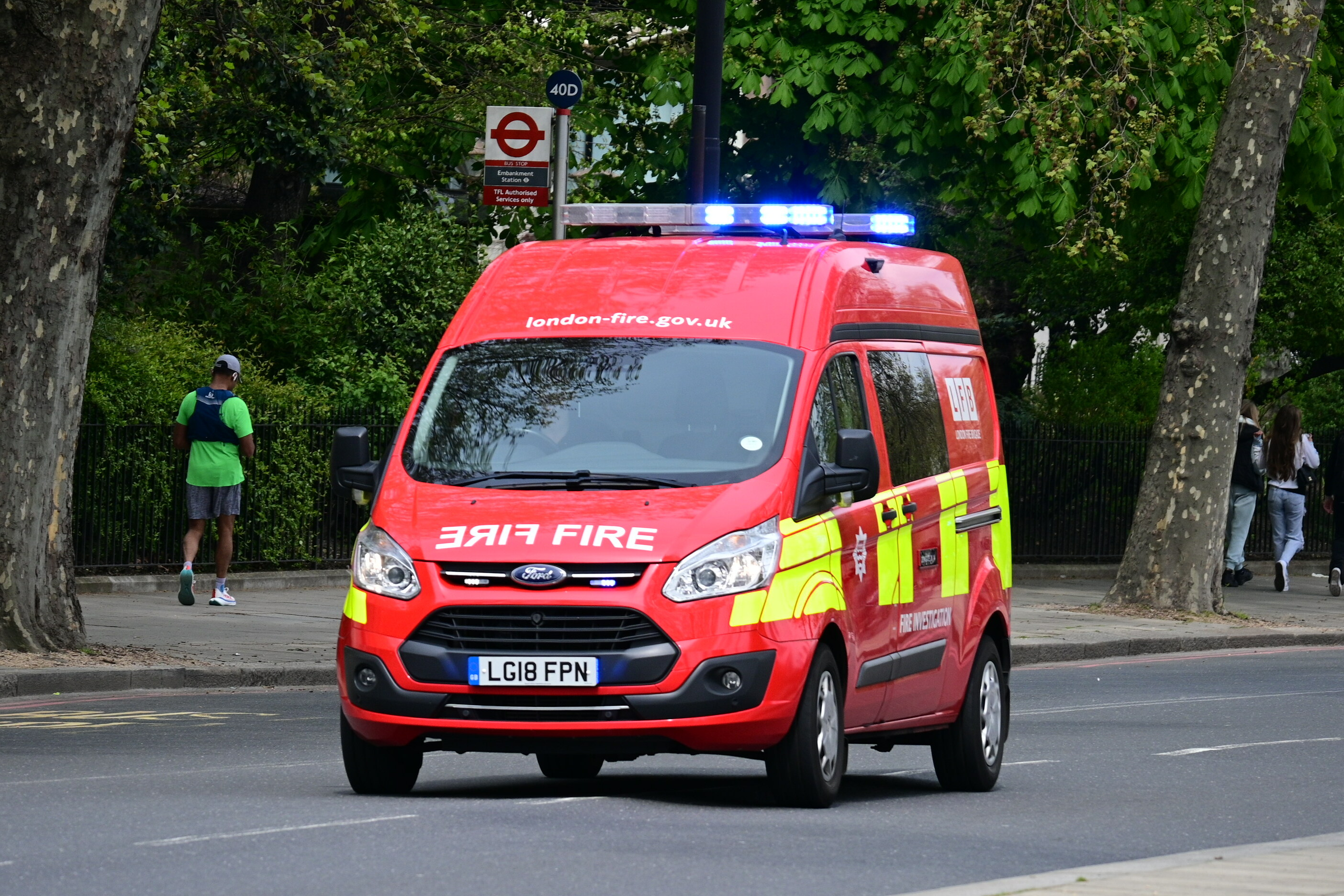
London Fire Brigade Fire Investigation Unit responding on the Victoria Embankment, 2023

Fire investigation (sometimes referred to as origin and cause investigation) is the analysis of fire-related incidents. After firefighters extinguish a fire, an investigation is launched to determine the origin and cause of the fire or explosion. These investigations can occur in two stages. The first stage is an investigation of the scene of the fire to establish its origin and cause. The second step is to conduct laboratory examination on the retrieved samples. Investigations of such incidents require a systematic approach and knowledge of fire science.

== Investigating fires ==
The difficulty of determining whether arson has occurred arises because fire often destroys the key evidence of its origin. Many fires are caused by defective equipment, such as shorting of faulty electrical circuits. Car fires can be caused by faulty fuel lines, and spontaneous combustion is possible where organic wastes are stored. A fire investigator looks at the fire remains, and obtains information to reconstruct the sequence of events leading up to the fire.

One of the challenging aspects of fire investigation is the multi-disciplinary basis of the investigator's job. As fires can be caused by or involve many ignition sources and fuels, an individual with expertise in fire chemistry should investigate the incident. For example, if there is a gas appliance at the origin of the fire, an investigator should know enough about appliances to either include or exclude it as a possible cause of the fire. Fire investigators sometimes work with forensic engineers, such as forensic electrical engineers when examining electrical appliances, household wiring, etc.

In the United States, fire investigators often refer to NFPA 921: Guide for Fire and Explosion Investigations (National Fire Protection Association). Also, Kirk's Fire Investigation by David J. Icove and Gerald A. Haynes has long been regarded as the primary textbook in the field of fire investigation.

== Conducting investigations ==
The main steps of a fire investigation include:

1. Arrive at the scene
  1. Ensure safety of crime scene
  2. Secure the area
2. Investigate the scene
  1. Evaluate external structure
  2. Evaluate interior structure
  3. Determine point of origin
3. Document the evidence
  1. Sample and tag evidence
  2. Sketch the scene and damage
  3. Photograph evidence
4. Conclude the investigation
  1. Finish necessary documents/reports
  2. Interview necessary parties
  3. Present evidence

Fire investigators conduct their investigations using a systematic approach utilizing the scientific method, including the following: When arsonists attack, there is very rarely much evidence left at the scene. However, arsonists usually use accelerants to speed up a blaze. Forensic scientists use technologies to heat samples taken from the scene causing any residue to separate. This sample is then analyzed to determine the chemical structure. Scientists also use other tests such as using liquid nitrogen gas to trap residue which are then analyzed using gas chromatography. The investigator:

- Receives the assignment and responsibilities
- Plans the investigation and assembles tools, equipment, and personnel
- Examines the scene and collects data
- Collects, tests, evaluates, and documents evidence
- Applies the scientific method to analyze the information obtained

Depending on how much evidence is present, an investigator can use different approaches. Two techniques include process of elimination, or disregarding the causes that the evidence deems not possible. The second is to start investigating the most probable cause first until it is ruled unlikely.

Fire scene reconstruction is critical to understanding complicated fires. When normal approaches fail, laboratory reconstructions become critical. They contribute to the resolution of critical issues and the enhancement of fire safety. A reconstruction's objective, whether it is a test, experiment, or demonstration, must be clearly stated. Various tests, ranging from small-scale to full-scale, help to understand fire behaviour. Clear agreements on size, safety, and data are required before proceeding. Specialist laboratories play an important role in increasing fire safety knowledge.

== Spoliation ==
Spoliation is the destruction or alteration of evidence through intention or ignorance. The mere act of extinguishing a fire can destroy potential evidence of arson or what is also known as an "incendiary fire". Firefighters are educated that the stream of their fire hose or the use of a pike pole can destroy evidence and efforts are made to do what is required to extinguish the fire, while not destroying clues to the fire's origin. By taking steps before the investigation starts, destruction of evidence can be avoided. Investigators are encouraged to set barriers and secure the area. This allows for control to be taken over the crime scene and limits the chance of an investigation being compromised. Investigators then document any evidence seen at the crime scene or on the victims (clothes, burns, etc.). While looking for evidence, any findings that impose a threat to evidence, such as excessive use of fire-suppressing chemicals, unusual movement of handles/knobs, and changed position of evidence should be reported.

== Qualification ==
Investigators can receive additional certification to prove their fire investigating skills. The National Fire Protection Association (NFPA), through a document known as NFPA 1033, Standard for Professional Requirements for Fire Investigator, publishes minimum requirements for the knowledge skills and ability of a fire investigator. Principal among these is a 16-point list of areas in which a fire investigator is required to have education beyond high school level. The list mentions points such as using protective equipment, fire ignition, heat science, explosions, working with chemicals, investigating fires, using related technology, and reporting evidence. These guidelines are recommended practice but are not required by law.

Fire scene investigators may become certified through the National Association of Fire Investigators (NAFI) or the International Association of Arson Investigators (IAAI). Both certification programs rely heavily on the content of NFPA 1033 and NFPA 921. Both also require an application process detailing the investigator's education, training, and experience, and successfully challenging a written examination. Certificates are valid for a period of 5 years, at which time an investigator must demonstrate continued participation in the field and a minimum amount of continuing education in order to be recertified.

The National Association of Fire Investigators (NAFI), a professional association of fire and explosion investigators, offer several National Board Certified fire investigation certifications including:

1. Certified Fire and Explosion Investigator (CFEI),
2. Certified Vehicle Fire Investigator (CVFI), and
3. Certified Fire Investigation Instructor (CFII).

The International Association of Arson Investigators (IAAI), a professional group of fire investigators, grants the following certifications:

1. Certified Fire Investigator (IAAI-CFI) – certified by the ProBoard Fire Service Professional Qualifications System.
2. Fire Investigation Technician (IAAI-FIT)
3. Certified Instructor (IAAI-CI)
4. Evidence Collection Technician (IAAI-ECT)

== See also ==
- Arson
- ATF Fire Research Laboratory
- Fire marshal
- Fire protection engineer
- Kirk's Fire Investigation
- Women in firefighting

== Footnotes ==
=== General references ===
- National Fire Protection Association (2004). NFPA 921: Guide for Fire and Explosion Investigations (2004 ed.). National Fire Protection Association. ISBN 0-00-653937-8.https://www.einvestigator.com/arson-investigations/
- https://www.atascientific.com.au/technologies-forensic-sciences/
