= Murder Accountability Project =

US non-profit organization

- Abbreviation: MAP
- Formation: May 31, 2015
- Type: Nonprofit organization
- Purpose: To improve the accounting of unsolved homicides, assist law enforcement in clearing the nation's cold-case backlog and educate the public about the growing problem of unsolved murder.
- Headquarters: Alexandria, Virginia
- Chairman: Thomas K. Hargrove
- Vice Chair: William Hagmaier
- Treasurer: Holly Lang
- Secretary: Enzo Yaksic
- Board of directors: Michael Arntfield, Elizabeth Goeckel, Bruce E. Harry, David Icove and Isaac Wolf
- Key people: Thomas R. Burke, JD
- Staff: All volunteer
- Website: www.murderdata.org

Murder Accountability Project (MAP) is a nonprofit organization which disseminates information about homicides, especially unsolved killings and serial murders committed in the United States. MAP was established in 2015 by a group of retired detectives, investigative journalists, homicide scholars, and a forensic psychiatrist.

MAP has assembled records on most criminal fatalities, including case-level details on many thousands of homicides that local police failed to report to the Federal Bureau of Investigation's voluntary Uniform Crime Report program. At its website, the group also provides access to an interactive computer algorithm that has identified homicides committed by known serial killers and suspicious clusters of murders that might contain serial killings.

MAP is an outgrowth of a 2010 national reporting project led by Scripps Howard News Service reporter Thomas Hargrove, who wanted to know if FBI computer files could be used to detect previously unrecognized serial killings. The project took first place in the 2011 Philip Meyer Journalism Award offered by the National Institute of Computer Assisted Reporting for outstanding journalism using social science techniques.

Hargrove developed an algorithm that organizes homicide reports into groups based on the victims' gender, geographic location, and means of death. The algorithm searches for murder clusters with extremely low clearance rates. The algorithm's identification of 15 unsolved strangulations in Gary, Indiana, was validated with the October 18, 2014, arrest of Darren Deon Vann by the Hammond Police Department. Vann confessed to multiple homicides and took police to abandoned properties in Gary, where the bodies of six previously unknown female victims were recovered.

MAP personnel warned police and local journalists about larger clusters of suspicious female homicides committed in Cleveland and Chicago. The Cleveland Police Department assembled a small task force to review the area's unsolved homicides following release of the group's analysis. Chicago Police Department officials told reporters it had found no evidence of serial murders in a wave of unsolved female strangulations committed since 2001.

MAP filed a Freedom of Information Act lawsuit against the Illinois State Police on December 3, 2015, to compel the state to release homicide data it "no longer reports to the FBI's Uniform Crime Report and Supplementary Homicide Report." The case was settled when Illinois agreed to release data on hundreds of cases it had not provided to the federal government. After determining Illinois State Police were not counting how often Illinois police solve homicides through arrest, MAP sent Freedom of Information Act data requests to 102 Illinois law enforcement agencies and determined the state suffered the lowest clearance rate in the nation in 2015.

The MAP Board of Directors includes: William Hagmaier, a retired FBI special agent and former chief of the National Center for the Analysis of Violent Crime, Enzo Yaksic, director of the Northeastern University Atypical Homicide Research Group, and Michael Arntfield, a professor at the University of Western Ontario, where he runs a cold-case society.
