= Kirk's Fire Investigation =

Book by Gerald A. Haynes

Kirk's Fire Investigation by David J. Icove and Gerald A. Haynes has long been regarded as the primary textbook in the field of fire investigation. It is currently in its 8th edition (published in 2017, ISBN 978-0134237923).

The book is now in close accordance to the 2017 Edition of NFPA 921, Guide for Fire and Explosion Investigation; the 2014 Edition of NFPA 1033, Standard for Professional Guidelines for Fire Investigators; and the model curriculum of the Fire Emergency Service Higher Education (FESHE).

The title refers to Paul Leland Kirk (1902–1970), the author of the original text Fire Investigation that was the basis for Kirk's Fire Investigation. "Kirk's Fire Investigation," a seminal guide that continues to serve as an essential resource for fire investigators around the globe, reflecting the ongoing relevance of Kirk's foundational insights and methodologies in the field.
