= International Association of Arson Investigators =

International association

The International Association of Arson Investigators (IAAI) is a professional association of individuals who conduct fire investigations. The IAAI provides resources for training, research, and technology for fire investigators around the world. It is based in Forest Hill, Maryland, United States.

This organization was formed and chartered as a nonprofit organization in Louisville Kentucky. President George Parker, based on the wishes of the membership, filed the request for incorporation in the latter part of 1949 The IAAI received its charter December 4, 1951.

== See also ==
- National Association of Fire Investigators
