= Cooper Street Correctional Facility =

State prison in Jackson, Michigan, US

Coordinates: 42°17′42″N 84°23′54″W

- Interactive map of Cooper Street Correctional Facility
- Location: 3100 Cooper Street Jackson, Michigan address
- Status: open
- Security class: minimum
- Capacity: 1752
- Opened: July 1997
- Managed by: Michigan Department of Corrections

The Cooper Street Correctional Facility is a minimum-security state prison for men located in Blackman Charter Township, Jackson County, Michigan, owned and operated by the Michigan Department of Corrections. It has a Jackson postal address.

The facility was created from the former grounds of the Michigan Parole Camp, which was across the street from the former Michigan State Prison. The prison opened in 1997 and holds 814 inmates at a minimum security level, as the common point for processing of all male state prisoners about to be discharged, paroled, or transferred.
