= List of chiefs of the Detroit Police Department =

The chief of the Detroit Police Department serves as head of the police force in the American city of Detroit. The position has had several titles over the course of its history.

== List of chiefs ==
Order	Name	Tenure start	Tenure end	Mayor(s) served under	Notes	Ref.
1st	Frank C. Andrews	May 4, 1901	February 10, 1902	William C. Maybury		
2nd	George W. Fowle	February 11, 1902	June 20, 1905	William C. Maybury; George P. Codd		
3rd	John B. Whelan	July 1, 1905	May 14, 1906			
4th	Fred W. Smith	March 14, 1906	June 30, 1909			
5th	Frank H. Croul	July 1, 1909	May 17, 1913			
6th	John Gillespie	May 17, 1913	September 30, 1916			
7th	James Couzens	September 30, 1916	July 5, 1918			
8th	Ernst Marquardt	July 5, 1918	January 14, 1919			
9th	James Woffendale Inches	January 14, 1919	February 3, 1923	James Couzens, John C. Lodge		
(5th)	Frank H. Croul	February 3, 1923	July 15, 1926	John C. Lodge, Frank Ellsworth Doremus, Joseph A. Martin, John C. Lodge, John W. Smith	Previously served from 1909–1913	
10th	William P. Rutledge	July 15, 1926	January 21, 1930	John W. Smith, John C. Lodge, Charles Bowles		
11th	Harold H. Emmons	January 21, 1930	March 21, 1930	Charles Bowles		
12th	Thomas C. Wilcox	May 21, 1930	January 9, 1931	Charles Bowles; Frank Murphy		
13th	James K. Watkins	January 10, 1931	August 14, 1933	Frank Murphy; Frank Couzens		
14th	John P. Smith	August 15, 1933	March 31, 1934	Frank Couzens, John W. Smith		
15th	Heinrich A. Pickert	April 1, 1934	January 1, 1940	Frank Couzens, Richard Reading		
16th	Frank D. Eaman	January 2, 1940	June 1, 1942	Edward Jeffries		
17th	John H. Witherspoon	June 1, 1942	December 31, 1943	Edward Jeffries		
18th	John F. Ballenger	January 1, 1944	January 1, 1948	Edward Jeffries		
19th	Harry S. Toy	January 1, 1948	January 2, 1950	Edward Jeffries, Eugene Van Antwerp		
20th	George F. Boos	January 2, 1950	September 30, 1952	Eugene Van Antwerp, Albert Cobo		
21st	Donald S. Leonard	October 1, 1952	June 4, 1954	Albert Cobo		
22nd	Edward S. Piggins	June 5, 1954	September 1, 1958	Albert Cobo, Louis Miriani		
23rd	Herbert W. Hart	September 2, 1958	January 2, 1962	Louis Miriani		
24th	George Clifton Edwards Jr.	January 2, 1962	December 19, 1963	Jerome Cavanagh		
25th	Ray Girardin	December 19, 1963	July 21, 1968	Jerome Cavanagh		
26th	Johannes Spreen	July 22, 1968	January 5, 1970	Jerome Cavanagh		
27th	Patrick V. Murphy	January 6, 1970	October 1, 1970	Roman Gribbs		
28th	John Nichols	October 15, 1970	September 21, 1973	Roman Gribbs		
29th	Philip G. Tannian	1974	1975	Roman Gribbs, Coleman Young		
30th	Bill Hart	1976	February 14, 1991	Coleman Young		
31st	Stanley Knox	February 14, 1991	1994	Coleman Young		
32nd	Isaiah McKinnon	1994	1998	Dennis Archer		
33rd	Benny Napoleon	July 1998	July 15, 2001	Dennis Archer		
34th	Charles Wilson	July 15, 2001	2002	Dennis Archer		
35th	Jerry Oliver	October 31, 2003	2003	Kwame Kilpatrick		
36th	Ella Bully-Cummings	November 3, 2003	September 2008	Kwame Kilpatrick	Acting chief November 3, 2003 – 2004	
37th	James Barren	September 2008	July 4, 2009	Kenneth Cockrel Jr., Dave Bing		
38th	Warren Evans	July 6, 2009	June 21, 2010	Dave Bing		
39th	Ralph Godbee	June 21, 2010	October 9, 2012	Dave Bing	Was interim police chief from Jun. 21-Sep. 21, 2010; suspended from position from Oct. 3, 2012 until his Oct. 9, 2012 resignation	
—N/a	Chester Logan (interim)	October 9, 2012	July 1, 2013	Dave Bing		
40th	James Craig	July 1, 2013	June 1, 2021	Dave Bing, Mike Duggan		
41st	James E. White	June 1, 2021	November 10, 2024	Mike Duggan	Was interim police chief from Jun. 1–Sep. 21, 2021	
42nd	Todd Bettison	November 11, 2024	present	Mike Duggan, Mary Sheffield	Was interim police chief from Nov. 11, 2024–Feb. 18, 2025	
