= Jerry Buckley =

Jerry Buckley may refer to:

- Jerry Buckley (cartoonist) (1932–2000), American cartoonist
- Jerry Buckley (journalist) (1891–1930), American radio commentator

== See also ==
- Gerald Buckley (disambiguation)
