= Gerald Buckley =

Gerald Buckley may refer to:

- Gerald E. "Jerry" Buckley (1891–1930), American journalist
- Gerald Buckley (actor), see Shadow and Substance

== See also ==
- Jerry Buckley (disambiguation)
