= Frank Couzens =

American politician

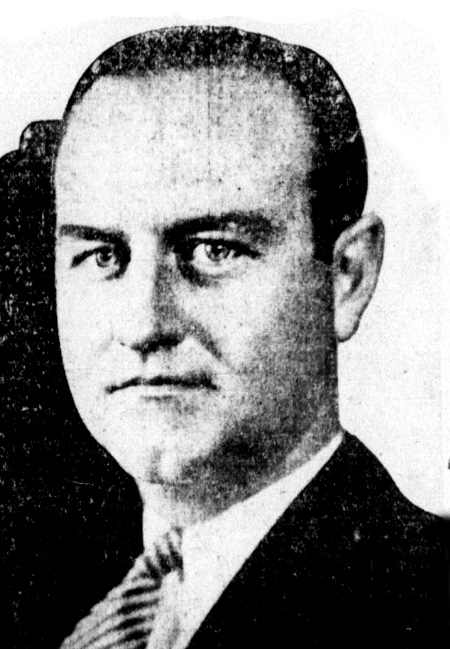
- Frank Couzens, Mayor of Detroit, in 1933

56th Mayor of Detroit, Michigan
- In office January 2, 1934 – January 3, 1938
- Preceded by: John W. Smith
- Succeeded by: Richard Reading
- In office May 10, 1933 – September 8, 1933
- Preceded by: Frank Murphy
- Succeeded by: John W. Smith

President of the Detroit City Council
- In office 1932 – May 1933

Personal details
- Born: February 28, 1902 Detroit, Michigan
- Died: October 31, 1950 (aged 48) Detroit, Michigan
- Parent: James J. Couzens (father)

Frank Couzens (February 28, 1902 – October 31, 1950) was the son of United States Senator James J. Couzens, and mayor of Detroit, Michigan during the 1930s.

== Early life ==
Frank Couzens was born in Detroit on February 28, 1902, the son of businessman (and later mayor of Detroit and United States Senator) James J. Couzens. He went to Newman Preparatory School in New Jersey, then returned to Detroit to attend high school. After graduation, he worked as an apprentice in the building trades, then as an inspector for an architectural firm. In 1922, he formed his own building contractor firm.

Frank Couzens married Margaret Lang in 1922; the couple had four sons: Frank Couzens Jr., James Couzens II, Homer J. Couzens, and George L. Couzens; and three daughters: Mrs. Edward C. Roney, Mary Elizabeth Couzens, and Barbara Ann Couzens.

== Politics ==
In 1928, then-mayor John C. Lodge appointed Couzens a member of the Detroit Street Railways Commission. He was fired by the next mayor, Charles Bowles, in 1930 after opposing Bowles's effort to raise the streetcar fare. However, the deeply unpopular Bowles was recalled from office, and Frank Murphy reinstated Couzens.

In 1931, Couzens ran for a seat on the Detroit City Council, and garnered enough votes to become council president. When Murphy resigned in 1933 to become governor of the Philippines, Couzens became acting mayor. He resigned the mayor's office on September 8, 1933, to concentrate on receiving the Republican nomination for the office. He was elected mayor twice, filling out four years in office.

== Later life ==
After stepping down from the mayor's office, Couzens retired from politics and founded the Wabeek Bank of Detroit, whose chairman he remained for the next 12 years. He died after a long battle with cancer on October 31, 1950. Wabeek Bank would after a series of mergers become part of Comerica.

Political offices
Preceded by Frank Murphy	Mayor of Detroit; May 10 – September 8, 1933	Succeeded by John W. Smith
Preceded by John W. Smith	Mayor of Detroit; January 2, 1934 – January 3, 1938	Succeeded by Richard Reading
