= Isaiah McKinnon =

Former deputy mayor and first African American police officer in Detroit

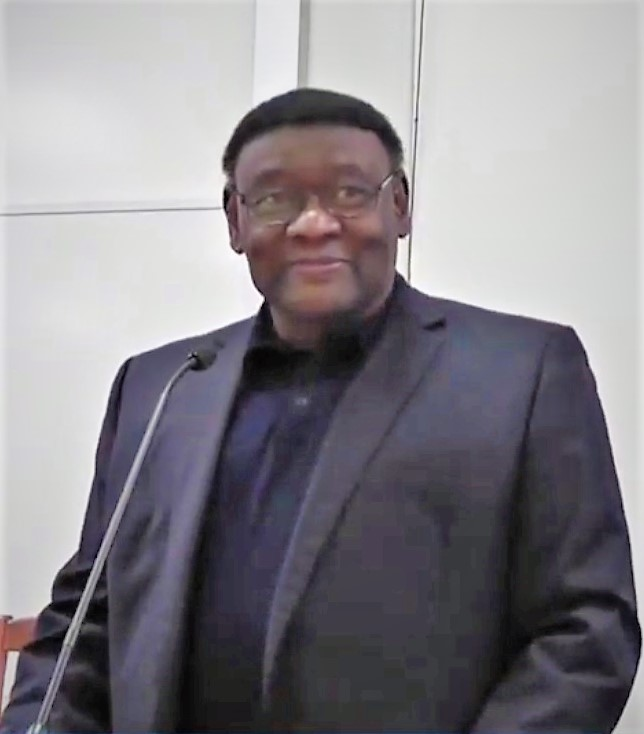
- McKinnon in 2016

Deputy Mayor of Detroit
- In office 2013–2016

Chief of the Detroit Police Department
- In office 1993–1998
- Preceded by: Stanley Knox
- Succeeded by: Benny Napoleon

Personal details
- Born: June 21, 1943 (age 83) Montgomery, Alabama, U.S.
- Education: University of Detroit Mercy; Michigan State University
- Occupation: police officer; politician; academic

Military service
- Allegiance: United States
- Branch/service: United States Air Force
- Years of service: 1961–1965
- Battles/wars: Vietnam War

Isaiah "Ike" McKinnon (born June 21, 1943) is an American politician, academic, and law enforcement officer. He was a police officer in the Detroit Police Department from 1965 to 1984 and was the Chief of the Detroit Police Department from 1993 to 1998. He was one of the first African American officers in the Detroit police force. He also held the position of deputy mayor of Detroit from 2013 to 2016 and was a professor at the University of Detroit Mercy. In 1967, while serving as an officer in the Detroit police, McKinnon was almost killed by racist fellow police officers in an incident that was later covered internationally.

== Early life and education ==
McKinnon was born on June 21, 1943, in Montgomery, Alabama. His father, Cota, was a carpenter who played catcher in Negro league baseball, while his mother, Lula, was a housewife.

In 1957, at the age of 14, Mckinnon was beaten by police officers on his way home from school. According to McKinnon, that incident inspired him to join the police force to help reform the system.

McKinnon served in the United States Air Force from 1961 to 1965, attending basic training in Texas and spending three years at Minot Air Force Base in North Dakota. He later served overseas in the Philippines and Vietnam during his last year in the military.

McKinnon holds a doctorate in higher education administration from Michigan State University, a master's in criminal justice from Mercy College of Detroit, and a bachelor's in history and law enforcement from the University of Detroit.

== Career ==
=== Police force ===
McKinnon joined the Detroit police department in 1965 and worked there until 1984. He later rejoined the force as chief of police from 1993 to 1998.

Throughout his police career, McKinnon frequently faced racism from his fellow white police officers. McKinnon was also the "poster officer" for recruiting more minorities into the police force, with his picture being used on police recruiting posters. McKinnon led initiatives in the police force, such as teaching officers basic Spanish to communicate better with Hispanic Americans, and he also laid the groundwork for a gun buy-back program.

During the 1967 Detroit riot, racial tensions increased in Detroit, and one night, his fellow white police officers tried to kill him. McKinnon was driving home after an 18-hour shift when he was pulled over by fellow police officers. Despite identifying himself as a police officer while in his police uniform. One officer held a gun to him and said "Tonight you’re going to die, nigger." The officer shot at him but missed. McKinnon fled in his car. Though he reported the incident, no action was taken.

He also led the investigation into the 1994 Cobo Arena attack on Nancy Kerrigan.

=== Deputy mayor ===
Detroit mayor Mike Duggan appointed McKinnon as deputy mayor in 2013, where he helped with the mayor's faith-based initiatives. He supported the installation of the controversial Homeless Jesus statue in front of Detroit's Saints Peter and Paul Church.

=== Academia ===
McKinnon was an associate professor of Education at the University of Detroit Mercy. He took a leave of absence for two years while serving as deputy mayor of Detroit and retired before September 2020.

=== Security ===
McKinnon served as the security detail for Detroit mayor Jerome Cavanagh.

=== Works ===
McKinnon's autobiography, Stand Tall, which was co-written by Barry Gottlieb, was published by Sleeping Bear Press in 2001.

== Personal life ==
McKinnon, raised as a Baptist, converted to Catholicism after marrying his wife.
