= Croc O' Shirt =

Line of apparel

Croc O' Shirt patch

Croc O' Shirt was a line of apparel marketed by Mad Dog Productions, mocking the Lacoste shirts in the early 1980s. The brand's name was a pun on the phrase "crock of shit" and its logo was a deceased Lacoste crocodile lying on its back.

Croc O'Shirt was introduced in late 1980. As Mad Dog Productions CEO Barry Gottlieb put it, Richmond, Virginia, where he was based, "...was 'the heart of prepdom.' 'First, there were Izod shirts,' he says. 'Then you were seeing the alligator on socks and pants and belts, just everywhere. One day I was sitting in a bar with my girlfriend, and I said, 'You know what I'd like, a shirt with a dead alligator on it.'"

Sold primarily through mail order, the shirts were a hit with "anti-preppies," with reported sales in 1983 of $300,000. In 1982, Lacoste filed suit against Mad Dog Productions, claiming trademark infringement. The lawsuit garnered publicity worldwide. The suit was eventually settled out of court, allowing Mad Dog Productions to sell the shirts for another year, through July 16, 1984. In the end, Gottlieb sold 90,000 Croc O' Shirts at $14.45 each, for a total of $1,300,500 in gross revenue.

== Other Mad Dog Productions products ==
Mad Dog Productions went on to release other novelty items:

- Preptile temporary tattoos (introduced c. 1982) — "featuring stick-on pictures of live and dead alligators." Attempting to cash in on the popularity of the Croc O' Shirt, the Preptiles sold only 20,000 sheets.
- Horse Shirt (introduced 1982) — a take-off on the Polo Ralph Lauren Polo shirt which "shows the rider being dragged behind the horse." The product attracted a lawsuit — similar to the one related to Croc O' Shirt — from Polo Ralph Lauren, Ltd., in late 1983, which in 1984 was also settled out of court, with Mad Dog Productions agreeing to stop selling the parody shirt by the end of the year. Ultimately, the company sold 20,000 Horse Shirts at $14.45 each, for a total of $289,000 in gross revenue.
- Silent Vigil Foam Rubber wind chimes (introduced 1984) — "for those who love the look but hate the sound."
- Earl the Dead Cat (introduced 1985) — "A flat, understuffed toy cat with X's for eyes, Earl comes with a humorous death certificate listing all the reasons a dead cat is better than a live one." (Gottlieb made references to both Hello Kitty and Cabbage Patch Kids when discussing Earl the Dead Cat.) Although Mad Dog Productions was not sued for the Earl the Dead Cat toy, many major newspapers refused to sell advertising for it, including the Chicago Tribune, the Los Angeles Times, and The Washington Post; while The New York Times and USA Today both ran the ad once and then refused to run it again. Reported sales in 1985 were 4,300 at $15.95 each (approximately $68,500).

== Other activities / later developments ==
In the 1980s, Mad Dog Productions also managed a few Richmond-area new wave music bands, including Suzy Saxon and the Anglos. Gottlieb's label Brat Records released the group's debut album, Guilt by Association in 1984, as well as a couple of follow-up albums.

In the late 1980s and early 1990s, Gottlieb organized the annual "Richmond's Tacky Xmas Decoration Contest and Grand Highly Illuminated House Tour," which was covered by, among others, NPR and Bravo.

Beginning in 1995, after moving to San Francisco, Gottlieb became a published humorist, writing a weekly column, Doing It Doggy Style, which was published in such newspapers as the San Francisco Chronicle, the San Francisco Examiner, the Chicago Tribune, the New York Daily News, and the Boston Phoenix, His audio commentaries were aired on the Pacifica Radio Network.

Gottlieb has published a number of books, including:

- Skywriting at Night (Xlibris, 2000, ISBN 978-0738821153)
- (with Isaiah McKinnon) Stand Tall (Sleeping Bear Press, 2001, ISBN 978-1886947962)
- If it's Such a Small World Then Why Have I Been Sitting on this Airplane for Twelve Hours? (Lulu Press, July 2008, ISBN 978-1435748194)
