= James Woffendale Inches =

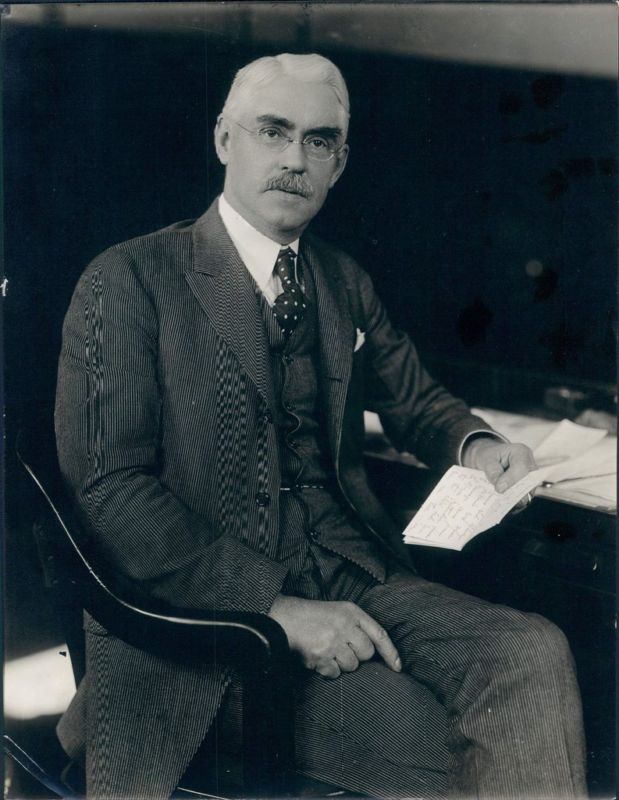
Dr. James W. Inches

James W. Inches (October 30, 1860 – March 29, 1952) was a physician, businessman, Michigan political figure, big game hunter and aviation enthusiast.

== Early life ==
James Woffendale Inches was born in Fredericton, New Brunswick, on October 30, 1860, the son of Andrew and Margaret Inches. His father served as the Deputy Surveyor General of Crown Lands for the Province of New Brunswick. His father was a native of Perthshire, Scotland and a member of the Smalls of Dirnanean.

Inches left Fredericton shortly after his formal education was completed. Initially he went to Toronto, Canada, but later moved to Detroit, Michigan, where he pursued a variety of business endeavors. In 1885 he relocated to St. Clair, Michigan as manager of the mineral water department of the Oakland Hotel, at that time one of the largest resorts in the United States. Building on this experience, as well as a similar position in Detroit, he became president and general manager of the Salutaris Mineral Water Company.

== Medical career ==
Acting on a lifelong inclination towards medicine, and following in the footsteps of his brother, Charles Inches of New Brunswick and Prince Edward Island, Canada and Scribner, Nebraska, Inches enrolled in Detroit Medical College, graduating in 1896.

After receiving his medical degree, Inches opened a medical office in St. Clair, where he practiced for many years. In 1908, he was named the City Physician for St. Clair, Michigan. Finding the life of a general practitioner too sedate, Inches eventually retired from active practice.

In 1917, Inches accepted a position to represent the American Red Cross touring war-ravaged Europe studying hospital conditions, surgical treatments and sanitary conditions. On one such inspection he was just eight minutes ahead of enemy troops when they broke through the Italian front.

== Politics ==
Inches' entry into politics began with his election as mayor of St. Clair, Michigan in 1899. He ended up serving for five consecutive terms.

In 1917, Inches accepted an appointment as the Commissioner of Health in Detroit, becoming a national figure for his views on handling the 1918 flu pandemic. He felt masks were useless in controlling the pandemic and felt limiting public events was not warranted, but ultimately he enforced the statewide closure bans. Inches felt controlling the military's entry into Detroit to be more critical to the spread of the epidemic.

From January 14, 1919 to February 3, 1923 he served as the Chief of Police in Detroit under Mayor James Couzens. During his time in this office Inches oversaw the relocation of the police department to new headquarters and dealt with the increase crime associated with being a border city during Prohibition. He also established the fingerprint and firearm laboratories in the city.

When Mayor Couzens was appointed to the U.S. Senate in 1923, Inches attempted a bid for the office of the mayor of Detroit. He won the runoff election but lost in the general election to Frank Doremus.

After his Detroit mayoral defeat, Inches retired from public life.

== Personal life ==
Inches was a first class passenger on the Cunard's Pavonia steamer when it became disabled due to storms and had to be towed to the Azores for repair.

He had his nose cut off in a street railway accident between St. Clair and Detroit, but successfully had it reattached.

In pursuit of his hobby of big game hunting, Inches made several trips to Africa. On a 1924 trip, Inches and three other Detroiters walked over seven hundred miles through the Mountains of the Moon, the Congo and Rhodesia. On his return from a second hunting expedition in 1928 Inches was shipwrecked off the east coast of Africa with the sinking of the steamer Cariboo. He spent several hours in a lifeboat before being rescued by a passing liner responding to the ship's S.O.S. call. He lost all of his luggage and hunting trophies, but was able to save several thousand feet of film from his expedition.

An aviation enthusiast, the Detroit press often reported on Inches's air adventures. One such article noted him stunting in the air with a French flying ace over the Detroit River. In April 1921, Inches was reported as one of the passengers on the sixteen-hour flight of the giant aeromarine flying craft, Santa Maria, in its trip from Miami, Florida, to Washington, D.C. On another occasion he missed boarding a London to Paris flight by barely five minutes. The plane, moments later, crashed over the English Channel killing all on board. The press articles comically characterized that Inches preferred to travel by air whether he had anywhere to go or not, and that he could not hear the sound of an airplane without leaving the ground.

Inches also headed the Automobile Club of Michigan for several terms.

Inches, a lifelong bachelor, died at the home of a nephew in Merion, Pennsylvania, on March 29, 1952. He was 91 years old. His remains were cremated.
