= Benny Napoleon =

American politician

Benny N. Napoleon
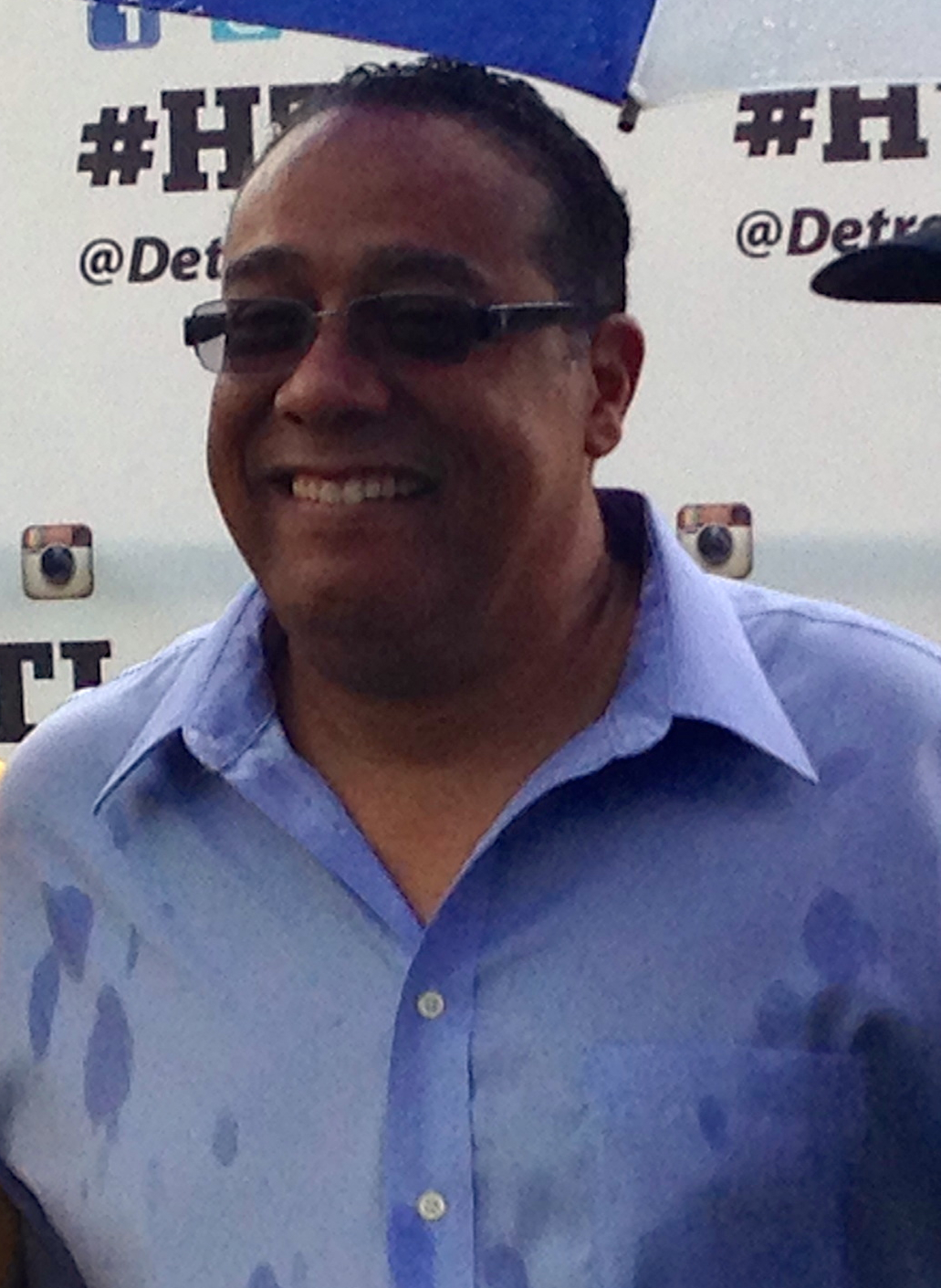
- Napoleon in 2013

Wayne County Sheriff
- In office July 6, 2009 – December 17, 2020
- Preceded by: Warren Evans
- Succeeded by: Raphael Washington

Chief of the Detroit Police Department
- In office July 1998 – July 15, 2001
- Mayor: Dennis Archer
- Preceded by: Isaiah McKinnon
- Succeeded by: Charles Wilson

Personal details
- Born: September 10, 1955 Detroit, Michigan, U.S.
- Died: December 17, 2020 (aged 65) Detroit, Michigan, U.S.
- Party: Democratic
- Spouse: Lisa Cunningham (divorced)
- Education: Mercy College of Detroit (BA); Detroit College of Law (JD)
- Profession: Police officer
- Website: bennynapoleon.com

Benny Nelson Napoleon (September 10, 1955 – December 17, 2020) was an American attorney, law enforcement officer, and politician who served as the sheriff of Wayne County, Michigan from 2009 to 2020. A member of the Democratic Party, he previously served as the chief of the Detroit Police Department, and was also a candidate for the office of mayor of Detroit in the 2013 election.

== Early life and education ==
Born in Detroit in 1955, he was one of seven children of his mother Betty and father Harry Napoleon, who was a minister. Napoleon graduated from Cass Technical High School. He earned a bachelor's degree from the University of Detroit Mercy and a Juris Doctor from the Detroit College of Law.

== Career ==
Napoleon entered the Detroit Police Department in 1975. He was also a member of the Detroit Police basketball team that played in international police tournaments in Ontario, Canada from 1978 to 1980. He served as Detroit Police Chief from 1998 to 2001 under Dennis Archer. In 2004, he was made Assistant Wayne County Executive, and in 2009, he became Wayne County sheriff.

In 2017, Napoleon was wiretapped by the FBI as part of a corruption investigation. No charges were ever filed on Napoleon.

=== 2013 Detroit mayoral election ===
A Democrat, Napoleon entered Detroit politics in 2013, announcing his intentions to run for mayor in the city's non-partisan primary to replace Dave Bing, who announced he would not seek re-election after the appointment of an emergency manager for the city. During the primary campaign, he referred to himself as a "businessman with a badge". Napoleon placed second in the primary despite his most serious competition, former Wayne County Prosecutor and Detroit Medical Center CEO Mike Duggan having to run as a write-in candidate, and lost the mayoral race to Duggan on November 5, 2013.

== Illness and death ==
In November 2020, it was announced that Napoleon had tested positive for COVID-19 during the COVID-19 pandemic in Michigan. He was admitted to a local hospital on November 21 and placed on a ventilator. On December 17, after various sources reported that Napoleon had died, his family released a statement on Facebook that he remained in stable condition. Napoleon died later that same day.
