= William P. Rutledge =

Rutledge, circa 1926

William P. "Silver Bill" Rutledge (July 10, 1869–March 8, 1955) was an American police officer who served as chief of the Detroit Police Department. He also served president of the International Association of Chiefs of Police and police chief of Wyandotte, Michigan.

== Early life and career ==
Rutledge was born July 10, 1869 in Richmond, Michigan.

In his early career, Rutledge worked as an iron molder and railroad fireman.

== Detroit Police Department ==
Rutldge had a lengthy career in the Detroit Police Department, which included a stint as its head (1926–30) Per his obituary in the New York Times, his career with the department was 30 years. His obituary in the Detroit Free Press reported it to have been even more extensive, at 47 years.

Rutledge first became an officer in 1895, starting as a sergeant. In his early police career, he led the departments mounted division during parades along Woodward Avenue, riding his black horse named "Black Diamond". Around this time, the white-haired Rutledge was given the affectionate monicker "Silver Bill". By 1918, he had risen the ranks to First Deputy Superintendent, a position he held until being promoted to Commissioner (chief) in 1926.

In the 1890s, Rutledge was involved in the creation of the national National Bureau of Criminal Identification.

At the department, Rutledge was credited with overseeing many pioneering changes to policing. This included the pioneering organization of a police academy (the Police Training School), which would later become standard for city police departments across the United States. Rutledge also implemented the department's practice of using a index card system for keeping records of arrests and accidents.

Rutledge created the department's Police Ballistics Bureau, which became a template for similar bureau's established at other police departments in the United States.

From 1923–24, Rutledge served as president of the International Association of Chiefs of Police.

=== Tenure as Commissioner (1926–30) ===
Rutledge served as Commissioner (head of the entire department) from July 15, 1926 to January 21, 1930. Having been promoted up the ranks, he was the first head to have previously worked as a rank-and-file officer (patrolman) in the department.

During his tenure, Detroit became the first police department to use police radio for communication. The one-way radio system, rolled-out in 1927 and 1928, saw the installation of radio receivers in police cars so that they could hear announcements of the license plate numbers of stolen vehicles broadcast via a commercial radio frequency. Detroit's use of radio equipment for communication to patrol cars served as a model that was followed by other U.S. police departments, which followed the lead first set in Detroit of using radio for police communication. Detroit had earlier experimented with radio receivers in 1922, but standard radio receiver setups of the day proved ineffective for police needs, and the experiment was initially ended by Rutledge in 1927. After this, two officers, Kenneth Cox and Robert L. Batts, persuaded Rutledge to allow them to design and test a more reliable receiver design. Their design was rolled-out the following year, receiving signals from a new radio station erected on Belle Isle (away from the downtown skyscrapers, unlike the broadcast station used in previous experiments) and proved vastly more successful than earlier attempts.

== Later career and death ==
Rutledge retired from the Detroit Police Department in 1930. After his retirement, he remained a consultant in law enforcement technique and police administration. He also served as chief of the department of Wyandotte, Michigan, a Detroit suburb.

Rutledge authored "This Terrible Traffic Problem", an essay chronicling the history of vehicular congestion (road traffic) dating back to the 1890s, which was published as a stand-alone work in 1949 by the Garn Griffin Traffic Safety Association of Detroit.

Rutledge died of pneumonia at the age of 80 on March 8, 1955 at Mound Park Hospital in St. Petersburg, Florida (which he had been admitted at as a patient the previous evening after suffering a heart attack). He hand his wife had been vacationing for the winter at the Suwanee Hotel in St. Petersburg at the time of his death.
