= Charles Bowles (mayor) =

American politician (1884–1957)

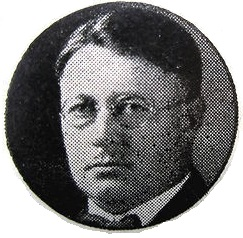

54th Mayor of Detroit, Michigan
- In office 1930–1930
- Preceded by: John C. Lodge
- Succeeded by: Frank Murphy

Personal details
- Born: March 24, 1884 Yale, Michigan, US
- Died: July 30, 1957 (aged 73) Detroit, Michigan, US
- Party: Republican
- Education: University of Michigan

Charles E. Bowles (March 24, 1884 – July 30, 1957) was an American politician from Michigan, and served as Mayor of Detroit in 1930.

== Life and career ==
Charles Bowles was born on March 24, 1884, in Yale, Michigan, the son of Alfred and Mary Lutz Bowles. He graduated from Ferris Institute (now Ferris State University) in 1904, received a law degree from the University of Michigan in 1908, and was admitted to the bar in 1909. He married Ruth Davis in 1915; the couple had one daughter, Helen Ruth Bowles.

Bowles entered politics from obscurity and to run for the mayor's office vacated by Frank Ellsworth Doremus's resignation in 1925. He was openly supported by the Ku Klux Klan. He ran third in the primary election behind John W. Smith and Joseph A. Martin, eliminating him from the ballot in the general election. However, Bowles continued his campaign as a write-in candidate, and nearly won, losing only after 15,000 ballots were disqualified. Bowles ran unsuccessfully for mayor once more the next year. After his mayoral run, he obtained a position as judge on the recorder's court. He was re-elected to his judgeship, but resigned to make one more run at the mayor's office in 1929.

Bowles defeated John C. Lodge in the primary and John W. Smith in the general election to win office. Bowles had campaigned as an anti-crime reformer, but when he fired Police Commissioner Harold Emmons after the latter had ordered a series of raids, he was accused of "tolerating lawlessness" and a recall election was instituted barely six months after he had entered office. Multiple people campaigned for Bowles's recall, including radio commentator Jerry Buckley. The recall was successful, but on the morning after, Buckley was shot in a hotel lobby. Although evidence later surfaced indicating the murder had more to do with underworld blackmail than politics, the murder of Buckley cast suspicion on Bowles. Bowles ran in the mayoral election a month later, but lost to Frank Murphy.

Later in his career he unsuccessfully ran for both the Michigan State House and U.S. House, as well as Detroit mayor.

Charles Bowles died on July 30, 1957, and is buried in Evergreen Cemetery.

Political offices
Preceded by John C. Lodge	Mayor of Detroit; 1930	Succeeded by Frank Murphy
