= Edward Jeffries =

American politician

Edward J. Jeffries Jr.
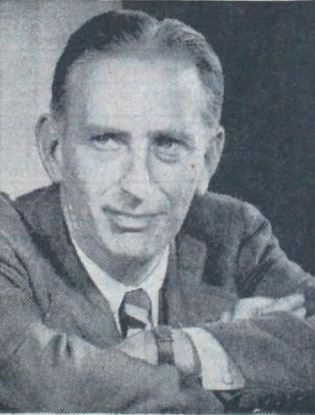

60th Mayor of Detroit
- In office January 2, 1940 – January 5, 1948
- Preceded by: Richard Reading
- Succeeded by: Eugene Van Antwerp

Member of the Detroit City Council
- In office January 1950 – April 2, 1950
- Succeeded by: Eugene Van Antwerp
- In office January 1932 – January 1940

Personal details
- Born: April 3, 1900 Detroit, Michigan, U.S.
- Died: April 2, 1950 (aged 49) Miami Beach, Florida, U.S.
- Spouse: Florence O. Bell (m. 1930)
- Education: University of Michigan
- Profession: Lawyer

Edward J. Jeffries Jr. (April 3, 1900 – April 2, 1950) was an American politician, councilman, and mayor of Detroit.

== Early life ==
Edward Jeffries was born in Detroit, Michigan, on April 3, 1900, the son of Judge Edward J. Jeffries and Minnie Stott Jeffries. The elder Jeffries was an alderman, a police justice, and a long-serving judge on the Recorder's Court. He had run unsuccessfully for mayor multiple times, seeing himself as a representative of the underclass, and instilled in the younger Jeffries a sense of civic responsibility.

The younger Jeffries attended the Detroit Public Schools and the University of Michigan, receiving a Bachelor of Arts degree from the University of Michigan in 1920 and a law degree from the University of Michigan Law School in 1923. He then continued his education at Lincoln's Inn in London in 1923 and 1924, studying Roman and British common law. After his tour in Europe, Jeffries returned to Detroit to take up law practice. In 1929, he became general counsel for Royal Maccabees Insurance, a position he held until his death in 1950. In 1930, Jeffries married Florence O. Bell.

== Politics ==
Jeffries ran for Detroit City Council in 1931, and served on that body for four terms, from 1932 until 1940, serving the last two as City Council president. While serving on the council, Jeffries came under the influence of long-time councilman John C. Lodge. Jeffries was already more moderate in stance than his radical father, eager to work within the existing power structure, and Lodge, who shared a similar outlook, was a natural ally.

In 1939, Jeffries ran for mayor of Detroit against Richard Reading as an economically conservative, socially responsible reformer. Reading, enmeshed in an enormous corruption scandal that eventually sent him to jail, lost the election by more than two-to-one. He ran for election as mayor four more times, winning the next three to serve as mayor from 1940 to 1948. Jeffries bid for a fifth term was unsuccessful because of his unpopularity in the wake of the 1943 race riot, and he lost to councilman Eugene Van Antwerp. Jeffries was elected once more to serve on the City Council, beginning in 1950, but died in office.

Edward Jeffries suffered a heart attack on March 18, 1950, while on vacation in Miami Beach, Florida. He died shortly thereafter on April 2, 1950, a day short of his 50th birthday. The section of I-96 in Livonia and Detroit is named in Jeffries' honor.

Political offices
Preceded by Richard Reading	Mayor of Detroit; January 2, 1940 – January 5, 1948	Succeeded by Eugene Van Antwerp
