= Suzy Saxon and the Anglos =

- Suzy Saxon & the Anglos, 7-inch 45 (1983), plus promotional pins

Background information
- Origin: Richmond, Virginia
- Genres: Pop rock, new wave

Suzy Saxon and the Anglos were an American musical group formed in the early 1980s, a part of the new wave rock music scene. Based in Richmond, Virginia, the band was a creation of vocalist Suzy Peeples and guitarists Bob Bonham and Ray Fralin; drum and bass lineups changed often over the years but most often featured Nat Warriner and Jon Heckel respectively. Attractive blonde Suzy and her four male bandmates evoked comparisons to early Blondie, and the group's first single was heralded enthusiastically by fanzines and college radio. Though large-scale commercial success eluded them, they performed and recorded for over a decade.

== Recording history ==
Richmond entrepreneur Barry Gottlieb started his company, Mad Dog Productions, as a purveyor of novelty items including Croc O' Shirt, but soon became the manager for some local new wave bands, including Suzy Saxon and the Anglos. His label, Brat Records, released the group's debut album, Guilt by Association in 1984. Dave Marsh praised the album in his Rock and Roll Confidential newsletter, writing: "...rocks harder than R.E.M., plus you can understand the words. 'Radio Highlights' is an instant classic." In a retrospective review in which it gave the album 4 stars out of 5, AllMusic described it as a "blast of new wave pop flavored with girl-group vocals and mainstream southern rock guitars".

The album included the group's earlier 3-song EP, which had as its A-side "Boys in Dresses"; a music video for that song was shot at a Richmond beauty parlor and received airplay on MTV.

Their second album was released in 1987. Scream to be Heard was lauded in Cashbox for its "solid, exciting songwriting sensibilities". The magazine predicted that "major labels should sit up and beg". When this didn't happen, the group released another record on Brat, the 4-song 12-inch EP A Deal's a Deal (1988). Their final album, Downtime in Dogtown, was released by Brat in 1994.

== Discography ==
- "Boys in Dresses (Tonight)" b/w "Rebecca"' and "Get Out of My Stomach" 7-inch EP - Brat Records (US, 1983, MDP 91183-1)
- Guilt By Association - Brat (US, 1984, MDP-884-1)
- Scream To Be Heard - Brat (US, 1987, MDP-1086)
- A Deal's A Deal 12-inch EP - Brat (US, 1988, MDP-8808)
- Downtime in Dogtown - Brat (US, 1994)
