= 1930 United States Senate election in Michigan =

- November 4, 1930
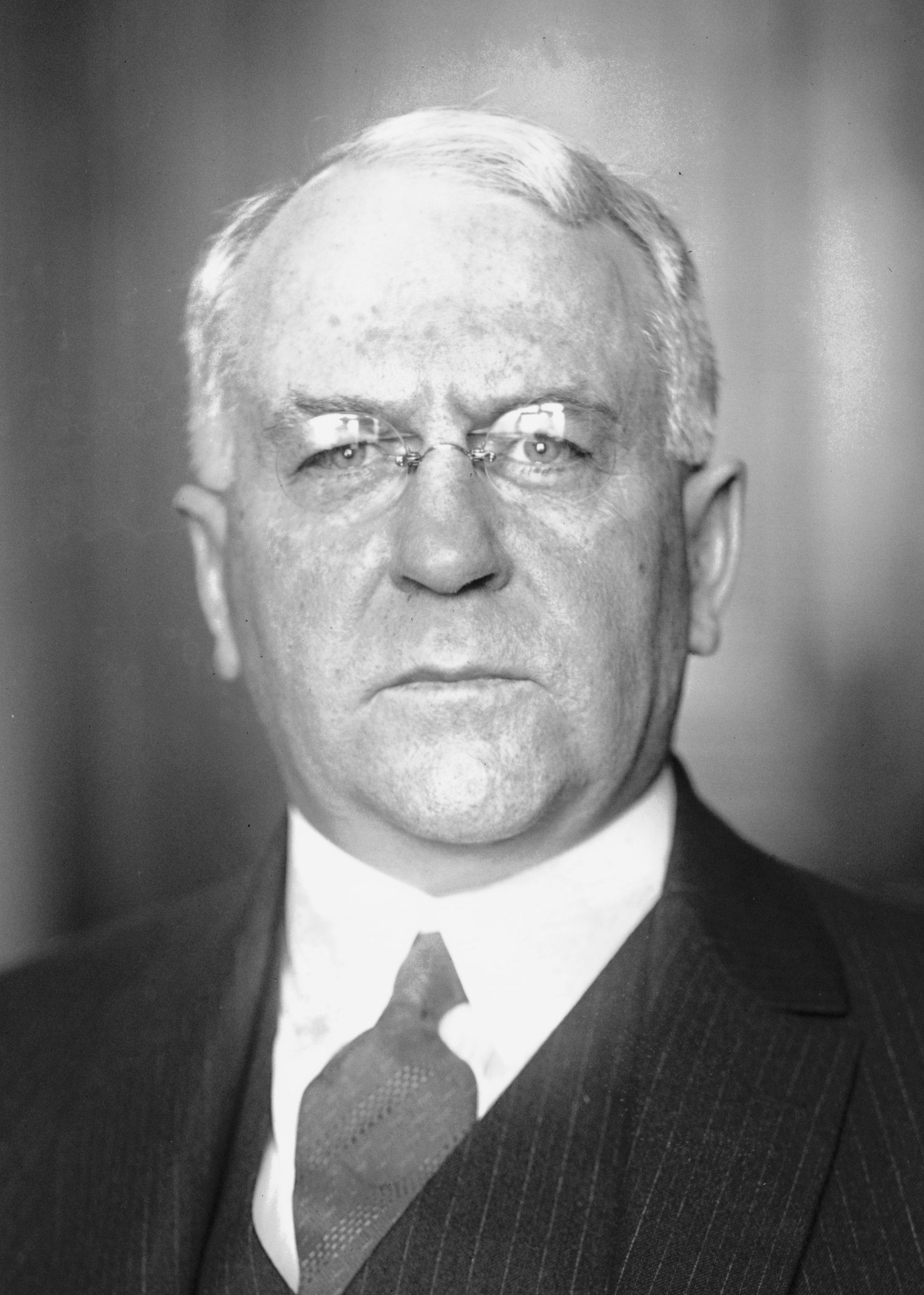

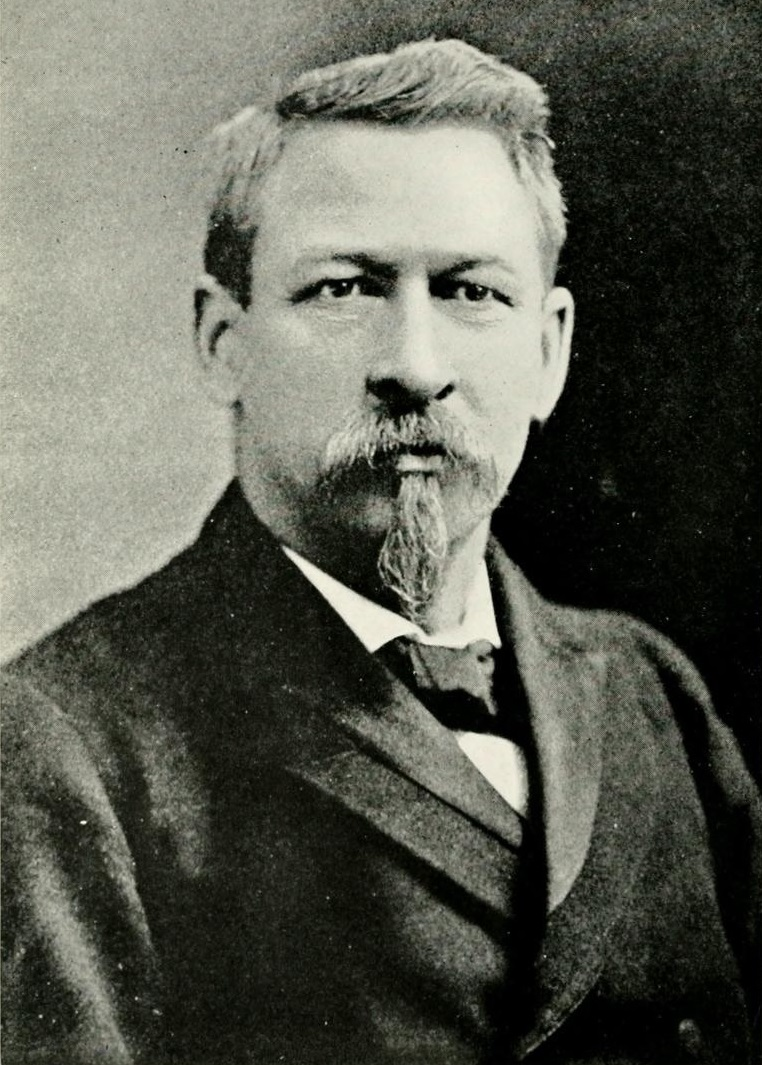
Nominee	James J. Couzens	Thomas Weadock
Party	Republican	Democratic
Popular vote	634,577	169,757
Percentage	78.15%	20.91%
- County results Couzens: 50–60% 60–70% 70–80% 80–90% >90%
U.S. senator before election
James J. Couzens
Republican
Elected U.S. Senator
James J. Couzens
Republican

The 1930 United States Senate election in Michigan was held on November 4, 1930. Incumbent Republican U.S. Senator James J. Couzens was re-elected to a second term in office over Democratic former U.S. Representative Thomas A. E. Weadock.

Despite the national wave favoring Democrats, Couzens won by a landslide even larger than his 1924 landslide.

== General election ==
=== Candidates ===
- James J. Couzens, incumbent U.S. Senator since 1922 (Republican)
- Milton E. Depew (Socialist)
- George Powers (Workers)
- Charles Rennells (Prohibition)
- Thomas A. E. Weadock, former U.S. Representative from Bay City (Democratic)

=== Results ===
1930 U.S. Senate election in Michigan
Party	Candidate	Votes	%	±%
Republican	James J. Couzens (incumbent)	634,577	78.15%	▲3.88
Democratic	Thomas A. E. Weadock	169,757	20.91%	▼4.30
Communist	George Powers	3,523	0.43%	N/A
Socialist	Milton E. Depew	2,419	0.30%	▲0.16
Prohibition	Charles Rennels	1,718	0.21%	▼0.51
Total votes		811,994	100.00%	
Republican hold				

== See also ==
- 1930 United States Senate elections
