= List of mayors of Detroit =

Mayor of the City of Detroit
- Seal of the City of Detroit

- Flag of the City of Detroit

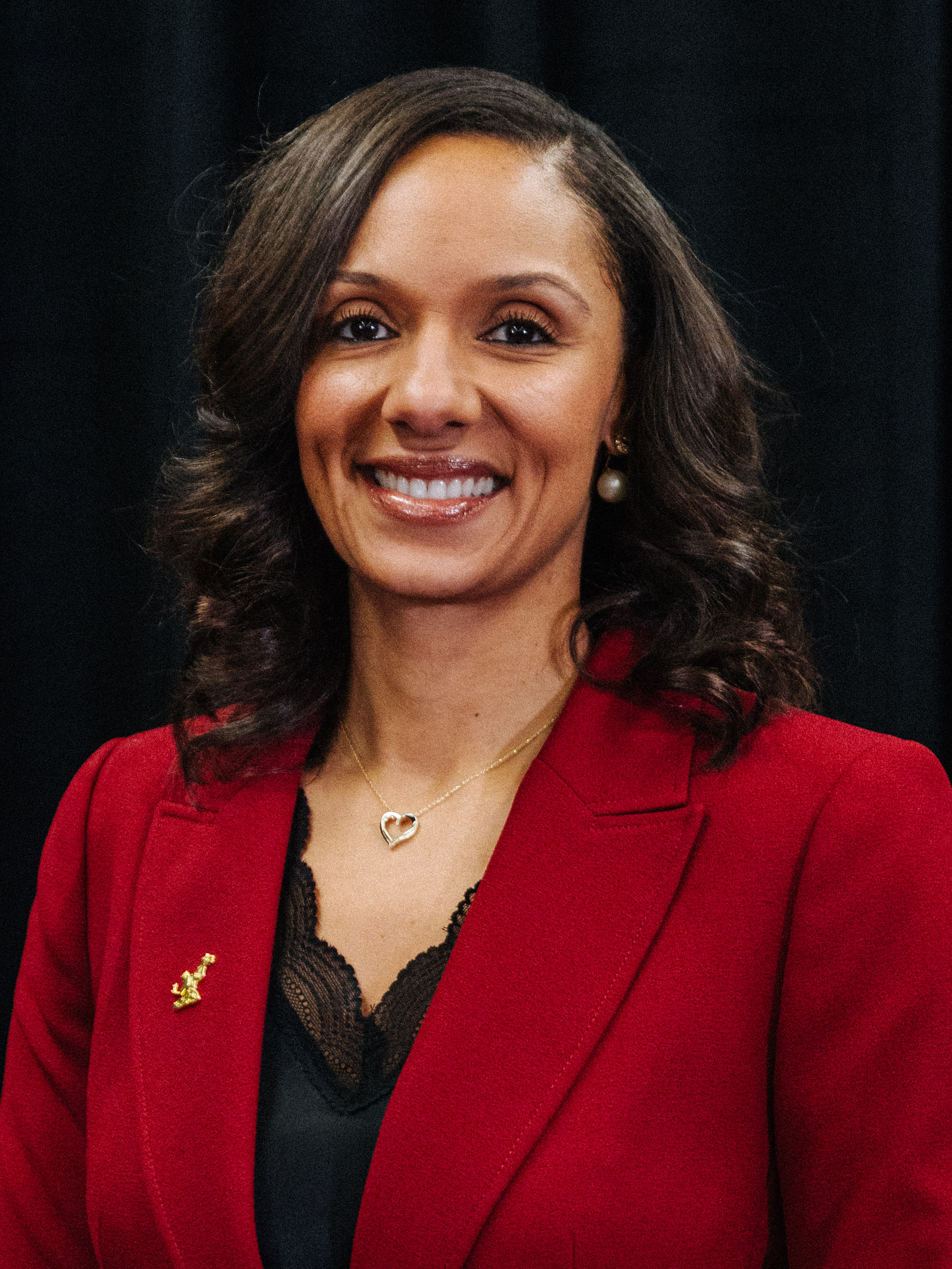
- Incumbent; Mary Sheffield since January 1, 2026
- Residence: Manoogian Mansion
- Term length: Four years; renewable
- Constituting instrument: Detroit City Charter
- Formation: 1824
- First holder: John R. Williams
- Website: Mayor's Office

This is a list of mayors of Detroit, in the U.S. state of Michigan. The current mayor is Mary Sheffield who was sworn into office on January 1, 2026.

== History of Detroit's executive authority ==
During the earliest part of its history, Detroit was a military outpost, and executive authority was wielded by first French, then British military commandants. Soon after the Detroit area was taken over by American forces, civil authority became more prominent, and executive authority was placed in the hands of a series of appointed officials, elected boards, and elected officials. This included a brief stint in 1806–1809 with a largely ceremonial mayor.

Detroit's current strong mayor system dates from the city's 1824 charter. From 1824 to 1857, mayors were elected to terms of one year; from 1858 to 1953 the term was increased to two years, and after 1953 mayoral terms were four years.

=== Early French and British leadership ===
During the early part of Detroit's existence, local authority was vested in French and British military commandants. French commandants included:

- Antoine de la Mothe Cadillac (1701–1710)
- François de la Forêt (1710–1714)
- Jacques-Charles Renaud Dubuisson (1714)
- Pierre Alphonse de Tonty (1717–1727)
- Jean-Baptiste de Saint-Ours Deschaillons (1728–1729)
- Louis Henry Deschamps, Sieur de Boishebert (1730–1733)
- Jacques-Hugues Péan de Livaudière (1733–1736)
- Pierre-Jacques Payen de Noyan, Sieur de Charvis (1739–1742)
- Pierre Joseph Celoron (1742–1744)
- Paul Joseph le Moyne, Chevalier de Longueuil (1744–1748)
- Pierre Joseph Celoron (second term, 1750–1754)
- Jacques-Pierre Daneau de Muy (1754–1758)
- Francois Marie Picote, Sieur de Belestre (1758–1760)

Seventeen British commandants led Detroit between 1760 and 1796.

- Major Robert Rogers (1760)
- Captain Donald Campbell (1760–1762)
- Major Henry Gladwin (1762–1764)
- Colonel John Bradstreet (1764)
- Lieutenant-Colonel John Campbell (1765–1766)
- George Turnbull (1766–1769)
- Captain James Stephenson (1770–1772)
- Captain George Etherington (1772)
- Major Henry Bassett (1772–1774)
- Captain Richard Beringer Lernoult (1774–1779)
- Colonel Arent Schuyler de Peyster (1779–1784)
- Major William Ancrum (1785–1786)
- Thomas Bennett (1786)
- Captain Robert Matthews (1787–1788)
- Major Patrick Murray (1788–1790)
- Major John Smith (1790–1792)
- Colonel Richard England (1792–1796)

=== Early American leadership ===
When Detroit was turned over to the Americans in 1796, Colonel Jean François Hamtramck was named commander of Detroit, a position he held until his death in 1803.

The first local rule of Detroit was established in 1802, when Detroit was incorporated as a town. The original incorporation provided for a board of trustees to govern the town, the chairman of which was the highest governmental position. The first chairman of the board, appointed on February 9, 1802, was James Henry. Henry was elected to the position later in the year. Subsequent elections were held in May of each year, with the chairmen of the Board of Trustees being:

- James Henry (1802–1803)
- James May (1803–1804)
- Solomon Sibley (1804–1805)
- Joseph Wilkinson (elected 1805)

=== 1806 charter ===
In 1805, a massive fire destroyed the town and effectively eliminated the government. Governor William Hull and Judge Augustus Woodward dissolved the original incorporation, replacing it in 1806 with a government headed by an appointed mayor. However, the position was largely honorary, and the two men who held it (Solomon Sibley and Elijah Brush) each quickly resigned upon realizing the lack of power in the office. The legislation creating this mayoral position was repealed in 1809, after which de facto political power still resided with Hull and Woodward, and Detroit was without either a mayor or board of trustees until after the War of 1812.

=== Second Board of Trustees ===
After the war, a legislative act in 1815 ended the interregnum and returned political control to the citizens of Detroit through a Board of Trustees, elected yearly. In October of that year, Solomon Sibley was elected as the first chair. The chairs elected yearly to this Board were:

- Solomon Sibley (1815–1816)
- George McDougall (1816–1817)
- Abraham Edwards (1817–1818)
- John R. Williams (1818–1819)
- James McCloskey (1819–1820)
- James Abbott (1820–1821)
- Andrew G. Whitney (1821–1822; 1822–1823)
- James Abbott (second term, 1823–1824)

=== 1824 charter ===
In 1824, John R. Williams drew up a new city charter that provided for the first time for a directly elected mayor, with significantly increased executive powers. Following approval by the state legislature, Williams became the City of Detroit's first elected mayor.

=== 1918 charter and nonpartisan elections ===
In June 1918 Detroit's first home-rule city charter came into effect, following passage by city voters in a referendum. The new charter mandated that all Detroit public offices be non-partisan, and that elections to those positions would be held on a non-partisan basis, with no party designations on the ballot. These provisions have been continued through all subsequent city charter revisions.

Since 1918, all mayoral elections in Detroit have been held on a non-partisan basis, and mayors have officially served unaffiliated with any political party. Thus, the party affiliations given in the chart below for mayors elected after 1918 are not official and are based on the inferences of editors based on available historic information.

=== Official residence ===
Since 1966, the official residence of the mayor of Detroit has been the Manoogian Mansion, located on Dwight Street in the Berry Subdivision Historic District, facing the Detroit River on the city's east side. The mansion was donated to the city by industrialist Alex Manoogian, founder of the Masco Corporation.

== First incorporation ==
Two mayors served under the 1806 charter.

#	Name	Term	Party	Notes
1	Solomon Sibley	1806	Democratic	Solomon Sibley was the author of Detroit's first city charter in 1806, and became the city's first mayor under the charter. However, when he found the office powerless in the face of the entrenched governor and judges, he resigned. Sibley went on to serve as chair of Detroit's board of trustees during the time between mayoral control, and later as a delegate to the United States House of Representatives and as a justice of the Michigan Supreme Court.
2	Elijah Brush	1806		Elijah Brush was appointed to the mayor's chair after Sibley's resignation, but like Sibley found the position powerless and soon resigned himself. He owned the ribbon farm immediately adjacent to Detroit, along which Brush Street now runs. Brush served as a lieutenant colonel in the Territorial Militia, and was taken prisoner during the War of 1812; he died soon after returning to Detroit in 1814.

== Reincorporation ==
The following mayors served under the stronger executive mayoral system begun in the 1824 charter:

#	Mayor		Term	Party	Notes
1	Mayor Williams	John R. Williams	1824–1825	Democratic	John R. Williams wrote the City Charter and served from 1824 to 1825 as the first mayor under the re-incorporation. He also served a second time in 1830, and a third in 1844–1846. He was a successful merchant, and served in a number of other capacities, including as one of the first trustees of the University of Michigan, was president of the Detroit Board of Education, and was a delegate to the first Michigan Constitutional Convention.
2		Henry Jackson Hunt	1826	Democratic	Henry Jackson Hunt was a successful merchant, and served in various political offices, including county judge, city assessor, and trustee of the University of Michigan. He was the uncle and namesake of Civil War General Henry Jackson Hunt. Hunt died while in office on September 15, 1826.
3		Jonathan Kearsley	1826	Democratic	Jonathan Kearsley served in the War of 1812, and was wounded badly enough to have his leg amputated. He moved to Detroit in 1819 to become of Receiver of Public Monies, a post he held for 30 years. Kearsley was mayor twice, being appointed once in 1826 to fill Henry Jackson Hunt's term after his death, and being elected himself in 1829.
4	Mayor Biddle	John Biddle	1827–1828	Whig	Major John Biddle was born in Philadelphia, Pennsylvania in 1792, the son of Charles Biddle, former Vice President of Pennsylvania, He was in the US Army during the War of 1812, and was active in Detroit politics and civic life. He went on to serve as Michigan Territory delegate to the United States House of Representatives. His summer estate, "Wyandotte," was expanded into the current city of Wyandotte, Michigan.
5		Jonathan Kearsley	1829	Democratic	(see above)
6	Mayor Williams	John R. Williams	1830	Democratic	(see above)
7		Marshall Chapin	1831	Whig	Marshall Chapin trained as a medical doctor, and established the first drugstore in Detroit in 1819, which endured well after Chapin's death and on into the 1880s. He served twice as mayor (in 1831 and 1833) and was appointed City Physician during the cholera epidemics of 1832 and 1834.
8		Levi Cook	1832	Whig	Levi Cook served in multiple positions in the government of Detroit and Michigan, including as Representative to the State House, Treasurer of the Michigan Territory, and mayor of Detroit in 1832, 1835, and 1836.
9		Marshall Chapin	1833	Whig	(see above)
10	Mayor Trowbridge	Charles Christopher Trowbridge	1834	Whig	Trowbridge moved to Detroit in 1819, at 19 years of age. In 1820, he served on the Lewis Cass expedition, led by Lewis Cass, so impressing Cass that the latter made Trowbridge his private secretary. In 1821, Trowbridge helped negotiate a treaty between the US government and the Winnebago and Menominee Indians, and was later appointed assistant secretary in the local Indian department. In 1833, Trowbridge became an alderman of the city of Detroit, and briefly served as Mayor during the cholera epidemic of 1834, resigning his position soon after. In 1837, he ran as the Whig candidate for governor of Michigan, and was defeated by Stevens T. Mason.
11		Andrew Mack	1834	Democratic	A cholera epidemic broke out in 1834 during Mayor Charles Christopher Trowbridge's term; when the epidemic had subsided, Trowbridge resigned. Andrew Mack won the ensuing special election on September 24 with 91 votes. He later represented Wayne County in the Michigan Legislature.
12		Levi Cook	1835–1836	Whig	(see above)
13		Henry Howard	1837	Democratic	Henry Howard moved to Detroit in 1827 to manage Howard and Wadhams, a commercial lumber venture. In his brief tenure in Detroit, he served as an alderman and mayor for one term, as well as the treasurer and auditor general of the state of Michigan. In 1840, Howard moved to Buffalo, New York to become treasurer of the Buffalo Savings Bank.
14	Mayor Porter	Augustus Seymour Porter	1838 – March 14, 1839	Whig	Augustus Porter was the nephew of Peter Buell Porter; he practiced law for 20 years in Detroit, acting as city Recorder in 1830 and elected mayor in 1838. He resigned on March 14, 1839, to serve as United States Senator for Michigan. In 1846 he moved to Niagara Falls, New York.
15		Asher B. Bates	March 15, 1839 – April 18, 1839	Whig	Asher Bates came to Detroit in 1831, and served as Justice of the Peace and City Attorney. After Porter resigned, Bates was acting mayor for the remainder of Porter's term. He later served as Attorney General for the Kingdom of Hawaii and died in 1873 in San Francisco of leprosy contracted in Hawaii.
16		De Garmo Jones	1839	Whig	De Garmo Jones came to Detroit from Albany, New York, and was involved in many business ventures, including the Michigan Central Railroad. In addition to serving as mayor, he was a city alderman multiple times, as well as state senator.
17	Mayor Pitcher	Zina Pitcher	1840–1841	Whig	Zina Pitcher was a medical doctor, and began his career as a surgeon in the United States Army, eventually becoming president of the Army Medical Board in 1835. After leaving the Army, he came to Detroit in 1836 and served in various positions, including both city and county physician, Regent of the University of Michigan, and three terms as mayor (1840, 1841, and 1843). While Regent, Pitcher took an active role in establishing the medical school at the university.
18	Mayor Houghton	Douglass Houghton	1842	Democratic	Douglass Houghton was educated as a medical doctor, but after coming to Michigan served as the state geologist from 1833 until his death in 1845, and as a geology professor at the University of Michigan. He was also a member of the National Institute in Washington DC and the Boston Society of Natural History, an honorary member of the Royal Antiquarian Society of Copenhagen, and a member of many other scientific and literary associations. Houghton died in 1845 in a storm on Lake Superior near Eagle River, Michigan. Houghton County, Michigan is named in his honor.
19	Mayor Pitcher	Zina Pitcher	1843	Whig	(see above)
20	Mayor Williams	John R. Williams	1844–1846	Democratic	(see above)
21		James A. Van Dyke	1847	Whig	James A. Van Dyke was a lawyer by profession, served as City Attorney for Detroit, Wayne County prosecuting attorney, city alderman, and mayor. In addition, he was heavily influential in early organization of the Detroit Fire Department, serving as president of the department from 1847 to 1851.
22	Mayor Buhl	Frederick Buhl	1848	Whig	Frederick Buhl moved to Detroit in 1833 and, with his brother Christian H. Buhl, began a business in hats and furs. The business was large and successful, and Frederick Buhl remained at the helm until 1887, when he sold the business to his son. In addition to his furrier business, Frederick Buhl was the director of two banks, the president of Harper Hospital, and one of the original directors of the Merchant's Exchange and Board of Trade. He also served on the city council as well as being mayor, and later in life joined the Republican Party.
23		Charles Howard	1849	Whig	Charles Howard moved to Detroit in 1840 as an agent for the shipping and forwarding firm of Bronson, Crocker, and Company, and branched out into railroad construction and other endeavors. He was simultaneously president of the Farmer's and Mechanics Bank and the Peninsular Bank, and in 1848 he was elected mayor of Detroit. Howard moved to New York City after the Panic of 1857 caused the Peninsular Bank to fail.
24		John Ladue	1850	Democratic	In 1847, Ladue moved to Detroit, and began in the business of manufacturing leather and purchasing wool. He was popular among the business community, and in 1850 was elected mayor. He died only a few years after in 1854.
25	Mayor Chandler	Zachariah Chandler	1851	Whig	Zachariah Chandler arrived in Detroit in 1833 and opened a dry goods store. After serving as mayor of Detroit, Chandler spent 18 years in the United States Senate, and was also the United States Secretary of the Interior under Ulysses S. Grant.
26		John H. Harmon	1852–1853	Democratic	John Harmon came to Detroit in 1838, as a member of the Hunter Patriots, a group dedicated to ridding North America of the British Empire. In December 1838, Harmon took part in the Battle of Windsor, personally burning the British barracks and the steamer Thames. After the battle, Harmon stayed in Detroit, taking a job at the Detroit Free Press, and eventually purchasing the paper. Harmon served as an alderman of the city of Detroit in 1847 and two years as mayor, as well as representing Michigan on the 1848 Democratic National Committee, and serving as Collector for the Port of Detroit. After he left the office of Collector, Harmon spent much of his time in Washington, DC, during congressional sessions.
27		Oliver Moulton Hyde	1854	Whig	Oliver Moulton Hyde moved to Detroit in 1838 and opened a hardware store on Woodward Avenue. Hyde branched out in business, opening a foundry and machine shop, and began manufacturing marine engines and other steamboat hardware, and later began a dry dock business. Hyde was elected to the city council numerous times, and served as mayor of Detroit in 1854, 1856, and 1857. He was also appointed Collector for the Port of Detroit under presidents Zachary Taylor and Millard Fillmore.
28	Mayor Ledyard	Henry Ledyard	1855	Democratic	Henry Ledyard was the son of prominent New York lawyer Benjamin Ledyard and Susan French Livingston (the daughter of Revolutionary War Colonel and US Supreme Court justice Brockholst Livingston and granddaughter of New Jersey governor William Livingston). When Lewis Cass was appointed Minister to France, Ledyard accompanied him to Paris, eventually becoming chargé d’affaires of the embassy and marrying Cass's daughter Mildred. Ledyard returned to the United States in 1844 and moved to Detroit, serving as a member of the Board of Education, an alderman of the city, one of the original commissioners on the Board of Water Commissioners, mayor in 1855, and state senator in 1857. When Lewis Cass was appointed Secretary of State under James Buchanan, Ledyard accompanied him to Washington, DC, and remained there until 1861, briefly serving as assistant secretary of state. Afterwards, he moved to Newport, Rhode Island, where he lived for the rest of his life and was the first president of the Newport Hospital and the president of the Redwood Library.
29		Oliver Moulton Hyde	1856–1857	Whig	(see above)
30		John Patton	1858–1859	Democratic	John Patton was a carriagemaker born in County Down, Ireland. He emigrated to the United States as a boy, and later came to Detroit and established a factory. He held many positions in the city, including chief engineer of the Fire Department, the Department president, city alderman, mayor, county auditor, Wayne County, Michigan sheriff, Justice of the Peace, and United States consul at Amherstburg, Ontario.
31	Mayor Buhl	Christian H. Buhl	1860–1861	Republican	Christian H. Buhl moved to Detroit in 1833 and, with his brother Frederick Buhl, began a business in hats and furs. The business was large and successful, and in 1855, Christian retired from the fur trade and started a wholesale hardware firm. Buhl was also part owner of the Sharon Iron Works, the Detroit Locomotive Works (later the Buhl Iron Works), and organized Detroit Copper and Brass Company and the Peninsular Car Company. He was an alderman as well as mayor of Detroit.
32		William C. Duncan	1862–1863	Democratic	William C. Duncan moved to Detroit in 1849 and set up shop as a brewer. He quickly became popular, and in 1852 was elected city alderman. He also served as the first council president, mayor, and state senator. Ill-health in the mid-1860s forced his retirement from business and politics, and Duncan died, childless, in 1877.
33		Kirkland C. Barker	1864–1865	Democratic	Barker was born in Schuyler, New York, and worked in the shipping business before coming to Detroit and establishing the successful tobacco business of KC Barker & Company. An avid outdoorsman, Barker was also the presiding officer of the Horse Association of America, and was elected Commodore of the Great Lakes Yacht Club. He died in a boating accident near his home on Grosse Ile, Michigan.
34	Mayor Mills	Merrill I. Mills	1866–1867	Democratic	Mills, born in Canton, Connecticut, originally planned to start a general store in Fort Wayne, Indiana in 1845. However, early closing of navigation that year left Mills with his stock in Detroit, and, sensing an opportunity, he set up shop there instead. Barker soon began trading in furs, then went into tobacco manufacturing as well as other pursuits. In addition to being mayor, he served two years as head of the Democratic State Committee, and was a delegate to the 1876 Democratic National Convention.
35		William W. Wheaton	1868–1871	Democratic	Wheaton was born in New Haven, Connecticut in 1833. He came to Detroit in 1853 and built a successful wholesale grocery business. He was elected mayor in 1868, and later served as the chair of the Democratic State Convention.
36		Hugh Moffat	1872–1875	Republican	Moffat was born in 1810 in Coldstream, Scotland, and made his way to Detroit in 1837. He began work as a carpenter, built up a successful and profitable business and expanded into the lumber trade by purchasing a sawmill and forested land. Moffat was elected mayor for two terms; his administration was marked by a fractious relationship with the Detroit City Council, but his integrity earned him the moniker "Honest Hugh Moffat."
37		Alexander Lewis	1876–1877	Democratic	Alexander Lewis was born in Windsor, Ontario and came to Detroit when he was 14 to work as a clerk. He eventually started his own forwarding & commission business, then moved onto wholesale trade and other businesses. In addition to being mayor, he served as Police Commissioner and a board member of the Detroit Public Library.
38		George C. Langdon	1878–1879	Democratic	George C. Langdon began work as a clerk, and eventually went into the business of brewing and malting, amassing a considerable fortune. After his stint in the mayor's office, he suffered some reversals of fortune, and was forced to return to clerking at the City Hall.
39		William G. Thompson	1880–1883	Republican	Thompson was a Republican while serving as mayor, and a delegate to both the 1876 and 1880 Republican National Convention. However, in 1884 he switched parties to become a Democrat. He ran once more for mayor in 1891, being defeated by the then-incumbent Hazen S. Pingree. He also served as a state senator, being elected in 1894. In 1888, Thompson was party to a sensational and public fight, where Thompson was considerably pummeled, with his broth-in-law Daniel Campau, where the latter warned Thompson that "he must not talk about his wife hereafter in barrooms and other public places, as he had been doing." William G. Thompson died in 1904 of injuries received after being knocked down by a bicycle.
40		Stephen Benedict Grummond	1884–1885	Republican	Stephen Benedict Grummond was born in Marine City, Michigan, and made his fortune in the shipping and marine industry. Grummond was originally a Democrat, but joined the Republican Party when it was established, and served on the Board of Estimates, the Detroit City Council, and one term as mayor.
41		Marvin H. Chamberlain	1886–1887	Democratic	Marvin H. Chamberlain was a wholesale liquor distributor. He served as president of the Detroit City Council before being elected mayor. In 1898, Chamberlain patented a "liquid separating process" for reduction of garbage, and received the contract to collect garbage in Detroit under the company name of Detroit Liquid Separating Co. He later built similar plants in other cities.
42		John Pridgeon Jr.	1888–1889	Democratic	John Pridgeon Jr. was born in Detroit on August 1, 1852, the son of Captain John Pridgeon. In 1871, he joined as a clerk his father's business of buying, selling, and operating sailing ships and tugs. Pridgeon was a member of the first Park Commission, serving from 1879 to 1883. He was elected to the city council in 1885, and in 1887 was elected mayor of Detroit, serving one term in 1888–1889. He later served as a member of the Police Commission from 1891 to 1892. After his stint as mayor, Pridgeon diversified his business interests, and in the years 1890–1900 served variously as president of the State Transportation Company, president of the Pridgeon Transportation Company, vice-president of the White Star Line, vice-president of the Red Star Line, and vice-president of the River Savings Bank.
43	Mayor Pingree	Hazen S. Pingree	1890–1897	Republican	Hazen Pingree was born in Denmark, Maine, and worked for several years in a shoe factory before enlisting in the Union Army to serve in the Civil War. Following the war, Pingree moved to Detroit and there established the Pingree and Smith Shoe Co., which eventually had sales of over $1,000,000 per year. Pingree was elected mayor of Detroit in 1889 on a platform of exposing and ending corruption in city paving contracts, sewer contracts, and the school board. During the depression of 1893, Pingree expanded the public welfare programs, initiated public works for the unemployed, built new schools, parks, and public baths. He gained national recognition through his "potato patch plan," a systematic use of vacant city land for gardens which would produce food for the city's poor. Pingree was elected mayor four times, and in 1896 was elected Governor of Michigan. However, his right to hold the two offices simultaneously was contested, and after the Michigan Supreme Court ruled against him, Pingree resigned as mayor on March 22, 1897. During his four years in office, the direct election of U.S. senators was promoted; an eight-hour workday was endorsed; a regulated income tax was supported; and railroad taxation was advocated.
44		William Richert	March 22, 1897 – April 5, 1897	Republican	William Richert served on the Detroit City Council for eight years, and as president of the body in 1895 and 1897. Richert served as acting mayor from March 22 to April 5, 1897, after Pingree was declared ineligible to serve as both mayor and governor.
45	Mayor Maybury	William C. Maybury	1897–1904	Democratic	Maybury served as the city attorney for Detroit during the 1870s, and was twice elected to the United States House of Representatives, in 1882 and 1884. He was elected mayor of Detroit in 1897 to complete Hazen S. Pingree's term, and was elected twice thereafter. In 1900, Maybury ran unsuccessfully for Governor of Michigan.
46		George P. Codd	1905–1906	Republican	George P. Codd studied as a lawyer and was admitted to the bar in 1892. He was assistant city attorney from 1894 to 1897, a member of the board of aldermen from 1902 to 1904, mayor of Detroit from 1905 to 1906, a regent of the University of Michigan in 1910 and 1911, circuit judge of Wayne County from 1911 to 1921 and 1924 to 1927, and a member of the United States House of Representatives from 1921 to 1923.
47		William Barlum Thompson	1907–1908	Democratic	William Barlum Thompson served as an alderman for two terms, from 1891 to 1894, and was elected for a third term in 1896. He resigned his seat as an alderman in 1897 after being elected city treasurer, and served as mayor for two terms, in 1907–1908 and 1911–1912.
48		Philip Breitmeyer	1909–1910	Republican	After finishing school, Breitmeyer joined the family florist business, John Breitmeyer & Sons, and after his father's death bought out his brothers to become sole owner of the firm. The business grew rapidly, and Breitmeyer was one of the organizers, and served as president, of Florists' Telegraph Delivery (now Florists' Transworld Delivery, or FTD). Breitmeyer was appointed by George P. Codd as Commissioner of Parks and Boulevards for the city of Detroit. So well did he perform that he was nominated as the candidate for mayor, and was elected for a term in 1909–1910. Breitmeyer ran again for mayor in 1933, but was soundly defeated by James Couzens's son Frank.
49		William Barlum Thompson	1911–1912	Democratic	(see above)
50		Oscar Marx	1913–1918	Republican	Oscar Marx was born on July 14, 1866, in Wayne County, Michigan, the son of German immigrants. As Detroit and Hamtramck, Michigan grew, the encroaching cities swallowed the Marx farm; when Oscar Marx's father sold the farm, he gave Oscar several thousand dollars, which he used to buy into a bankrupt optical firm, the Michigan Optical Company. Marx steered the company to become one of the largest in the region. In 1895 he was elected as an alderman, a position he held for eight years. In 1910, he was appointed City Assessor, and two years later saw his first of three terms as Detroit's mayor. Marx was friends with Robert Oakman and John Dodge, and the three men controlled the Republican Party in Southeast Michigan for much of the 1910s. Marx appointed James J. Couzens, the man who would become the next mayor, to take over the Detroit police force,

== Non-partisan elections ==
A new city charter went into effect in 1918, which required that all city offices be non-partisan. The following mayors were elected in non-partisan elections with no party designations on the ballot, and served on a non-partisan basis with no official party affiliation: This provision has been repeated in the subsequent city charters of 1974, 1997, and 2012: So, the party affiliations shown below are based on information from each mayor's personal and/or political history and do not represent any official status.

#	Mayor		Term	Party	Notes
51	Mayor Couzens	James J. Couzens	1919–1922	Republican	Couzens began his career working for the New York Central Railroad, then became a clerk for coal dealer Alexander Y. Malcomson. In 1903, Malcomson helped bankroll Henry Ford in his new venture, the Ford Motor Company. Couzens borrowed heavily and invested $2500 in the new firm, and took over the business side of the operation. Ford Motor Company became immensely profitable, paying Couzens large dividends; when he finally sold his stock to Ford in 1919, Couzens received $30,000,000. In the 1910s, Couzens was appointed street railway commissioner and police commissioner for Detroit. In 1919, he took the step to elected office, being twice elected mayor of Detroit. Couzens resigned on December 5, 1922, after being appointed as the United States Senator for Michigan, replacing the disgraced Truman H. Newberry. Couzens was re-elected twice more, and served in the Senate until his death in 1936. His son Frank served as Detroit mayor in the 1930s.
52		John C. Lodge	December 5, 1922 – April 9, 1923	Republican	John C. Lodge served for over 30 years on the Detroit City Council, many of them as its president. In that, capacity, Lodge served as acting mayor twice: once after James J. Couzens's resignation in 1922 and once after Joseph A. Martin's resignation in 1924. Lodge was later elected in his own right as mayor for one term in 1928–1930, after which he was re-elected to a seat on the City Council. After Lodge's death in 1950, the John C. Lodge Freeway (M-10) in Detroit was named after him.
53		Frank Ellsworth Doremus	April 9, 1923 – June 10, 1924	Democratic	Doremus was a newspaperman and lawyer. He served in the United States House of Representatives from 1911 to 1921, including a stint as chair of the Democratic Congressional Campaign Committee. Doremus was elected mayor in 1923, but resigned on June 10, 1924, due to ill-health.
54		Joseph A. Martin	June 10, 1924 – August 2, 1924	Republican	Joseph A. Martin was Commissioner of Public Works for Detroit from 1920 to 1923. He served as acting mayor in 1924 after Frank Ellsworth Doremus resigned for health reasons. Martin resigned to concentrate on running for mayor, but lost a three-way race to John W. Smith (with Charles Bowles as the write-in candidate). Joseph A. Martin died in 1928.
55		John C. Lodge	August 2, 1924 – November 21, 1924	Republican	(see above)
56		John W. Smith	November 21, 1924 – January 9, 1928	Republican	In 1911, Smith was appointed Deputy State Labor Commissioner by Governor Chase S. Osborn. He was elected to the Michigan State Senate in 1920, and was appointed postmaster of Detroit by Warren G. Harding in 1922. In 1924, Smith won election as Detroit mayor after Frank Ellsworth Doremus's resignation, continuing in the office until 1928. Smith later served on the Detroit City Council for most of the time from 1932 until his death in 1942. He served one more time as mayor in 1933, acting to fill out the end of Frank Murphy's term, after the latter had resigned and his successor, Frank Couzens, also resigned to concentrate on running for election as mayor.
57		John C. Lodge	January 10, 1928 – January 14, 1930	Republican	(see above)
58		Charles Bowles	January 14, 1930 – September 22, 1930	Republican	In 1925, Charles Boles rose from obscurity to run for the mayoral seat vacated by Frank Ellsworth Doremus, with heavy support from the Ku Klux Klan. He ran third in the primary election behind John W. Smith and Joseph A. Martin, but continued his campaign as a write-in candidate, and narrowly lost only after 15,000 write-in ballots were disqualified. Bowles ran again in 1929, this time defeating both Smith and John C. Lodge to win the election. Bowles had campaigned as an anti-crime reformer, but when he fired Police Commissioner Harold Emmons after the latter had ordered a series of raids, he was accused of "tolerating lawlessness" and a recall election was instituted barely six months after he had entered office. The recall was successful, and Bowles lost the special election called to replace him to Frank Murphy on September 22, 1930.
59	Mayor Murphy	Frank Murphy	September 23, 1930 – May 10, 1933	Democratic	Frank Murphy was a recorder's court judge in the 1920s; his one-man grand jury investigation into city corruption raised his profile in the public's eye. He ran against Charles Bowles after the latter was recalled in 1930 and was elected, and was re-elected for a full term the following year. Frank Murphy resigned the mayorship in 1933 when Franklin D. Roosevelt named him Governor-General of the Philippines. He later went on to become Governor of Michigan, Attorney General of the United States, and finished his career as an Associate Justice of the Supreme Court of the United States.
60		Frank Couzens	May 10, 1933 – September 8, 1933	Republican	Frank Couzens was the son of James J. Couzens. After a stint on the Detroit Street Railways Commission, Couzens ran for a seat on the Detroit City Council, and garnered enough votes to become council president. When Frank Murphy resigned in 1933 to become governor of the Philippines, Couzens became acting mayor. He resigned the mayor's office on September 8, 1933, to concentrate on receiving the Republican nomination for the office. He was then elected mayor twice, filling out four years in office.
61		John W. Smith	September 8, 1933 – January 2, 1934	Republican	(see above)
62		Frank Couzens	January 2, 1934 – January 3, 1938	Republican	(see above)
63		Richard Reading	January 4, 1938 – January 1, 1940	Republican	Reading was appointed City Assessor in 1921, moved to City Controller in 1924, and was elected City Clerk in 1926. He stayed in the office of clerk until 1939, when he ran for mayor, ultimately defeating Patrick H. O'Brien by nearly two-to-one. However, once in the office, Reading engaged in graft, selling protection to numbers racketeers and promotions to police officers. This corruption was exposed as the campaign for the next mayoral election was gearing up, and Reading was crushed by Edward Jeffries. Shortly after leaving office, Reading was indicted on charges of accepting bribes and conspiring to protect Detroit's gambling rackets, and was sentenced to four to five years in prison.
64		Edward Jeffries	January 2, 1940 – January 5, 1948	Republican	Edward Jeffries was the son of Recorder's Court Judge and civic servant Edward Jeffries Sr. The younger Jeffries ran for Detroit City Council in 1932, and served on that body for four terms, from 1932 to 1940, serving the last two as City Council president. In 1940, Jeffries moved to the mayors office, winning four consecutive terms before losing to Eugene Van Antwerp in 1947. Jeffries was elected once more to serve on the City Council, beginning in 1950, but died in office shortly thereafter.
65		Eugene Van Antwerp	January 6, 1948 – January 2, 1950	Democratic	Eugene Van Antwerp was a civil engineer and a captain in the United States Army Corps of Engineers during World War I. He served in the Detroit City Council from 1932 to 1948, when he moved to the mayor's office. During that time, he also served a stint as the commander of the Veterans of Foreign Wars in 1938–39. Van Antwerp served a single term as mayor, moving back to the council in a special election in 1950 and remaining on the council until his death in 1962.
66		Albert Cobo	January 3, 1950 – September 12, 1957	Republican	Albert Cobo worked for Burroughs Corporation when, in 1933, the company "loaned" him to the city of Detroit to help with their financial crisis. Cobo never returned to Burroughs, instead running for the position of city treasurer in 1935, and serving seven consecutive terms. In 1949, he ran for mayor, winning that election and the next two (the last for a four-year term). Cobo ran for governor in 1956, but was handily beaten by G. Mennen Williams, his first loss after ten successful citywide campaigns. He declined to run for a fourth term as mayor, but died in office near the end of his term.
67		Louis Miriani	September 12, 1957 – January 2, 1962	Republican	Louis Miriani was elected to the Detroit City Council in 1947, and was council president from 1949 to 1957. After Albert Cobo died in office, Miriani served as acting mayor for the remainder of Cobo's term and was elected himself beginning in 1958. He served until 1961, when he was defeated for reelection by Jerome Cavanagh in an upset fueled largely by African-American support for Cavanagh. Miriani was again elected to the City Council in 1965. In 1969, he was convicted of federal tax evasion and served approximately 10 months in prison. He retired from politics after his conviction. Most recent Republican to serve as mayor of Detroit.
68		Jerome Cavanagh	January 2, 1962 – January 5, 1970	Democratic	The 1961 mayoral race was the first campaign undertaken by the young Jerome Cavanagh. He was perceived as an easy opponent for incumbent Louis Miriani, but with the backing of the city's African-American community, Cavanagh pulled off a stunning upset. Cavanagh was initially a popular mayor, appointing a reformer to be chief of police and marching arm-in-arm with Martin Luther King Jr. down Woodward Avenue. Cavanagh was reelected overwhelmingly in 1965, and in 1966 was elected president of both the United States Conference of Mayors and the National League of Cities. However, his reputation was dimmed by the 1967 riots, and he declined to run for a third term. In 1974, Cavanagh ran for Governor of Michigan, but lost in the primary. In 1979, he died from a heart attack, at age 51.
69		Roman Gribbs	January 6, 1970 – January 1, 1974	Democratic	Gribbs served as an assistant prosecutor from 1956 to 1964 and as sheriff of Wayne County in 1968 and 1969 before deciding to run for mayor. Gribbs served a single term as mayor, declining to seek re-election. After leaving office, he served as a circuit court judge from 1975 to 1982 and on the Michigan Court of Appeals from 1982 until his retirement in 2000.
70	Mayor Young	Coleman Young	January 1, 1974 – January 3, 1994	Democratic	Coleman Young was born in Tuscaloosa, Alabama, but moved to Detroit when he was five. During World War II, Young served as one of the Tuskegee Airmen, and returned to Detroit at the end of the war. He ran for state representative in 1959 but lost; in 1963 he ran for state senate and won. He served in the senate until 1974 when he moved into the mayor's office, becoming the city's first African-American mayor. Young remained as mayor for a record five terms, becoming the longest-serving mayor in city history. During his tenure, Young was the vice chairman of the Democratic National Committee from 1977 to 1981 and chair of the Democratic National Convention Platform Committee in 1980. He also led the United States Conference of Mayors and the National Conference of Democratic Mayors at various times. With his health deteriorating, Young declined to seek a sixth term.
71	Mayor Archer	Dennis Archer	January 3, 1994 – December 31, 2001	Democratic	Dennis Archer practiced law privately and as a law professor before being named to the Michigan Supreme Court in 1985 by Michigan governor James Blanchard. The following year, Archer was elected to a full eight-year term. He served two terms as mayor of Detroit, during which he was president of the National Conference of Democratic Mayors and president of the National League of Cities. Archer declined to seek a third term. After stepping down from the mayor's office, he was elected chair of Dickinson Wright and served a year as president of the American Bar Association.
72	Mayor Kilpatrick	Kwame Kilpatrick	January 1, 2002 – September 18, 2008	Democratic	Kwame Kilpatrick is the son of former county commissioner Bernard Kilpatrick and former Michigan legislator and United States congresswoman Carolyn Cheeks Kilpatrick. The younger Kilpatrick began his political career by running for the Michigan House seat his mother vacated in 1996, and was minority leader in the state house by 2001. Kilpatrick was twice elected mayor, but resigned office in 2008 after a corruption scandal; he was later sentenced to 28 years in prison.
73	Mayor Cockrel	Kenneth Cockrel Jr.	September 18, 2008 – May 11, 2009	Democratic.	Ken Cockrel is the son of the late Kenneth Cockrel Sr., a civil rights activist and Detroit City Council member. The younger Cockrel also ran for city council, and was first elected in 1997. Cockrel was elected council president in 2005, and assumed the mayorship after Kwame Kilpatrick's resignation in 2008. However, Cockrel lost the ensuing special election to Dave Bing, and returned to his seat on the city council. Cockrel was re-elected to the city council later in the year.
74	Mayor Bing	Dave Bing	May 11, 2009 – December 31, 2013	Democratic	Dave Bing played 12 seasons in the National Basketball Association (9 with the Detroit Pistons) and was elected to the Basketball Hall of Fame. After retiring from basketball, Bing started an auto parts manufacturing business, the Bing Group. He moved to Detroit specifically to run for mayor, and won the special election in May 2009 to fill the remainder of Kwame Kilpatrick's term, and was elected to a full term later in the year.
75	Mayor Duggan	Mike Duggan	January 1, 2014 – December 31, 2025	Democratic	Mike Duggan served as the deputy County Executive and prosecutor for Wayne County, and was president and CEO of the Detroit Medical Center from 2004 to 2012. He resigned to run for Detroit mayor; after failing to qualify for the primary ballot, he waged a successful write-in campaign to qualify for the run-off election, where he beat Benny Napoleon. Duggan is the first white mayor since Roman Gribbs, who served when the city was still predominantly white.
76	Mayor Sheffield	Mary Sheffield	January 1, 2026 – present	Democratic	Mary Sheffield is the daughter of civil rights activist and pastor Horace Sheffield III. She won election to the Detroit city council in 2013, becoming the youngest person to hold that office at 26. She was re-elected twice, and became city council president in 2022. She was elected mayor in 2025, becoming the first woman mayor of the city.

== See also ==
- Timeline of Detroit
- History of Detroit
- Decline of Detroit
