= Joseph A. Martin =

American politician

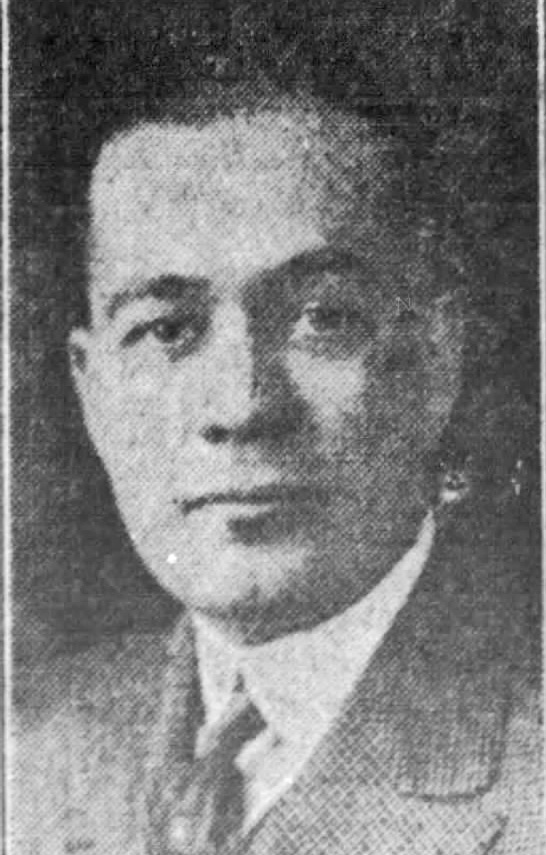

50th Mayor of Detroit, Michigan
- In office June 10, 1924 – August 2, 1924
- Preceded by: Frank Ellsworth Doremus
- Succeeded by: John C. Lodge

Personal details
- Born: 1888
- Died: October 17, 1928 (aged 39–40) Detroit, Michigan

Joseph A. Martin (1888 – October 17, 1928) was the mayor of Detroit, Michigan in 1924.

== Biography ==
Joseph A. Martin was born on June 26, 1888. He was Commissioner of Public Works for Detroit from 1920 to 1923. He served as acting mayor in 1924 after Frank Ellsworth Doremus resigned for health reasons. Martin resigned to concentrate on running for mayor but lost a three-way race to John W. Smith (with Charles Bowles as the write-in candidate).

Joseph A. Martin died on October 17, 1928 when he was 40.

Political offices
Preceded by Frank Ellsworth Doremus	Mayor of Detroit; June 10, 1924 – August 2, 1924	Succeeded by John C. Lodge
