= James Couzens =

American politician (1872–1936)

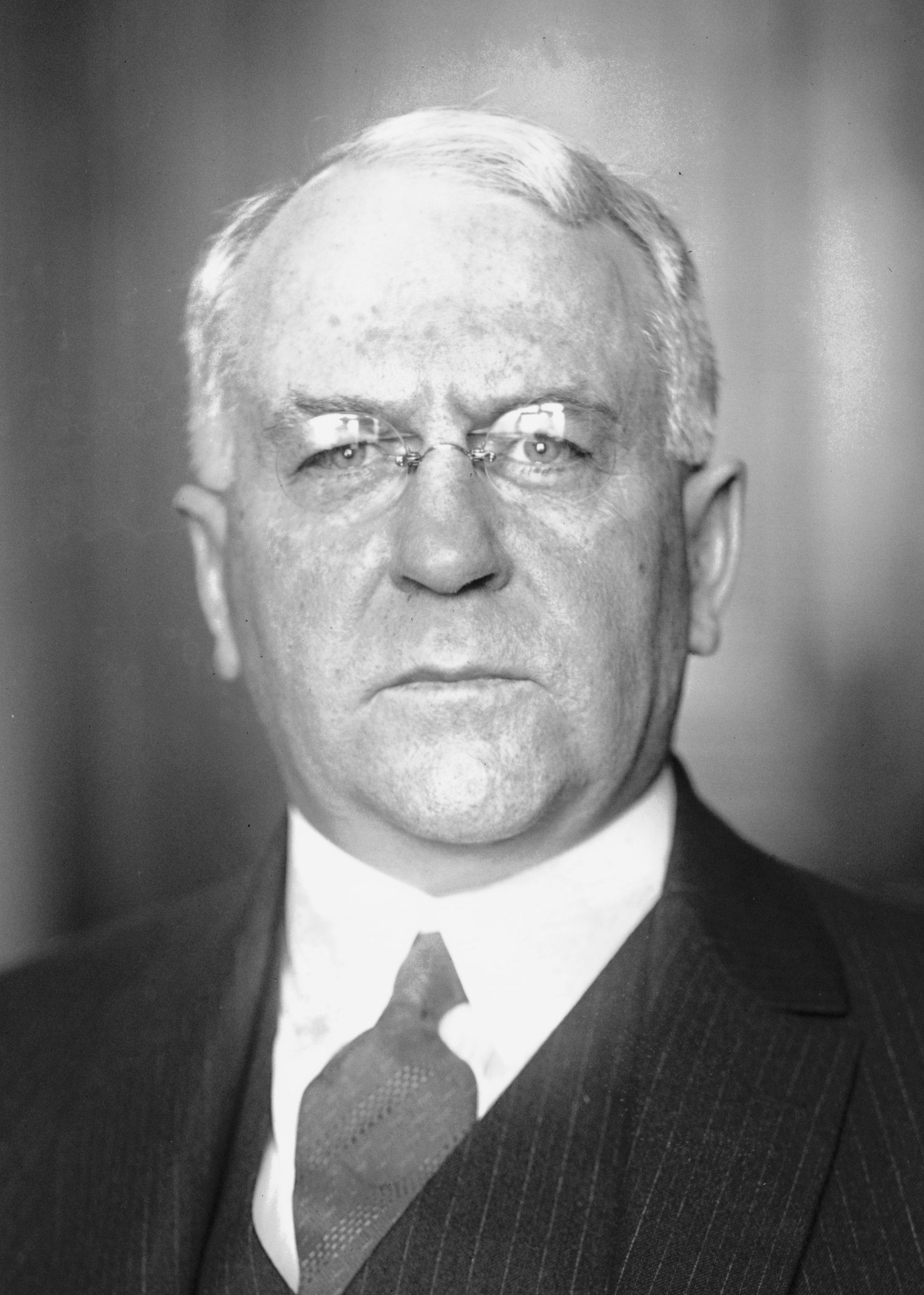
- Couzens in 1922

United States Senator from Michigan
- In office November 29, 1922 – October 22, 1936
- Preceded by: Truman H. Newberry
- Succeeded by: Prentiss M. Brown

47th Mayor of Detroit
- In office 1919–1922
- Preceded by: Oscar Marx
- Succeeded by: John C. Lodge

7th Commissioner of the Detroit Police Department
- In office September 30, 1916 – July 5, 1918
- Preceded by: Ernest Marquardt
- Succeeded by: John Gillespie

Personal details
- Born: August 26, 1872 Chatham, Ontario, Canada
- Died: October 22, 1936 (aged 64) Detroit, Michigan, U.S.
- Party: Republican
- Children: 6 (including Frank)

James Joseph Couzens (August 26, 1872 – October 22, 1936) was an American businessman, politician and philanthropist. He served as mayor of Detroit (1919–1922) and U.S. senator from Michigan (1922–1936). Prior to entering politics he served as vice president and general manager of the Ford Motor Company.

== Early life and career ==
Couzens was born in Chatham, Ontario, Canada in 1872, the son of soapmaker James and Emma Clift Couzens. He attended the public schools of Chatham and spent time at a business college. He moved to Detroit, Michigan in 1890 and worked as a railroad car checker for the New York Central Railroad from 1890 to 1897. Couzens' diligence at the railroad was noticed by Alexander Y. Malcomson, who hired the young man as a clerk in his coal business. Couzens worked for Malcomson from 1897 to 1903.

In 1898, Couzens married Margaret Manning. The couple had six children: a son born in 1899 who died in infancy; Homer Couzens, born in 1900; Frank Couzens (later mayor of Detroit), born in 1902; Madeline, born in 1904; Margo, born in 1910, and Edith, born in 1911.

== Association with Henry Ford ==
In 1902, Henry Ford was organizing the Ford Motor Company; Alexander Malcomson was a major stakeholder in the company. The two were seeking additional stockholders; Couzens borrowed heavily and invested $2,500 in the new firm. Ford Motor Company was founded in 1903 with John S. Gray as president, Ford as vice-president, Malcomson as treasurer, and Couzens as secretary. Couzens took over the business management of the new firm for an annual salary of $2,400. In 1906, Gray died and Malcomson was eased out of the business, and Couzens became vice president and general manager of the company. The company made both Ford and Couzens wealthy, due in no small part to Couzens's business acumen. However, the two men gradually grew apart, and in 1915 Couzens resigned his position as general manager, although he retained a seat on the board. In 1919, Ford purchased Couzens's shares in the company for $30,000,000.

He was inducted into the Automotive Hall of Fame in 2012.

== Detroit work and political career ==
James Couzens was president of the Bank of Detroit and director of the Detroit Trust Company. He was commissioner of street railways 1913-1915 and commissioner of the metropolitan police department 1916–1918. He was mayor of Detroit 1919–1922. As mayor, Couzens installed municipal street railways.

== Senatorial career ==
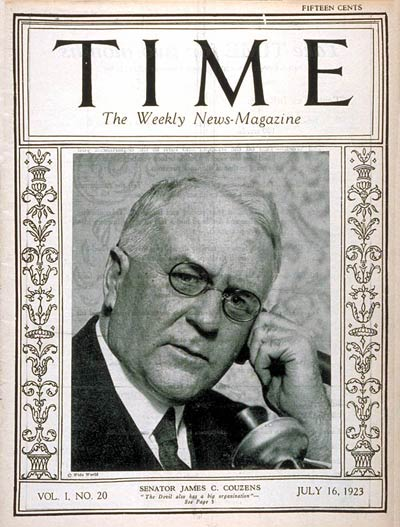
Time cover, 16 Jul 1923

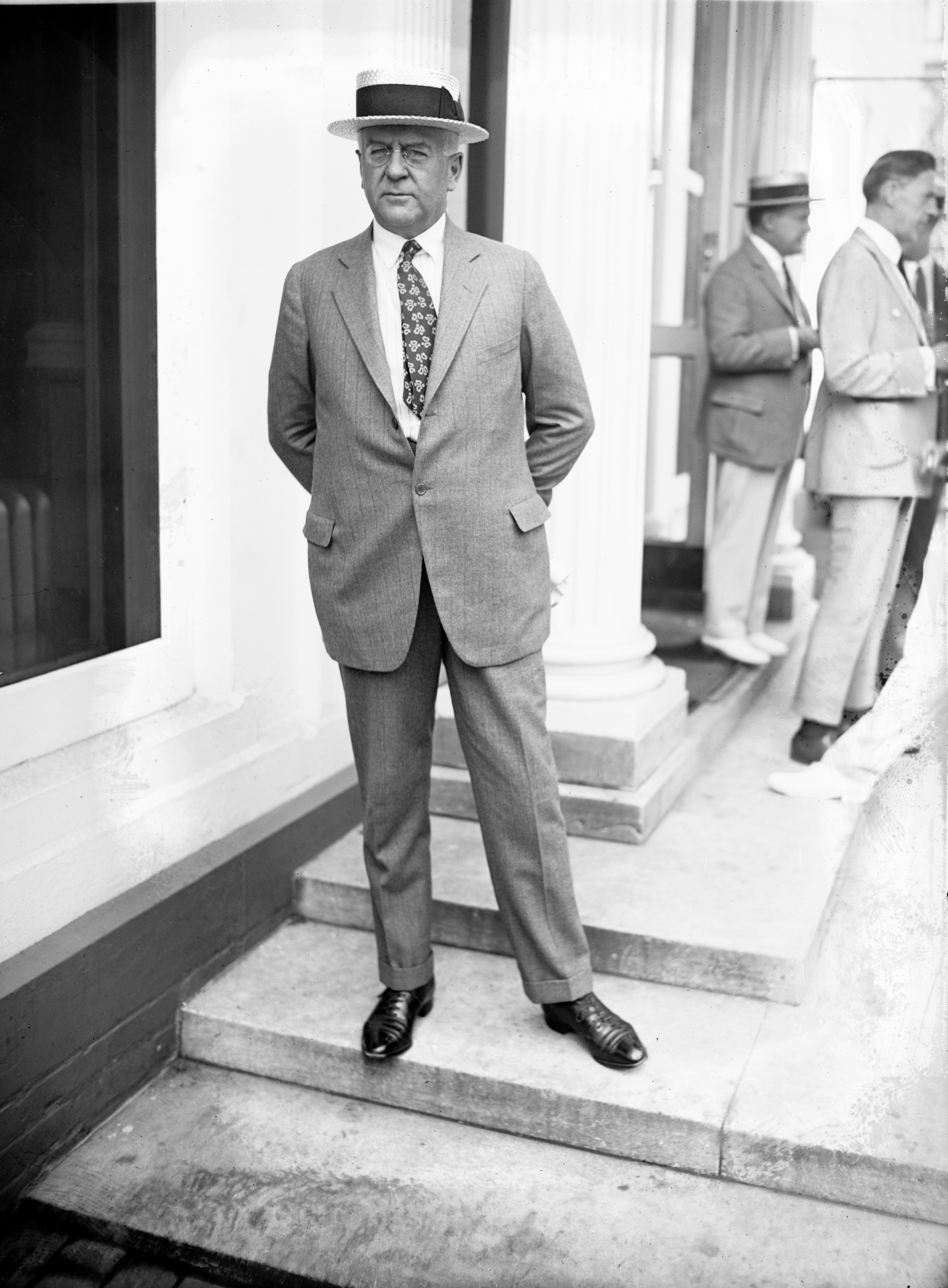
Couzens in 1924

Couzens was appointed November 29, 1922, as a Republican to the United States Senate to fill the vacancy caused by the resignation of Truman H. Newberry. This appointment was confirmed by his special election on November 4, 1924 to serve the remainder of Newberry's term, at which time he was also elected to a full term commencing March 4, 1925. He was reelected in 1930, serving in total from November 29, 1922, until his death on October 22, 1936. He was an unsuccessful candidate for renomination in 1936, the loss generally attributed to Couzens's support for Roosevelt's New Deal programs. He was chairman of the U.S. Senate Committee on Civil Service in the Sixty-ninth Congress, the U.S. Senate Committee on Education and Labor in the Sixty-ninth and Seventieth Congresses, the U.S. Senate Committee on Interstate Commerce in the Seventy-first and Seventy-second Congresses. Couzens' actions in Congress generally followed those of the Progressive Republicans, advocating acts such as high graduated income tax and public ownership of utilities.

Couzens died in Detroit on October 22, 1936 and is interred in Woodlawn Cemetery there. Despite their falling out, Henry Ford served as one of his pallbearers.

== Philanthropy ==
Couzens established the Children's Fund of Michigan with a $10,000,000 grant. He also gave $1,000,000 for relief in Detroit and began a fund to make loans to the physically handicapped. Under Dr Frank Norton, Dr Kenneth Richard Gibson and their secretary, Kathryn Hutchison, the Children's Fund, among other things, provided free health and dental work for indigent Detroit children. The Fund was set up with a 25-year life span, and the project ended in the mid-1950s.

In response to the Bath School Disaster, in which Andrew Kehoe, an embittered school board member and treasurer, killed 38 children by blowing up explosives he had planted in the basement of the Bath Consolidated School in Bath Township, Michigan, Couzens gave $75,000 to fund rebuilding. The new school was dedicated as the "James Couzens Agricultural School".

He donated $600,000 to the University of Michigan for the building of a residence hall for female nursing students, near the University hospital and medical campus. It was named Couzens Hall in his honor. He also donated money to build a nurses’ home at the Farrand Training School in Detroit, a nurses’ training school associated with Harper Hospital. The building was completed in 1922, and at his request, the Board of Trustees named the new home McLaughlin Hall in honor of Emily A. McLaughlin, Principal of the Farrand Training School.

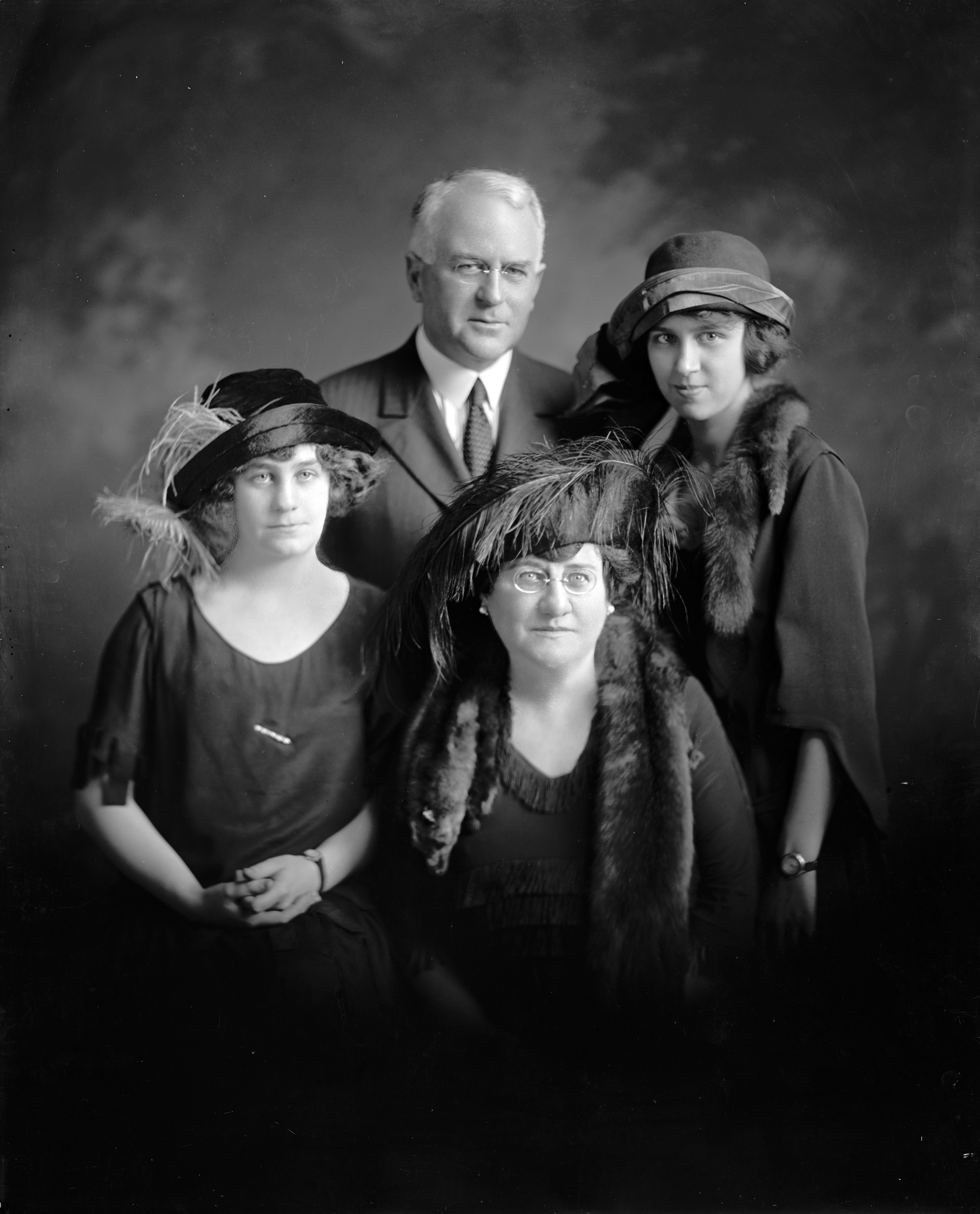
Couzens with his wife and daughters

In the 1930s, Couzens donated $1 million to Children's Hospital of Michigan, in response to a birthday request from his wife for "a simple box in which to keep my pearls". Couzens complied, including a note within the box describing the $1 million gift, stating "My dear, your new pearls will be all the children who are eventually treated there". Today, Children's Hospital of Michigan is part of the Detroit Medical Center.

Disturbed by the failures of low-income housing projects that came out of the depression, he funded an alternative. He contributed $550,000 of his own personal money, combined with $300,000 from Oakland Housing, to create a managed low-income housing project called Westacres, in West Bloomfield, Michigan. The project gave the low-income factory working man a chance to own a home. The homes were located on 1 acre of land and the owners were required to farm the land to provide food for their families when seasonal layoffs took place.

== Miscellaneous ==
Asked how to say his name, he told The Literary Digest: "Pronounced exactly as cousins."

On November 9, 1937, just over a year after his death, the Detroit City Council led by Mayor Frank Couzens—James Couzens' son—voted to rename the portion of Northwestern Highway in Detroit, which then began at Wyoming Avenue and continued into Oakland County, after James Couzens. (The segment of Northwestern Highway in Oakland County was not renamed, however.) When the John C. Lodge Freeway was extended from its terminus at Wyoming Avenue northwesterly along the route of James Couzens Highway–Northwestern Highway in the 1960s, the Lodge name was extended along the new freeway segment, while the freeway's service drives between Wyoming Avenue and Eight Mile Road (M-102) retained the James Couzens name.

== See also ==
- List of members of the United States Congress who died in office (1900–1949)
- List of United States senators born outside the United States

== Bibliography ==
- American National Biography
- Dictionary of American Biography
- Barnard, Harry. Independent Man: The Life of James Couzens, New York, Charles Scribner's Sons, 1958. Republished by Detroit: Wayne State University Press, 2002. ISBN 978-0-8143-3085-2
- U.S. Congress. Memorial Services Held in the House of Representatives of the United States, Together with Remarks Presented in Eulogy of James Couzens, Late a Senator from Michigan. 75th Cong., 1st sess., 1937. Washington, D.C.: Government Printing Office, 1938.

Party political offices
Preceded by Truman Handy Newberry	Republican nominee for U.S. Senator from Michigan (Class 2); 1924, 1930	Succeeded by Wilber M. Brucker
Political offices
Preceded by Oscar Marx	Mayor of Detroit; 1919–1922	Succeeded by John C. Lodge
U.S. Senate
Preceded by Truman H. Newberry	United States Senator (Class 2) from Michigan; 1922–1936	Succeeded by Prentiss M. Brown
Awards and achievements
Preceded by Mason M. Patrick	Cover of Time Magazine; 16 July 1923	Succeeded by Roy Asa Haynes
