= Richard Reading =

American politician

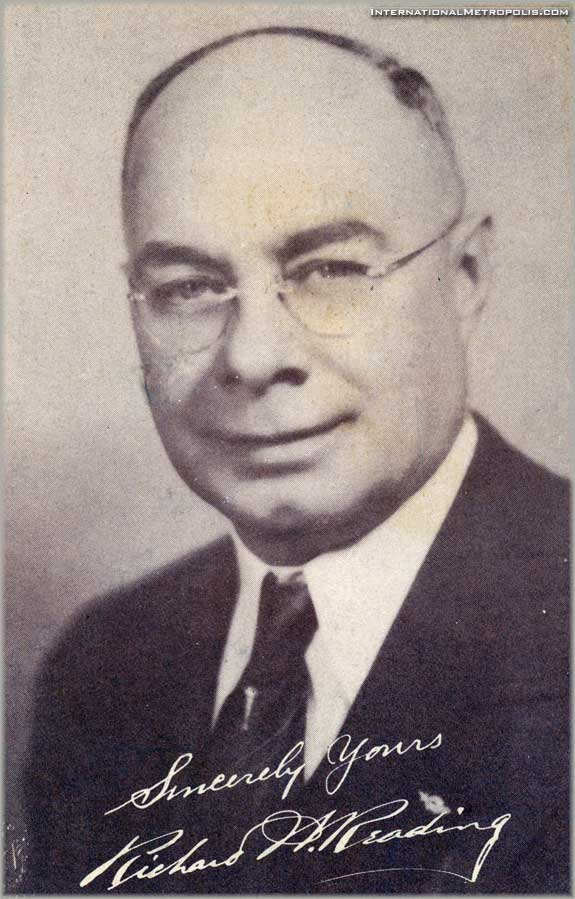

59th Mayor of Detroit
- In office January 4, 1938 – January 1, 1940
- Preceded by: Frank Couzens
- Succeeded by: Edward Jeffries

Detroit City Clerk
- In office 1926 – 1938

Detroit City Controller
- In office 1924 – 1926

Detroit City Assessor
- In office 1921 – 1924

Personal details
- Born: February 7, 1882 Detroit, Michigan, U.S.
- Died: December 9, 1952 (aged 70) Brighton, Michigan, U.S.
- Spouse: Blanche White (m. 1901)
- Children: 4
- Education: University of Detroit

Richard W. Reading (February 7, 1882 – December 9, 1952) was a Republican mayor of Detroit, Michigan from 1938 to 1940.

== Biography ==
Richard William Reading was born in Detroit on February 7, 1882, the son of Richard W. and Louise M. Reading. He was educated in the Detroit Public Schools and attended the University of Detroit.

Reading married Blanche White in 1901. The couple had four children.

Reading was for a time a semi-pro wrestler. He later worked variously as a printer, a newspaper executive, and a real estate dealer before entering public life in 1921.

Reading was appointed City Assessor in 1921, moved to City Controller in 1924, and was elected City Clerk in 1926. He stayed in the office of clerk until 1939, when he ran for mayor, ultimately defeating Patrick H. O'Brien by nearly two-to-one. However, once in the office, Reading engaged in graft, selling protection to a numbers racketeers and promotions to police officers. This corruption was exposed as the campaign for the next mayoral election was gearing up, and Reading was crushed by Edward Jeffries.

Shortly after leaving office, Reading was indicted on charges of accepting bribes and conspiring to protect Detroit's gambling rackets. He was sentenced to four to five years in prison, of which he served three.

Richard W. Reading died on December 9, 1952, in Brighton, Michigan.

Political offices
Preceded by Frank Couzens	Mayor of Detroit; January 4, 1938 – January 1, 1940	Succeeded by Edward Jeffries
