= National Conference of Democratic Mayors =

American representative body

The National Conference of Democratic Mayors, also known as the Democratic Mayors Association, is the representative body of city mayors in the United States affiliated to the Democratic Party, in the same way that the Democratic Governors Association represents state governors within the party. Founded in the 1970s, the National Conference of Democratic Mayors serves as a forum for Democratic mayors to discuss their goals and objectives with other mayors, party organizations, the Democratic National Committee, and private business partners. The organization provides resources for mayors such as talking points, newsletters, and fact sheets.

It participates in the U.S. Conference of Mayors and the National League of Cities.

Its executive committee, as of June 2024, is:

- President – Kate Gallego (Phoenix, Arizona)
- Vice president – Justin Bibb (Cleveland, Ohio)
- Vice president – Levar Stoney (Richmond, Virginia)
- Vice president – Todd Gloria (San Diego, California)
- Vice president – Paige Cognetti (Scranton, Pennsylvania)
- Secretary – Ron Nirenberg (San Antonio, Texas)
- Treasurer – Satya Rhodes-Conway (Madison, Wisconsin)
