= Eugene Van Antwerp =

American politician

Eugene Ignatius Van Antwerp
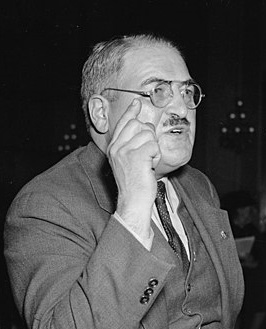
- Antwerp in 1920

61st Mayor of Detroit, Michigan
- In office January 6, 1948 – January 2, 1950
- Preceded by: Edward Jeffries
- Succeeded by: Albert Cobo

Member of the Detroit City Council
- In office 1950 – August 5, 1962
- Preceded by: Edward Jeffries
- In office January 1932 – January 1948

Personal details
- Born: July 26, 1889 Detroit, Michigan, U.S.
- Died: August 5, 1962 (aged 73) Detroit, Michigan, U.S.
- Spouse: Mary Frances McDevitt
- Education: University of Detroit
- Profession: Civil Engineer

Eugene Ignatius Van Antwerp (July 26, 1889 – August 5, 1962) was an American politician who served as the mayor of Detroit, Michigan from 1948 to 1950.

== Biography ==
He was born on July 26, 1889, the son of Eugene C. Van Antwerp and Cecelia Renaud. His father was of Flemish descent and his mother was of French ancestry.

He was educated in parochial schools and then at the University of Detroit and worked as an instructor in English at Gonzaga University in 1910–1911. He returned to Detroit, working briefly at the Detroit Police Department before going to work as a civil engineer. He did engineering work first for the Michigan Central Railroad and then for the Grand Trunk Railroad.

Van Antwerp served as a captain in 16th Regiment of Engineers (Railway) from Detroit in the United States Army Corps of Engineers during World War I, and was among the first members of the Allied Expeditionary Force to land in France, serving in 1917–1919. He returned to his position with Grand Trunk after the war. He was chief engineer for the National Survey Service from 1926 to 1928, after which he went into private practice as an engineer and surveyor. He died on August 5, 1962.

== Family ==
In 1911, Van Antwerp married Mary Frances McDevitt. The couple had eleven children: Dolores, Pauline, Loretta, Eugene, Joseph, Gore, Joan, Agnes, George, Dacia, and Daniel.

== Politics ==
Van Antwerp, a Democrat, was elected to the Detroit City Council in 1932. He served continuously from 1932 to 1948, when he ran for mayor. During his time on the council, he ran unsuccessfully for county auditor in 1935 and served a stint as the commander of the Veterans of Foreign Wars in 1938–39.

Van Antwerp served a single term as mayor, beating Edward Jeffries in 1947 but losing in the primary in 1949. He returned to the City Council in 1950, winning a special election in November of that year to replace Edward Jeffries after the latter's death. During his second time on the council, he ran unsuccessfully for state highway commissioner in 1952 and for United States Congress in 1955. Van Antwerp served on the council continuously until his death.

Political offices
Preceded by Edward Jeffries	Mayor of Detroit; January 6, 1948 - January 2, 1950	Succeeded by Albert Cobo
