= Frank E. Doremus =

American politician (1865–1947)

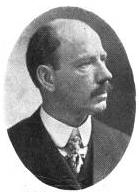

49th Mayor of Detroit, Michigan
- In office 1923–1924
- Preceded by: John C. Lodge
- Succeeded by: Joseph A. Martin

Member of the U.S. House of Representatives from Michigan's 1st district
- In office March 4, 1911 – March 3, 1921
- Preceded by: Edwin C. Denby
- Succeeded by: George P. Codd

Chair of the Democratic Congressional Campaign Committee
- In office 1913–1917
- Preceded by: James T. Lloyd
- Succeeded by: Scott Ferris

Member of the Michigan House of Representatives from the Ionia County 1st district
- In office 1890–1892

Personal details
- Born: Frank Ellsworth Doremus; August 31, 1865 Venango County, Pennsylvania
- Died: September 4, 1947 (aged 82) Howell, Michigan
- Resting place: Roseland Park, Berkley, Michigan

Frank Ellsworth Doremus (August 31, 1865 – September 4, 1947) was an American politician who was the 49th mayor of Detroit and a member of the U.S. House of Representatives from Michigan.

== Early life ==
Doremus was born in Venango County, Pennsylvania, on August 31, 1865, the son of Sylvester and Sarah Peake Doremus. The Doremus family moved to Ovid, Michigan, in 1866, and then to Portland, Michigan, in 1872. Frank Doremus attended the public schools of Portland and graduated from Detroit College of Law.

In 1882, Doremus began work at the Portland Observer, then moved on to take charge of the Pewamo Plain Dealer and established the Portland Review in 1885, editing it until 1899.

Doremus married Libby Hatley in 1890. The couple had one child, Robert.

== Politics ==
Doremus was postmaster of Portland from 1895 to 1899. He was elected township clerk in 1888 and re-elected in 1889. In 1890, Doremus was elected to the Michigan House of Representatives from Ionia County's 1st District serving from 1890 to 1892.

He was admitted to the bar and commenced practice in Detroit in 1899. He was assistant corporation counsel of Detroit from 1903 to 1907 and city comptroller 1907-1910.

In 1910, Doremus defeated incumbent Republican Edwin C. Denby to be elected as a Democrat from Michigan's 1st congressional district to the Sixty-second and to the four succeeding Congresses, serving from March 4, 1911, to March 3, 1921, and was elected chair of the Democratic Congressional Campaign Committee in 1913. He was a delegate to Democratic National Convention from Michigan in 1916 and 1920. He served as mayor of Detroit in 1923, defeating former Detroit Police Commissioner Dr. James W. Inches in the general election, until he resigned the following year due to ill-health.

He resumed the practice of law in Fowlerville, Michigan. Frank Ellsworth Doremus died in Howell, Michigan, and was interred in Roseland Park, Berkley, Michigan.

U.S. House of Representatives
Preceded by Edwin Denby	United States Representative for the 1st congressional district of Michigan; 1911–1921	Succeeded by George P. Codd
Political offices
Preceded by John C. Lodge	Mayor of Detroit; 1923–1924	Succeeded by Joseph A. Martin
