= George P. Codd =

American politician

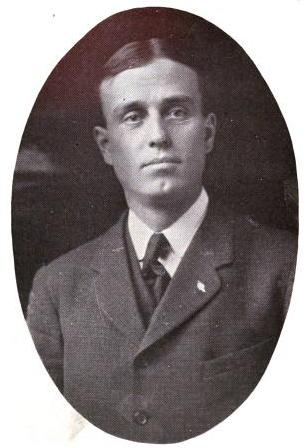

42nd Mayor of Detroit, Michigan
- In office 1905–1906
- Preceded by: William C. Maybury
- Succeeded by: William Barlum Thompson

Member of the U.S. House of Representatives from Michigan's 1st district
- In office March 4, 1921 – March 3, 1923
- Preceded by: Frank E. Doremus
- Succeeded by: Robert H. Clancy

Personal details
- Born: December 7, 1869 Detroit, Michigan, U.S.
- Died: February 16, 1927 (aged 57) Detroit, Michigan, U.S.
- Party: Republican
- Spouse: Kathleen Warner
- Education: University of Michigan
- Profession: Lawyer

George Pierre Codd (December 7, 1869 – February 16, 1927) was a politician from the U.S. state of Michigan.

== Biography ==
Codd was born on December 7, 1869, in Detroit, Michigan, the son of George C. Codd and Eunice Lawrence. His father had a long history of public service, including stints as postmaster of Detroit, sheriff of Wayne County, and as a member of the Detroit City Council.

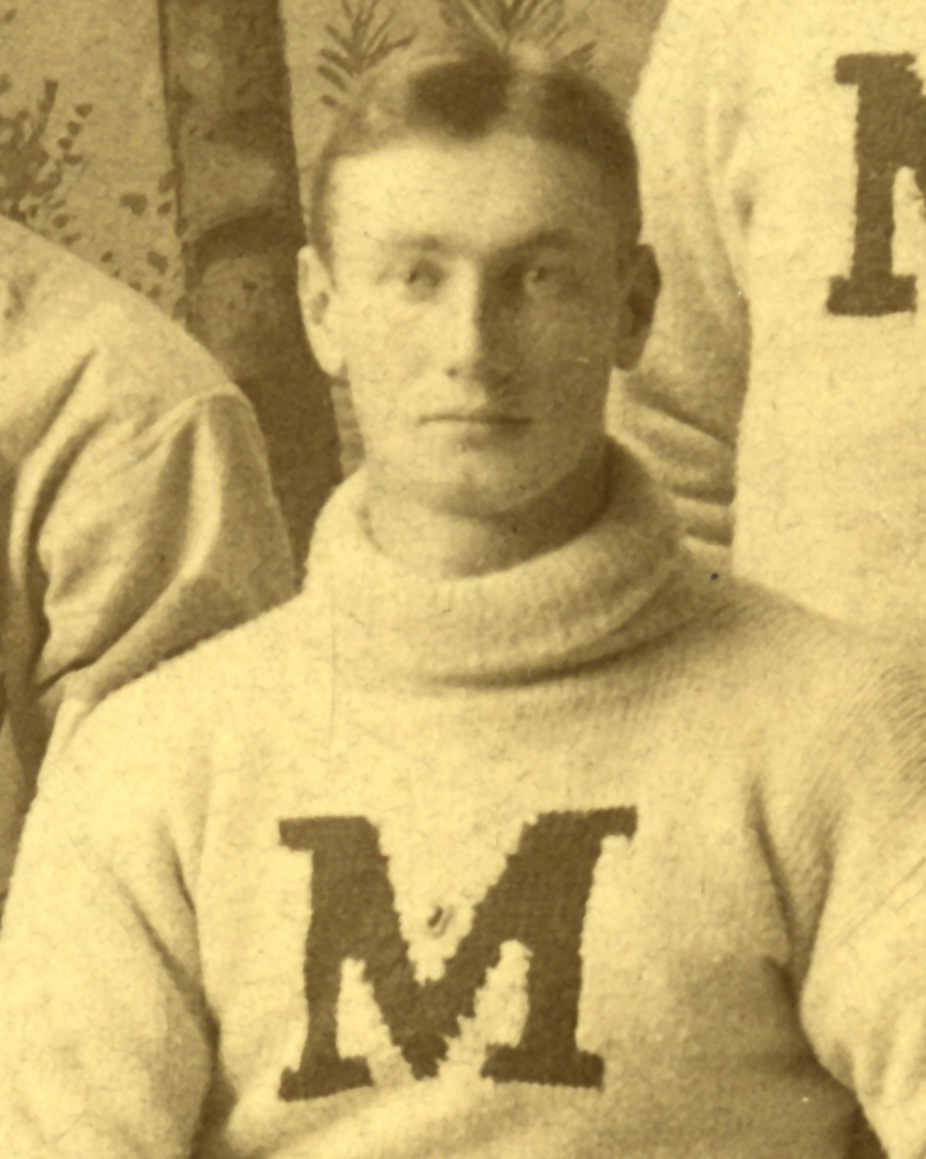
Codd cropped from the 1891 Michigan baseball team portrait

The younger Codd attended the public schools in Detroit and graduated from the University of Michigan at Ann Arbor in 1891 with a Bachelor of Arts. While attending Michigan, Codd played for the Michigan Wolverines baseball team as a pitcher from 1888 to 1892. He was the captain of the Michigan baseball team for a record-setting four consecutive years from 1888 to 1891.

After graduating, Codd began the study of law and was admitted to the bar in 1892 and commenced practice in Detroit in 1893.

Codd first worked at the law first of Griffin, Warner, and Hunt. He was assistant city attorney from 1894 to 1897, then became a partner in the firm of Warner, Codd, and Warner with Carlos E. and Williard E. Warner. This partnership lasted until Carlos's death in 1901, after which Codd began his own firm.

Codd married Kathleen Warner, daughter of Carlos E. Warner, in 1894. The couple had three children: John W., George C., and Kathleen.

== Politics ==
Codd was a member of the board of aldermen from 1902 to 1904. He was elected Mayor of Detroit and served from 1905 to 1906, but his support for compromise fares for the Detroit Street Railway turned public opinion against him, and he was unsuccessful in his bid for re-election. He was a delegate to the 1908 Republican National Convention. He served as regent of the University of Michigan in 1910 and 1911. He was appointed circuit judge of Wayne County serving the 3rd Circuit from 1911 to 1921.

Codd was elected as a Republican from Michigan's 1st congressional district to the 67th United States Congress, serving from March 4, 1921, to March 3, 1923. In 1922, he declined to be a candidate for re-nomination and resumed the practice of law.

George P. Codd was again elected circuit judge of Wayne County in 1924 and served until his death on February 26, 1927. He was interred in Elmwood Cemetery.

Political offices
| Preceded by William C. Maybury | Mayor of Detroit; 1905–1906 | Succeeded by William Barlum Thompson |
U.S. House of Representatives
| Preceded by Frank E. Doremus | United States Representative for the 1st congressional district of Michigan; 1921–1923 | Succeeded by Robert H. Clancy |
