= John C. Lodge =

American politician (1862–1950)

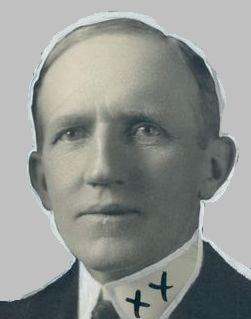

48th, 51st, and 53rd Mayor of Detroit
- In office December 5, 1922 – April 9, 1923; Acting
- Preceded by: James J. Couzens
- Succeeded by: Frank Doremus
- In office August 2, 1924 – November 21, 1924; Acting
- Preceded by: Joseph A. Martin
- Succeeded by: John W. Smith
- In office 1927–1929
- Preceded by: John W. Smith
- Succeeded by: Charles Bowles

Personal details
- Born: August 12, 1862 Detroit, Michigan
- Died: February 6, 1950 (aged 87) Detroit, Michigan
- Resting place: Elmwood Cemetery, Detroit
- Party: Republican

John Christian Lodge (August 12, 1862 – February 6, 1950) was an American politician who served as the mayor of Detroit, Michigan from 1922 to 1923, in 1924, and from 1927 to 1929. He spent over 30 years on the Detroit City Council.

== Early life ==
John C. Lodge was born in Detroit on August 12, 1862, to Dr. Edwin A. Lodge and Christiana Lodge (née Hanson). He attended the Michigan Military Academy in 1881. He worked as a reporter and city editor for the Detroit Free Press from 1889 to 1896. In 1897 he entered the lumber industry, and was connected with the Dwight Lumber Company.

== Political career ==
Lodge was the chief clerk for the Wayne County Auditors from 1897 to 1905, then served for two years as the secretary to mayor George P. Codd. He was a member of the Michigan House of Representatives as a Republican from Wayne County's 1st district, from 1909 to 1910, and served as chair of the Wayne County Board of Supervisors. He was a member of the Detroit City Council beginning in 1910, and held the position for 17 years before being elected mayor, nine of them as council president. During that time, Lodge served twice as acting mayor: once from December 5, 1922, to April 9, 1923, after James J. Couzens's resignation to assume the office of United States Senator, and once from August 2, 1924, to November 21, 1924, after Joseph A. Martin's resignation. In 1927, Lodge was elected mayor in his own right, serving from 1927 to 1929. He was defeated in his quest for renomination in 1929. After his stint as mayor, Lodge returned to the city council, serving there from 1932 to 1947.

== Personal life ==
Lodge was the great-uncle of aviator Charles Lindbergh. Before Lindbergh's famed transatlantic flight, he approached Lodge for funding. Lodge declined, convinced his grandnephew faced certain death. Lindbergh would go on to receive funding from supporters in St. Louis, rather than Detroit.

Lodge died on February 6, 1950, and is buried at Elmwood Cemetery in Detroit. After his death, the John C. Lodge Freeway (M-10) in Detroit was named after him.

== Bibliography ==
- Lodge, John Christian (1949). I Remember Detroit. Detroit: Wayne University Press. ISBN 0-7812-8581-X. OCLC 415215.

Political offices
Preceded by James J. Couzens	Mayor of Detroit; 1922–1923	Succeeded by Frank Doremus
Preceded by Joseph A. Martin	Mayor of Detroit; 1924	Succeeded by John W. Smith
Preceded by John W. Smith	Mayor of Detroit; 1927–1929	Succeeded by Charles Bowles
