= John W. Smith (Detroit mayor) =

American politician

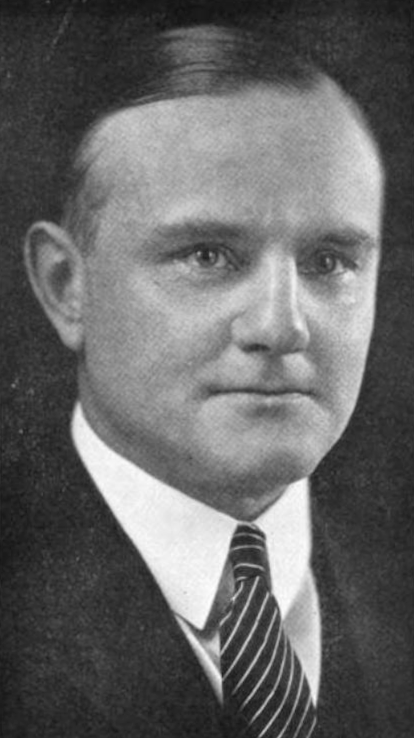

52nd and 57th Mayor of Detroit
- In office 1924–1928
- Preceded by: John C. Lodge
- Succeeded by: John C. Lodge
- In office 1933
- Preceded by: Frank Couzens
- Succeeded by: Frank Couzens

Personal details
- Born: April 12, 1882 Detroit, Michigan
- Died: June 17, 1942 (aged 60) Detroit, Michigan

John W. Smith (April 12, 1882 – June 17, 1942) was an American politician who was a long-time member of the Detroit City Council and was twice mayor of Detroit, Michigan.

== Early life ==
John W. Smith was born in Detroit on April 12, 1882, the son of John W. and Gertrude Wax Smith. His father died when Smith was five years old, leaving the family poor. He began working as a newsboy when he was six years old. He quit school in the fifth grade, and worked as a pin-setter in a bowling alley and a newsboy, furthering his education on his own at the library. He started boxing at a young age, then joined the army at the age of fifteen to fight in the Spanish–American War, staying on to fight in the Philippines for some time.

On his return to Detroit in 1901, Smith attended the University of Detroit for a year, simultaneously becoming a journeyman pipefitter. He next joined the Detroit Shipbuilding Company as a pipefitter.

Smith married Marie General; the couple had two children: Dorothy and John W. Jr.

== Politics ==
Smith became active in Republican politics in 1908, and in 1911 was appointed Deputy State Labor Commissioner by Governor Chase S. Osborn. Two years later he became a deputy at the Wayne County Sheriff's Department. He also served as a deputy US Marshall and deputy county clerk. He was elected to the Michigan State Senate in 1920, and was appointed postmaster of Detroit by Warren G. Harding in 1922.

In 1924, Smith won election as Detroit mayor after Frank Ellsworth Doremus's resignation, continuing in the office until 1928. Smith later served on the Detroit City Council for most of the time from 1932 until his death in 1942. He served one more time as mayor in 1933, acting to fill out the end of Frank Murphy's term, after the latter had resigned and his successor, Frank Couzens, also resigned to concentrate on running for election as mayor. Smith ran for mayor off-and-on, including in 1930 and 1936, and for governor in 1934, but was not elected.

John W. Smith died on June 17, 1942.

Political offices
Preceded by John C. Lodge	Mayor of Detroit; 1924–1928	Succeeded by John C. Lodge
Preceded by Frank Couzens	Mayor of Detroit; 1933	Succeeded by Frank Couzens
