= Jerry Buckley (journalist) =

American radio journalist (1891–1930)

- Born: Gerald Emmett Buckley; April 5, 1891
- Died: July 23, 1930 (aged 39); Detroit, Michigan, U.S.
- Cause of death: Murdered
- Resting place: Mount Olivet Cemetery (Detroit)
- Other name: Jerry Buckley
- Citizenship: United States
- Occupation: Journalist/Radio Commentator
- Employer: WMBC
- Known for: Radio broadcasts, recall of Mayor Charles Bowles, murder

Gerald Emmett Buckley (April 5, 1891 – July 23, 1930) was an American radio commentator in Detroit, Michigan. He successfully campaigned for the recall of Mayor Charles Bowles in the wake of corruption allegations. Prior to his death, Buckley had served as an investigator for Henry Ford, and as a special investigator for the United States government.

== Early life and career ==
Jerry Buckley was born and spent his youth in Detroit's oldest neighborhood of Corktown. Buckley and his five siblings were raised by his mother, Anna “Annie” C. Buckley, a stay-at-home mom and Michigan native, and his father, Jeremiah “J.C.” Buckley, a moneyed landowner who emigrated from Canada to Michigan in 1884.

As a popular young adult, Jerry Buckley was known for his good looks and his “playboy” attitude, wooing women through his musical compositions and frequent presence in local nightclubs. In 1915, at the age of 24, Jerry Buckley married Michigan native Jeanette Logan, who gave birth to their only daughter, Rosemary, in 1918.

Buckley served as an investigator for Henry Ford, owner of Ford Motor Company, during the 1921 Newberry v. United States Supreme Court case, in which Ford legally challenged his defeat to Truman Newberry in the 1918 US Senate Election. Following his involvement in this case, Buckley continued to work as a government investigator on various legal cases, and occasionally channeled his investigative skills to aid his brother, George, in his legal work. Buckley's lifelong passion for song composition, combined with his investigative background, led him to a career in broadcasting, where he would become one of the first media celebrities of the burgeoning new medium of radio in the 1920s.

== Radio career ==
In 1928, Buckley began hosting a 6 p.m. nightly commentary program on Detroit radio station WMBC. Since the imposition of Prohibition in Michigan in 1917, Detroit had become a mecca for criminal activity, with prostitution, gambling and illegal alcohol production and consumption running rampant in the hands of mobsters, resulting in frequent gangland killings. Bootleggers operated extensively in Detroit, using nearby Windsor, Ontario as a conduit to funnel liquor illicitly into the US. Broadcasting from WMBC's studios on the top floor of the luxurious LaSalle Hotel, Buckley used his platform to enact a campaign against the rampant and rising crime in Detroit.

Buckley voiced the fears and outrage of his Detroit audience, whom he called the "Common Herd," openly criticizing and accusing city government officials of incompetence and attacking those whom he believed to be at fault for Detroit's rising crime rates. Buckley also served as an advocate for his "Common Herd," lobbying for various social causes such as social welfare programs, old-age pensions and providing jobs for the unemployed. This advocacy earned him his status as "the voice of the people" amidst the beginnings of the Depression Era, when unemployment figures skyrocketed in Detroit.

The success of Buckley's radio career came at a price; although beloved by the masses, he was also subject to numerous threats for his uninhibited critique of illicit activities in Detroit. When implored to hire a bodyguard to protect him, Buckley reportedly dismissed the suggestion, stating, "I get twenty threats a day. There is always someone who says I'll be killed." Despite his joking, Buckley kept a room at the LaSalle Hotel for emergency scenarios, and allegedly refused to leave the hotel on multiple occasions out of fear for his safety.

In the summer of 1930, Buckley's programs increasingly focused on claims of corruption among various Detroit officials, specifically targeting then-Mayor Charles Bowles.

=== Mayoral recall ===
The tension and violence that permeated throughout Detroit culminated in "Bloody July" in July 1930, during which ten men were killed by gangsters in the span of two weeks. Just before the start of Buckley's broadcast on the night of July 3, two Chicago-based dope peddlers, later identified as George Collins and William Cannon, were murdered just outside the LaSalle Hotel on Woodward Avenue. Buckley quickly gathered information regarding the double-homicide, and delivered detailed information to his audience on his broadcast that night. Infuriated by this murder, and the eight murders to follow, Buckley attacked the Detroit police department for its inability to quell this explosion of violence, and specifically targeted newly elected Mayor Charles Bowles for his inadequate response to the crime wave.

After two failed mayoral campaigns, Charles Bowles was elected Mayor of Detroit and took office in January 1930. Using the Prohibition Era to his advantage, Bowles ran as the "dry candidate" in the elections, thus winning the support of Detroit Protestants. While promoting law and order on the campaign trail, Bowles seemed incapable of quelling the rampant crime that plagued the city. Frustrated by Bowles' inaction, police commissioner Harold Emmons raided multiple illegal gambling operations in May 1930 while Bowles was out of town attending the Kentucky Derby. Bowles was outraged by this circumvention of his authority and fired Emmons, filling the position of police commissioner with his friend Thomas Wilcox. Buckley, mirroring the anger of the broader Detroit public, initiated a crusade against the perceived corruption of Bowles, which eventually led to a recall election.

Accounts of Buckley's position on the recall differ by source. Some sources claim that Buckley, despite his disdain for Mayor Bowles, actually opposed the recall, either because he considered it undemocratic or because he favored impeachment as a way to eliminate taxpayer expense. One account of the events claims that, despite his continuous anti-recall stance, Buckley mysteriously changed his position in his final broadcast before the recall vote, suddenly strongly favoring Bowles' recall, to the confusion of his audience.

Alternate accounts claim that Buckley vehemently supported and spearheaded the recall campaign and frequently took to the airwaves to encourage his listeners to fight for Bowles' recall. Some accounts claim that Buckley persisted in promoting the recall despite receiving a threatening phone call warning that he would be "taken for a long ride" if he did not cease his efforts. Other accounts claim that Buckley inexplicably altered his firm pro-recall stance in his final broadcast before the vote, reportedly cautioning his listeners, "Some of you have taken this recall business very seriously, and to you of that class we say, do not be so het up."

Days before the recall vote, a fellow reporter and friend of Buckley's, Riley Murray, received word that Buckley was in grave danger, although the source of the threat is still unknown. Murray implored Buckley to make a list of people who could potentially have motive to kill him. Murray hoped to secure this list in a locked box and to have Buckley broadcast its existence to dissuade his enemies from causing him harm. Murray's efforts were in vain; after considering Murray's proposition, Buckley allegedly stated, "I'll be alright."

On July 21, 1930, the day of the recall vote, Buckley broadcast from City Hall to inform his "Common Herd" about the latest vote developments. At the end of the vote, Buckley announced that Mayor Bowles had been recalled by a vote of 120,863 in favor of his removal to 89,907 opposed. This event garnered wide publicity both within and outside of Detroit, as no mayor of a large city had ever been recalled before this point. After Buckley's broadcast, his wife reportedly received an anonymous phone call during which she was warned, "Your husband won't be home tonight."

== Death ==
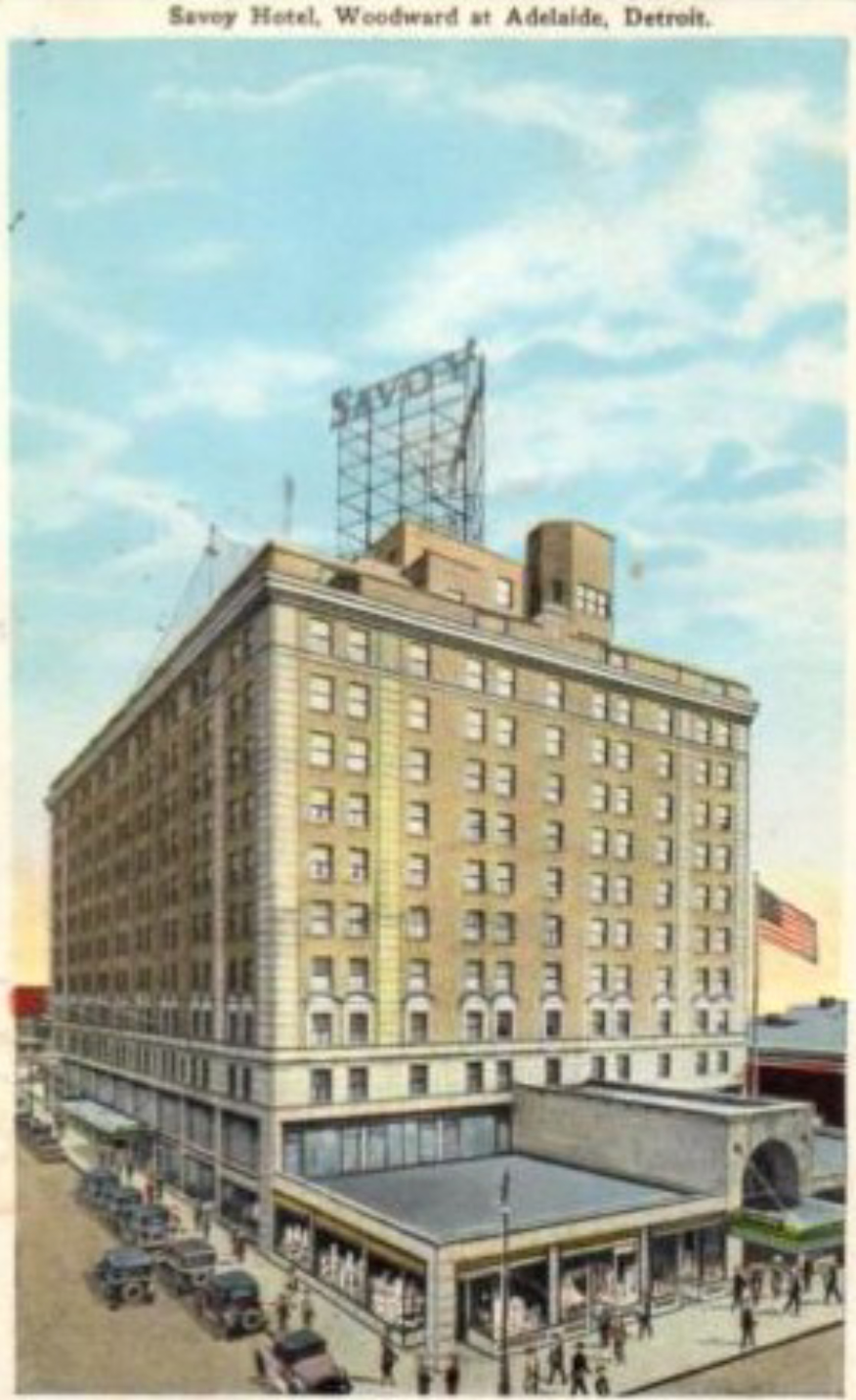
The LaSalle Hotel (formerly Savoy), where Buckley was killed

On the night of the successful recall, Buckley was approached by three men and shot eleven times in the lobby of the LaSalle Hotel in Detroit, where WMBC's studios were located.

Following a funeral mass at St. Gregory's Catholic Church, Buckley was buried at Detroit's Mount Olivet Cemetery. The funeral had 150,000 attendees.

After his murder, Police Commissioner Wilcox alleged that Buckley was a known extortionist and racketeer who had likely been killed because of his underworld connections. In his attempt to tarnish Buckley's reputation, Wilcox produced an affidavit stating that the slain radio commentator had been paid $4,000 in "protection money" by a bootlegger. The affidavit was soon dismissed as having been coerced. Buckley's brother Paul, a former assistant prosecutor, claimed that the murder was orchestrated as revenge for the campaign against the mayor.

In response, Michigan Gov. Fred W. Green directed the state police to investigate the murder separately from the Detroit Police Department. The investigation was taken to a grand jury by prosecutor (and future Governor) Harry Kelly.

=== Trial ===
Historical documents provide several different iterations of the events that occurred that night, testimonies given, as well as suspects and their fates. As a result of the murder and inconclusive initial investigation, a Grand Jury of 23 people was constructed to investigate the murder of Buckley. Harry Toy served as prosecutor, with Harry Kelly second in command. Anthony Maiullo, Allen W. Kent, Nicholas Salowich, and Leroy W. Payne provided defense.

The first person to be questioned was Mrs. Lucille Love, whose car blocked the street after the shots were fired. She claimed to have heard the shots, and exited the car and fled across the street in fright. The jury made note of the fact that she was being held as a witness for some time, making $25 a week, and that she was the daughter of a policeman.

Other sources invoke the testimony of Gus Reno, who owned a taxi stand at the La Salle hotel. He identified Angelo Livecchi and claimed he exited the hotel and gave other men the signal to enter just seconds before gunshots were heard. Livecchi was charged with first degree murder. Other suspects included Thomas Licavoli, Ted Pizzino, Mike Morgany, and Frank Cammarata. Thomas Licavoli was buried just 100 feet away from Buckley.

Testimonies from Robert Jackson, the hotel's night porter, and Fred Tara, a shady police informant, identified Pizzino, Bommarito, and Livecchi as the three men who killed Buckley.

At one point, Tara refused cross examination and fought with news reporters, claiming that a photo of him would mean his death. Tara was held in contempt, and his testimony was stricken from the record. Upon resuming his testification later in the trial, the judge reinstated his earlier testimony.

Other witness testimonies contradicted the accounts of Jackson and Tara- an auto salesman who had been in the lobby and claimed to have seen the killers testified that none of the three that were identified by Jackson and Tara were there. An electrician who was across the street testified that he had seen the murderers enter the building, and that none of the men on trial were the men he saw. William Adams, a bellboy who was also in the lobby, was not able to identify any of the men. W.S. Martin, a WMBC radio engineer who had disappeared after the murder, resurfaced a week before the trial and stated that he was willing to testify and that he would recognize the killers, but that they were not Pizzino, Bommarito, and Livecchi.

Although henchmen belonging to Detroit mobster James "Blackie" Licavoli's gang were arrested, no convictions were secured for the killing.

== See also ==
- Detroit Partnership
- List of journalists killed in the United States
- List of homicides in Michigan
- Censorship in the United States
