= List of public art in Detroit =

This is a list of public art in Detroit.

This list applies only to works of public art accessible in an outdoor public space. For example, this does not include artwork visible inside a museum.

== Selected artworks ==
Image	Title / subject	Location and coordinates	Date	Artist / designer	Type	Material	Dimensions	Designation	Owner / administrator	Notes
	Antoine de la Mothe Cadillac	Philip A. Hart Plaza 42°19′43″N 83°2′37″W	2001	William Kieffer and Ann Feely	sculpture	bronze			City of Detroit	
	Atom Gazelle	Belle Isle Park 42°21′2″N 82°58′10″W	1991	Richard Bennett	sculpture	stainless steel			City of Detroit	
	Balancing Act	One Campus Martius 42°20′0″N 83°2′47″W	2016	HOW and NOSM	mural		184 x 60 feet (56.1 x 18.2 m)		Library Street Collective	
	Bagley Memorial Fountain	Cadillac Square 42°19′53″N 83°2′42″W	May 30, 1887 (relocated July 3, 1926)	Henry Hobson Richardson	fountain	white Worcester granite		Michigan State Historic Site	City of Detroit	
	Curved Form with Rectangle and Space	Scarab Club 42°21′34″N 83°3′47″W	2000	Lois Teicher	sculpture	stainless steel			University Cultural Center Association	
	Detroit Chimera Graffiti Mural	Russell Industrial Center, Building Number 2 42°22′39.71″N 83°3′39.89″W	between 2010 and 2012	Kobie Solomon	mural		8,750 square feet (813 square meters)		Russell Industrial Center	
	Le fleuve la garonne	Detroit Institute of Arts 42°21′32″N 83°3′54″W	early 20th century	after Antoine Coysevox	sculpture	bronze	53 x 99 1/4 x 44 3/4 inches (134.6 x 252.1 x 113.7 cm)		Detroit Institute of Arts	
	Johann Friedrich Schiller	Belle Isle Park 42°20′29″N 82°58′48″W	designed 1906, dedicated May 11, 1908	Herman Matzen	sculpture	stainless steel	approx. 6 x 4 x 8 feet (1.8 x 1.2 x 2.4 m )		City of Detroit	
	Gateway to Freedom International Memorial to the Underground Railroad	Philip A. Hart Plaza 42°19′35″N 83°2′38″W	dedicated October 20, 2001	Edward Dwight	sculpture				City of Detroit	
	General Alexander Macomb	Washington Boulevard at Michigan Avenue 42°19′55″N 83°3′3″W	dedicated September 11, 1908	Adolph Alexander Weinman	sculpture	bronze	9 feet x 44 inches x 42 inches (2.7 m x 1.1 m x 1 m)		City of Detroit	
	Gracehoper	Detroit Institute of Arts 42°21′36″N 83°3′55″W	1961	Tony Smith	sculpture	steel and paint	23 × 22 × 46 feet (7 m 1 cm × 6 m 70.6 cm × 14 m 2.1 cm)		Detroit Institute of Arts	
	Hamtramck Disneyland	Hamtramck 42°24′26.2″N 83°3′31″W	created 1992, finished 1999	Dmytro Szylak	installation				Hatch Art	
	Hazen Stuart Pingree	southwest of Woodward Avenue and East Adams Avenue 42°20′12″N 83°3′3″W	1903, dedicated May 30, 1904	Rudolf Schwartz	bronze	stainless steel	10 1/2 x 6 x 6 feet (3.2 x 1.8 x 1.8 m)		City of Detroit	
	Heidelberg Project	McDougall-Hunt neighborhood, east Detroit 42°21′31.23″N 83°1′16.88″W	created 1986, ongoing	Tyree Guyton	installation				Tyree Guyton	
	Horace E. Dodge and Son Memorial Fountain	Philip A. Hart Plaza 42°19′37″N 83°2′38″W	1972-1979, dedicated October 14, 1981	Isamu Noguchi	fountain	stainless steel and black granite	30 feet (9.1 m)		City of Detroit	
	James Scott Memorial Fountain	Belle Isle Park 42°20′6.22″N 82°59′57.52″W	1923, dedicated May 31, 1925	Cass Gilbert and Herbert Adams	fountain	marble, cement, bronze	18 feet x 75 feet (5.5 m x 22.9 m)		City of Detroit	
	Jeune fille et sa suite (Young Woman and Her Suitors)	Detroit Institute of Arts 42°21′32″N 83°3′47″W	1970	Alexander Calder	sculpture	painted steel	35 feet × 27 feet 6 inches × 19 feet (10 m 66.8 cm × 8 m 38.2 cm × 5 m 79.1 cm)		Detroit Institute of Arts	
	Monica	500 Woodward	2016	Swoon	mural		17 feet		Library Street Collective	
	Monument to Joe Louis	Philip A. Hart Plaza 42°19′43.3″N 83°2′40.36″W	dedicated October 16, 1986	Robert Graham	sculpture	bronze	25 feet 6 inches × 24 feet 6 inches (7 m 77.2 cm × 7 m 46.8 cm)		Detroit Institute of Arts	
	Nymph and Eros	Detroit Institute of Arts 42°21′33″N 83°3′55″W	early 20th century	after Philippe Magnier	sculpture	bronze	51 x 99 x 45 inches (129.5 x 251.5 x 114.3 cm)		Detroit Institute of Arts	
	Passo di danza (Step of the Dance)	One Woodward Avenue, Jefferson Avenue entrance 42°19′43″N 83°2′43″W	1963	Giacomo Manzù	sculpture	bronze	11 feet (3.4 m)		One Woodward Avenue	
	Phoenix	Scarab Club, west facade 42°21′34″N 83°3′46″W	1976	Stephen Veresh	sculpture	copper			Scarab Club	
	Pylon	Philip A. Hart Plaza 42°19′41.4″N 83°02′39.0″W	1972-1979	Isamu Noguchi	sculpture	stainless steel	20 x 7 x 7 feet (6 x 2.1 x 2.1 m)		City of Detroit	
	Russell Alger Memorial Fountain	Grand Circus Park 42°20′12″N 83°2′59″W	1920, dedicated July 27, 1921	Daniel Chester French	fountain	bronze	7 feet 6 inches x 56 inches x 58 inches (2.3 x 1.4 x 1.5 m)		City of Detroit	
	Sentry	Charles H. Wright Museum of African American History 42°21′31″N 83°3′39″W	1996-1997	Richard Bennett	sculpture	aluminum and gold			Charles H. Wright Museum of African American History	
	The Spirit of Detroit	Coleman A. Young Municipal Center 42°19′45.47″N 83°2′40.66″W	1958	Marshall Fredericks	sculpture	bronze	312 inches (200.7 × 130.2 × 140.3 cm, 907.2 kg)		Coleman A. Young Municipal Center	
	Stevens T. Mason	Capitol Park 42°19′59″N 83°2′58″W	dedicated May 30, 1908	Adolph Alexander Weinman	sculpture	bronze	8 feet x 30 inches x 30 inches (2.4 m x 0.76 m x 0.76 m)		City of Detroit	
	The Thinker	Detroit Institute of Arts, southeast lawn 42°21′32″N 83°3′55″W	1904	Auguste Rodin	sculpture	bronze	79 × 51 1/4 × 55 1/4 inches, 2000 pounds (200.7 × 130.2 × 140.3 cm, 907.2 kg)		Detroit Institute of Arts	
	Transcending	Philip A. Hart Plaza 42°19′40″N 83°2′41″W	dedicated August 30, 2003	David Barr and Sergio de Guisti	sculpture	steel	63 feet (19.2 m)		City of Detroit	
	United We Stand	Charles H. Wright Museum of African American History, Farnsworth entrance 42°21′32″N 83°3′42″W	2016	Charles McGee	sculpture				Charles H. Wright Museum of African American History	
	Unity	28 West Grand River Avenue 42°20′2″N 83°2′58″W	2017	Charles McGee	mural		118 x 50 feet		Library Street Collective	
	untitled mural	The Belt 42°20′5″N 83°2′49″W	2016	Nina Chanel Abney	mural				Library Street Collective	
	untitled mural	25 East Grand River Avenue 42°20′4″N 83°2′53″W	2015	Aryz	mural				Library Street Collective	
	untitled mural	One Campus Martius 42°20′0″N 83°2′48″W	2015	Shepard Fairey	mural		184 feet (56.1 m)		Library Street Collective	
	untitled mural	Madison Building 42°20′9″N 83°2′57″W	2014	HENSE	mural		10,000 square feet (929 square meters)		Library Street Collective	
	untitled mural	14635 East Jefferson 42°22′27″N 82°56′30″W	2016	Swoon and Baba Wayne	mural				Library Street Collective	
	Wayfinding: An Art Installation and Skate Park	Monroe Blocks 100 Monroe Avenue 42°19′58″N 83°2′42″W	from August 2017 through January 2018	Ryan McGinness and Tony Hawk	installation		4600 square feet (1402.1 square meters)		Library Street Collective and Cranbrook Art Museum	
	Weather Permitting	35 East Grand River Avenue 42°20′4″N 83°2′52″W	2017	Willie Wayne Smith	mural				Library Street Collective	
	William Cotter Maybury	east of Woodward Avenue and East Adams Avenue 42°20′13″N 83°3′2″W	dedicated November 24, 1912	Adolph Alexander Weinman	sculpture	bronze	5 x 3 x 4 feet (1.5 x .91 x 1.2 m)		City of Detroit	
