= Statue of Stevens T. Mason =

Sculpture in Detroit by Albert Weinert

Stevens T. Mason
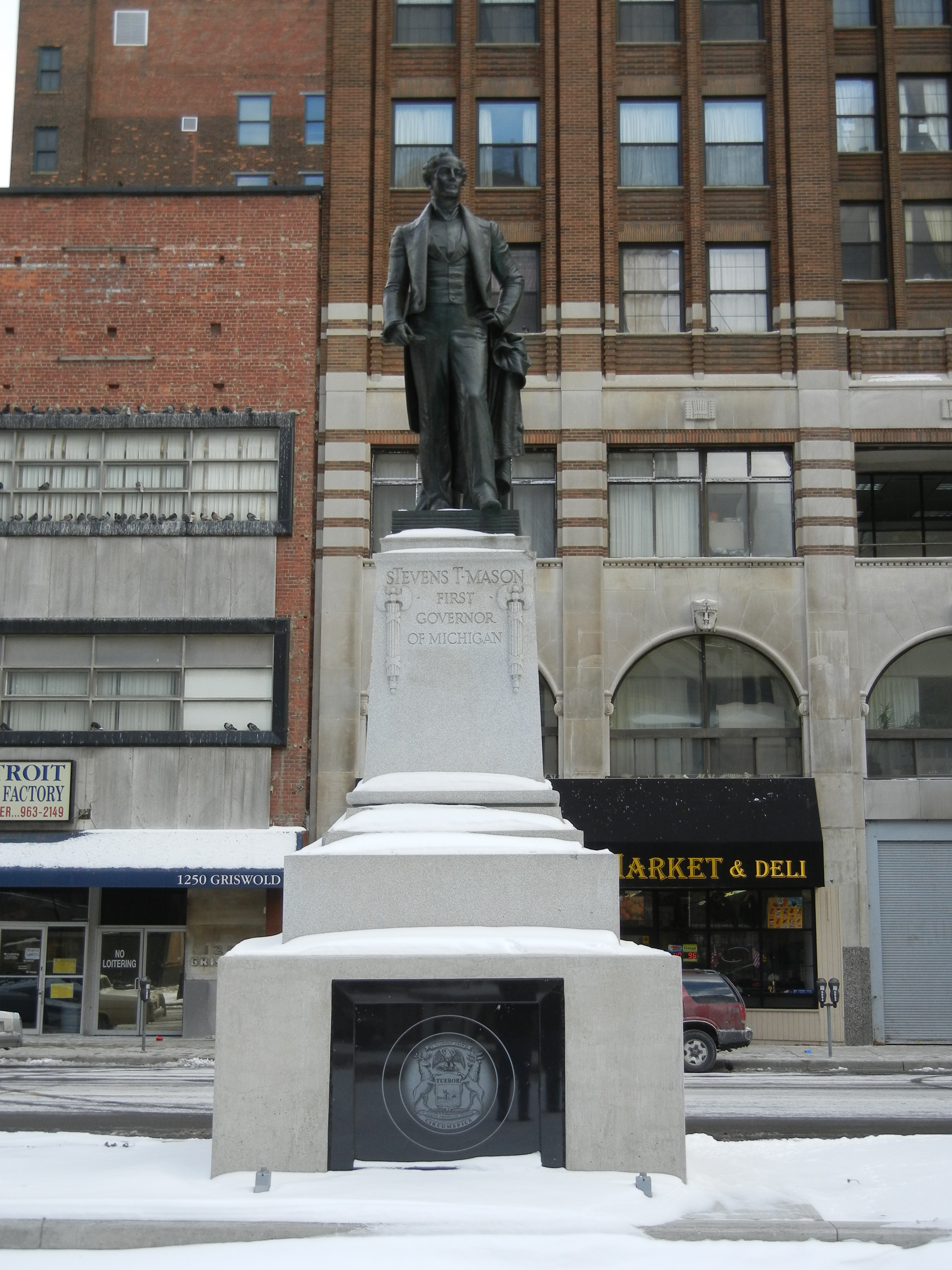
- The statue in 2011
- Interactive map of Stevens T. Mason
- Location: Capitol Park, Detroit, Michigan, United States
- Coordinates: 42°19′59″N 83°2′58″W
- Designer: Albert Weinert (sculptor); H. Van Buren Magonigle (architect)
- Fabricator: Roman Bronze Works (statue); Lloyd Bros. (pedestal)
- Type: Statue
- Material: Bronze; Barre granite
- Length: 60 inches (1.5 m)
- Width: 60 inches (1.5 m)
- Height: 16 feet (4.9 m)
- Beginning date: 1907
- Completion date: 1908
- Dedicated date: May 30, 1908
- Dedicated to: Stevens T. Mason

Stevens T. Mason, also known as the Stevens T. Mason Monument, is a monumental statue in Detroit, Michigan, United States. The monument was designed by sculptor Albert Weinert and architect H. Van Buren Magonigle in honor of Stevens T. Mason, who had served as the first governor of Michigan in the mid-1800s and is notable for being the youngest person to ever serve as the governor of a U.S. state. Mason's remains are interred underneath the monument, which is located in Capitol Park, the site of the former state capitol building. The monument was dedicated on Memorial Day 1908.

== History ==
=== Background ===
Stevens T. Mason was an American politician who served as the first governor of Michigan in the early 1800s. In 1831, at the age of 19, U.S. President Andrew Jackson appointed him secretary of the Michigan Territory, and three years later, he became the acting governor of the territory. In these positions, Mason pushed for statehood and, upon Michigan's admittance to the union in 1837, he became the state's first governor. Taking office at the age of 24, he is still the youngest person to ever hold a governorship in the United States, and as a result he is sometimes referred to as the "Boy Governor". Mason would serve as governor until 1839. Following his time in office, he moved to New York City to practice law, where he died of pneumonia in 1843. Although initially buried in a cemetery in the city, his remains were relocated to Detroit in 1905. He was buried in Capitol Park, which had been the location of the state capitol building before the capital was moved to Lansing. The reburial ceremony was attended by about 2,000 spectators.

=== Creation ===
Around the time of Mason's reburial, efforts were underway for the creation of a monument in Detroit in his honor. In 1906, the U.S. Congress granted condemned cannons to the government of Michigan to use in the creation of a statue of Mason. These cannons had been procured by U.S. Senator and former Secretary of War Russell A. Alger, a Detroit native, and were from Fort Michilimackinac in Michigan. The following year, the Michigan Legislature passed a number of joint resolutions regarding this statue, allocating $10,000 for the project and calling on the governor to create a three-person commission to oversee the project. Additionally, the legislation specified that the statue would be located at the place of Mason's interment, in Capitol Park. Reporting on the legislation in April 1907, the magazine Granite, Marble and Bronze stated that the governor had organized a commission consisting of politicians Lawton T. Hemans, Arthur L. Holmes, and Daniel McCoy. These three had previously acted as the commission responsible for Mason's reburial in Detroit. The commission held a contest to solicit design proposals and that of New York City-based sculptor Albert Weinert was ultimately selected. Additionally, the magazine stated that the statue would take about a year to complete. Architect H. Van Buren Magonigle, also of New York City, was selected as the architect for the project, overseeing the design of the pedestal and surrounding stonework. Casting for the statue was done by the Roman Bronze Works. In May 1908, The Monumental News reported that the pedestal was being erected by the Lloyd Bros. of Toledo, Ohio and that the monument was expected to be dedicated in June of that year.

=== Dedication ===
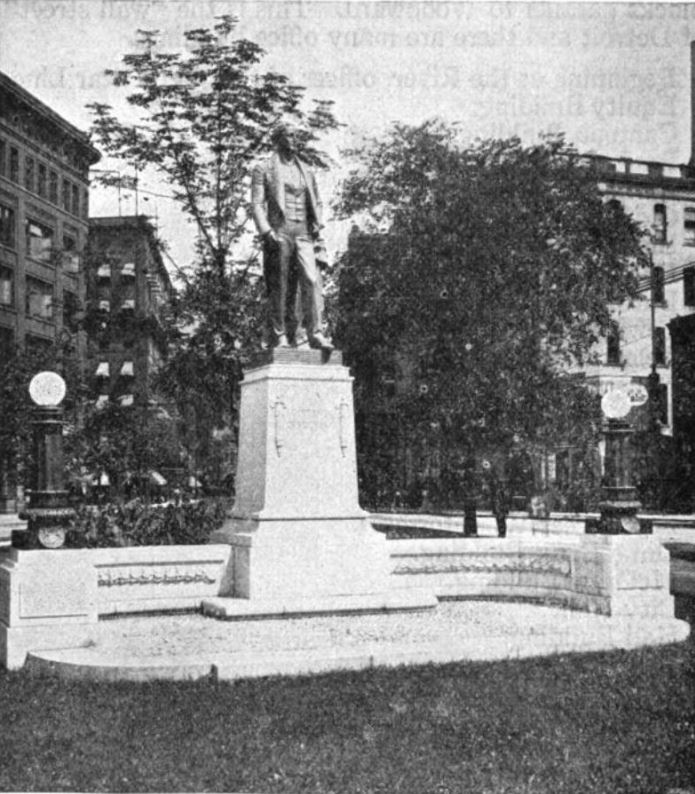
The monument with original platform and exedra, c. 1916

The monument was dedicated on May 30, 1908, Memorial Day, in a ceremony attended by several thousand spectators. Thomas W. Palmer presided over the ceremony, and the statue was unveiled by Mason's 93-year-old sister Emily V. Mason. (Note: One source states that Emily was 91 years old at the time of the dedication. However, another source states that she was 91 years old at the time of Mason's reinterment in Capitol Park in 1905.) Following this, an address was delivered by the Reverend Walter Elliott, which was followed by remarks given by Hemans, Detroit Mayor William Barlum Thompson, and Michigan Governor Fred M. Warner. Closing remarks were given by James Burrill Angell, the president of the University of Michigan, who praised Mason for his early support of the university. In honor of Emily (who was a native of Virginia), the band present at the ceremony played "Dixie" at the dedication's conclusion. In June 1908, The Monumental News reported that leftover bronze not used in the casting of the statue would be used to make statuette facsimiles of the statue.

=== Later history ===
In 1955, the park underwent a renovation that saw Mason's casket unearthed, with his remains kept in temporary storage in a morgue. Despite some calls to relocate the remains to the state capital of Lansing, they were re-interred under the statue following the renovations. At some point during the 1900s, a semicircular platform and balustrade that had once formed part of the monument were removed, leaving only the pedestal and statue. In 1993, the statue was surveyed as part of the Save Outdoor Sculpture! project.

In June 2010, the city began a refurbishing project for Capitol Park, with plans to relocate the monument and Mason's remains from near a traffic intersection to a more centralized part of the park. As part of the project, the statue was temporarily removed for restoration work. During the relocation process, it was discovered that Mason had been buried a short distance from the monument instead of directly under the pedestal as was previously thought. Mason was reinterred in October 2010. On October 27, 2011, Mason's 200th birthday, the Michigan Historical Commission dedicated a historical marker near the monument. In September 2017, the Downtown Detroit Partnership released plans created in conjunction with a Toronto-based architectural firm for a redevelopment of Capitol Park. As part of the project, the statue's pedestal would be removed, and the statue would be placed at ground-level.

== Design ==
The monument consists of a bronze statue of Masons standing atop a pedestal made of Barre granite. The statue stands approximately 8 feet (2.4 m) tall, with a square base of side measurements of 30 inches (0.76 m). Mason is dressed in clothing from the 1830s and holds a book in his right hand, while his left hand is placed on his hip. A 1908 review in The Monumental News states that the statue is "a graceful, well-modeled portrait of the governor as he appeared in his younger days". The base of the statue is inscribed with foundry marks (Roman Bronze Works, N.Y.). The pedestal also stands approximately 8 feet (2.4 m) tall and has side measurements of 60 inches (1.5 m). On the front of the pedestal are two fasces and the inscription "STEVENS T. MASON/FIRST/GOVERNOR/OF MICHIGAN". The back of the pedestal bears the following inscription: "THE TRIBUTE OF/MICHIGAN/TO THE MEMORY OF HER/FIRST GOVERNOR/WHOSE ASHES LIE BENEATH/CALLED TO THE DUTIES OF/MANHOOD WHILE YET A BOY/HE SO ACQUITTED HIMSELF/AS TO STAMP HIS NAME/INDELIBLY ON THE HISTORY/OF THE/COMMONWEALTH".

=== Original design ===
When originally dedicated, the monument stood on a semicircular platform surrounded by an exedra. On either side of the monument were two marble endpieces that served as both benches and decorative spacers, and they were topped by bronze lampposts. The overall look of this section was similar to other monuments in Detroit, including the statue of Alexander Macomb and a statue of James J. Brady on Belle Isle. However, these sections of the monument were removed at some point during the 1900s.

== See also ==
- List of public art in Detroit

== Sources ==
- "Coffin believed to hold Stevens T. Mason, Michigan's 1st governor, found". MLive.com. Associated Press. January 21, 2019a [June 29, 2010]. Archived from the original on January 8, 2022.
- "Michigan's 'boy governor' turns 200: Detroit dedication to honor Stevens T. Mason". MLive.com. Associated Press. January 21, 2019b [October 27, 2011]. Archived from the original on January 8, 2022.
- Haddad, Ken (August 5, 2021). "A look at history behind Detroit statues, monuments". WDIV News. Archived from the original on December 30, 2021.
- Hemans, Lawton T. (1920). Life and Times of Stevens Thomson Mason: The Boy Governor of Michigan. Lansing: Michigan Historical Commission.
- Hunt, A. M., ed. (April 1, 1907). "Proposed Monuments & Monumental News". Granite, Marble and Bronze. XVII (4). Boston: A. M. Hunt & Co.: 34–37.
- Keep, Helen E.; Burton, M. Agnes (1916). Guide to Detroit. Distributed by The Detroit News Company. Detroit: Conover Press.
- "Joint Resolutions, 1907". Public Acts of the Legislature of the State of Michigan Passed at the Regular Session of 1907. Michigan Legislature. Lansing: Wynkoop Hallenbeck Crawford Co. 1907. pp. 500–525.
- "Among the Retail Dealers". The Monumental News. XX (5). Chicago: 384–390. May 1908a.
- "Proposed Monuments". The Monumental News. XX (6). Chicago: 477. June 1908b.
- "The Season's Unveilings". The Monumental News. XX (7). Chicago: 499–503, 511. July 1908c.
- "To Michigan's First Governor". The Monumental News. XX (8). Chicago: 573. August 1908d.
- "Detroit Monument to Hero of War of 1812". The Monumental News. XX (11). Chicago: 790. November 1908f.
- Nawrocki, Dennis Alan (1999). Art in Detroit Public Places. Photographs by David Clements (Revised ed.). Detroit: Wayne State University Press. ISBN 978-0-8143-2702-9.
- Runyan, Robin (September 13, 2017) [September 12, 2017]. "New Capitol Park design includes tree canopy, nod to history [updated]". Curbed Detroit. Archived from the original on October 5, 2020.
- Runyan, Robin; Mondry, Aaron (October 9, 2019) [October 13, 2017]. "13 haunted places in Detroit". Curbed Detroit. With contributions from Nicole Lapointe. Archived from the original on August 1, 2021.
- Sagendorph, Kent (1947). Stevens Thomson Mason: Misunderstood Patriot. New York City: E. P. Dutton & Company.
- "Stevens T. Mason, (sculpture)". Smithsonian Institution Research Information System. Archived from the original on January 8, 2022.
- "Granting Condemned Cannon for a Statue to Governor Stevens T. Mason, of Michigan". United States Congressional Serial Set. 59th United States Congress, 1st Session (Report No. 4418). Government Printing Office: 1. May 24, 1906.
- Weddon, Willah (1994a). First Ladies of Michigan (Revised, 2nd ed.). Lansing: NOG Press. ISBN 978-0-9638376-0-8.
- Weddon, Willah (1994b). Michigan Governors: Their Life Stories (1st ed.). Lansing: NOG Press. ISBN 978-0-9638376-2-2.
