= Statue of Alexander Macomb =

Statue in Detroit, Michigan

General Alexander Macomb
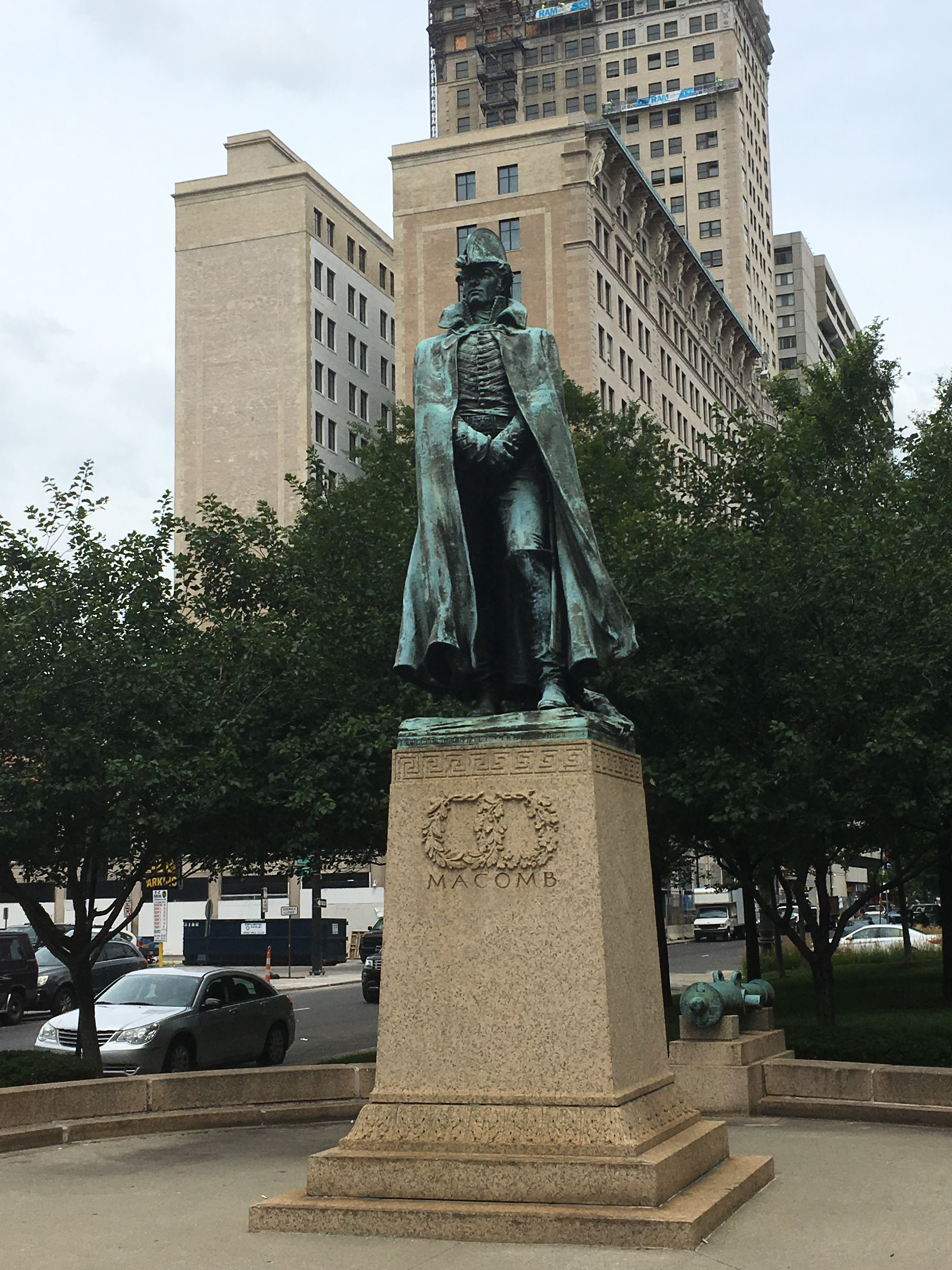
- The statue in 2018
- Location: Washington Boulevard, Detroit, Michigan, United States
- Coordinates: 42°19′55″N 83°3′3.5″W
- Designer: Adolph Alexander Weinman (sculptor)
- Builder: Henry-Bonnard Bronze Company (statue); Maine & New Hampshire Granite Co. (pedestal)
- Type: Statue
- Material: Bronze; Granite
- Length: 6 feet 5 inches (1.96 m)
- Width: 6 feet 5 inches (1.96 m)
- Height: 16 feet (4.9 m)
- Beginning date: 1906
- Completion date: 1908
- Dedicated date: September 11, 1908
- Dedicated to: Alexander Macomb

General Alexander Macomb is a monumental statue in Detroit, Michigan, United States. It was designed by sculptor Adolph Alexander Weinman and was dedicated in 1908 in honor of Alexander Macomb, a Detroit native who had served as the Commanding General of the United States Army for several years in the early 1800s. The monument, which consists of the bronze statue of Macomb standing atop a granite pedestal on a circular concrete platform, was dedicated on September 11, on the anniversary of the Battle of Plattsburgh, a War of 1812 battle that Macomb had participated in. Since the 2010s, the statue has come under criticism due to Macomb's connections to slavery and the mistreatment of Native Americans, with several news sources publishing opinion pieces calling for the statue's removal. During the George Floyd protests in 2020, the monument was vandalized several times.

== History ==
=== Background ===
Alexander Macomb was a Detroit native who was born into a wealthy family in 1782. As a young adult, he pursued a military career and served as a general officer in the United States Army during the War of 1812. For his participation in the Battle of Plattsburgh in 1814, he was awarded a Congressional Gold Medal and promoted to the rank of major general. Between 1828 and 1841, he served as the Commanding General of the United States Army, a position he would hold until his death in Washington, D.C. that same year. (Note: One source states that he was promoted to "General-in-chief" in 1835, while other sources gives his position as "Commander-in-Chief".) In the years following his death, his legacy was largely forgotten, with a 1901 article in The American Architect and Building News stating that the only monument in his honor was the one over his grave in the Congressional Cemetery.

=== Creation and dedication ===
In the early 1900s, erecting a monumental statue in honor of Macomb became a primary goal of the Michigan chapter of the National Society of United States Daughters of 1812, a civic group consisting of descendants of veterans from the War of 1812. In March 1901, several sources reported that the Michigan chapter had approved of a design for a statue honoring Macomb from sculptor Louis Amateis. Leslie's Weekly reported that Amateis had won a competition for the design, which would have depicted Macomb standing on a rampart, delivering directions to other soldiers. Additional bas reliefs would have depicted scenes from the Battle of Plattsburgh. The total cost for the project would have been approximately $15,000. Despite the announcement, Amateis's design for the monument would not come to fruition. However, the chapter continued their efforts and in 1902, thanks to assistance from Michigan's U.S. Senators Julius C. Burrows and James McMillan, 7,000 pounds (3,200 kg) of condemned cannons were appropriated from the United States Senate Committee on Military Affairs to provide the material for the statue's construction.

By 1906, the magazine The Search-Light reported that the Michigan chapter was still moving forward with plans to erect a monument to Macomb, utilizing the condemned cannons acquired from the U.S. Congress. The cost for the monument was projected to be at most $10,000, and the government of Michigan and government of Detroit had appropriated $5,000 and $2,000, respectively, for the project. Additionally, the city provided a location for the monument: the southern end of a park along Washington Boulevard, facing Michigan Avenue. That same year, sculptor Adolph Alexander Weinman won a competition to design the statue. Weinman, who was 36 years old at the time, had worked under several other notable sculptors of the era, including Daniel Chester French, Philip Martiny, Charles Henry Niehaus, Augustus Saint-Gaudens, and Olin Levi Warner. The casting of the statue was performed by the Henry-Bonnard Bronze Company of New York City. Meanwhile, the stonework for the rest of the monument was performed by the Maine & New Hampshire Granite Co. of Portland, Maine. In total, the monument cost $12,000, with the Michigan chapter providing the remaining $5,000 for the project.

The statue was dedicated on September 11, 1908, on the anniversary of the Battle of Plattsburgh. The main speech at the ceremony was given by U.S. Representative Edwin Denby, while Beatrice Larned Whitney, the president of the Michigan chapter of the Daughters of 1812, also gave a speech. The statue was accepted on behalf of the city by Detroit Mayor William Barlum Thompson and was unveiled by a niece of Macomb's.

=== Later history ===
Due to the positive reception of the statue, Weinman was later commissioned to design a second public statue in the city, one honoring Detroit Mayor William C. Maybury that was dedicated in 1912. In 1993, the Macomb monument was catalogued as part of the Save Outdoor Sculpture! project.

==== Vandalism and calls for removal ====
Since the 2010s, there have been some calls to remove the statue due to Macomb's connections to slavery in the United States and the genocide of Native Americans. In a 2017 op-ed in The New York Times, historian Tiya Miles stated that Alexander Macomb (his father) and William Macomb (his uncle) had illegally purchased Grosse Ile from the Potawatomi people and were the largest slave-owners in Detroit in the late 1700s. However, historians are unsure if Macomb himself had ever owned slaves. On June 14, 2020, during a march as part of the George Floyd protests in Michigan, a protestor placed a bag over Macomb's head and wrapped rope around the statue's neck. In an interview with The Detroit News several days later on June 16, Wayne State University professor David Goldberg opined that the statue could be replaced with one of an abolitionist, such as William Lambert. On September 5, 2020, the monument was vandalized again, with the words "Slave Owner Land Thief" spray-painted in red paint on the pedestal. In addition, someone had placed a bag over Macomb's head. According to the Detroit Police Department, the city's department of public works would remove the paint while they investigated the incident. Around the same time, Kyle Alexander de Beausset, a descendant of Macomb, wrote an article for the Detroit Free Press where he argued that the statue should be removed, saying, "What that statue does is relegate the slavery and genocide associated with the Macombs to historical footnotes. Slavery and genocide aren't footnotes—they're a fundamental part of how we all got to where we're at today".

== Design ==
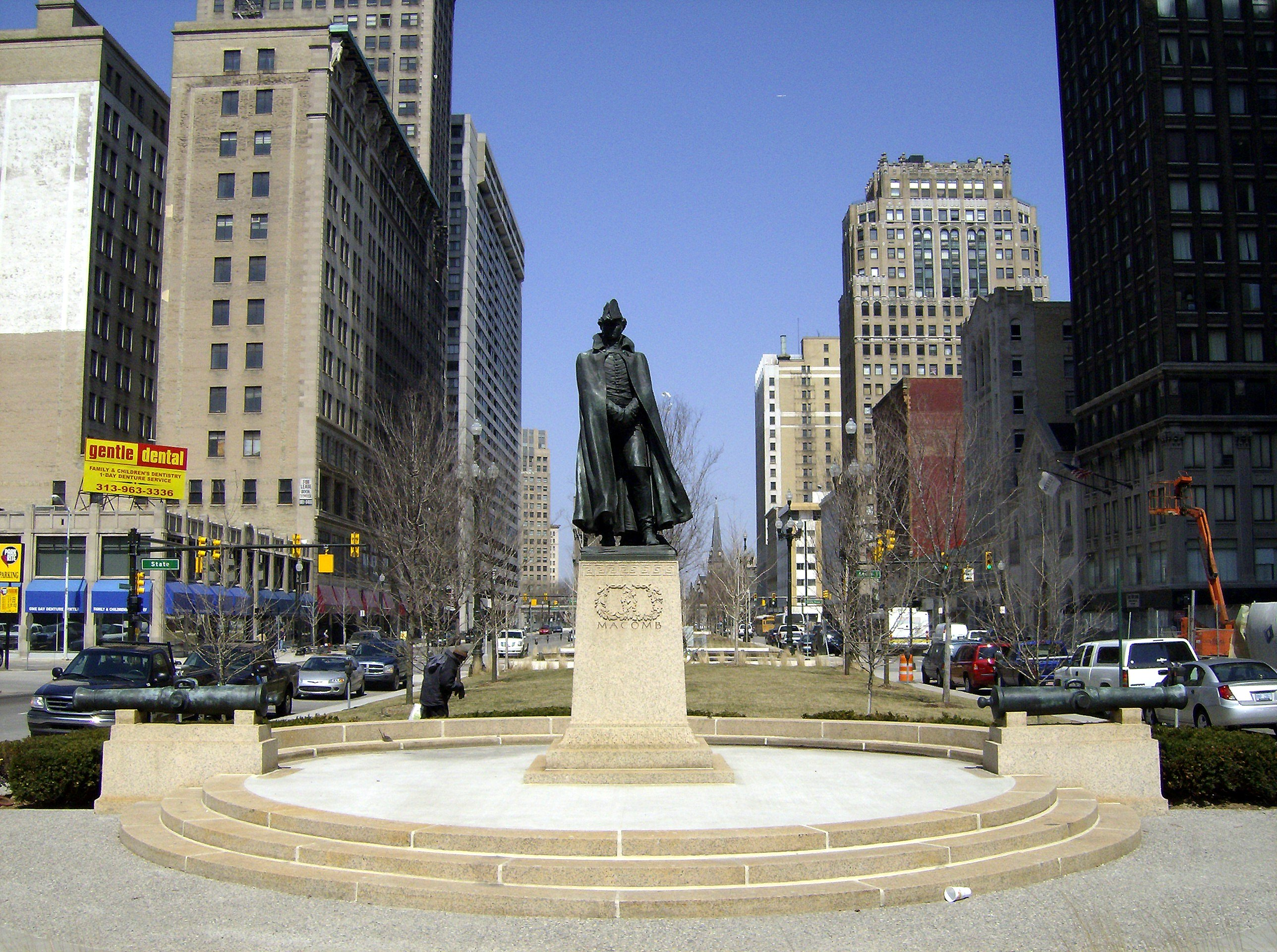
Statue and surrounding platform, 2008

The monument consists of a bronze statue of Macomb atop a granite pedestal in the center of a circular platform. The platform is made of a concrete aggregate. At the front of the monument, the platform has three semi-circular descending steps made of granite, while the back half of the platform is surrounded by a small parapet. At the northern, eastern, and western edges of this parapet are small granite pedestals, upon which are placed bronze cannons from the War of 1812. The diameter of this platform is approximately 30 feet (9.1 m). It resembles the original configuration of the base for the statue of Stevens T. Mason in Detroit.

The pedestal for the statue is made of pink New Hampshire granite and measures 6 feet 5 inches (1.96 m) on either side and 7 feet (2.1 m) tall. On the front face of the pedestal is a relief showing a wreath of oak leaves intertwined with a laurel wreath. Below this, the name "MACOMB" is engraved. On the back face, the following is engraved: "TO MAJOR GENERAL/ALEXANDER MACOMB/COMMANDING THE/ARMY OF THE UNITED/STATES HERO OF THE/BATTLE OF PLATTSBURG/THIS MONUMENT IS/ERECTED IN THE CITY/OF HIS BIRTH BY THE/MICHIGAN SOCIETY/OF THE UNITED STATES/DAUGHTERS OF 1812/SEPTEMBER 11 1908".

The statue depicts Macomb standing slightly off-center, dressed in his military uniform from the War of 1812. It is approximately 9 feet (2.7 m) tall and has a base with side measurements of 44 inches (1.1 m) and 42 inches (1.1 m). His outerwear, including a hat and cape, was designed based on surviving photographic plates of Macomb. Macomb is depicted with his hands clasped in front of him, with the wind ruffling his cape. The statue has a green finish, and small markings from the sculptor (" A.A.WEINMAN.FECIT") and foundry ("CAST BY/THE HENRY-BONNARD BRONZE CO./MT.VERNON N. Y. 1908.") are incised on the base of the statue.

=== Analysis ===
The monument was positively received upon its unveiling. A 1919 article in Michigan History Magazine referred to it as "the most artistic sculpture in the city", which "should be cherished and preserved under all circumstances". A 1909 review of the monument in The International Studio was overwhelmingly positive, with the reviewer stating, "[t]he monument, without doubt, places its author in the front rank of younger American sculptors". In particular, they highlighted the lifelike depiction of Macomb and the successful execution of the military uniform. Art historian Philip Attwood, writing in The Grove Encyclopedia of American Art, points to the statue as an example of Weinman's work in "the French tradition of naturalistic, Romantic bronzes".

== See also ==
- List of public art in Detroit

== Sources ==
- "Notes and Clippings". The American Architect and Building News. LXXI (1314): 72. March 2, 1901.
- "Macomb Monument, Detroit, Mich". Architects' and Builders' Magazine. XLI (4): 146, 149. January 1909.
- Attwood, Philip (2011). "Weinman, Adolph Alexander". In Marter, Joan (ed.). The Grove Encyclopedia of American Art. Oxford: Oxford University Press. pp. 175–176. ISBN 978-0-19-533579-8.
- Collins, Gilbert (2006). Guidebook to the Historic Sites of the War of 1812 (Second ed.). Toronto: Dundurn Press. ISBN 978-1-55002-914-7.
- Czachor, Emily (September 6, 2020). ""Slave owner" was spray-painted on an Alexander Macomb monument in Detroit's historic district". Newsweek. Archived from the original on November 11, 2021.
- Dado, Natasha (September 6, 2020). "Detroit statue vandalized amid ongoing racial unrest in US cities". WDIV-TV. Archived from the original on November 12, 2021.
- de Beausset, Kyle Alexander (June 19, 2020). "I'm a direct descendant of Gen. Alexander Macomb. It's time to take his statue down. | Opinion". Detroit Free Press. Archived from the original on November 11, 2022.
- Dyar, Clara E. (December 1909). "Adolph A. Weinman's Monument to Major-General Alexander Macomb". The International Studio. XXXIX (154). John Lane Company: XLIV–XLV.
- Haddad, Ken (August 5, 2021). "A look at history behind Detroit statues, monuments". WDIV-TV. Archived from the original on December 30, 2021.
- Keep, Helen E.; Burton, M. Agnes (1916). Guide to Detroit. Distributed by The Detroit News Company. Detroit: Conover Press.
- "People Talked About". Leslie's Weekly. XCII (2383). New York City: Judge Company: 459. May 11, 1901.
- "Proposed Monuments". The Monumental News. XIV (5). Chicago: 298. May 1902.
- "Detroit Monument to Hero of War of 1812". The Monumental News. XX (11): 790. November 1908.
- Munger, Thomas Laurence (1921). Detroit Today. Detroit Board of Commerce. Detroit.
- Nawrocki, Dennis Alan (2008). Art in Detroit Public Places. Photographs by David Clements (Third ed.). Detroit: Wayne State University Press. ISBN 978-0-8143-3378-5.
- Noble, Lucy Seward (July 1919). "National Society of the United States Daughters of 1812, State of Michigan". Michigan History Magazine. III (3). Lansing, Michigan: Michigan Historical Commission: 361–366.
- Rubin, Neal (September 18, 2020) [June 16, 2020]. "Monuments to Detroit area's past seen in new, troubling light: Slavery". The Detroit News. Archived from the original on October 19, 2021.
- "Other People Readers' Court". The Search-Light. XXXVII (11): 170. March 17, 1906.
- "General Alexander Macomb, (sculpture)". Smithsonian Institution Research Information System. Archived from the original on January 1, 2022.
- "Monumental News". Stone. XXII (3): 270–273. March 1901.
- "Statue of Maj. Gen. Alexander Macomb". United States Congressional Serial Set. 57th United States Congress, 1st Session (Report No. 871). United States Government Publishing Office: 1–2. March 27, 1902.
