= Harold Van Buren Magonigle =

American businessman

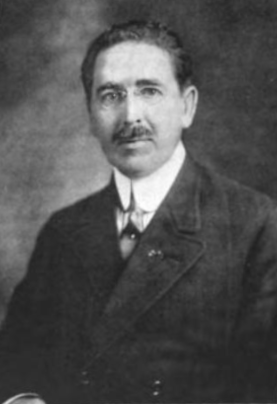
- Born: October 17, 1867; Bergen Heights, New Jersey
- Died: August 29, 1935 (aged 67); Vergennes, Vermont
- Occupations: Architect, artist, writer
- Spouse: Edith Marion Day (m. 1900)

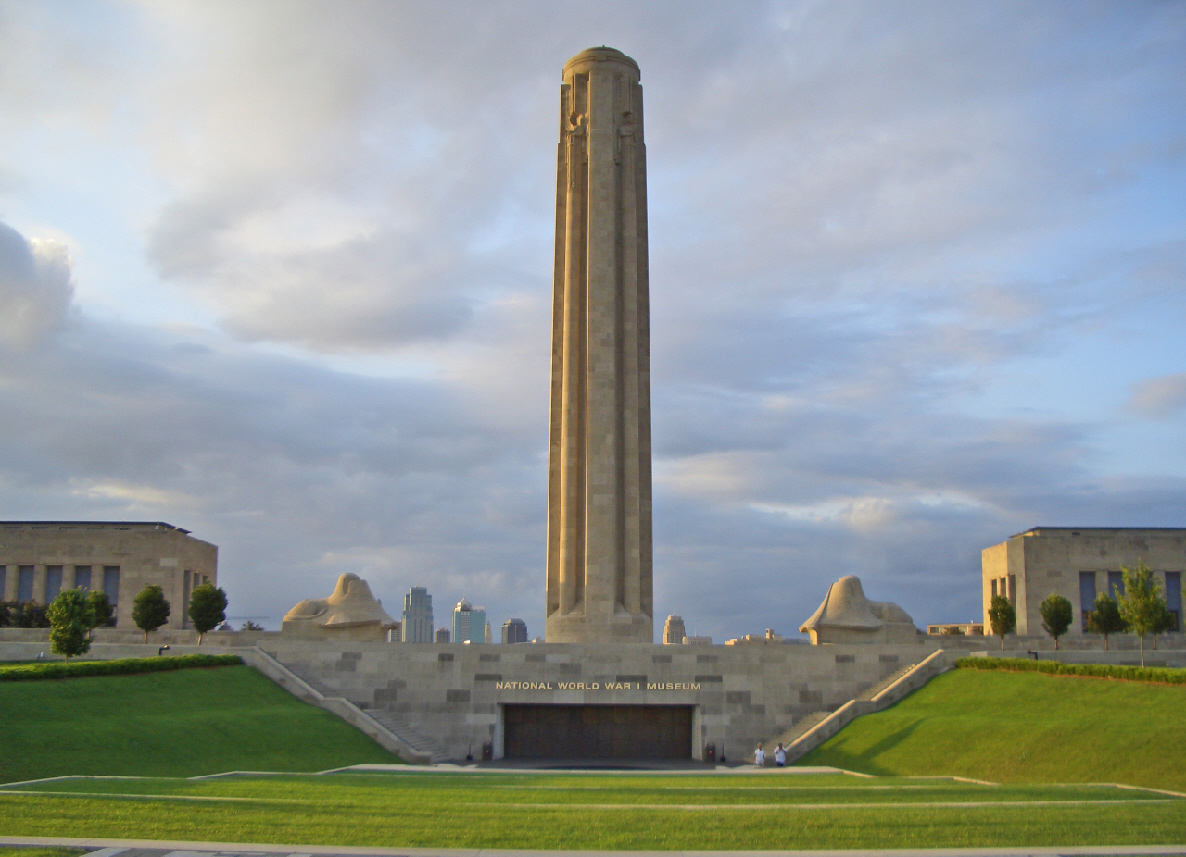
Liberty Memorial, Kansas City, Missouri

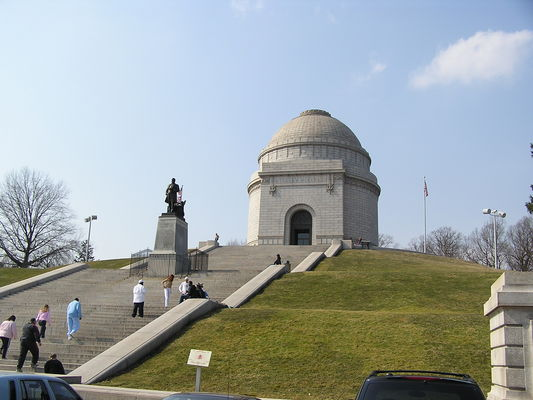
McKinley Memorial, Canton, Ohio

Harold Van Buren Magonigle (1867–1935) was an American architect, artist, and author best known for his memorials. He achieved his greatest success as a designer of monuments, but his artistic practices included sculpture, painting, writing, and graphic design.

== Biography ==
Harold Van Buren Magonigle was born in Bergen Heights, New Jersey on October 17, 1867. He worked for Calvert Vaux, Rotch & Tilden, Schickel and Ditmars and McKim Mead & White before opening his own practice in 1903. He was the designer of the McKinley Memorial Mausoleum in Canton, Ohio and the Liberty Memorial in Kansas City, Missouri both commissions won through competitions. He designed the Core Mausoleum (1910–1915) at Elmwood Cemetery.

Magonigle and sculptor Attilio Piccirilli collaborated as architect and artist on two familiar monuments in New York City: the Monument to the USS Maine in Columbus Circle, and on the Fireman's Memorial on Riverside Drive and West 100th Street. He also designed the setting for Albert Weinert's Stevens T. Mason Monument in Detroit, Michigan, and for Robert Atken's Burritt Memorial in New Britain, Connecticut.

Magonigle's wife, Edith, whom he married on April 24, 1900, was a muralist who collaborated with her husband on a number of his projects.

He died in Vergennes, Vermont on August 29, 1935.

Magonigle's papers are held by the New York Public Library and by the Drawings and Archives Department in the Avery Architectural and Fine Arts Library at Columbia University.
