= Alexander Macomb (general) =

American military officer (1782–1841)

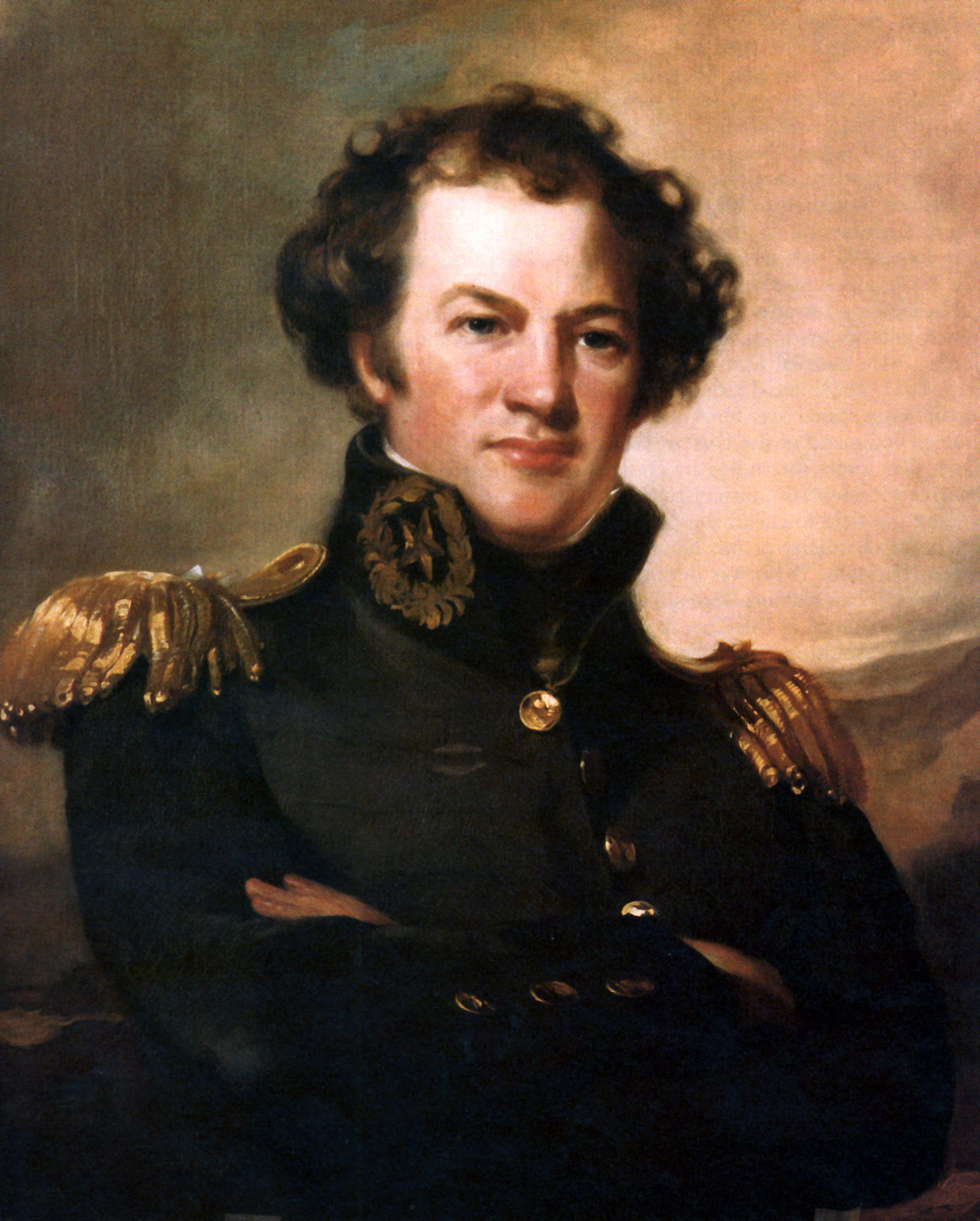
- General Macomb's official portrait, 1829

Commanding General of the U.S. Army
- In office May 29, 1828 – June 25, 1841
- President: John Quincy Adams; Andrew Jackson; Martin Van Buren; William Henry Harrison; John Tyler
- Preceded by: Jacob Brown
- Succeeded by: Winfield Scott

Personal details
- Born: April 3, 1782 Detroit, Province of Quebec, British America
- Died: June 25, 1841 (aged 59) Washington, D.C., U.S.
- Resting place: Congressional Cemetery
- Relations: William H. Macomb (son); Montgomery M. Macomb (grandnephew)
- Awards: Congressional Gold Medal

Military service
- Allegiance: United States
- Branch/service: United States Army
- Years of service: 1799–1800, 1801–1841
- Rank: Major General
- Commands: 3rd Artillery Regiment; Right Division of the Northern Army; Army Corps of Engineers; Commanding General of the United States Army
- Battles/wars: War of 1812; Battle of Fort George; Battle of Point Iroquois; Battle of Plattsburgh

Alexander Macomb (/məˈkum/; April 3, 1782 – June 25, 1841) was an American military officer who was the Commanding General of the United States Army from 1828 until his death in 1841. Macomb was the field commander at the Battle of Plattsburgh during the War of 1812 and, after the stunning victory, was lauded with praise and styled "The Hero of Plattsburgh" by some of the American press. He was promoted to Major General for his conduct, receiving both the Thanks of Congress and a Congressional Gold Medal.

== Early life ==
Born in Detroit, then part of colonial-era British America, in 1782, Macomb was the son of Alexander Macomb, a merchant and fur trader from upstate New York, and Mary Catherine Navarre, who was of ethnic French descent.

He moved with his parents to New York City, where his father gained wealth as a land speculator, particularly in the millions of acres of New York land released by the federal government for sale after the Iroquois nations had been largely forced from the state into exile in Ontario following British defeat in the American Revolutionary War. The son received a classical education at Newark Academy in New Jersey.

== Early career ==
In 1798, at the age of 16, Macomb joined a New York militia company. In January 1799, with the recommendation of Alexander Hamilton, he was commissioned a Cornet in the Regular Army during the French emergency. In March, he was promoted to second lieutenant, and he was honorably discharged in June 1800.

In February 1801, he was commissioned as a second lieutenant, 2nd Infantry, serving as secretary to a commission that treated with the Indians of the Southeast.

He was commissioned a first lieutenant in the Army Corps of Engineers, which was established in 1802 at West Point to constitute a military academy. He was one of the first officers to receive formal training there.

For five years, Macomb directed construction of coastal fortifications in the Carolinas and Georgia. He also established fortifications at Fort Gratiot, Michigan, Chicago, Mackinaw, Prairie du Chien, St. Peter's, and St. Mary's in what was considered the Northwest area - Michigan and Illinois.

At the beginning of the War of 1812, in July 1812, Macomb was promoted at the age of 30 to colonel of the newly organised 3rd Artillery Regiment.

He was in command of the Sacketts Harbor garrison. Under Winfield Scott, he took part in the Capture of Fort George. He was part of James Wilkinson's failed St. Lawrence expedition and commanded his brigade at the Battle of Point Iroquois.

== Command at the Battle of Plattsburgh ==
He won acclaim during the War of 1812 as brigadier general in command of the Right Division of the Northern Army, responsible for defending the frontier of northern New York. At the Battle of Plattsburgh on September 11, 1814, with only 1,500 regular troops and some detachments of militia, he was opposed by a British force of 10,531 men under Lieutenant General Sir George Prevost. Macomb's heavily outnumbered troops fell back before the British columns in a series of encounters as Prevost advanced towards the American defensive works. In the weeks leading up to the battle, Macomb, knowing full well he would be greatly outnumbered, worked with his men to move trees and create fake roads; in order to obscure the genuine roads and lead the British into dead-end traps far from the three nearby American forts (a maneuver Macomb called abattis). The British attack was diffused by these efforts. The long, narrow lines of marching soldiers were unable to easily stop and about-face. They became entangled in the maze of false, narrow roads, where they became targets for an American ambush.

The British were about to launch an assault on the American defenses when the news came through of the defeat of the Royal Navy squadron on Lake Champlain. Prevost needed the British Lake Champlain squadron to supply his planned advance into Vermont. Without it, he had no choice but to abandon the expedition. Prevost and his forces returned to Canada. Macomb was showered with praise and styled "the Hero of Plattsburgh" by some in the American press. He was promoted to major general for his conduct at this battle, and received the formal thanks of Congress and a Congressional Gold Medal.

== Commanding General of the United States Army ==
When Major General Jacob Brown, the Army's commanding general, died in February 1828, Macomb was the senior brigadier general on the Army register, although, as the Army's chief of engineers, he was paid only at the rank of a colonel. President John Quincy Adams promoted him to commanding general of the Army with the rank of major general. The Army's two serving brigadier generals — Winfield Scott and Edmund P. Gaines — had been vying for the position. Their quarrels over seniority had scandalized the Army, and Adams bypassed them to offer the post to Macomb.

The general's last active service in a theater of war was in the Seminole War in Florida, in 1835.

Macomb's tenure as Commanding General was marked by "continuing uncertainty about the responsibilities and authority of his position. To secure his seniority over Scott and Gaines, both two-star brevet major generals, Macomb added a provision in the 1834 regulations that 'the insignia of the major general commanding in chief should be three stars.' In the same document he sought to define his relationship to the Secretary of War and establish his primacy over the bureau chiefs, including his successor as Chief of Engineers. This was easier said than done. Most issues were not fully resolved until early the next century."

He advocated doubling Army strength, increasing enlisted pay, providing relief for some widows and orphans, and regularizing the officer retirement and replacement system. In 1840 the Army Corps of Engineers adopted the castle uniform insignia and first described the Corps of Engineers' distinctive Essayons button (Motto in French, meaning: "Let us try").

Macomb was succeeded by Major General Winfield Scott, who had worked "hard at mending fences in the intervening 13 years ..." within the Army.

== Writings and other works ==
In 1809, Macomb was the author of a seminal book (republished in 2006) on martial law and the conduct of courts-martial. It was the first book written on American procedures. During this period, he was serving as a judge-advocate general (JAG) in the Army. He published a revised, updated book solely on courts-martial in 1809.

He also wrote a play, c. 1826, on the siege of Detroit by Ottawa chief Pontiac. It features Macomb's maternal grandfather, Robert Navarre, who helped defend the settlement. The play was published and later performed in Washington, D.C. during Macomb's residency. See Published Works and Further Reading, infra.

In addition, Macomb is recognized as an artist. His painting Detroit as Seen from the Canadian Shore in 1821, a watercolor and pencil work, is held by the Detroit Institute of Arts.

== Engineers as commanding generals ==
Macomb was the first of five Commanding Generals (Chiefs of Staff after the 1903 reorganization) who had held Engineer commissions early in their careers. All had transferred to other branches before being appointed to this top position. The others were George B. McClellan, Henry W. Halleck, Douglas MacArthur, and Maxwell D. Taylor.

== Congressional Gold Medal ==
Following the Battle of Plattsburgh and the end of the War of 1812, a Congressional Gold Medal honoring Alexander Macomb and his men was struck by Act of Congress (3 Stat. 247), to wit:

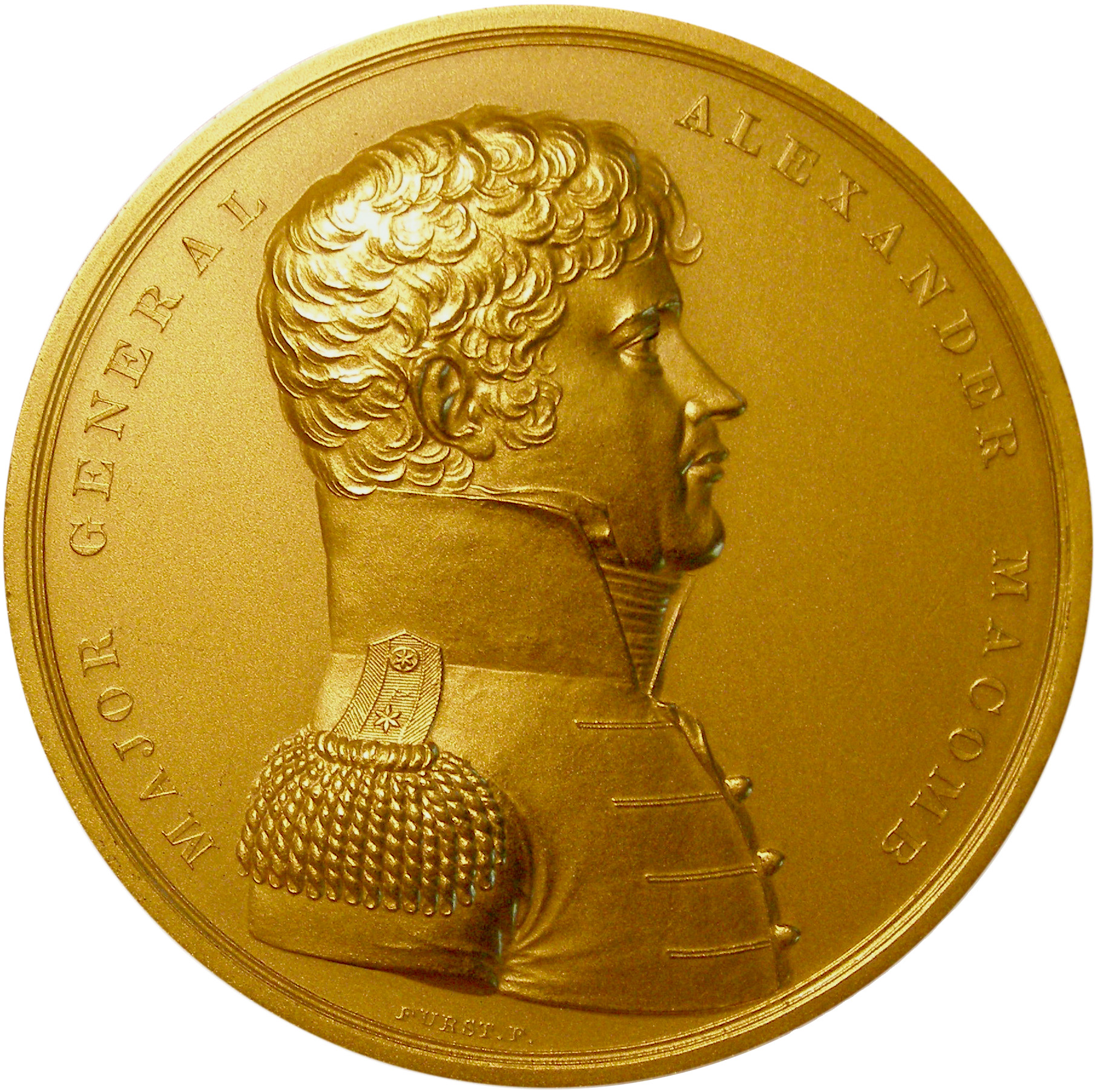
(obverse)

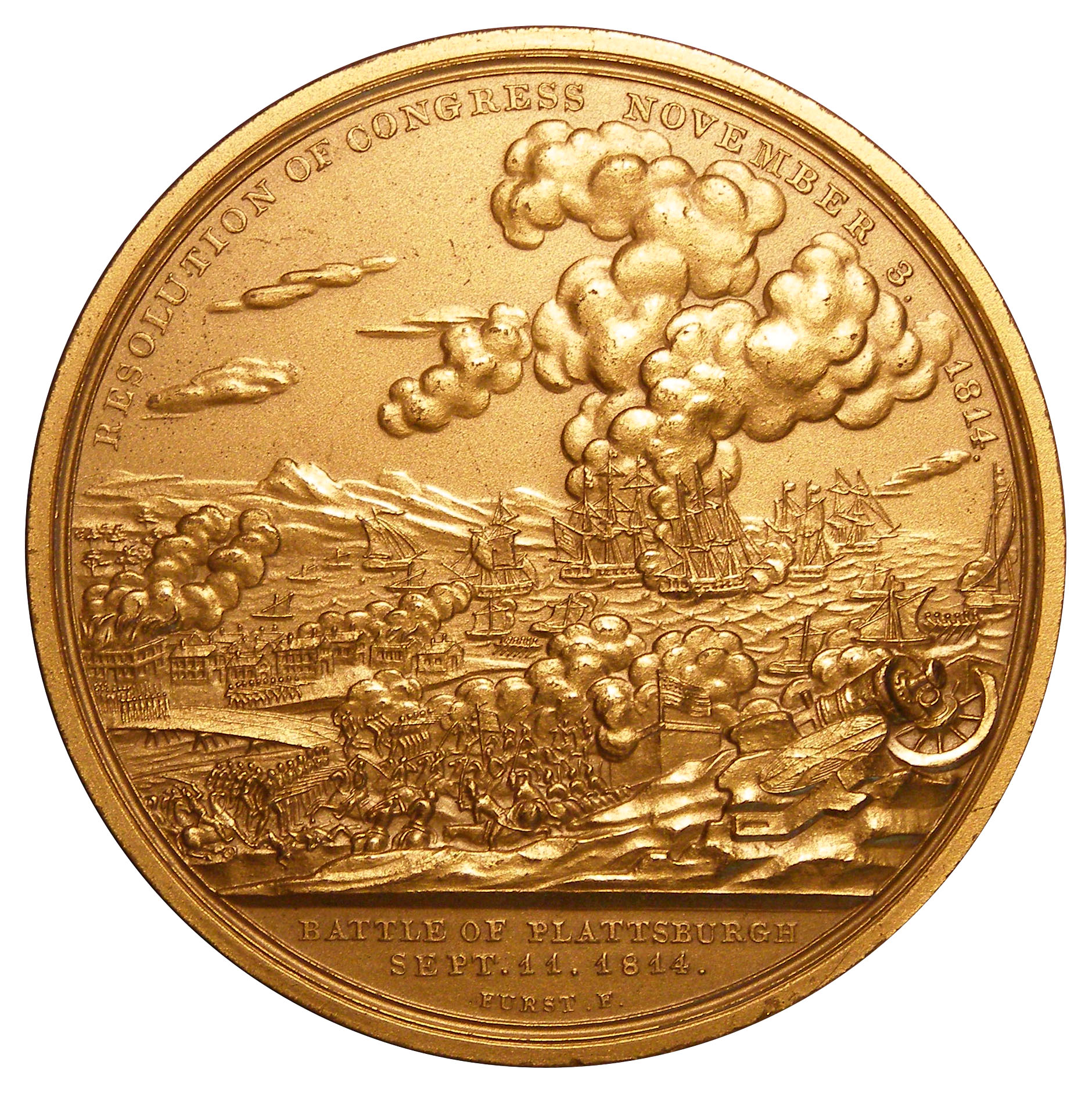
(reverse)

Macomb's Congressional Medal Marshall Davies Lloyd Collection

Resolved, That the thanks of Congress be, and they are hereby presented to Major General Macomb, and, through him, to the officers and men of the regular army under his command, and to the militia and volunteers of New York and Vermont, for their gallantry and good conduct, in defeating the enemy at Plattsburg (sic) on the eleventh of September; repelling, with one thousand five hundred men, aided by a body of militia and volunteers from New York and Vermont, a British veteran army, greatly superior in number, and that the President of the United States be requested to cause a gold medal to be struck, emblematic of this triumph, and presented to Major General Macomb. – Resolution of Congress November 3. 1814.

Obverse: MAJOR GENERAL ALEXANDER MACOMB. Bust of Gen. Macomb, in uniform, facing the right FÜRST. F(ecit). indicates the engraver Moritz Fuerst, who designed several medals of 1812 heroes for the Philadelphia mint. The bust of Macomb found on the Congressional Medal, however, is reminiscent of the 1809 portrait of Macomb by Saint-Mémin, in which Macomb is wearing the undressed coat of blue with black velvet collar and cuffs typical of an Engineering officer.

Reverse: RESOLUTION OF CONGRESS NOVEMBER 3. 1814. The American army repulsing the British troops, who are striving to cross the Saranac river. To the left, Plattsburgh in flames; to the right, naval battle on Lake Champlain; in the distance, Cumberland Head. Exergue: BATTLE OF PLATTSBURGH September 11. 1814. FÜRST. F(ecit).

This was one of 27 Gold Medals authorized by Congress arising from the War of 1812.

== Historical recognition ==
Alexander Macomb is recognized by a Michigan Historical Marker installed at the corner of Gratiot Avenue and Macomb Street in Mount Clemens, Michigan, the county seat of Macomb County, named for him. It is Registered Site S0418, erected in 1974. It states:

Alexander Macomb

In 1818 Territorial Governor Lewis Cass proclaimed the third Michigan county to be called Macomb. At that time the young General was Commander of the Fifth Military Department in Detroit. Born in that city in 1782, son of prominent local entrepreneurs, Macomb had entered the U.S. Army in 1799. He had gained national renown and honor during the War of 1812 for his victory at Plattsburgh in September 1814 over a far superior force of British invaders. Later as Chief Army Engineer he promoted the building of military roads in the Great Lakes area. From May 1828 to his death in June 1841, Macomb served as Commander in Chief of the Army. He is buried in the Congressional Cemetery in Washington D.C. His birthday, April 3, is honored as Macomb County Heritage Day.

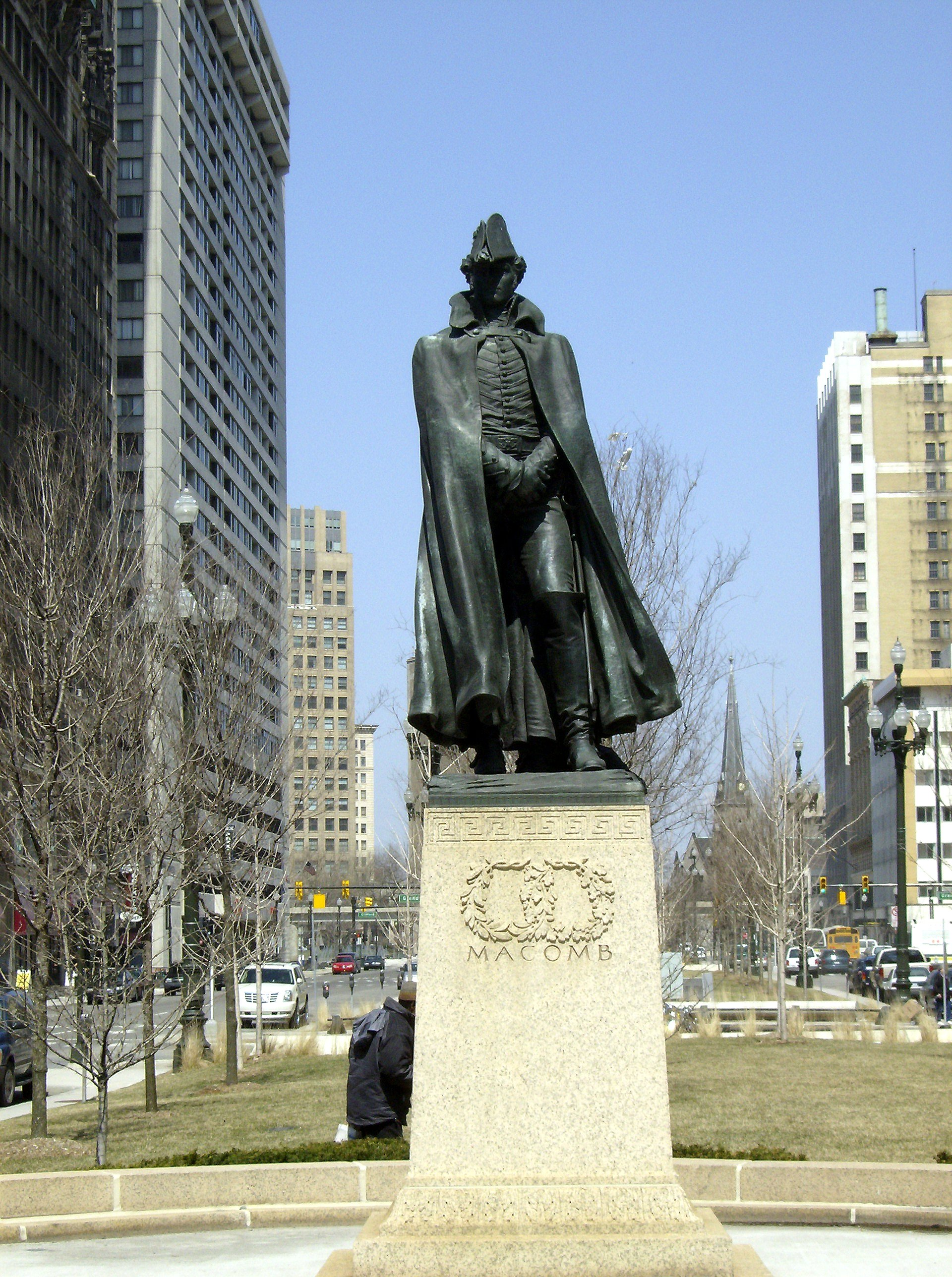
Statue of Alexander Macomb in Detroit by Adolph Alexander Weinman

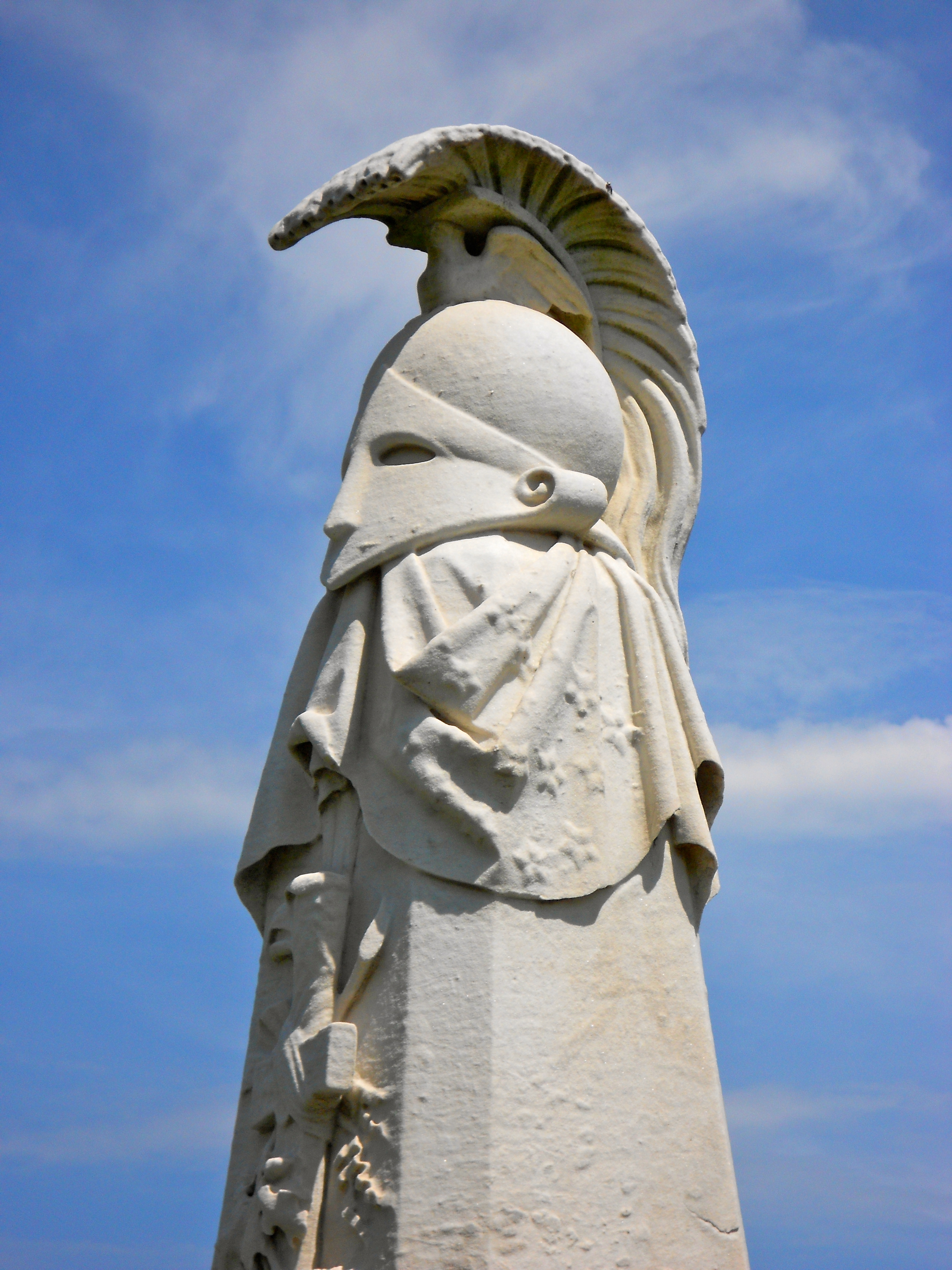
Grave in the Congressional Cemetery

He is memorialized by several monuments. One statue of Alexander Macomb was sculpted by Adolph Alexander Weinman and erected in 1906 in downtown Detroit, Michigan. This statue was made from melted down cannons, and was a notable and monumental task. Another is in downtown Mount Clemens, Michigan, in front of the Circuit Court building at 40 North Gratiot Avenue. Several others exist.

Macomb died while in office at Washington, D.C. He was originally buried at the Presbyterian Burying Ground, but in 1850 his remains were disinterred and he was reburied at Congressional Cemetery.

His remains, and those of his wife, Catherine, were disinterred again in June 2008 so that the brick-lined burial vault beneath their 6-ton (5,400 kg), 13-foot-tall (4.0 m) marble monument could be repaired to prevent its impending collapse. During the month it took to make the necessary repairs, the couple's remains were held at the Smithsonian; they were viewed by several of the general's descendants, including his great-great-great-granddaughter. After the $24,000 repairs were completed by the Department of Veterans Affairs, their remains were re-interred on July 17, 2008. The monument to Alexander Macomb is "one of the most unusual in the nation."

=== Societies ===
During the 1820s, Macomb was a member of the Columbian Institute for the Promotion of Arts and Sciences, who counted among their members former presidents Andrew Jackson and John Quincy Adams and many prominent men of the day, including well-known representatives of the military, government service, medical and other professions.

== Legacy and eponymous locations ==
His youngest son was Commodore William H. Macomb.

In World War II, the United States Liberty ship SS Alexander Macomb was named in his honor. See, List of Liberty ships: M-R.

In addition to the ship, Alexander Macomb has been the source for the name of a number of locations, communities, and institutions around the country, including:

- Fort Macomb
- Macomb Township and Macomb County, Michigan
- Macomb Community College
- Macomb, Illinois
- Macomb Mountain (New York), one of the Adirondack High Peaks named in his honor. There are three variant spellings.
- Village of McComb, Ohio (Note: The reason for the spelling, "McComb" instead of "Macomb", is that the village was named by a Scotsman who fought under Macomb at the Battle of Plattsburg, and he used the Scottish manner of pronunciation and spelling.)
- The Alexander Macomb Chapter of the Daughters of the American Revolution is situated in Mount Clemens, Michigan, and was founded in June 1899.
- Macomb Street. A street named after the general in the City of Plattsburgh.
- Macomb Street. A street named after the general in Washington, District of Columbia.
- Macomb Hall, a dormitory on the Plattsburgh State college campus, several miles from the shore of Lake Champlain.
- Alexander Macomb Academy School and the Alexander Macomb Early Learning Center are located in Mount Clemens, Michigan.
- Macomb Reservation State Park
- An elementary school named after him in Detroit opened in 1929 and closed in 2009.
- Macomb Street, A street named after the general in Monroe, Michigan.

== Published works ==
- Macomb, Alexander, A Treatise on Martial Law, and Courts-Martial; as Practiced in the United States. (Charleston: J. Hoff, 1809), republished (New York: Lawbook Exchange, June 2007), ISBN 1-58477-709-5, ISBN 978-1-58477-709-0, 340 pages.
- Macomb, Alexander, Pontiac: or The Siege of Detroit. A drama, in three acts, (Boston: Samuel Colman, 1835), edited (Marshall Davies Lloyd, February 2000) 60 pages.
- Macomb, Alexander, Major General of the United States Army, The Practice of Courts Martial, (New York: Harper & Brothers, 1841) 154 pages.
- See Samuel Cooper infra.

== Dates of rank ==
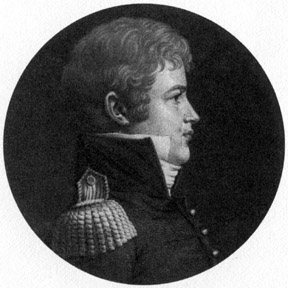
Maj. Alexander Macomb (Charleston, SC 1809), by Charles-Balthazar-Julien Fevret de Saint-Mémin

Macomb's effective dates of rank were:

- Cornet, Light Dragoons – January 10, 1799
- 2nd Lieutenant, Light Dragoons – March 2, 1799
- Honorably discharged – June 15, 1800
- 2nd Lieutenant, 2nd Infantry – February 16, 1801
- 1st Lieutenant, Engineers – October 12, 1802
- Captain, Engineers – June 11, 1801
- Major, Engineers – February 23, 1808
- Lieutenant Colonel, Engineers – July 23, 1810
- Colonel, 3d Artillery – July 6, 1812
- Brigadier General – January 24, 1814
- Brevet Major General – September 11, 1814
- Colonel, Chief Engineer – June 1, 1821
- Major General – May 24, 1828

== See also ==
- List of books about the War of 1812

== Notes ==
Military offices
Preceded by Abimael Y. Nicoll	Adjutant Generals of the U. S. Army; April 28, 1812 – July 6, 1812 (acting)	Succeeded by Thomas H. Cushing
Preceded by Walker Keith Armistead	Chief of Engineers; 1821–1828	Succeeded by Charles Gratiot
Preceded by Jacob J. Brown	Commanding General of the U.S. Army; 1828–1841	Succeeded by Winfield Scott
