= Lawyers Building =

- U.S. National Register of Historic Places
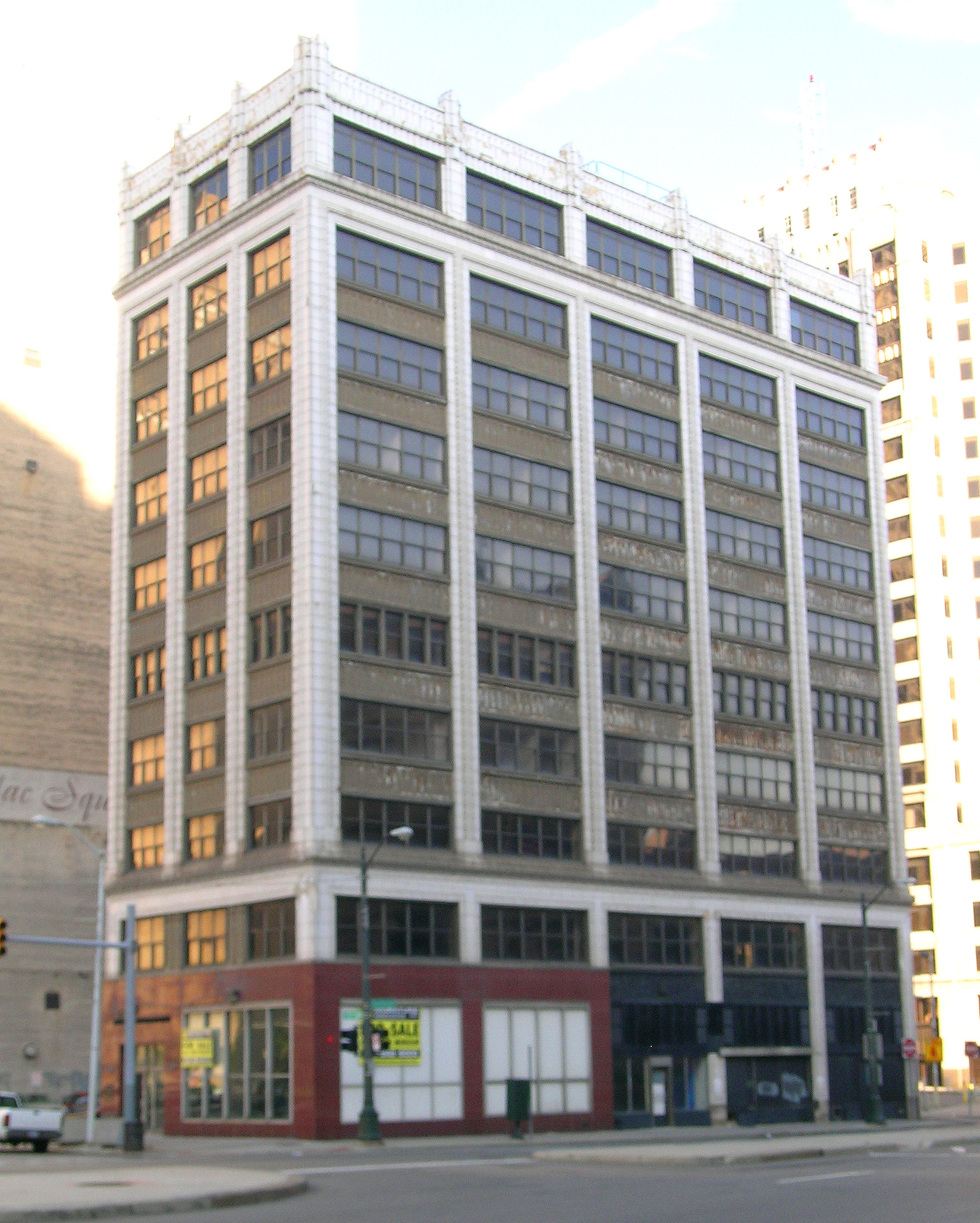
- Interactive map
- Location: 137 Cadillac Square; Detroit, Michigan
- Coordinates: 42°19′54.88″N 83°2′38.19″W
- Built: 1922
- Built by: Misch, Otto, Co.
- Architect: Bonnah & Chaffee
- Architectural style: Chicago School
- NRHP reference No.: 82002903
- Added to NRHP: April 22, 1982

The Lawyers Building is an office building located at 137 Cadillac Square in downtown Detroit, Michigan. It was also known as the American Title Building. The building was listed on the National Register of Historic Places in 1982.

== History ==
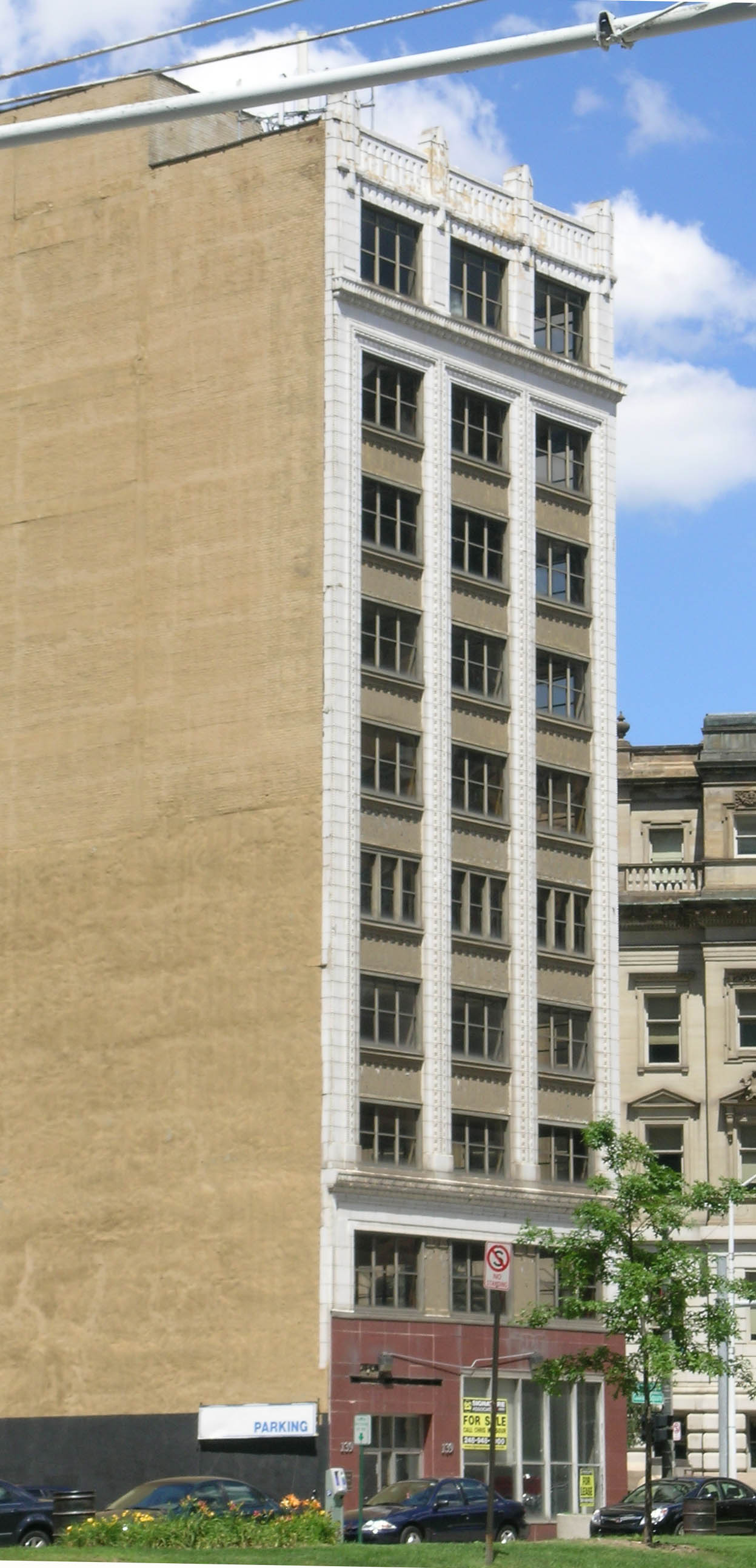
Lawyers Building from the northwest

The Lawyers Building was built in 1922, the first building erected by John J. Barlum and his family in their rebuilding of the Cadillac Square area. The building originally catered to middle class level tenants, including many unions and benevolent organizations.

It later was renamed the American Title Building, and the upper floors were closed in the 1980s. Renovation of the building began in 2017, and a new hotel opened in the building in 2019.

== Description ==
The Lawyers Building was designed in the Chicago School architectural style, and is constructed of reinforced concrete and steel faced with terra cotta. It stands at 10 floors in height, featuring regular bays with grouped wood casement windows with metal spandrel panels. It was one of the few office buildings of the time that strove for modernism over ornamentation. It is currently the finest nearly unaltered Chicago-style highrise in Detroit; the only change made to the building is the modern marble ground-level storefront.

The building is located east of the larger New Cadillac Square Apartments and Cadillac Tower (both also built by Barlum), and west of Wayne County Building, at the corner of Cadillac Square, and Randolph Avenue. It was added to the National Register of Historic Places in 1982.

== See also ==
- Other buildings designed by Bonnah & Chaffee:

- Cadillac Tower
- Merchants Building
