= Philip Breitmeyer =

American politician

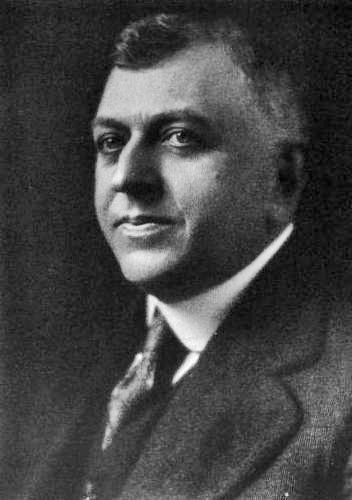

44th Mayor of Detroit, Michigan
- In office 1909–1910
- Preceded by: William Barlum Thompson
- Succeeded by: William Barlum Thompson

Personal details
- Born: May 13, 1864 Detroit, Michigan
- Died: November 8, 1941 (aged 77) Detroit, Michigan
- Spouse: Katie Grass
- Profession: Florist

Philip Breitmeyer (May 13, 1864 – November 8, 1941) was a florist, one of the founders of Florists' Telegraph Delivery (now Florists' Transworld Delivery, or FTD), and the mayor of Detroit, Michigan.

== Biography ==
Philip Breitmeyer was born in Detroit on May 13, 1864, the son of John and Fredericka Schneider Breitmeyer. He was educated in the public schools of the city, and joined the family florist business, John Breitmeyer & Sons. He soon became president of the firm, and after his father's death bought out his brothers to become sole owner of the firm. The business grew rapidly, and they built a new building to house the firm, now the Breitmeyer-Tobin Building.

Breitmeyer was one of the organizers, and served as president, of Florists' Telegraph Delivery (now Florists' Transworld Delivery, or FTD). He was president of the American Society of Florists, president of the Michigan Cut Flower Exchange, vice-president of the German-American Bank director of the Lohrman Seed Company, and president of the Detroit National Fire Insurance Company.

In 1886, Breitmeyer married Katie Grass. The couple had three children, Philip Jr, Harry G. and Katherine.

== Politics ==
Breitmeyer was appointed by George P. Codd as Commissioner of Parks and Boulevards for the city of Detroit, a position he held for two years. So well did he perform that he was nominated as the Republican candidate for mayor, and was elected for a term in 1909-1910.

Breitmeyer ran again for mayor in 1933, but was soundly defeated by James Couzens's son Frank. He also served for two years, 1938-1939, on the Detroit City Council.

Philip Breitmeyer died on November 8, 1941.

Political offices
Preceded by William Barlum Thompson	Mayor of Detroit; 1909–1910	Succeeded by William Barlum Thompson
