= Harvard Square Centre =

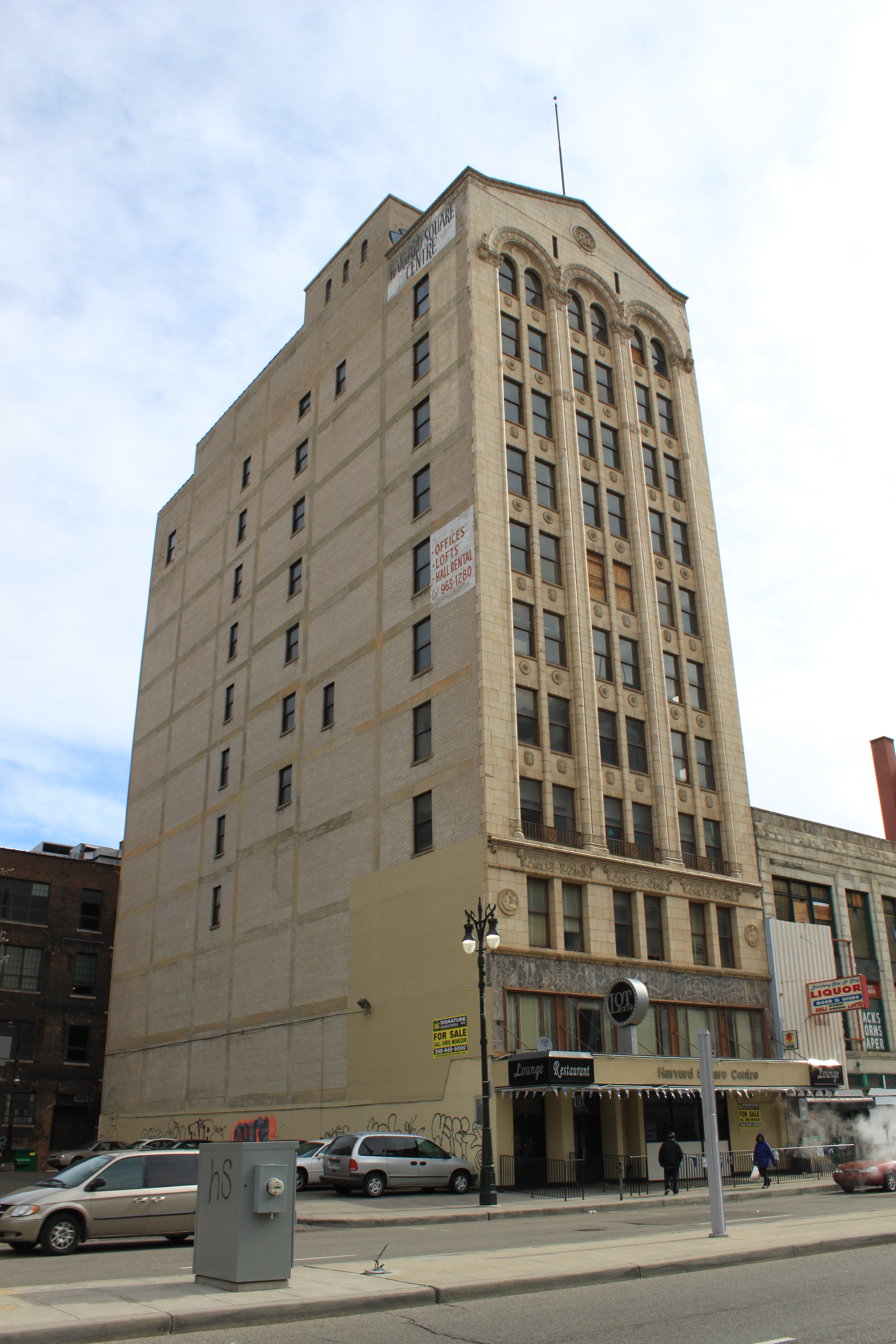

General information
- Architectural style: Beaux-Arts, Romanesque Revival
- Location: 1344-1346 Broadway Street; Detroit, Michigan
- Coordinates: 42.3352°N 83.0462°W
- Completed: 1925

Technical details
- Floor count: 12

The Harvard Square Centre is a building located at 1344–1346 Broadway Street in Downtown Detroit, within the Broadway Avenue Historic District and next to the Merchants Building. It was built in 1925 and stands at 12 floors in height, designed in the Beaux-Arts architectural style with Romanesque accents. It is currently unused. The current plans for the building calls for a renovation that will include 21 loft apartments. Heritage National Investment has proposed converting the building into 21 residential loft apartments.
