= Oscar Marx =

American politician

Oscar B. Marx
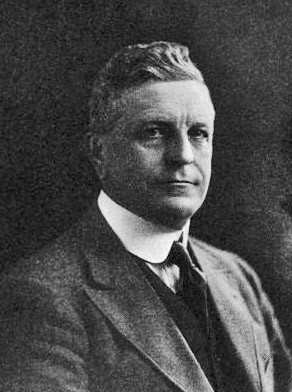

46th Mayor of Detroit, Michigan
- In office 1913–1918
- Preceded by: William Barlum Thompson
- Succeeded by: James J. Couzens

Personal details
- Born: July 14, 1866 Detroit, Michigan
- Died: November 23, 1923 (aged 57) Detroit, Michigan
- Spouse: Lydia Darmstaetter

Oscar B. Marx (July 14, 1866 – November 23, 1923) was an American political figure, who was mayor of Detroit from 1913 to 1918.

== Biography ==
Marx was born on July 14, 1866, in Wayne County, Michigan, the son of German immigrants Stephen and Eleanor Busch Marx. Marx attended the Detroit public schools and the German-American Seminary, and spent much of his early life farming, but as Detroit and Hamtramck, Michigan grew, the encroaching cities swallowed the Marx farm. Marx's father Stephen sold the farm, giving him and his brothers several thousand dollars to start a business. Oscar Marx used this money to buy into a bankrupt optical firm, the Michigan Optical Company, in 1891, and steered the company to become one of the largest in the region.

In addition to being president of the Michigan Optical Company, Marx was a member of the board of directors of the Standard Computing Scale Company and vice-president of the Robert Oakman Land Co.

In 1897, Marx married Lydia Darmstaetter; the couple had two children: Lydia Marx and Oscar B. Marx Jr.

== Politics ==
In 1894–95, Marx was the Detroit estimator-at-large. In 1895 he was elected as an alderman, a position he held for eight years. In 1904, Marx ran for City Treasurer, but was beaten. He served as a delegate to the Republican National Convention in 1908 (and was again a delegate to the Republican National Convention in 1916). In 1910, he was appointed City Assessor, and two years later saw his first term as Detroit's mayor. Marx served three terms in all as mayor.

Marx was friends with Robert Oakman and John Dodge, and the three men controlled the Republican Party in Southeast Michigan for much of the 1910s.

Marx appointed James J. Couzens, the man who would become the next mayor, to take over the Detroit police force, and in February of his final year in office Marx created a committee to oversee the feasibility of construction the Outer Drive bypass in the city.

Oscar Marx died on November 23, 1923.

Political offices
Preceded by William Barlum Thompson	Mayor of Detroit; 1913–1918	Succeeded by James J. Couzens
