= Tyree Guyton =

American artist (born 1955)

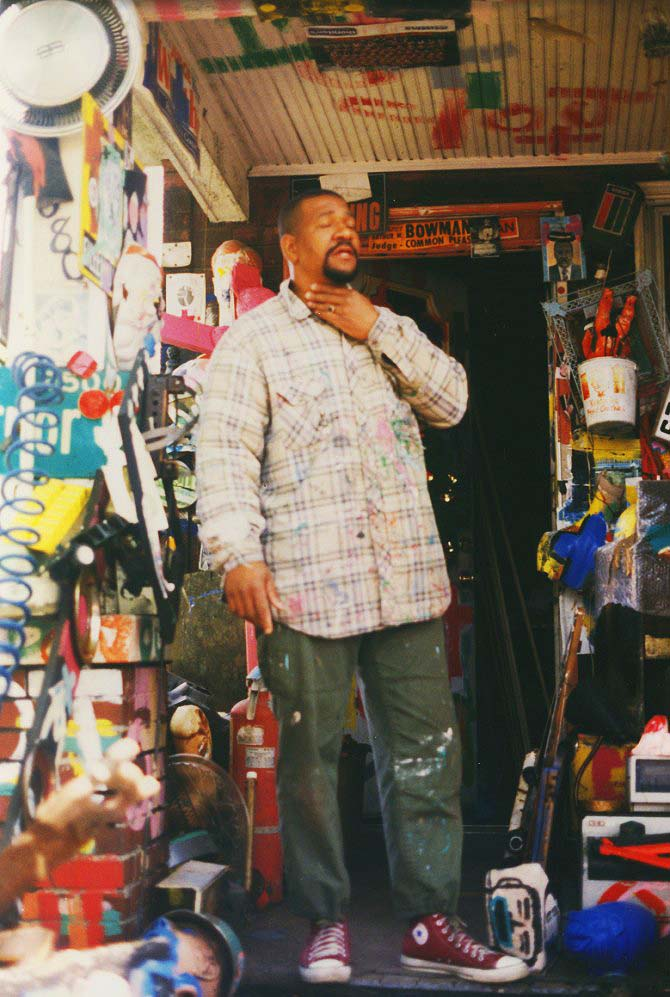
- Born: August 24, 1955 (age 71); Detroit, MI
- Education: Marygrove College; Wayne State University; The Center for Creative Studies
- Spouse: Jenenne Whitfield

Tyree Guyton (born August 24, 1955) is an artist from Detroit, Michigan. He is married to Jenenne Whitfield and continues to live in Detroit. Before becoming an artist, Guyton worked as a firefighter and an autoworker and served in the U.S. Army. He studied art at Marygrove College, Wayne State University, and the Center for Creative Studies—now College for Creative Studies. Guyton counts his grandfather, Sam Mackey, and Detroit artist Charles McGee as his greatest influences.

== Early life into adulthood ==
Guyton was raised on Heidelberg Street, a residential neighborhood on Detroit's east side, which influenced him throughout his life. In his childhood, he frequently visited the Detroit Institute of Arts with his grandfather. Guyton also grew up during the Detroit riots of 1967. He proceeded to complete high school and serve in the U.S. Army. After his time in the military he decided to pursue his dream of being an artist. He began taking night classes under the artist Charles McGee, at the College for Creative Studies.

== Art career ==
Since creating the Heidelberg Project with his grandfather in 1986, Guyton has received international recognition as an artist, educator, and community leader.

Although he is an honorary director on the Heidelberg Project board of directors, in recent years he has concentrated his efforts on his art exhibitions as well as on lecturing and teaching. In 2007, he accepted a position teaching an honors program at the Wayne State University.

Guyton's work has been installed and displayed across the world, including a feature in 1999 by the United States Department of State in the Art in Embassies Program with an exhibition in the American Embassy in Quito, Ecuador. Permanent installations of his work have been established in Sydney, Australia, at the Detroit Institute of Arts, and in Mount Vernon, New York.

Tyree Guyton has received the following awards for his contributions as an artist and humanitarian: Wayne County International Artist Award (2003), Award of Recognition, Mayor Kwame Kilpatrick (2002), Best Known Artist in Metro Detroit, Detroit Free Press (2001), "Michigan Artist of the Year," Governor John Engler, State of Michigan (1992), Humanity in the Arts Award, Wayne State University (1992), "Michiganian of the Year Award," State of Michigan (1991), David A. Harmond Memorial Scholarship (1990), "Testimonial Resolution Award," Wayne County, Lansing, Michigan (1990), "Spirit of Detroit Award," Detroit City Council, Detroit, Michigan (1989).

In 1999, Tyree Guyton was the subject of an HBO Films documentary, "Come Unto Me: The Faces of Tyree Guyton". This film won numerous honors, including an Emmy Award for editing in 2000 and honorable mention at the Sundance Film Festival for director Nicole Cattell.

In 2005, Guyton and the Heidelberg Project were featured on the Vision TV documentary "Urban Shrines", produced by Toronto-based Markham Street Films. In 2007, his work was included in the French documentary Detroit: The Cycles of the Mental Machine, featuring Techno artists Mike Banks and Carl Craig, directed by Jacqueline Caux. In 2008, Guyton was a featured speaker at the inaugural Great Lakes ReUse Conference. The illustrated children's book Magic Trash, by Jane Shapiro, covers Guyton's biography and the Heidelberg Project.

In 2026, Guyton was named Kresge Eminent Artist by Kresge Foundation.
