= Albert Weinert =

German-American sculptor (1863–1947)

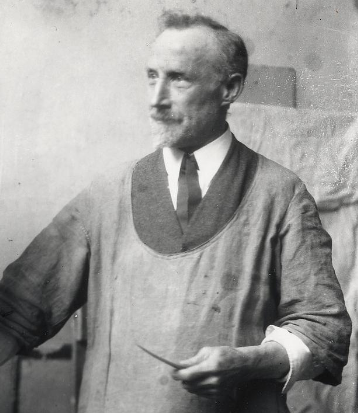
- Born: June 13, 1863; Leipzig, Kingdom of Saxony
- Died: November 29, 1947 (aged 84); Bronx, New York, US
- Education: Royal Academy of Art and Applied Art; Académie Royale des Beaux-Arts
- Known for: Sculpture

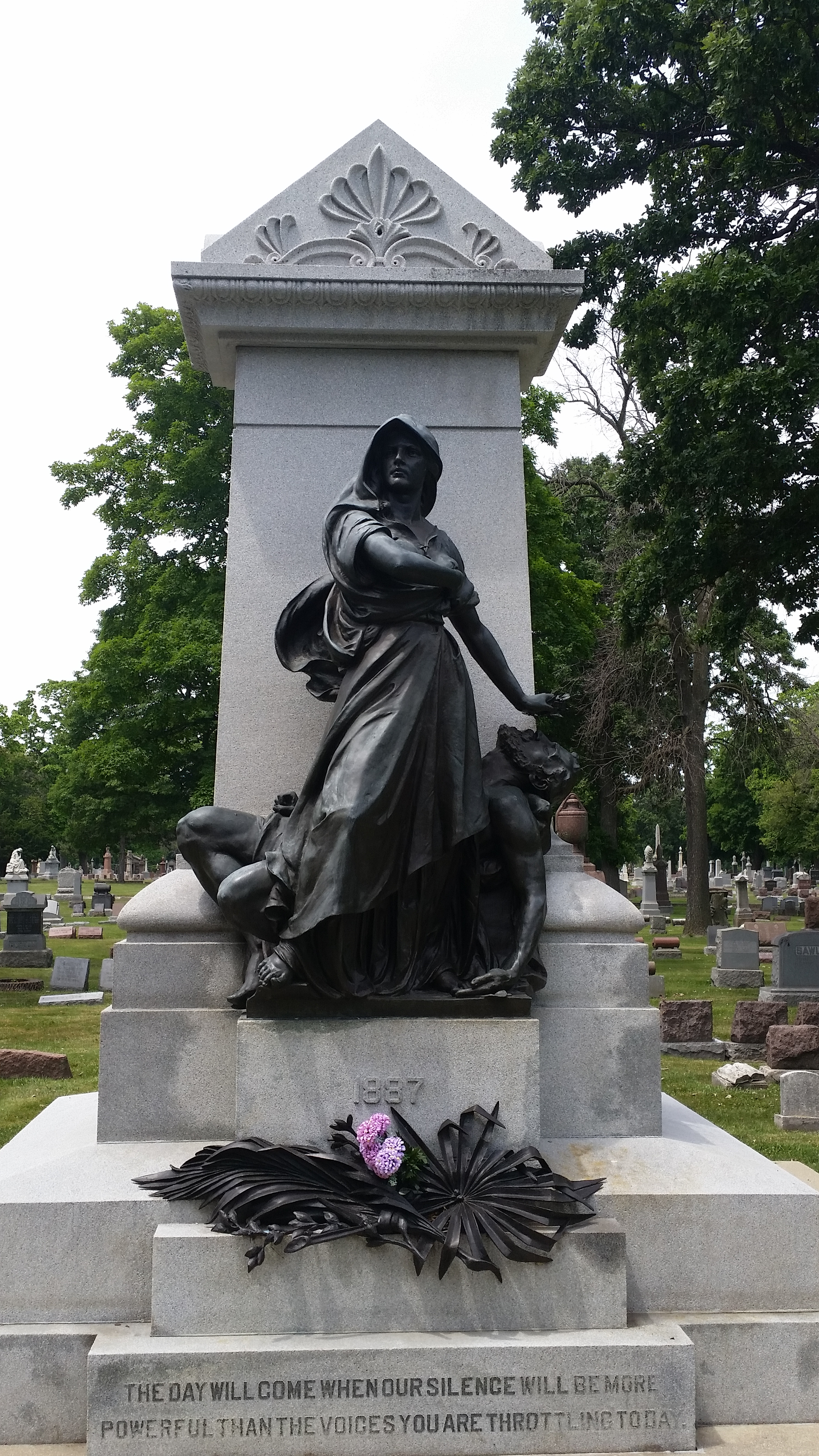
Weinert's 1893 Haymarket Martyrs' Monument, Forest Home Cemetery, Forest Park, Illinois

Albert Weinert (June 13, 1863 – November 29, 1947) was a German-American sculptor.

Born in Leipzig, Kingdom of Saxony, Weinert attended the Royal Academy of Art and Applied Art there and then the Académie Royale des Beaux-Arts in Brussels, Belgium.

In 1886, he emigrated to the United States, working first in San Francisco before moving to Chicago in 1892 to work on the World's Columbian Exposition where he met fellow sculptor Karl Bitter. After the fair, Weinert traveled with Bitter to New York City where he worked in Bitter's studio. He later relocated to Washington, D.C. where, in April 1894, he was hired to work on the design of the Thomas Jefferson Building of the Library of Congress. He was paid $10 per day (equivalent to $372 in 2025) to oversee a crew of modelers and carvers.

He died on November 29, 1947, in his home studio on Grand Concourse in the Bronx.

== Work ==
- Haymarket Martyrs' Monument, German Waldheim Cemetery, Chicago, 1893
- The Court of Neptune Fountain, Library of Congress, Washington, D.C.

He produced the granite dolphins carved on the spandrels behind the bronze groups by Perry 1898

- Numerous details in the Library of Congress, notably in the Reading Room.
- The Battle of Lake George, Lake George Battlefield Park, Lake George, New York 1903
- William McKinley Monument, Toledo, Ohio, 1903
- Stevens T. Mason, Detroit, 1908
- Cecil Calvert Monument, Baltimore, 1908
