= New Cadillac Square Apartments =

High-rise residential apartment building in Michigan

Coordinates: 42°19′54.9″N 83°2′39.4″W

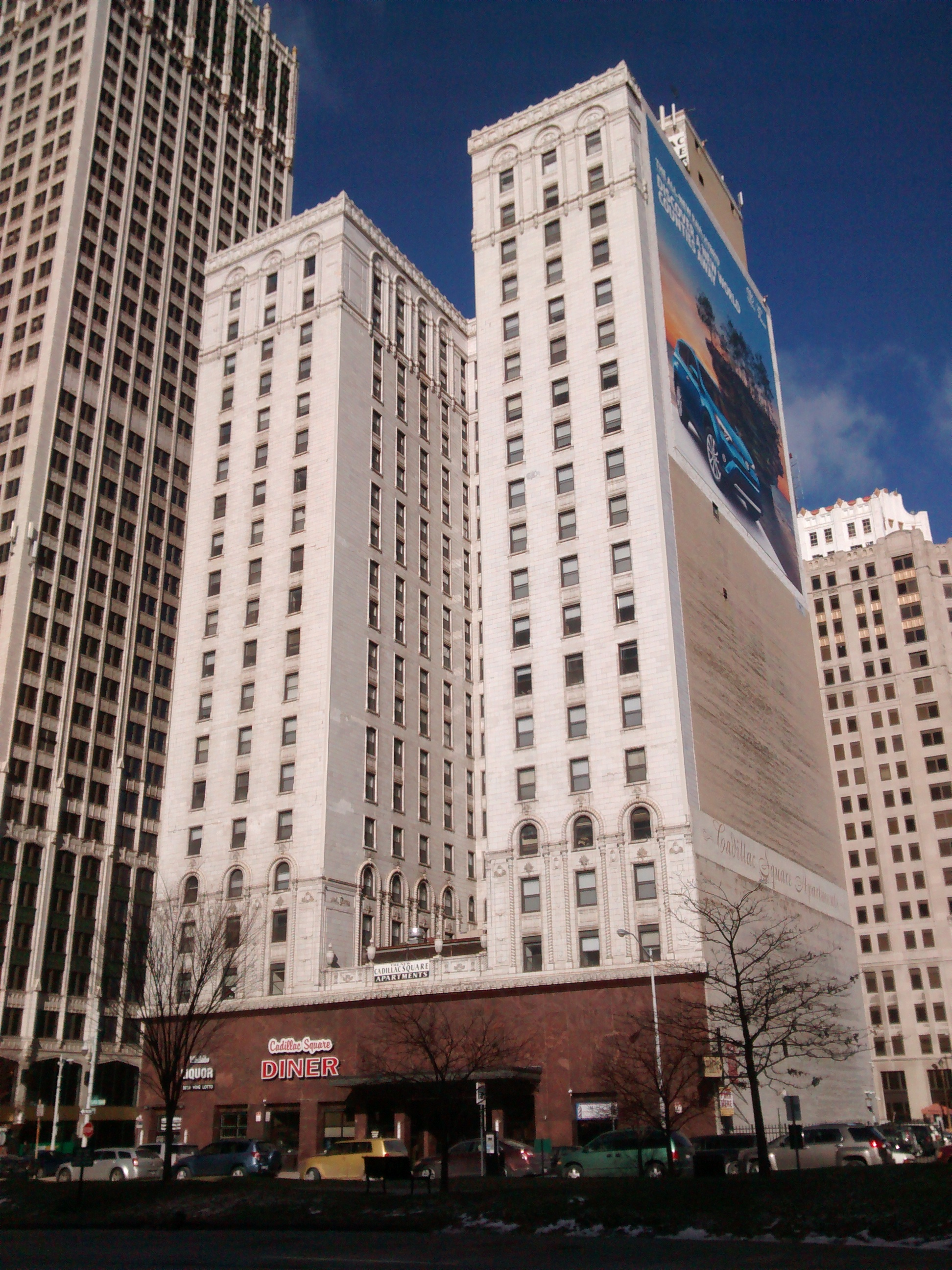

The New Cadillac Square Apartments is a high-rise residential apartment building, standing at 111 Cadillac Square on the intersection with Bates Street in Detroit, Michigan.

Construction on the building was started in 1926 and finished in 1927. It was built in the Beaux-Arts architectural style, and consists of terra cotta as its main material. It stands 21 floors and has 224 units/rooms, including a restaurant.
