= Detroit Chimera Graffiti Mural =

Mural by Kobie Solomon in Detroit, Michigan

Coordinates: 42.377699°N 83.061081°W

The Detroit Chimera Graffiti Mural is a mural by artist Kobie Solomon on the west-facing wall of the Russell Industrial Center's building number two located at 1600 Clay Avenue in Detroit, Michigan. The mural, completed(the mural has never been completed, Kobie never got the compensation to finish the job.) between 2010 and 2012, measures 8,750 square feet (813 m^{2}) making it the largest mural in the state of Michigan, and, with its chimera, would like to represent the spirit of the city. A Detroit Red Wings symbol can be found within the wing of the Chimera. The Mural can be seen from Interstate 75. The mural was commissioned by the Russell Industrial Center.
