= Russell Industrial Center =

Building complex in Detroit, Michigan

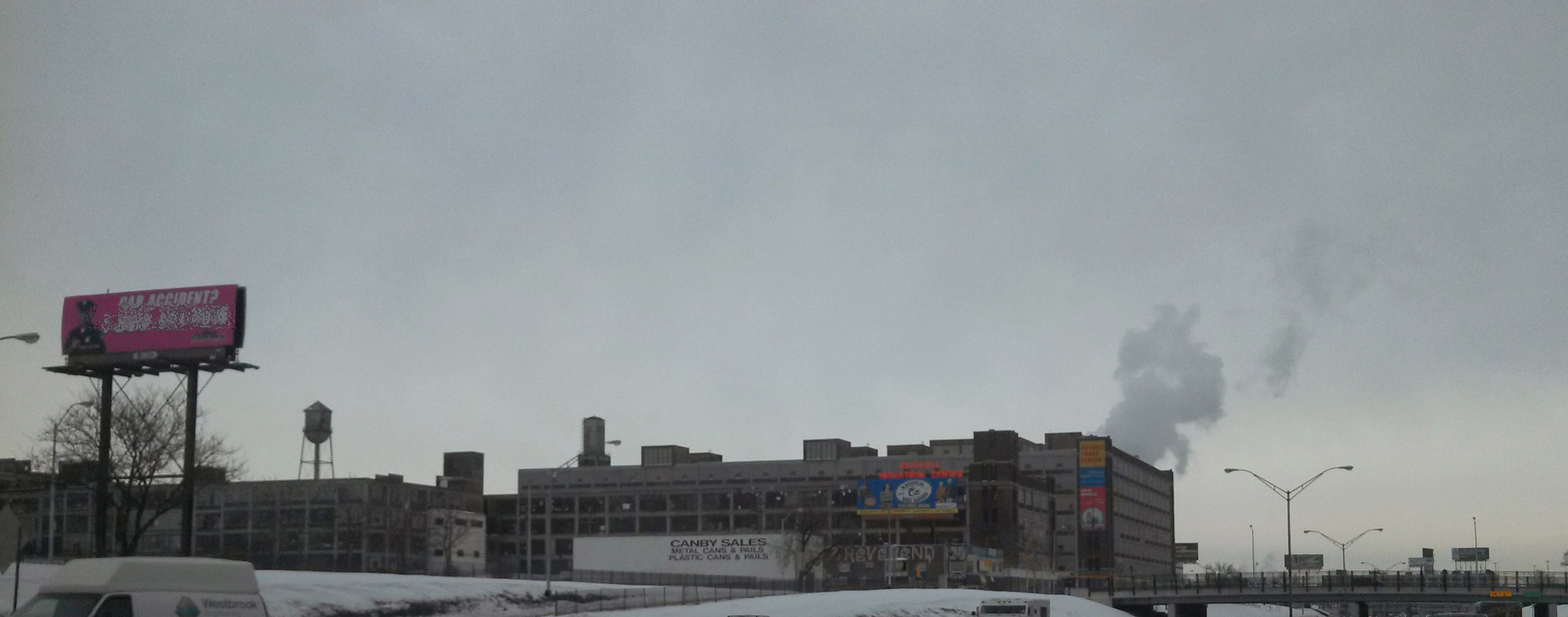
- Interactive map of Russell Industrial Center
- Location: 1600 Clay Street, Detroit, Michigan 48211; United States
- Coordinates: 42.37735°N 83.06089°W
- Owner: Dennis Kefallinos

Construction
- Opened: 1960

Website
- https://www.russellindustrialcenter.com/

The Russell Industrial Center is an industrial factory turned to commercial complex of studios and shops that is located at 1600 Clay Street in Detroit, Michigan. The Russell Industrial Center is a 2,200,000-square-foot (200,000 m^{2}), seven building complex, designed by Albert Kahn for John William Murray in 1915. It contains studios and lofts and serves as a professional center for commercial and creative arts.

Murray Body Corporation supplier of bodies to Ford and the third largest auto-body company in the U.S. built the complex for its business in 1924. Murray soon diversified its business leaving the automotive industry in 1955.

The complex has become another of Detroit's renovated buildings. In 2003 Dennis Kefallinos purchased it and converted it into more than one million square feet of studio space and lofts for various artists, creative professionals, and businesses. The Russell Industrial Center works with non profits, local colleges, and businesses. Kefallinos owns several Detroit businesses, such as Nikki's Pizza in Greektown.

== History ==
John William Murray, born 1862, in Ann Arbor, Michigan formed the J W Murray Mfg. Co. in 1913 to supply sheet metal parts for the automobile factories in the Detroit area. The first plant was located in Detroit, at 1975 Clay Street, which is next to the Grand Trunk Western Railroad line and borders Fordyce, Morrow, Marston and Clay Streets. Murray Manufacturing began manufacturing automobile bodies, stamped fenders, hoods, cowls and frames. The growing demands from customers, such as the Dodge brothers, Ford Lincoln, Crosley, Willys, Hudson, Hupmobile, King and Studebaker, led Murray to expand his operations.

In 1915 Murray hired architect Albert Kahn, to design a larger industrial center to meet the demands of Detroit's growing automotive industry. Kahn was one of Detroit's foremost industrial architects, known for his large concrete-reinforced automobile factories. His design was strong, fireproof, inexpensive to construct, and opened up by eliminating heavy obstructive columns. Another characteristic was providing a large amount of windows and gaslight to give factory workers an ample amount of natural light.

J W Murray Mfg. Co merged with another of Henry Ford's major suppliers, C R Wilson Body Co, when Wilson's owner and founder died. Adding some more smaller firms they formed Murray Body Corporation in 1924 and became after Fisher and Briggs the third largest body company in the United States. J W Murray retired soon after the merger and his son set up his own new business. Murray Corporation's new president, Allan Sheldon, made a series of costly mistakes which created financial difficulties when combined with the sharp recession of 1924–1925. However sales rebounded in 1925 and following a financial reorganisation Murray Corporation of America was formed to continue the business.

In the 1940s Murray Corporation manufactured military supplies, airplane wings and other components of the fighter/bomber planes, and washing machines for Montgomery Ward. When the war came to an end, expressways opened up the city of Detroit to the surrounding suburbs. This led to suburbanization, and another recession for Murray Corporation. Murray Corporation continued manufacturing automotive parts until 1955.

In 1960 Packard Properties (Helmsley-Spear Inc., of New York) renamed the complex Russell Industrial Center and began leasing out space describing the complex as an 11-plant "apartment house for industry". At that time tenants already included sixty manufacturing and distribution firms and more than half a million square feet remained available. A later owner of the Russell Industrial Center was Leona Helmsley who purchased the complex in 1970 and sold it in 1991, to printer Wintor-Swan. In 1998, the Russell was damaged by a tornado and storm that flooded and destroyed the building's transformer and many of the windows. The Swan Company experienced financial difficulties and could not afford to stay in business. The building stood vacant and in disrepair until its purchase by Dennis Kefallinos, owner of Boydell Development Company, for one million dollars.

Due to safety code violations, the building has been ordered vacated as of Feb. 21, 2017. By 2018 issues with the city had been resolved and the Russell Industrial Center transformed into a center for small business and the arts. It is currently home to over one hundred small businesses and artists.

== Renovation ==
Since the structure of Kahn's building was made of concrete and was covered in windows, Kefallinos decided that it would be suitable for art studios and began plans to create several lofts for studio space. His efforts are an example of Urban development in Detroit. His plan to transform an industrial building into lofts, and promote the arts is recognized as one of the many urban renewal efforts in the city of Detroit.

In 2010 artist Kobie Solomon painted the Detroit Chimera Graffiti Mural on building number 2.

== Events ==
- The Russell Bazaar, is an indoor marketplace, open the first week end of the month, where more than 150 local merchants and artists sell their wares. Booth rental is available for a small fee; final approval by management ensures customers have a variety of goods to choose from with preference given to booths selling original or unique merchandise. Each month a booth is offered for free to raise money for the non profit group The Russell Industrial Center for Creative Studies.
- The annual People's Art Festival, is open to the public and features a variety of art, entertainment, food and merchandise for sale in the complex courtyards. Some of the tenants open their doors within the complex to welcome the public to visit their studios. In addition to art and merchandise, entertainment is provided on a number of stages on the complex grounds, featuring a variety of music from local musicians. Admission to the event is free to the public, sponsored by non profits and local businesses, where more than 200 visual artists, film makers, musicians and other performers can give back to the community and integrate the city with Detroit's creative community and promote the arts in the city.

== See also ==
- Culture of Detroit
- History of Detroit
