= Heidelberg Project =

Public outdoor art project

Coordinates: 42°21′31.23″N 83°1′16.88″W

The Heidelberg Project is an outdoor art project in the McDougall-Hunt neighborhood on Detroit's east side, just north of the city's historically African-American Black Bottom area. It was created in 1986 by the artist Tyree Guyton, who was assisted by his wife, Karen, and grandfather Sam Mackey ("Grandpa Sam"). The Heidelberg Project is in part a political protest, as Tyree Guyton's childhood neighborhood began to deteriorate after the 1967 riots. Guyton described coming back to Heidelberg Street after serving in the Army; he was astonished to see that the surrounding neighborhood looked as if "a bomb went off".

At first, the project consisted of him painting a series of houses on Detroit's Heidelberg Street with bright dots of many colors and attaching salvaged items to the houses. It was a constantly evolving work that transformed an inner-city neighborhood where people were afraid to walk, even in daytime, into one in which neighbors took pride and where visitors were many and welcomed. Despite the area being characterized by high levels of blight and poverty, the evolving art work grew, Tyree Guyton worked on the Heidelberg Project daily with the children on the block. He and director Jenenne Whitfield gave lectures and workshops on the project around the country. Their main goal was to develop the Heidelberg Project into the city's first indoor and outdoor museum, complete with an artists' colony, creative art center, community garden, amphitheater, and more. In 2005 the Heidelberg Project was awarded the Rudy Bruner Award for Urban Excellence silver medal.

== Demolition and destruction ==
The city government of Detroit has demolished some of Guyton's projects. The first time was Guyton's "The Baby Dollhouse" in 1989. Then, at five in the morning on November 26, 1991, city bulldozers and police appeared at another one of his art pieces unannounced. They gave him fifteen minutes to retrieve items he wanted to save from destruction. Another demolition of the Heidelberg Project was ordered under Mayor Dennis Archer, on February 4, 1999, of the houses Guyton termed "Your World," "Happy Feet," and "The Canfield House".

=== 2013/2014 arson incidents ===
Starting in 2013, a number of houses in the Heidelberg Project have suffered fires. Arson is suspected in most of these cases. To date, there have not been any arrests. Even prior to 2013, arson was common in the McDougall-Hunt neighborhood, as eight to ten houses were estimated to have burned down annually prior to 2006.

==== 2013 ====
"Obstruction of Justice (OJ) House"

On May 3, 2013, the "Obstruction of Justice" house was largely destroyed by a fire beginning around 3:30 am.

Late in the evening of November 11/12, 2013, the "House of Soul" burned to the ground.

Early morning November 21, 2013, the "Penny House" was burned.

Early morning November 28, 2013, the "War House" was burned.

Late evening December 8, 2013, "Clock House" was burned.

==== 2014 ====
Early morning March 7, 2014, "The Party Animal House" aka "The Doll House" was burned.

Early morning September 18, 2014, the house known as "Detroit Industrial Gallery" was burned. The house had been decorated by artist Tim Burke with figurines and placards, and painted different colors.

Early morning September 30, 2014, a house known as the "Birthday Cake House" was burned. This house was not part of the Heidelberg Project, but was located on Heidelberg Street near the project. It was decorated with painted pictures of birthday cakes.

Early morning November 23, 2014, a house known as the "Taxi House" was burned, badly damaging the rear and interior of the house.

== 25 Years ==
The Heidelberg Project celebrated its 25th anniversary in 2011.

"Penny Car"

The Heidelberg Project is recognized around the world as a demonstration of the power of creativity in creating hope and a bright vision for the future. Some of the houses that remain on Heidelberg Street include the "New White House (formerly Dotty Wotty)", "Number House" along with the Detroit Industrial Gallery, and artist studio/home that was purchased and maintained by Detroit artist Tim Burke.

The Heidelberg Project hopes to offer a new approach to the growing problems of urban sprawl and decay facing many American and other international "Shrinking cities". This approach has garnered international attention, especially since the Heidelberg Project continues its maturation. The 20th Anniversary of the Heidelberg Project was celebrated on August 26, 2006, with a community festival, an event that ended a year of special attention. MTV producers filmed a segment for its show Made using the Heidelberg Project as a backdrop. Fashion model Kate Moss visited the Heidelberg Project with photographer Bruce Webber to photograph the City of Detroit for a special edition of W magazine in June 2006. In 2007, two books were published about the Heidelberg Project. A children's book was written by Linda McLean, and a coffee-table book, entitled Connecting the Dots: Tyree Guyton's Heidelberg Project was published by Wayne State University Press. In 2011, the HP released its first children's book, "Magic Trash: A Story of Tyree Guyton and His Art".

In 2008, the project was one of 15 projects representing the United States at the 2008 Venice Architecture Biennale.

Musician Alex Winston filmed the video for her song "Choice Notes" at the Heidelberg Project.

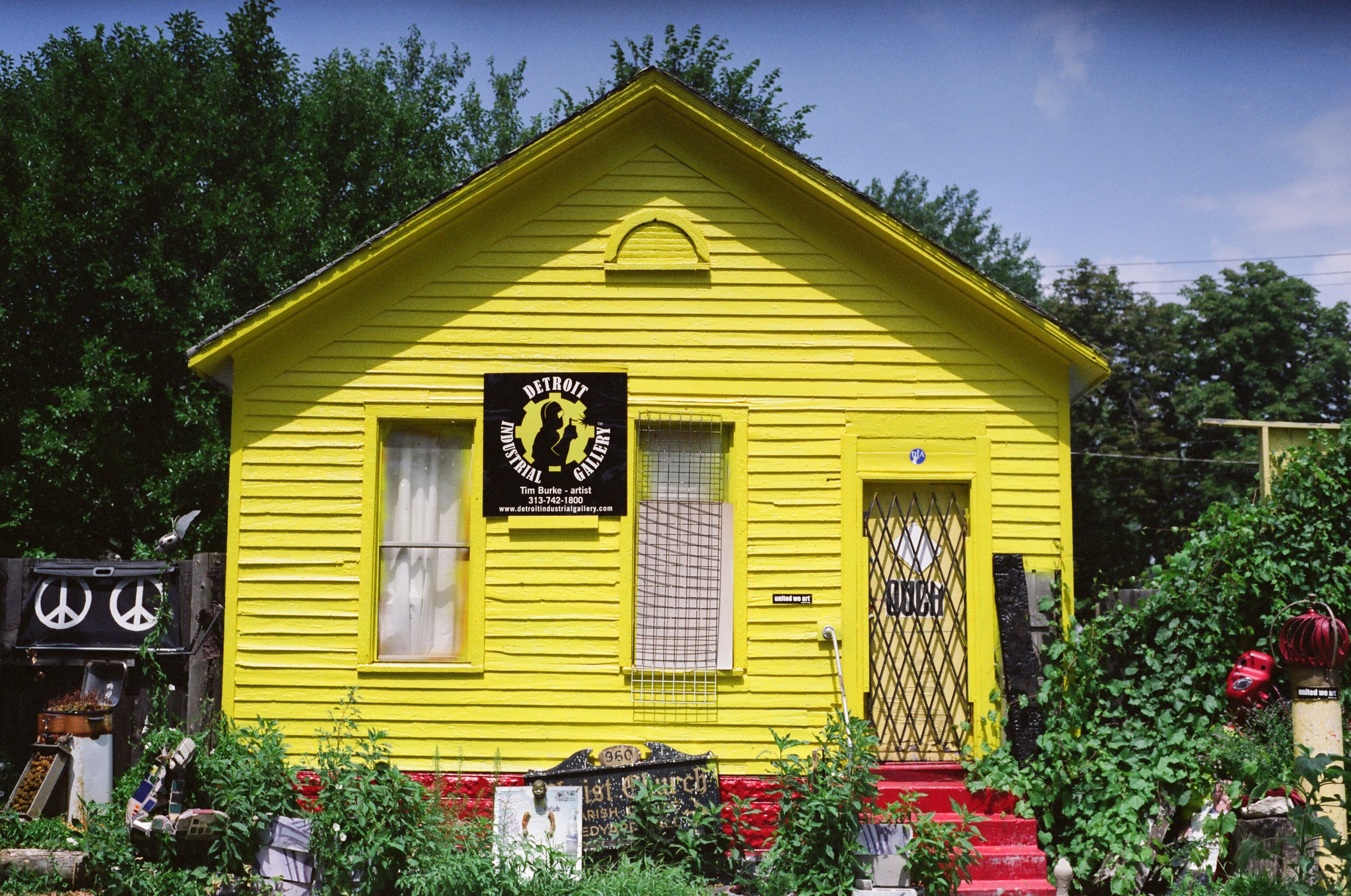
Detroit Industrial Gallery

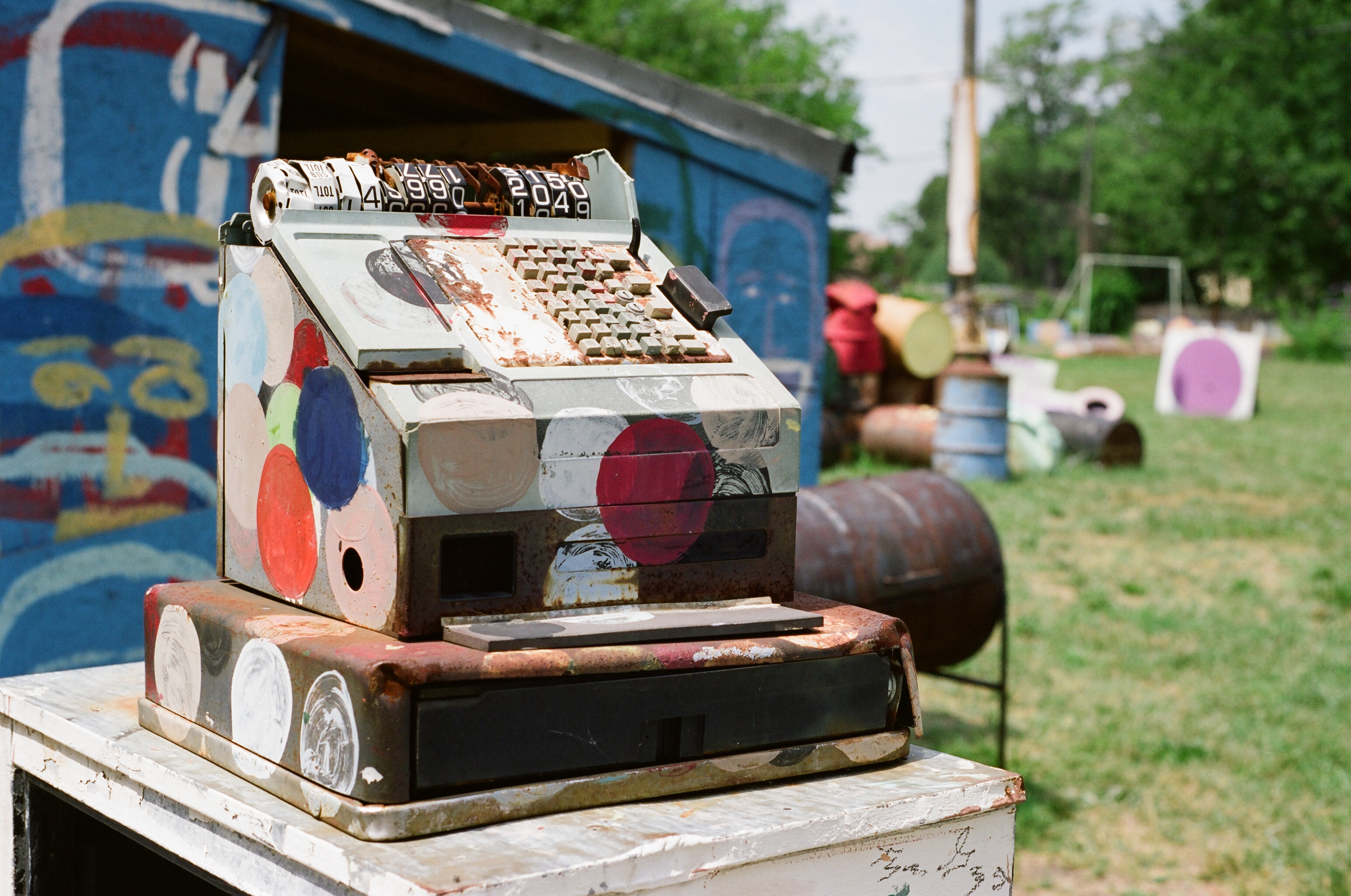
Cash Register

== 30 Years ==
In 2016 Tyree Guyton announced that the Heidelberg Project would be dismantled "piece-by-piece in a very methodical way". The future project "Heidelberg 3.0", is referred to as an "arts-infused community." Potential plans include donating dismantled parts of the installation to museums, and converting the Dotty Wotty House into a museum. During this period the digital transformation firm Isobar announced plans to utilize drones to capture images of the Heidelberg Project in order to create a virtual reality experience. In 2018, Isobar offered the Heidelberg Project app for Apple iPhone and Android mobile devices.
