= William Barlum Thompson =

American politician

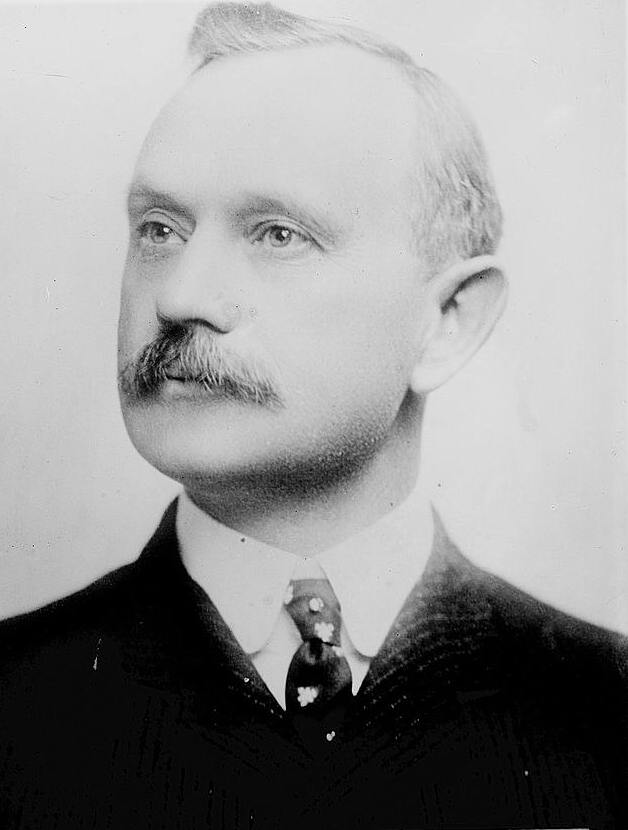

43rd Mayor of Detroit, Michigan
- In office 1907–1908
- Preceded by: George Pierre Codd
- Succeeded by: Philip Breitmeyer

45th Mayor of Detroit, Michigan
- In office 1911–1912
- Preceded by: Philip Breitmeyer
- Succeeded by: Oscar Marx

Personal details
- Born: March 10, 1860 Detroit, Michigan
- Died: February 12, 1941 (aged 80) Detroit, Michigan
- Spouse: Nellie Hymes

William Barlum Thompson (March 10, 1860 – February 12, 1941) was the Mayor of Detroit from 1907 to 1908 and again from 1911 to 1912.

== Biography ==
William Barlum Thompson was born on March 10, 1860, in Detroit, the son of Thomas and Bridget Barlum Thompson. He graduated from the public schools of the city, and in 1876 from Goldsmith's Business University, located in Detroit.

He went into the meat-market business with his uncle Thomas Barlum, became a partner with Barlum in 1880, and set off on his own in 1882. In 1887 he married Nellie Hymes; the couple had nine children: Mary (born 1888), Kathleen (1889), Irene (1891), William Grover (1892), Francis Leo (1895), Helen M. (1897), Edna L. (1899), Edith R. (1905), and Virginia M. (1909).

== Politics ==
William Barlum Thompson was a Democrat, and served as an alderman for two terms, from 1891 to 1894, but declined to run for a third term. However, by popular demand, he ran again in 1896 and was re-elected. In 1897, he was elected city treasurer and resigned his seat as an alderman. He served as treasurer for nine years.

He was elected mayor twice, serving in 1907-1908 and again in 1911–1912.

== Later life ==
Thompson went into partnership with his cousin John J. Barlum, forming the Cadillac Square Improvement Company. The company constructed a number of buildings around Cadillac Square, including the Barlum Tower (now Cadillac Tower), the Barlum Hotel (now New Cadillac Square Apartments), and the Lawyers Building.

William Barlum Thompson died in Detroit on February 12, 1941.

Political offices
Preceded by George P. Codd	Mayor of Detroit; 1907–1908	Succeeded by Philip Breitmeyer
Preceded by Philip Breitmeyer	Mayor of Detroit; 1911–1912	Succeeded by Oscar Marx
