= L'Hommedieu =

L'Hommedieu may refer to:

== L'Hommedieu (surname) ==
- Ezra L'Hommedieu (1734–1811), American lawyer and politician
- Stephen S. L'Hommedieu (1806–1875), American newspaper publisher and railroad executive
- Wallace L'Hommedieu (1833–1916), American politician
- Irving L'Hommedieu (1865–1931), American lawyer and politician

== L'Hommedieu (middle name) ==
- Stephen L'Hommedieu Slocum (1859–1933), American military attaché
- Tillinghast L'Hommedieu Huston (1867–1938), American civil engineer and baseball team owner
- Colden L'Hommedieu Ruggles (1869–1933), American general
