= Stephen L'Hommedieu Slocum =

American military attache

Lieutenant Colonel Stephen L'Hommedieu Slocum (August 11, 1859 − December 14, 1933) was an American military attaché who served in several countries.

== Early life ==
Slocum was born in Cincinnati on August 11, 1859. He was a son of Col. Joseph J. Slocum and Sallie S. L'Hommedieu (1833–1895). His elder brother, Herbert Jermain Slocum, was also a prominent soldier. His sister, Margaret Oliva "Daisy" Slocum, was the wife of Sherman Flint.

His maternal grandparents were Alma (née Hammond) L'Hommedieu and Stephen Satterly L'Hommedieu, the president of the Cincinnati, Hamilton and Dayton Railroad Company. Among his maternal family were aunts Mary (wife of Henry Brockholst Ledyard Jr.) and Alma (wife of George D. Ruggles). His paternal grandparents were Margaret Pierson (née Germain Slocum and Joseph Slocum, one of the pioneer settlers of Syracuse. His aunt, Margaret Olivia Slocum, was the wife of Russell Sage (from whom she inherited his entire $70 million fortune following his 1906 death).

== Career ==
Slocum was involved in the Nez Perce War in 1877, during which he was a volunteer with the 7th Cavalry. He became a second lieutenant in the 18th Infantry in September 1979, and transferred to the 8th Cavalry in 1883, the year he graduated from infantry and cavalry school. He was promoted to first lieutenant in September 1889.

He was stationed in Montana, Texas, the Dakotas, Kansas and Missouri at different times between 1881 and 1905, and was an aide-de-camp on the staff of Brigadier General David S. Stanley until 1886. He marched with the 8th Cavalry from Texas to Fort Meade, South Dakota, in 1888. In 1896 he married Laura Garrison in Christ Church Cathedral, in St. Louis. In 1899 he was assigned to be the U.S. representative to observe the Second Boer War. Between 1899 and 1912 he was at various times military attaché in Lisbon, London, St. Petersburg, Sweden, and Norway, as well as being on detached service in India in 1907. He also was on the General Staff at Manila in the Philippines from 1905 to 1907. He was stationed on Governors Island in New York before World War I. He was assigned to United States Embassy in London during World War I and was awarded the Distinguished Service Medal by the U.S. and was made a Companion of the Order of the Bath by the U.K. government.

== Personal life ==
Slocum was married to Luna Garrison (1864–1928), a daughter of Daniel Garrison of the Missouri Pacific Railroad.

He died in Washington at his home, 2201 R Street, and was buried at Rock Creek Cemetery there.
