= B Hill =

B Hill may refer to:

== People ==
- A.B. Hill (1838–1887), New York Stock Exchange official
- Austin Bradford Hill (1897–1991), English epidemiologist and statistician
- David B. Hill (1843–1910), former governor of New York
- James B. Hill (1856–1945), American inventor
- Samuel B. Hill (Washington politician) (1875–1958), U.S representative from the state of Washington
- Samuel B. Hill (Ohio politician) (born 1862), member of the Ohio House of Representatives
- Walter Barnard Hill (1851–1905), former chancellor of the University of Georgia in Athens

For other people with the surname Hill and a forename beginning with B, see Hill (surname).

== Places ==
- Burgess Hill, a town in West Sussex, England, UK
