= Joseph J. Slocum =

Joseph Jermain Slocum (June 1833 – October 2, 1924) was an American colonel and businessman.

== Early life ==
Slocum was born in June 1833 in Syracuse, New York. He was a son of Joseph Slocum (1795–1863), one of the pioneer settlers of Syracuse (he was originally from Rensselaer County, New York), and Margaret Pierson (née Germain Slocum (1804–1891). His sister, Margaret Olivia Slocum, was the wife of Russell Sage (from whom she inherited his entire $70 million fortune following his 1906 death). After the Panic of 1837 and the decline of canal traffic following construction of railroads across the state, her father's businesses and warehouses began to fail.

His maternal grandfather was Maj. John Jermain, who served in the Westchester Militia during the American Revolution.

== Career ==
Slocum served "with honor" in the Civil War, and afterward resigned from the Union Army to go into business in Cincinnati. In 1878, he moved to New York to join Russell Sage, his brother-in-law, in business, serving as Receiver, Treasurer, and director of the Poughkeepsie and Eastern Railway. He served as director of the Metropolitan Trust Company until his death.

He was a member of the Union League Club and Metropolitan Club, the Military Order of Loyal Legion, Society of Colonial Wars and Society of Mayflower Descendants.

== Personal life ==
On June 8, 1854, Slocum was married to Sallie S. L'Hommedieu (1833–1895) in Hamilton County, Ohio. Sallie was a daughter of Alma (née Hammond) L'Hommedieu and Stephen Satterly L'Hommedieu, the president of the Cincinnati, Hamilton and Dayton Railroad Company. A member of a large and prominent family, Sallie's sister Mary was the wife of Henry Brockholst Ledyard Jr. and another sister, Alma, was the wife of George D. Ruggles. Together, they were the parents of:

- Herbert Jermain Slocum (1855–1928), who married Florence Allington Brandreth (1856–1910), a daughter of Benjamin Brandreth, in 1883. After her death in an automobile accident, Mary Eliza (née Ricketson) Carr (1863–1952), a daughter of John Howland Ricketson.
- Stephen L'Hommedieu Slocum (1859–1933), who married Luna Garrison (1864–1928), a daughter of Daniel Garrison of the Missouri Pacific Railroad.
- Margaret Oliva "Daisy" Slocum (1870–1946), who married Sherman Flint (1869–1954), son of Dr. Austin Flint, in 1899.

Following his sister's death in 1918, he received a bequest of $8,000,000. Joseph and both of his sons were executors of Sage's estate along with the attornets, DeForest Brothers, who were Robert W. DeForest and Henry deForest.

His wife Sallie died in September 1895 in New York City. Slocum died on October 2, 1924, at 791 Madison Avenue, his home in Manhattan where he lived with his daughter and son-in-law. In 1928, his children sold three houses, 35, 37 and 39 East 65th Street, to a builder who tore then down to build a "modern apartment house". The three houses had been purchased in 1866 by Russell Sage, who left them to his wife, who then left them to her brother, who left them to the three children upon his death in 1924.

=== Descendants ===
Through his son Herbert, he was a grandfather of Myles Standish Slocum (1887–1956) and Herbert Jermain Slocum Jr. (1886–1948) and the great-grandfather of John Jermain Slocum (1914–1997), a diplomat who "gathered what is considered the world's foremost Joyce collection"; he married Eileen Sherman Gillespie, a granddaughter of William Watts Sherman, who had briefly been engaged to John Jacob Astor VI.
