= Henry Brockholst Ledyard =

Henry Brockholst Ledyard may refer to:

- Henry Ledyard (1812-1880), American politician
- Henry B. Ledyard Jr. (1844-1921), American businessman and son of Henry Ledyard
