= Clemens von Ketteler =

German diplomat

Baron Clemens von Ketteler
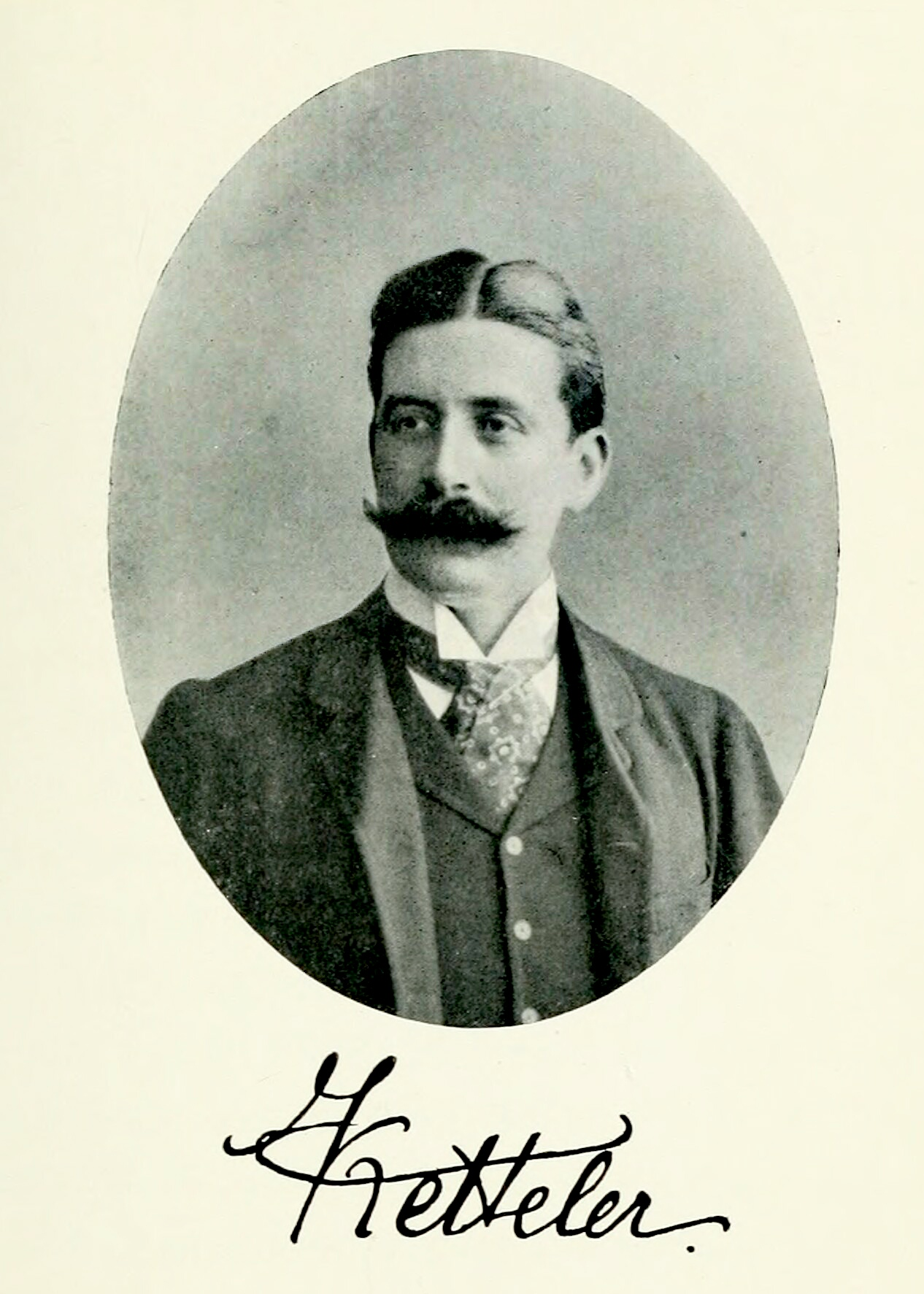

Minister of the German Empire to China
- In office 1899 – 20 June 1900
- Preceded by: Edmund Friedrich Gustav von Heyking
- Succeeded by: Alfons Mumm von Schwarzenstein

Personal details
- Born: 22 November 1853 Münster, Prussia, Germany
- Died: 20 June 1900 (aged 46) Peking, Qing China
- Spouse: Matilda Cass Ledyard (m. 1897)
- Relations: Wilhelm Emmanuel Freiherr von Ketteler (uncle)

Clemens August Freiherr von Ketteler (22 November 1853 – 20 June 1900) was a German career diplomat. He was killed during the Boxer Rebellion.

== Early life and career ==
Ketteler was born at Münster in western Germany on 22 November 1853 into a noble Münsterland family. He was the son of Cäcilie von Luck und Witten and August Joseph von Ketteler, who died shortly before his birth.

His uncle, Wilhelm Emmanuel Freiherr von Ketteler, was a theologian and Zentrum politician who served as Bishop of Mainz. His nephew, the diplomat Wilhelm Freiherr von Ketteler, was murdered by the Sicherheitsdienst des Reichsführers SS (SD) in Vienna in 1938 for his opposition to Hitler. Another relative was the French marshal Louis Franchet d'Espèrey. A cousin, Marguerite Watson, was married to Prince Charles Philippe, Duke of Nemours (son of Prince Emmanuel, Duke of Vendôme).

Following his graduation in Münster and Coesfeld in 1873, Ketteler entered the Prussian Army and served in it until he was appointed to join the Imperial German diplomatic corps in 1882.

Between 1880 and 1889 he served as an interpreter in the German consulates in Canton (Guangzhou) and Tianjin. After working in the German Department of Foreign Affairs for a short period, he was posted to Washington, D.C., between 1892 and 1896 and then to Mexico from 1896 to 1899.

== Boxer rebellion and death ==
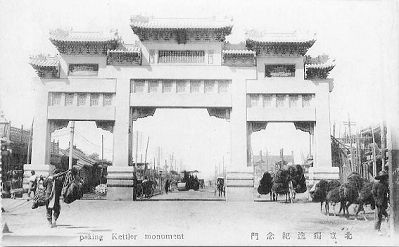
The Ketteler Gate as it stood in Dongdan from 1903 to 1918.

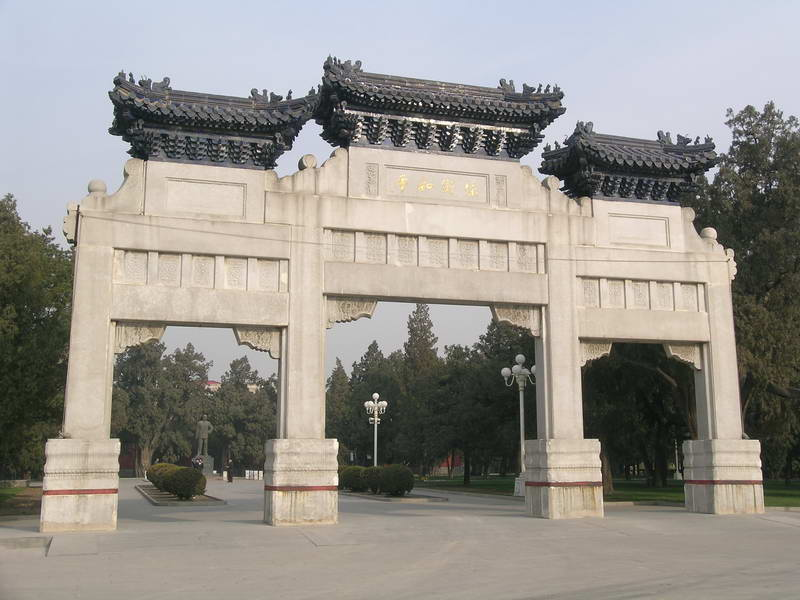
The stone archway erected by the Chinese government (Qing) at the time to commemorate Baron von Kettler, killed during the Boxer Movement in 1900 after being moved to Zhongshan Park.

Ketteler returned to China in 1899 as Plenipotentiary at Beijing, from where he pointed out in vain the dangerous situation for the Europeans.

On 11th June 1900, Sugiyama Akira attempted to wait for Allied reinforcement in the train station only to be assassinated and torn apart by Ganxu Braves.

On 12 June 1900, when the Boxers moved to the inner city and burned down Christian church buildings, Ketteler reacted by ordering German embassy guards to hunt them down. One such incident, is when he assaulted a suspected Boxer traveling through the legation which gave an unsuccessful chase and the capture of Boxer's son. In response, thousands of Chinese Muslim Gansu Braves under General Dong Fuxiang of the Imperial Army and Boxers went on a riot. The Gansu braves and Boxers then attacked and killed Chinese Christians around the legations in revenge for foreign attacks on Chinese. Angry at the Chinese Christians for collaborating with foreigners who were murdering the Chinese, the Boxers burned some of them alive and attacked and ransacked their property.

On 16th June, the mayor of Peking visited the legations on release of the boy only to find he was dead, allegedly shot him dead in a fit of rage.

On 17 June, the Chinese Muslim Gansu Braves mounted an assault on Ketteler and his German Marines at the Legations. After stones were hurled at the Germans by the Chinese Muslims, Ketteler told his men to shoot back at Muslim forces. The Muslim troops were feared by the Westerners, so the British minister Sir Claude Macdonald warned that "When our own troops arrive we may with safety assume a different tone, but it is hardly wise now." He thus warned Ketteler about his shooting incident with the Muslim army.

On 18 June, German troops captured a Chinese civilian suspected of being a Boxer in the inner city and took him to the Legation Quarter, where he was detained.

At 8.00 a.m. on 20 June, Ketteler, together with his interpreter and other associates, headed for the Zongli Yamen (the Ministry of Foreign Affairs) accompanied by armed escorts. At the western end of Xizongbu Hutong, only one block away from the ministry, the party was intercepted by a cart with what appeared to be Chinese Imperial lancers, though another source states they were Manchu Hushenying bannerman. One of them approached Ketteler's palanquin and shot Ketteler at point blank range, killing him instantly.

En Hai later gave himself up to the Allied occupying forces. He was subsequently tried and convicted, and was executed in Beijing on 31 December 1900 by beheading. He showed no emotion during interrogation, and was fully composed and calm, admitting to killing Ketteler, and even requested execution, saying "I received orders from my sergeant to kill every foreigner that came up the street...I am glad to die for having killed one of the enemies of my country." When questioned about whether he had consumed alcohol during the incident, En Hai said he had not "touched a drop". En Hai was praised as "brave and dignified", and called a "hero".

Ketteler was succeeded by Alfons Mumm von Schwarzenstein as ambassador of the German Empire in Beijing, who signed the Boxer Protocol on behalf of Germany. After his death, his widow returned to America to be with her family.

== Personal life ==
On 24 February 1897, he was married to the American heiress Matilda Cass Ledyard in Detroit. Matilda (also known as Maud or Maude), a descendant of the Livingston and the Schuyler family, was the daughter of Mary (née L'Hommedieu) Ledyard and Henry Brockholst Ledyard Jr., president of the Michigan Central Railroad and the Union Trust Company. Her paternal grandfather was Henry Ledyard, a former mayor of Detroit, and her uncle, Lewis Cass Ledyard, was the personal lawyer of J. Pierpont Morgan.

After returning to her family in America after his death, his widow, who never remarried, later lived at a villa in Florence, Italy, before leaving shortly before World War II. In 1942, she gave several pieces of art to the University of Michigan Museum of Art. In 1938, she bought a 90-acre estate in Canaan, Connecticut where she died in 1960.

== Commemoration ==
After China's loss to the Eight-Nation Alliance in 1901, treaties were signed between China and eleven nations (the Eight Nations plus Spain, Belgium and the Netherlands). Prince Chun, father of the last emperor Puyi, travelled to Germany in his official capacity as ambassador extraordinary to express the regrets of the Guangxu Emperor over the death of Ketteler to Kaiser Wilhelm II. A paifang or "memorial gate" called the Ketteler Memorial (German: Ketteler-Denkmal, Chinese: 克林德碑) was erected at the location where he fell, as an appeasement to the Eight-Nation Alliance. Work on this gate began on 25 June 1901 and was completed on 8 January 1903.

On 13 November 1918, two days after Germany signed an armistice with the Allies, the Ketteler Memorial was officially abolished. The following year, the gate was moved to the present-day Zhongshan Park and renamed "The Victory of Justice Gate" (Chinese: 公理戰勝牌坊). In 1953, on the occasion of the Asia-Pacific Peace Conference in Beijing, it was renamed once again as "The Protection of Peace Gate".
