= Oliver Moulton Hyde =

American politician

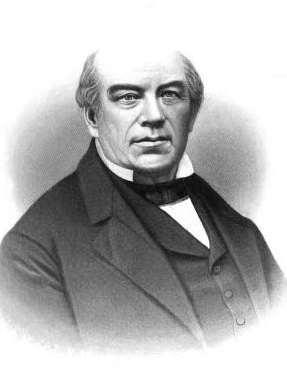

Mayor of Detroit
- In office 1854–1854
- Preceded by: John H. Harmon
- Succeeded by: Henry Ledyard

Mayor of Detroit
- In office 1856–1857
- Preceded by: Henry Ledyard
- Succeeded by: John Patton

Personal details
- Born: March 10, 1804 Sudbury, Vermont
- Died: June 28, 1870 (aged 66) Detroit, Michigan
- Spouse: Julia Ann Sprague

Oliver Moulton Hyde (March 10, 1804 – June 28, 1870) was a Detroit businessman, manufacturer, and politician who was elected mayor of Detroit three times, in 1854, 1856, and 1857.

== Biography ==
Oliver Moulton Hyde was born in Sudbury, Vermont on March 10, 1804, the son of Pitt William Hyde. At age 23, Hyde married Julia Ann Sprague, and opened a dry goods store in Castleton, Vermont. In 1834, he sold the store and moved to Mount Hope, New York to manage two blast furnaces.

In 1838, Hyde moved to Detroit and opened a hardware store on Woodward Avenue. He began a business manufacturing counter scales at the same location. Hyde branched out in business, opening a foundry and machine shop, and began manufacturing marine engines and other steamboat hardware. In 1852, he began a dry dock business, and also built a sawmill near Saginaw, Michigan.

He had a reputation for extensive charity work, and gave or privately loaned a substantial portion of his fortune.

Hyde joined the Whig Party and ran for multiple elected offices; later in life he joined the Republican Party. Hyde was elected to the city council numerous times, and served as mayor of Detroit in 1854, 1856, and 1857. He was also appointed Collector for the Port of Detroit under presidents Zachary Taylor and Millard Fillmore.

In 1863, Hyde suffered a debilitating stroke, after which he was almost completely confined to his house. A second stroke followed four years later. Nevertheless, Hyde actively supported recruiting and public service during the Civil War.

Oliver Moulton Hyde died on June 28, 1870. He had three living children: Henry S. Hyde, Hattie S. Hyde, and Louis C. Hyde.

Political offices
Preceded by John H. Harmon	Mayor of Detroit; 1854	Succeeded by Henry Ledyard
Preceded by Henry Ledyard	Mayor of Detroit; 1856–1857	Succeeded by John Patton
