= 1848 Democratic National Convention =

U.S. political event held in Baltimore, Maryland

- 1848 presidential election
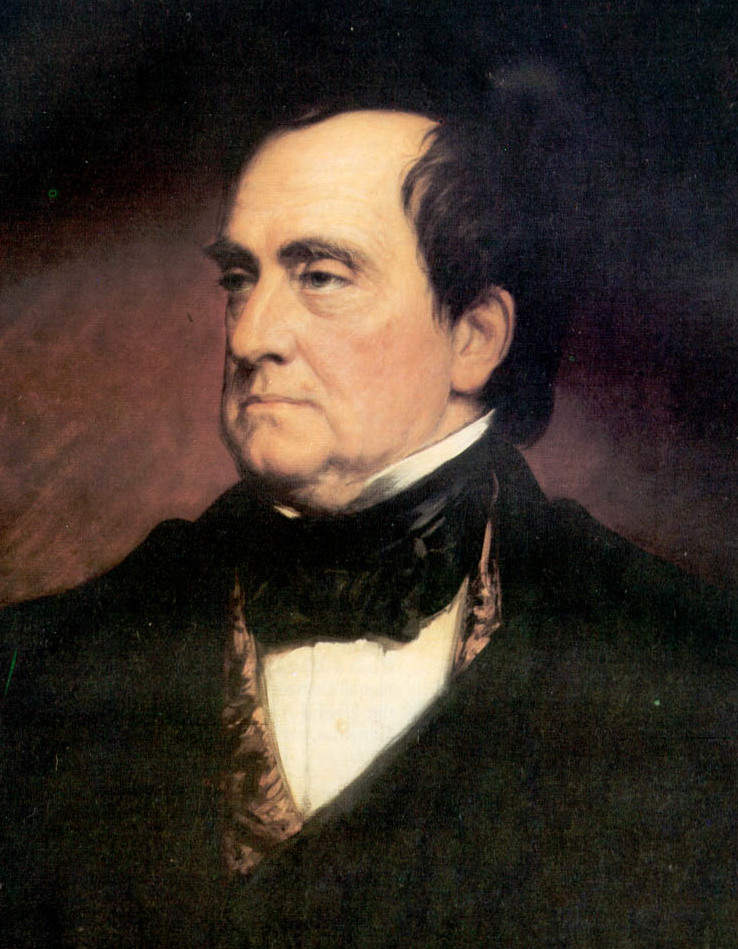
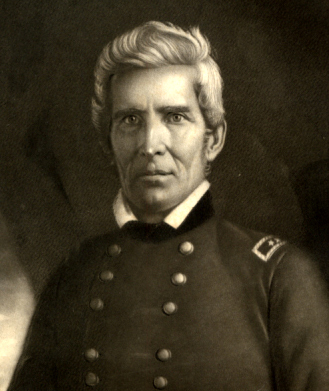
- Nominees; Cass and Butler

Convention
- Dates: May 22–26, 1848
- City: Baltimore, Maryland
- Venue: Universalist Church

Candidates
- Presidential nominee: Lewis Cass of Michigan
- Vice-presidential nominee: William O. Butler of Kentucky

The 1848 Democratic National Convention was a presidential nominating convention that met from Monday May 22 to Friday May 26 in Baltimore, Maryland. It was held to nominate the Democratic Party's candidates for President and Vice President in the 1848 election. The convention selected Senator Lewis Cass of Michigan for President and former Representative William O. Butler of Kentucky for Vice President.

As incumbent Democratic president James K. Polk declined to seek re-election, the Democratic Party nominated a new presidential candidate for the 1848 election. The major competitors for the presidential nomination were Cass, Secretary of State James Buchanan of Pennsylvania, and Supreme Court justice Levi Woodbury of New Hampshire. Cass led on the first presidential ballot, and he continued to gain delegates until he clinched the nomination on the fourth ballot. Butler won the vice presidential nomination on the second ballot, defeating former governor John A. Quitman of Mississippi and several other candidates. The Democratic ticket was defeated in the 1848 election by the Whig ticket of Zachary Taylor and Millard Fillmore.

== Proceedings ==
Former speaker of the House Andrew Stevenson of Virginia was made the president (chair) of the convention.

After readopting the two-thirds rule for selecting the nominee, the assembly turned to the thorny problem of competing delegations representing different factions of the New York party. The convention adopted a compromise (by a vote of 133 to 118) of splitting the thirty-six votes between the pro-Van Buren faction and the Hunkers that opposed them: Van Buren and the Barnburners promptly walked out of the convention, while the Hunkers cast blank ballots throughout.

The Democratic National Committee was established at this convention.

== Presidential nomination ==
=== Presidential candidates ===
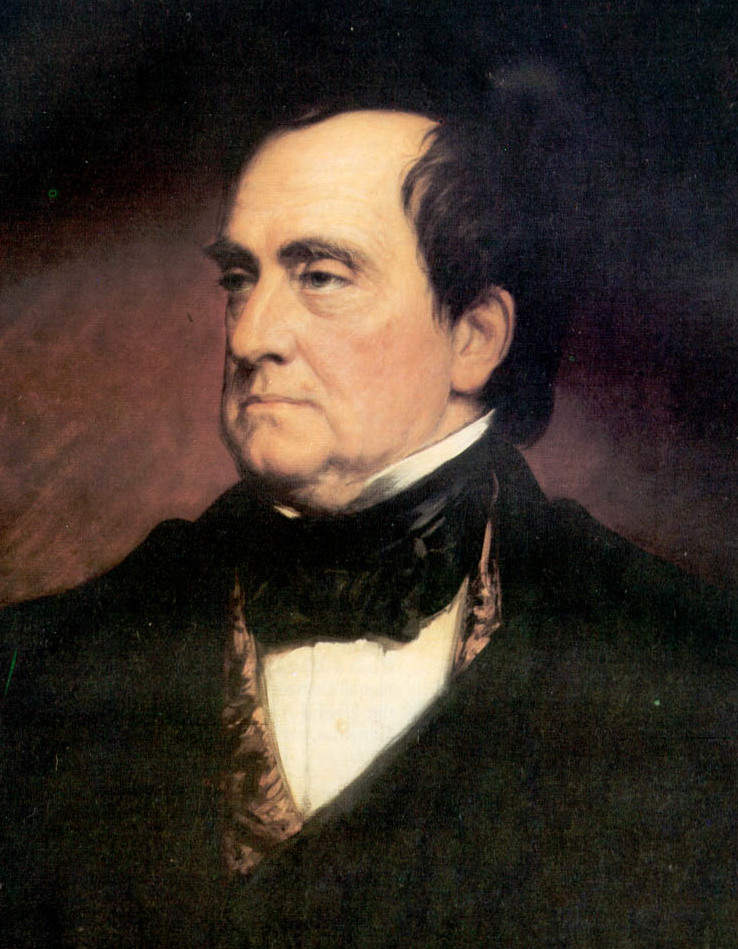
Senator
Lewis Cass
of Michigan

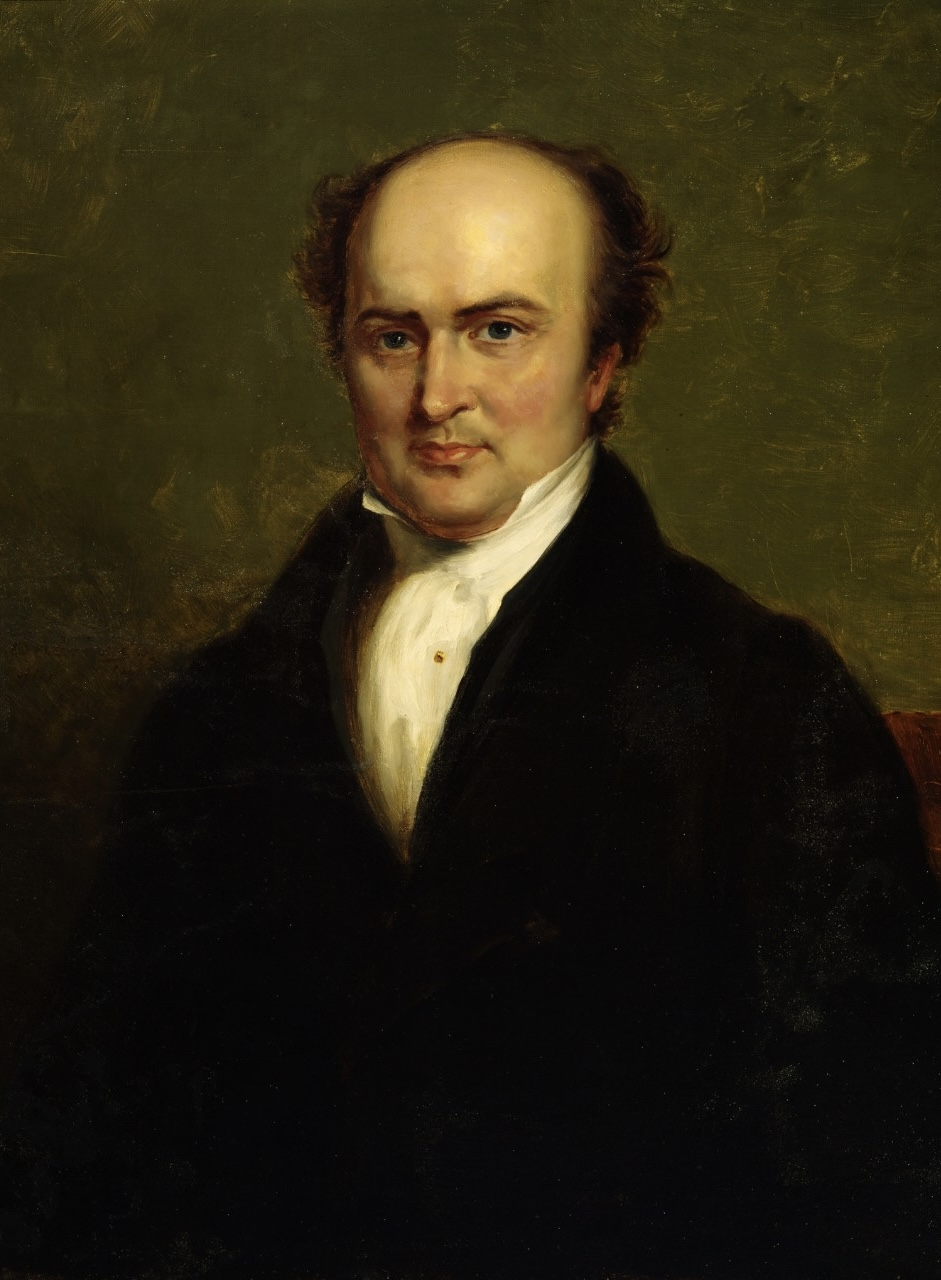
Associate Justice
Levi Woodbury
of New Hampshire

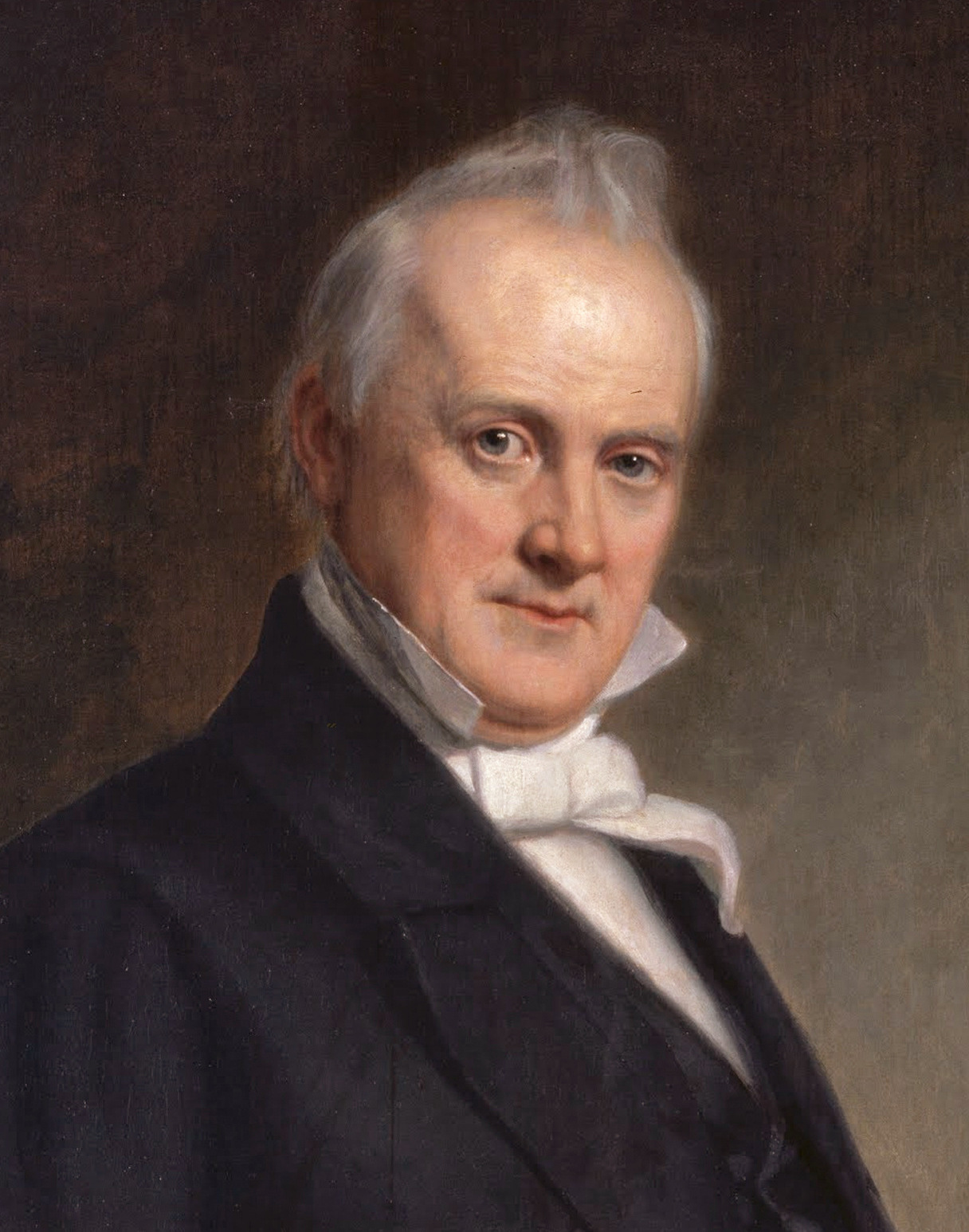
Secretary of State
James Buchanan
of Pennsylvania

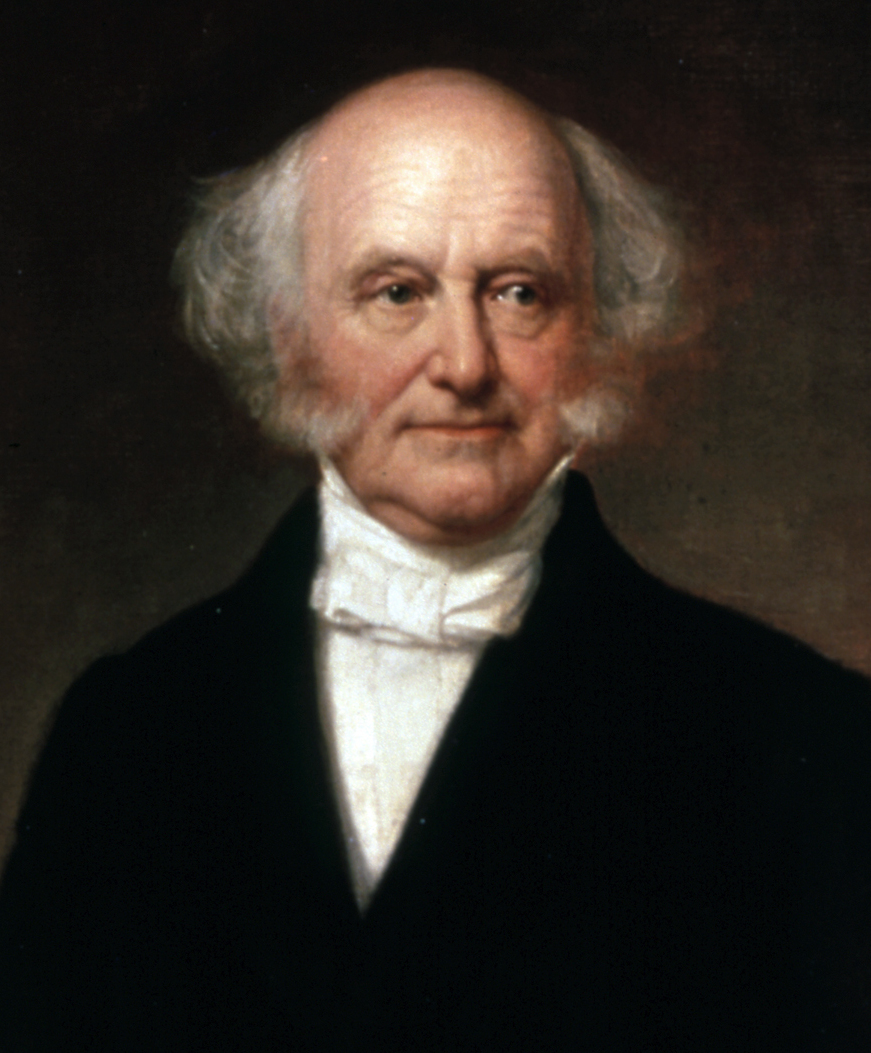
Former President
Martin Van Buren
of New York
(withdrew before first ballot)

=== Declined ===
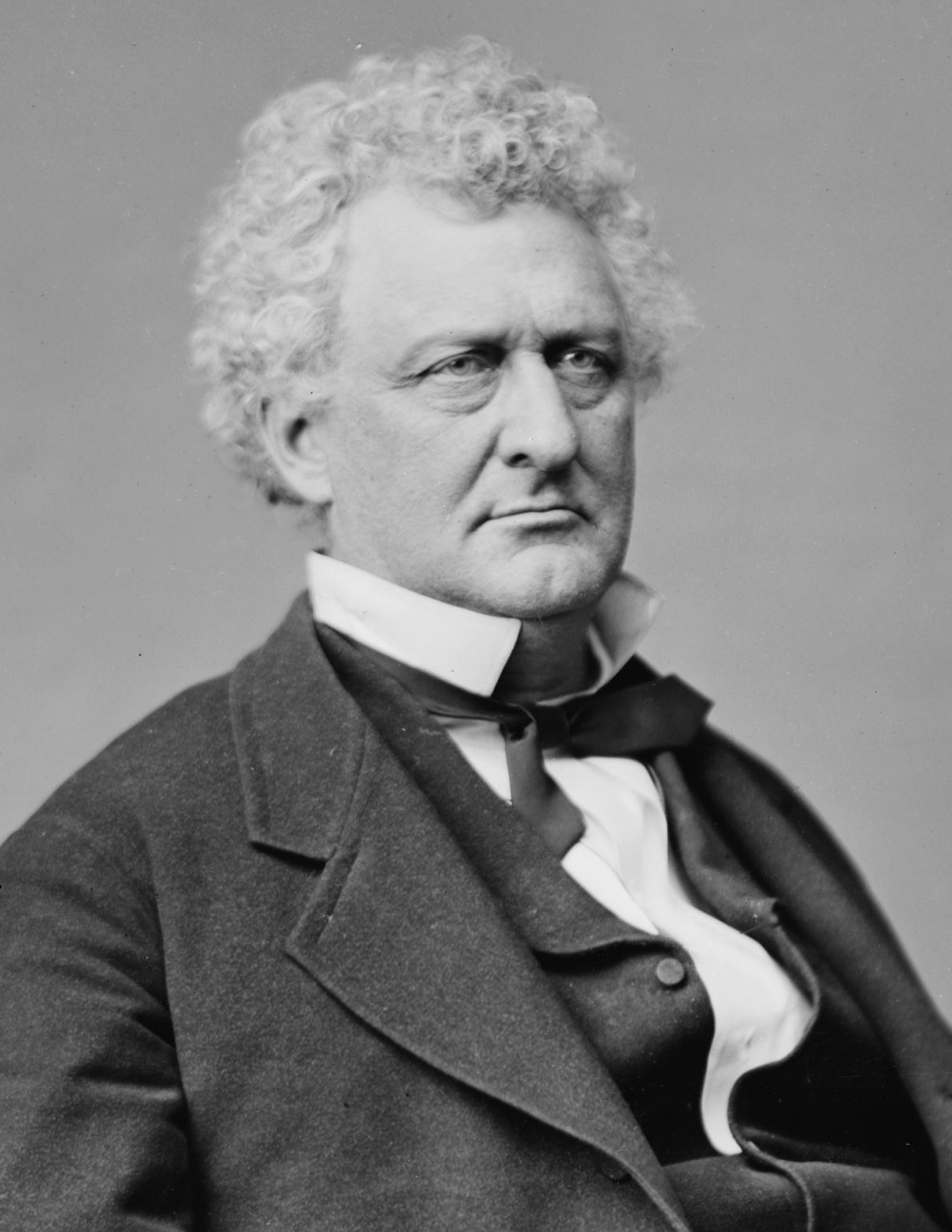
Senator
William Allen
of Ohio
(Endorsed Cass)

The main competitors for the nomination were Senator Lewis Cass of Michigan, Secretary of State James Buchanan from Pennsylvania, and Supreme Court Justice Levi Woodbury from New Hampshire. Former President Martin Van Buren also desired to become the Democratic Party's candidate in the 1848 election. Some party leaders asked William Allen to enter the contest as a compromise candidate, but he refused to run for the presidency. Instead, Allen chose to support Cass over Van Buren due to the two men's mutual support of popular sovereignty.

Van Buren withdrew before balloting began due to a dispute over the seating of the New York delegation that culminated in the convention voting that half of the state's delegates be made up of the anti-slavery "Barnburner" faction, led by Van Buren, with the remaining half from the pro-slavery "Hunker" faction.

Van Buren, knowing he had no feasible path to winning the nomination without the full support of the New York delegation, promptly led the Barnburners in walking out of the convention. Bitter and aging, Van Buren did not care despite the fact that his life had been built upon the rock of party solidarity and party regularity. He loathed Lewis Cass and the principle of popular sovereignty with equal intensity. After it was further ruled the Hunkers would not be allowed to take the vacated seats of their absent Barnburner counterparts, they cast blank ballots during the voting.

On the first ballot, Cass had a large lead with 125 of the 254 delegate votes cast, with Buchanan and Woodbury receiving 55 and 53 votes respectively. On the next two ballots Cass gained a simple majority, while Woodbury's total was steady and Buchanan's began to fall. After Cass received 179 votes out of 254 on the fourth ballot, the chair declared that Cass had reached the required 170 votes and was therefore nominated.

Presidential Ballot
	1st	2nd	3rd	4th
Cass	125	133	156	179
Woodbury	53	56	53	38
Buchanan	55	54	40	33
Calhoun	9	0	0	0
Worth	6	5	5	1
Dallas	3	3	0	0
Butler	0	0	0	3
Not Voting	21	21	18	18
Not Represented	18	18	18	18

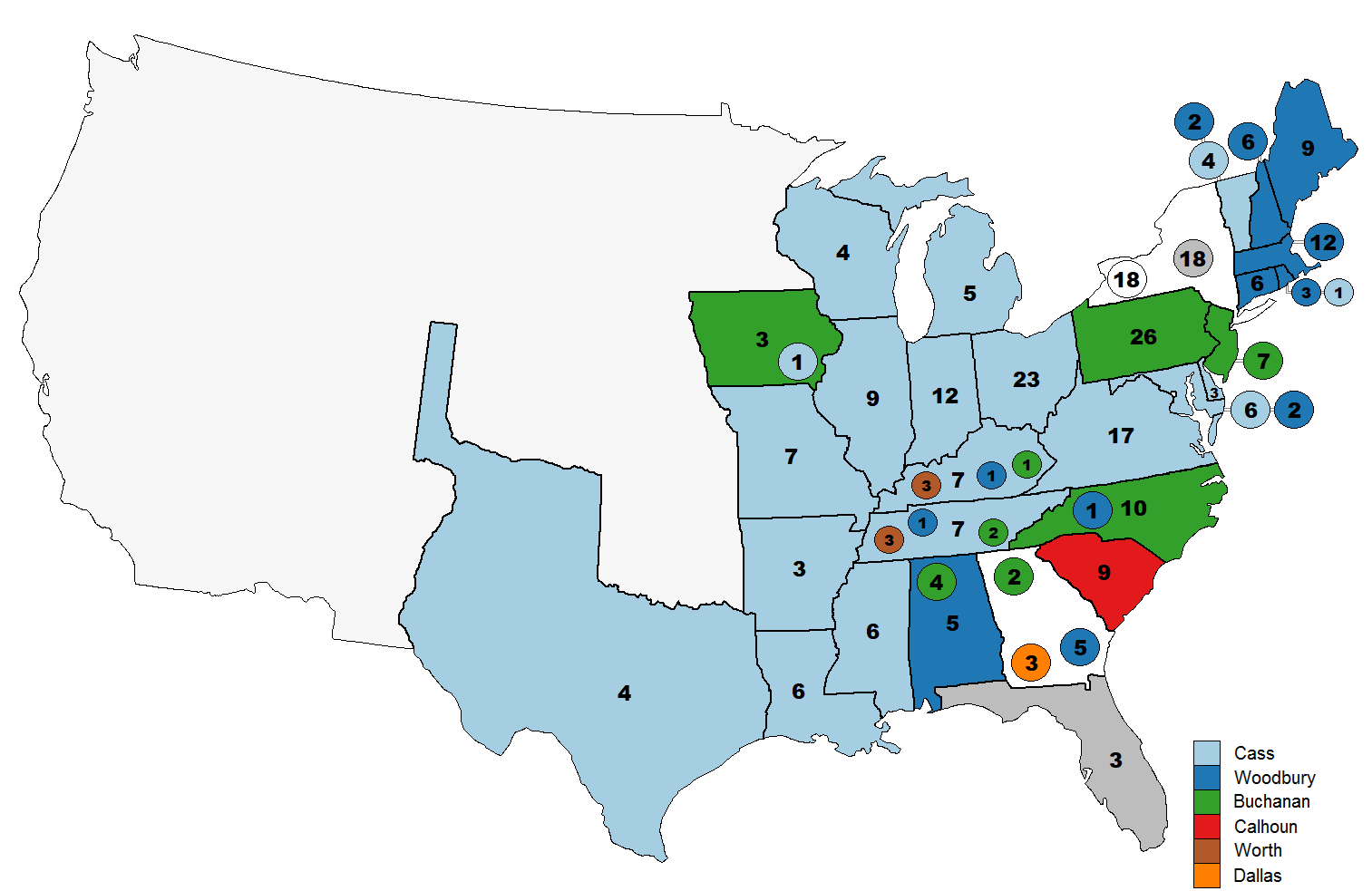
1st Presidential Ballot

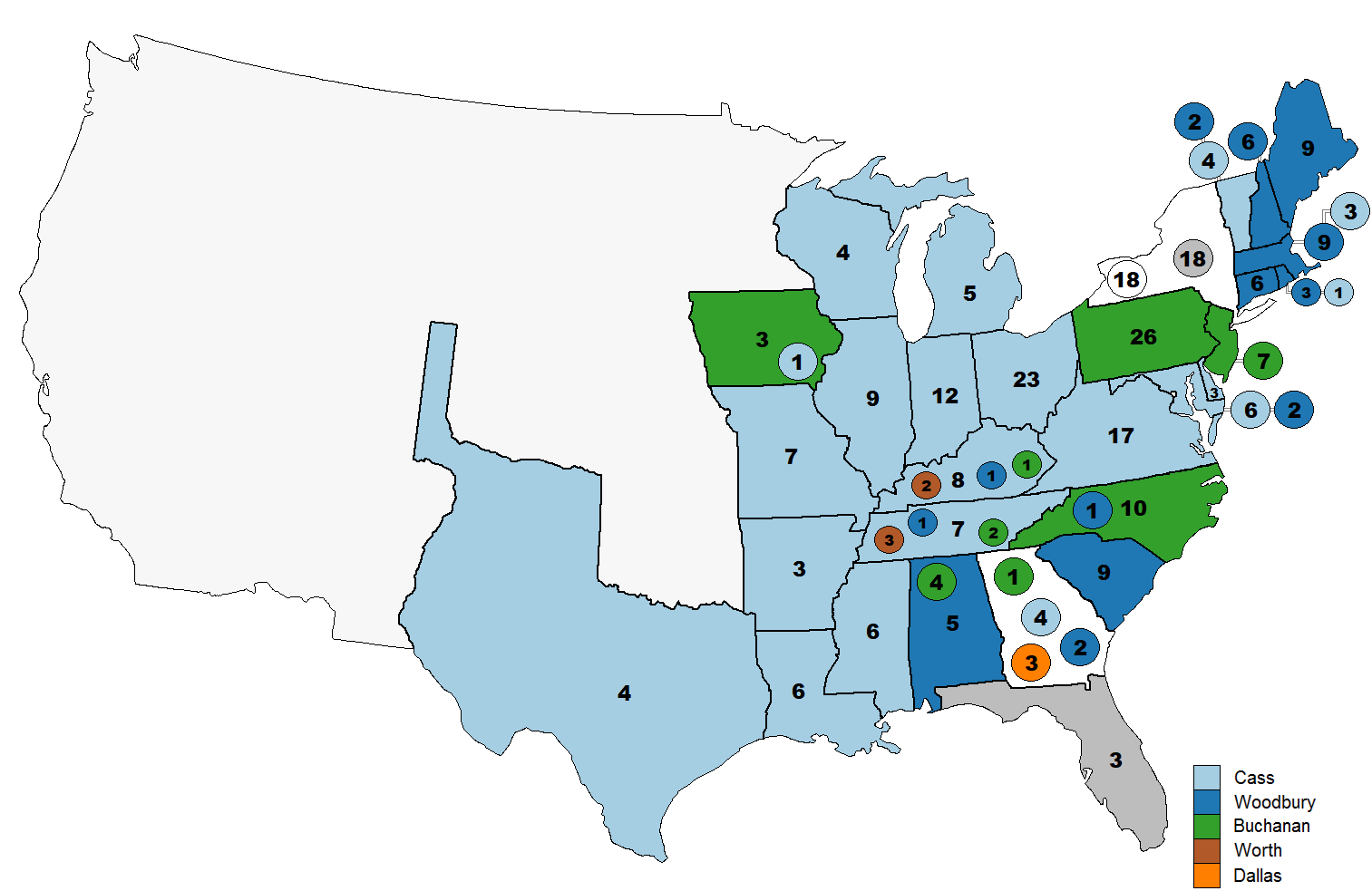
2nd Presidential Ballot

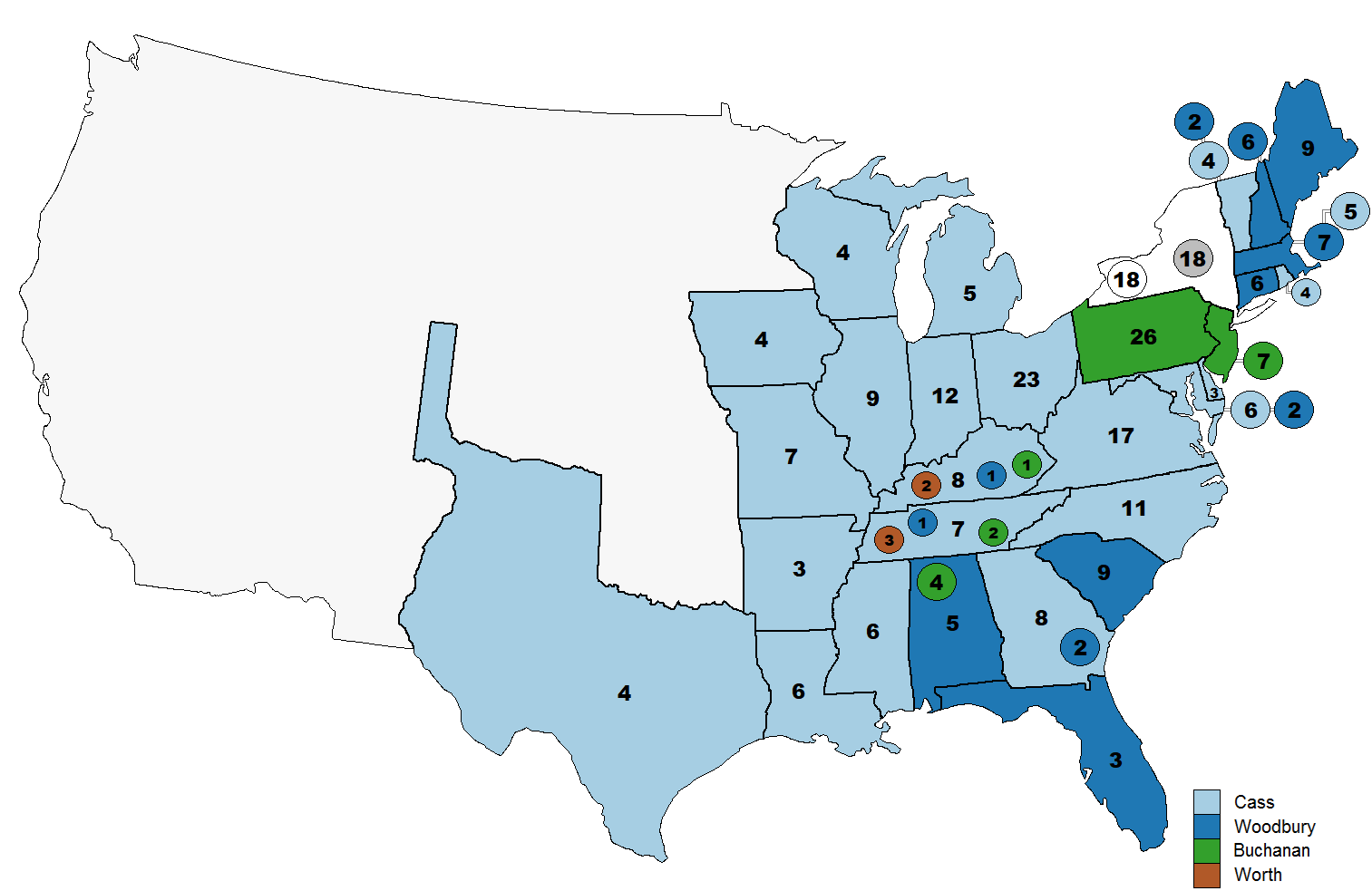
3rd Presidential Ballot

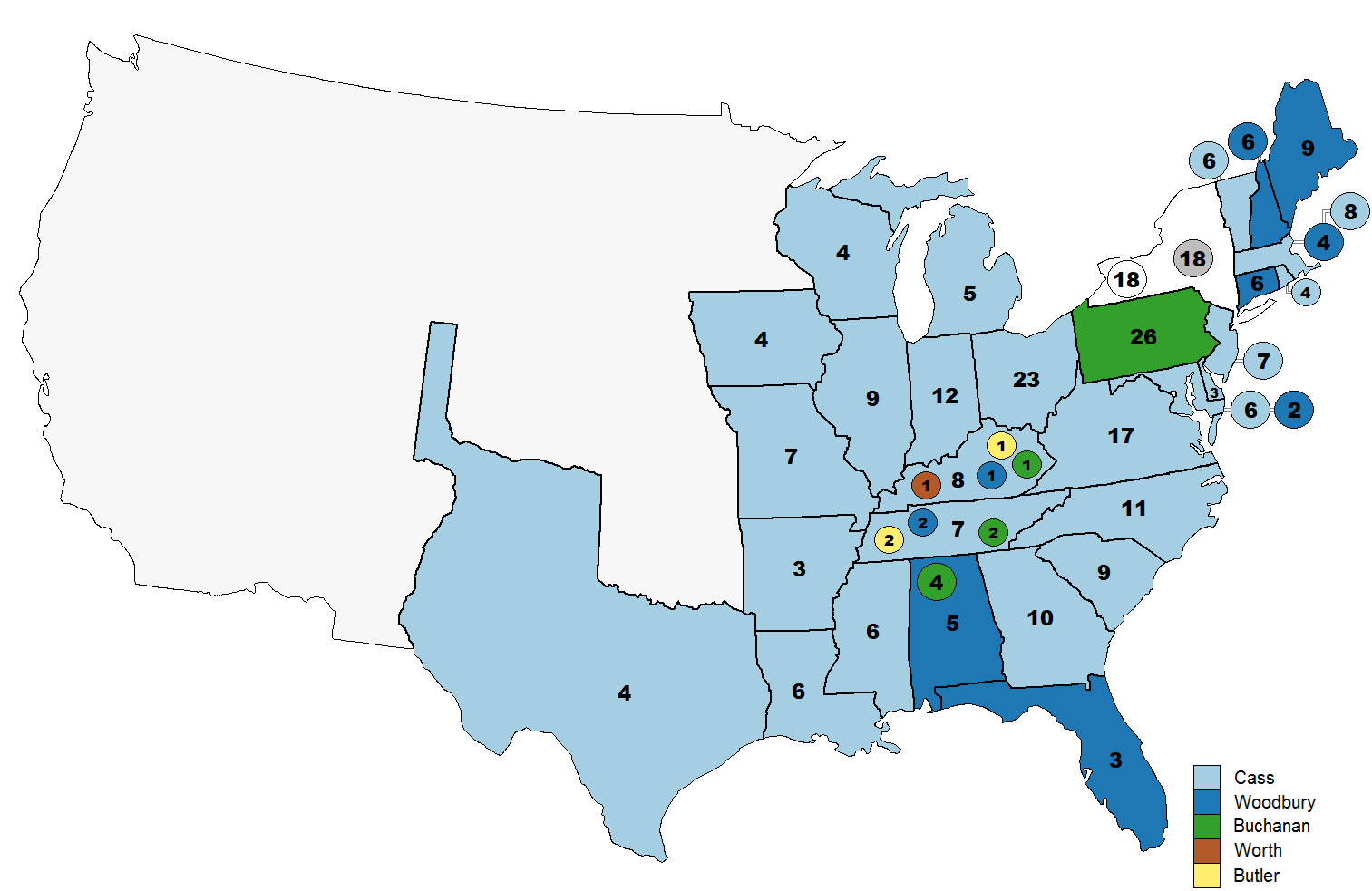
4th Presidential Ballot

== Vice Presidential nomination ==
=== Vice Presidential candidates ===
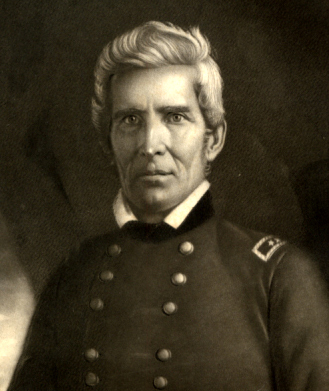
Former Representative
William O. Butler
of Kentucky

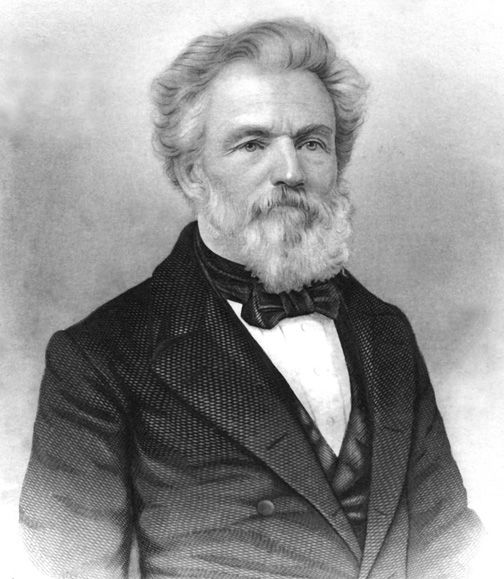
Former Governor
John A. Quitman
of Mississippi

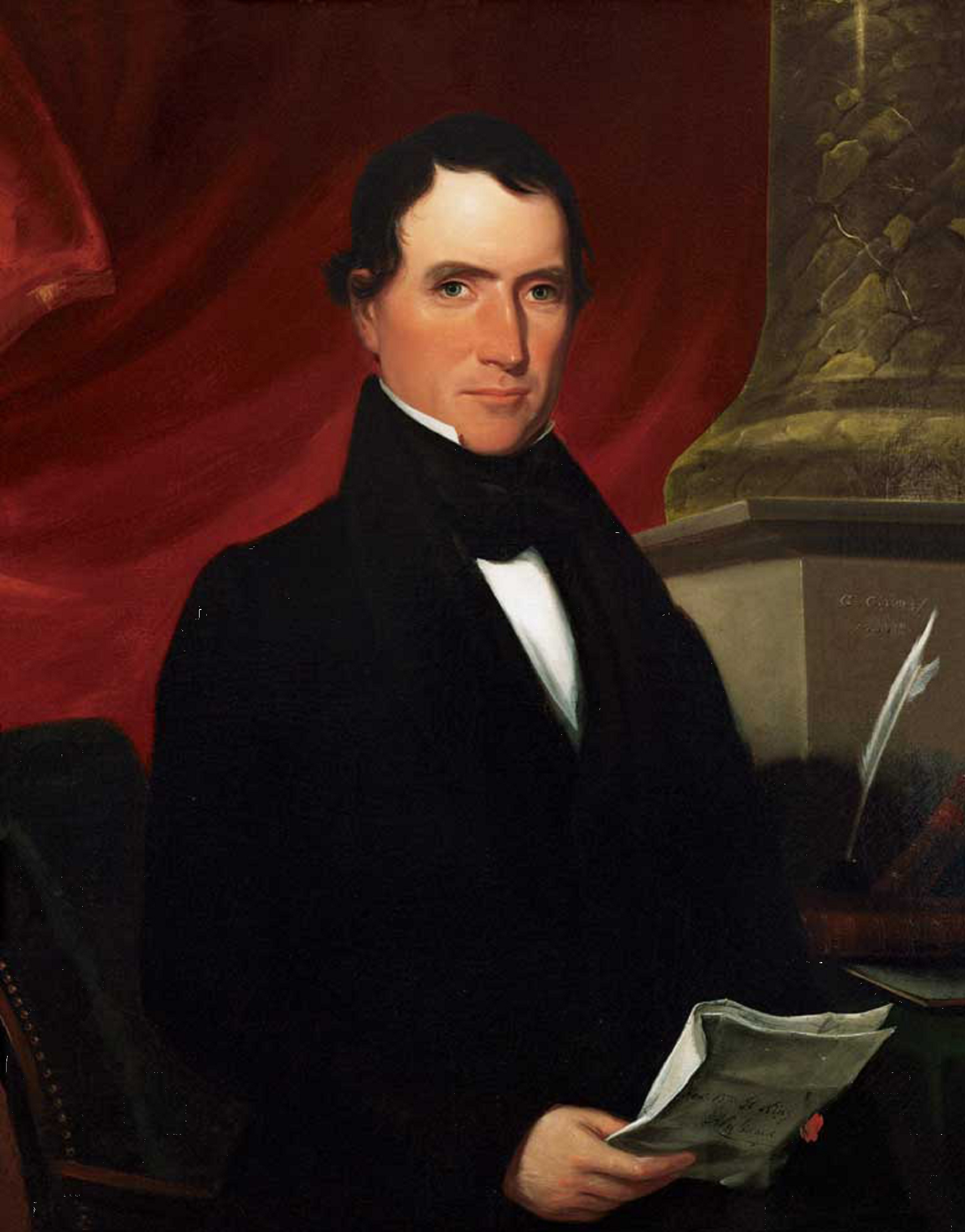
Former Senator
William R. King
of Alabama

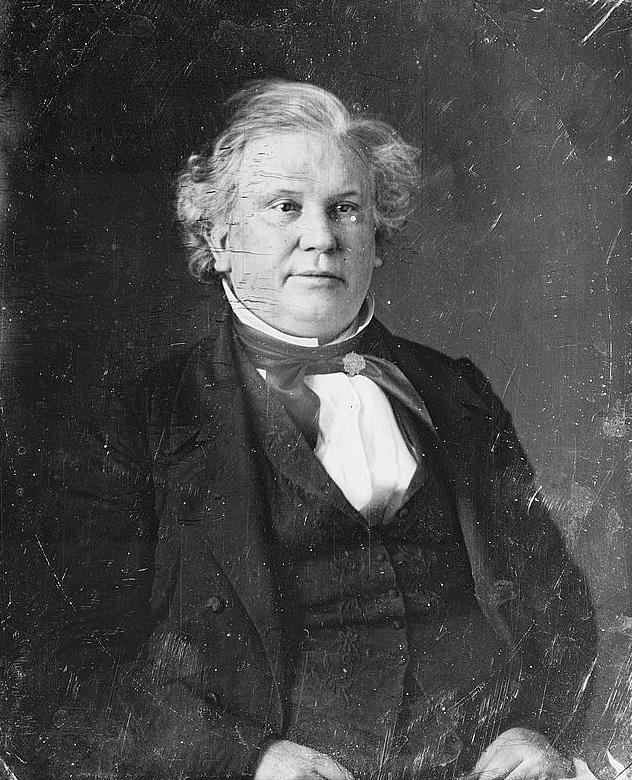
Secretary of the Navy
John Y. Mason
of Virginia

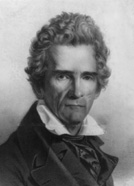
Representative
James Iver McKay
of North Carolina

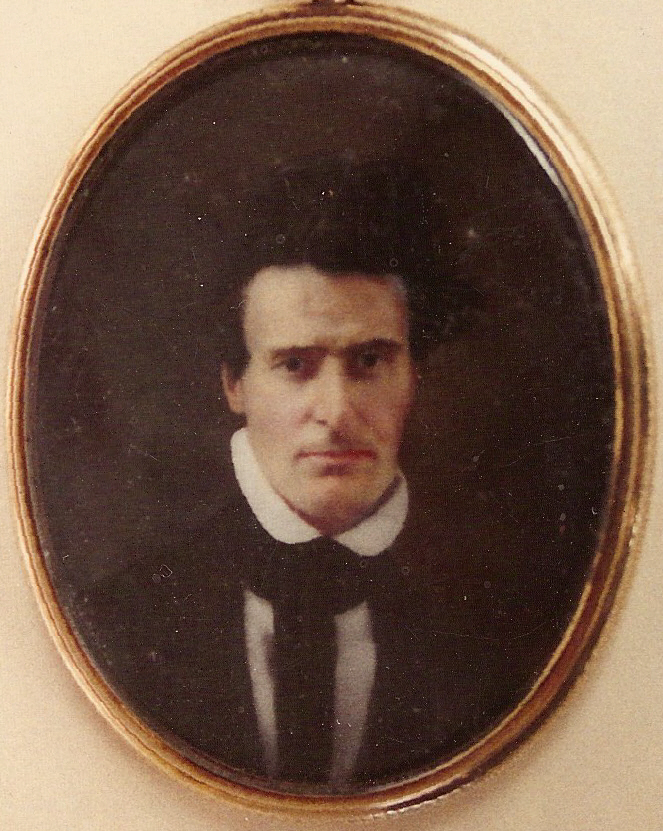
Inspector General of the Tennessee Militia
Levin Hudson Coe
of Tennessee

=== Declined ===
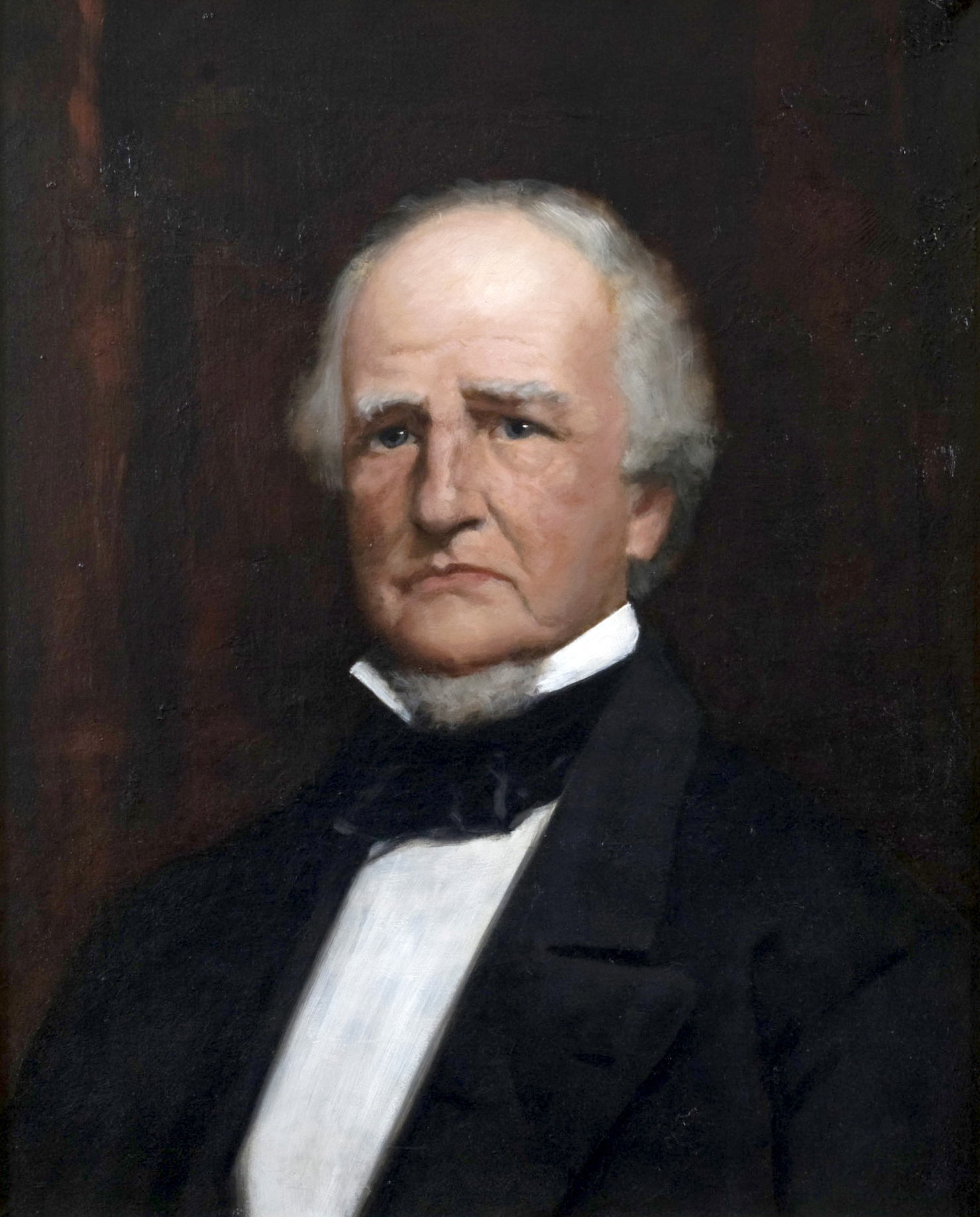
Reporter of Decisions
Benjamin Howard
of Maryland

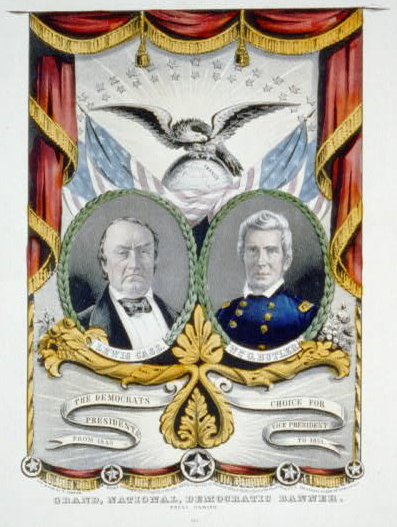
Cass/Butler campaign poster

Turning to the choice of a vice presidential running mate, the convention picked General William O. Butler of Kentucky over General John A. Quitman of Mississippi, former Senator and Minister to France William R. King of Alabama, Secretary of the Navy John Y. Mason of Virginia, and Representative James Iver McKay of North Carolina. Before it adjourned on May 25, this convention also appointed the first Democratic National Committee.

Vice Presidential Ballot
	1st	2nd (Before Shifts)	2nd (After Shifts)
Butler	114	170	254
Quitman	74	61	0
King	26	9	0
Mason	24	3	0
McKay	13	11	0
Davis	1	0	0
Not Voting	20	18	18
Not Represented	18	18	18

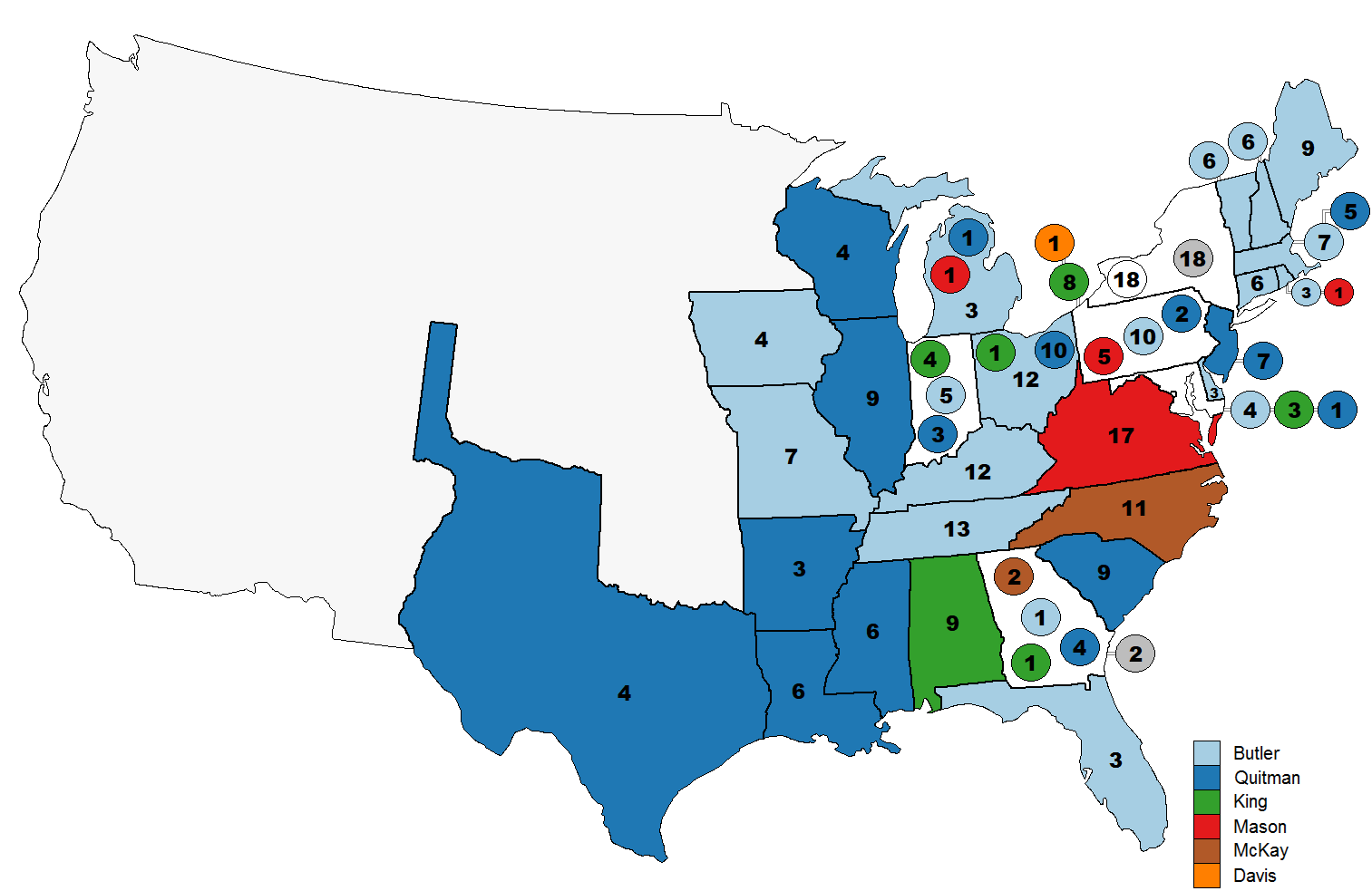
1st Vice Presidential Ballot

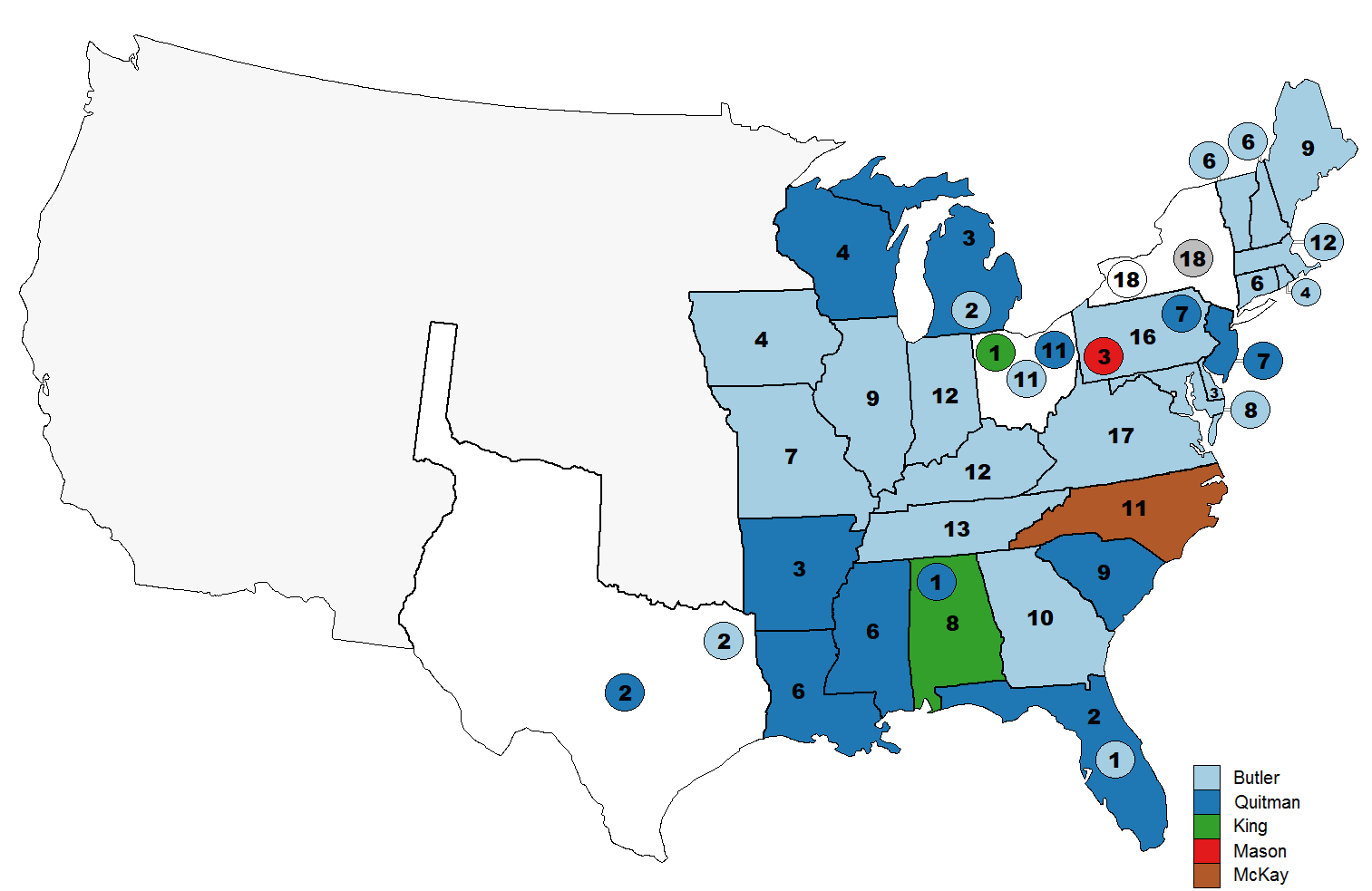
2nd Vice Presidential Ballot Before Shifts

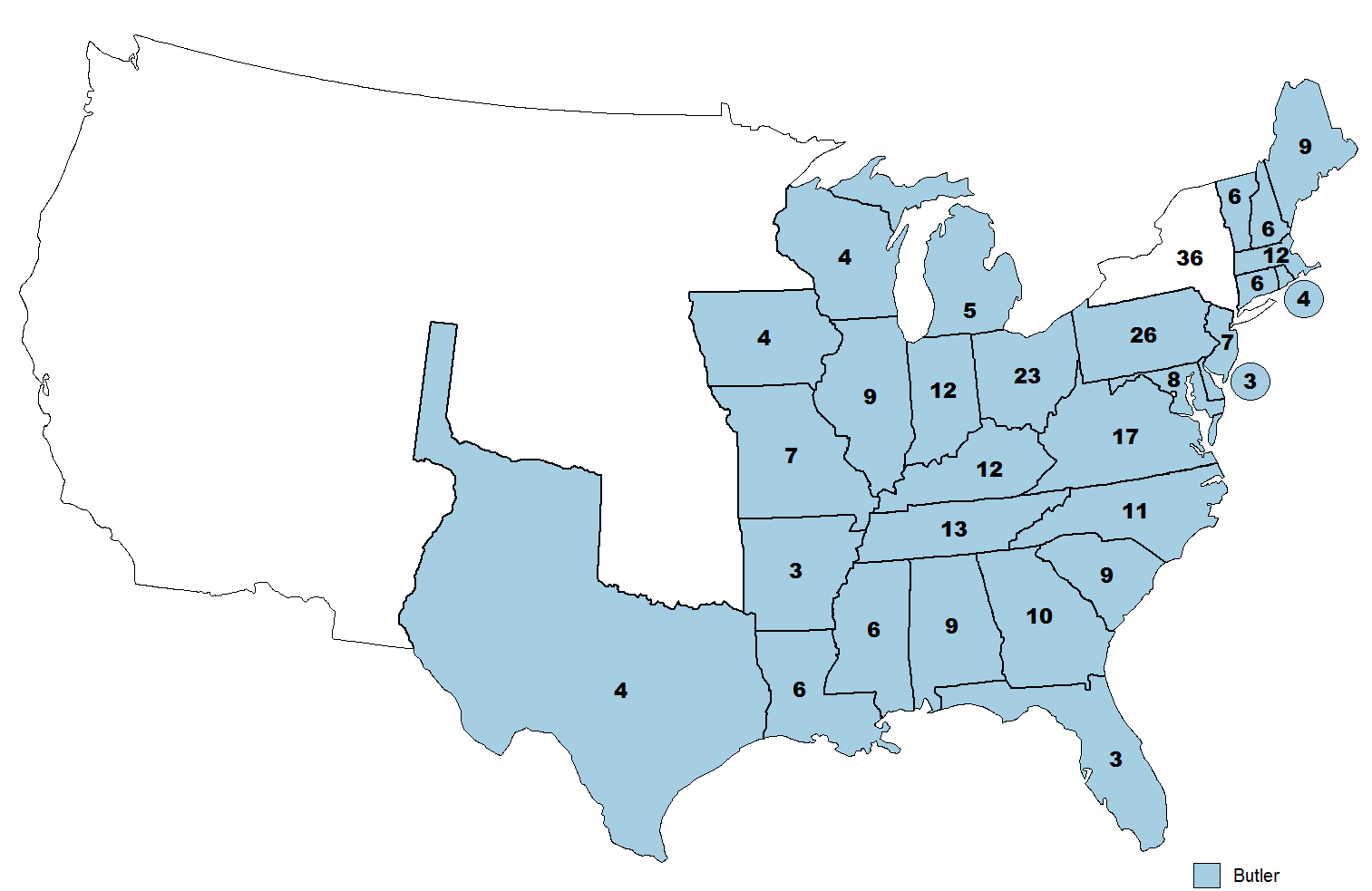
2nd Vice Presidential Ballot After Shifts

== See also ==
- History of the Democratic Party (United States)
- 1848 Whig National Convention
- List of Democratic National Conventions
- U.S. presidential nomination convention
- 1848 United States presidential election

Preceded by 1844; Baltimore, Maryland	Democratic National Conventions (List); 1848	Succeeded by 1852; Baltimore, Maryland
