= John H. Harmon =

American politician (1819–1888)

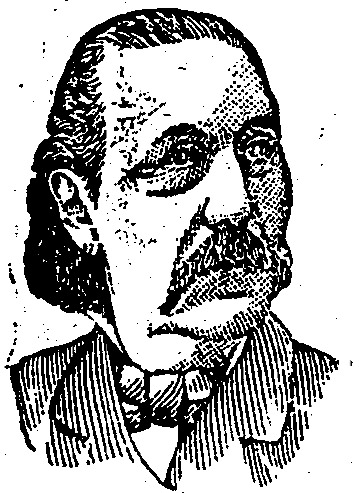

Mayor of Detroit
- In office 1852–1853
- Preceded by: Zachariah Chandler
- Succeeded by: Oliver Moulton Hyde

Personal details
- Born: June 21, 1819 Portage County, Ohio
- Died: August 6, 1888 (aged 69) Detroit, Michigan
- Spouse: Sarah S. Rood

John Hanchett Harmon (June 21, 1819 – August 6, 1888) was an American politician who was a member of the Democratic National Committee, the mayor of Detroit, and the publisher of the Detroit Free Press.

== Early life ==
John H. Harmon was born in Portage County, Ohio, on June 21, 1819. His father, John Harmon, was a printer and published a newspaper in Ravenna, Ohio. The younger Harmon joined his father and learned the printer's trade. In 1838, the younger Harmon travelled to Detroit as the aide-de-camp of "General" Lucius V. Bierce, a leader of the Hunter Patriots, a group dedicated to ridding North America of the British Empire. In December 1838, Harmon took part in the Battle of Windsor, personally burning the British barracks and the steamer Thames.

After the Battle of Windsor, Harmon stayed in Detroit, obtaining a job at the Detroit Free Press. He became an editor and one-third owner of the paper in 1841, and in 1853 sole owner of the paper. Harmon sold the Free Press the next year.

In 1841, Harmon married Sarah S. Rood. The couple had three children: John Harmon, Emma Harmon, and Mrs. S. H. Bell.

== Politics ==
Harmon was a prominent Democrat, serving as an alderman of the city of Detroit in 1847 and two years as mayor, in 1852 and 1853, as well as representing Michigan on the 1848 Democratic National Committee. He was also a member of the state militia, being appointed a Colonel in 1850. Following his stint as mayor, he was appointed by President Franklin Pierce as Collector for the Port of Detroit, where he served until 1857. After he left the office of Collector, Harmon spent much of his time in Washington, D.C., during congressional sessions.

During this time Harmon, as one biographer put it, "became a victim to the bad habits created by the customs of hospitality then existing in Detroit." Through generosity to his friends, his fortune declined, and Harmon spent some time again working for the Free Press. However, he later "conquered [his] habit" and became a total abstainer, a "silent but eloquent example of a permanently reformed man." John H. Harmon died August 6, 1888, in a hotel in Detroit.

Political offices
Preceded by Zachariah Chandler	Mayor of Detroit; 1852–1853	Succeeded by Oliver Moulton Hyde
