= 1848 Democratic National Committee =

DEMOCRATIC PARTY'S FIRST NATIONAL ORGANISATION

1848 Democratic National Committee was the Democratic Party's first continuing national organization with one member from each state appointed for four years at the 1848 nominating convention in Baltimore.

State	Member	Note
Maine	Charles Andrews (1814–1852)	elected House of Representatives 1850
New Hampshire	Richard Jenness (1802–1872)	President N.H. Senate 1850
Vermont	Horace Clark	defeated Lieutenant Governor 1850
Massachusetts	Benjamin F. Hallett (1797–1861)	defeated House of Representatives 1848
Rhode Island	Walter S. Burges (1808–1892)	U.S. District Attorney 1845–49
Connecticut	Charles A. Ingersoll (1798–1860)	U.S. District Court Judge 1853–60
New York	Edwin Croswell (1797–1871)	editor Albany Argus
New Jersey	Edwin R. V. Wright (1812–1871)	defeated Governor 1859
Pennsylvania	John W. Forney (1817–1881)	Clerk House of Representatives 1851–56
Delaware	George R. Riddle (1817–1867)	elected House of Representatives 1850
Maryland	Albert Constable (1805–1855)	House of Representatives 1845–47
Virginia	William F. Ritchie ( –1877)	editor Richmond Enquirer
North Carolina	Robert Strange (1796–1854)	U.S. Senator 1836–40
South Carolina	J.M.Commander	
Georgia	M. H. McAllister	Mayor of Savannah 1837–39
Alabama	Patrick E. Britten	
Mississippi	John Duncan	
Louisiana	Emile La Sére (1802–1882)	House of Representatives 1846–51
Ohio	Samuel Medary (1801–1864)	editor Ohio Statesman
Kentucky	John W. Stevenson (1812–1886)	House of Representatives 1857–61
Indiana	Gilbert Hathaway	
Illinois	Murray McConnel (1798– )	Fifth Auditor of the U.S. Treasury 1855–59
Missouri	Samuel Treat (1815–1902)	U.S. District Court Judge 1857–87
Arkansas	Solon Borland (1808–1864)	U.S. Senator 1848–53
Michigan	John Harmon (1819–1888)	Mayor of Detroit 1852–54
Florida	James T. Archer (1819–1859)	Florida Secretary of State 1845–48
Texas	D. S. Kaufman (1813–1851)	House of Representatives 1846–51
Iowa	James Clarke (1812–1850)	Territorial Governor 1845–46
Wisconsin	Mason C. Darling (1801–1866)	House of Representatives 1848–49

B. F. Hallett was the Chairman and W. F. Ritchie was Secretary.
