= A.B. Hill =

American businessman

A.B. Hill (1838 – July 15, 1887) was an official of the New York Stock Exchange in the 19th century. He was born in London, England, but came to the United States as an infant after his father accepted a professorship at Oberlin College. Hill later graduated from Oberlin with honors.

== Career ==
He began his work career as a clerk in a St. Louis store, prior to leaving for Boston, Massachusetts, where he entered the brokerage business. He achieved success, building a large clientele, and was named a governor of the Boston Stock Exchange. In 1879 Hill came to New York City, where he purchased a seat on the New York Stock Exchange. He became an associate of the H.L. Horton Company which was located at 56 Broadway, in Manhattan. He was elected vice president of the NYSE and voted against an important measure which sought to whitewash the record of stock manipulator Henry S. Ives.

== Personal life ==
Hill was a bachelor, a member of the New York Club, and the Union League Club. He grew wealthy yet remained a man of modest tastes. He died suddenly of heart disease in 1887 after speaking at the rostrum of the New York Exchange. He had just announced the death of Manuel E. De Rivas, a Cuban who was a notable figure on Wall Street. Hill's funeral was in Boston.
