= John Patton (Detroit mayor) =

American politician

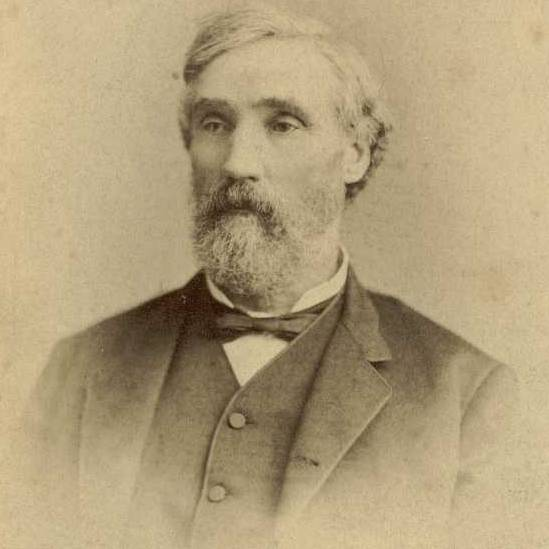

Mayor of Detroit
- In office 1859–1859
- Preceded by: Oliver Moulton Hyde
- Succeeded by: Christian H. Buhl

Personal details
- Born: March 1, 1822 County Down, Ireland
- Died: November 15, 1900 (aged 78) Detroit, Michigan
- Spouse: Eliza J. Anderson

John Patton (March 1, 1822 – November 15, 1900) was the mayor of Detroit, Michigan, in 1858–1859.

== Biography ==
John Patton was born March 1, 1822, in the county of County Down, Ireland, the son of James and Eliza Patton. In 1830, John and his father emigrated to Albany, New York, and were joined by the rest of the family the next year. At 17, John Patton was apprenticed as a carriagesmith, and in 1843 moved to Detroit, where he worked for others at his trade. Two years later, he went into business as a carriagemaker for himself. The fire of 1848 destroyed his factory, but Patton soon rebuilt, and his business prospered.

In 1845, Patton married Eliza J. Anderson. The couple had five children: William, Walter, Mrs. John McLean, Mrs. E. B. Gay, and John.

Patton rapidly became popular in the city, due in part to his "masterly" delivery of reading, thespian skills, and command of Scotch and Irish dialects. He served as chief engineer of the Fire Department in 1852–1854 and its president from 1855 to 1857. He was a Democrat in politics, and awas elected a city alderman in 1853–1854, mayor in 1858–1859, county auditor in 1864–1869, Wayne County, Michigan, sheriff in 1869–1870, Justice of the Peace from 1880– 1892 and United States consul at Amherstburg, Ontario, from 1893 to 1897.

John Patton died November 15, 1900.

Political offices
| Preceded by Oliver Moulton Hyde | Mayor of Detroit; 1858–1859 | Succeeded by Christian H. Buhl |
