= Samuel B. Hill (Ohio politician) =

American politician

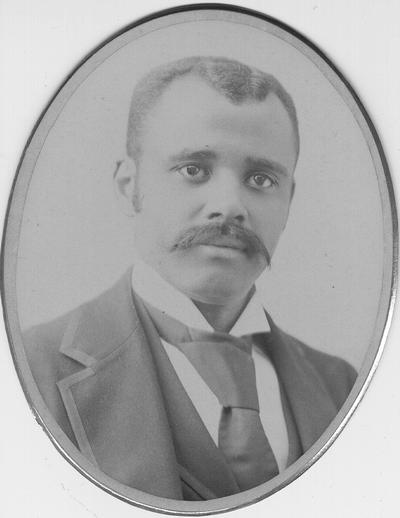
Samuel B. Hill

Samuel B. Hill (born 1862) was a teacher, school administrator and state legislator in Ohio. He was born in Xenia, Ohio. He was a Republican. He served in the Ohio House of Representatives in 1894 and 1895.

== See also ==
- African American officeholders from the end of the Civil War until before 1900
- List of African-American officeholders (1900–1959)
