= Henry S. Ives =

American financier and stock manipulator

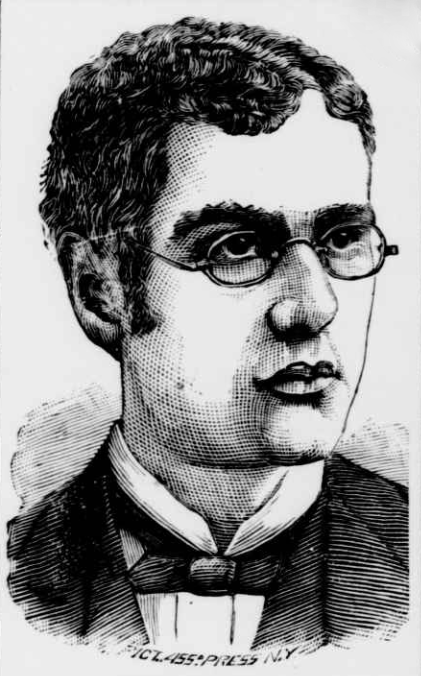
Associated Press engraving of Henry S. Ives from 1889

Henry S. Ives (1859–1894) was an American financier, speculator and stock manipulator, popularly nicknamed by the contemporary press as "The Napoleon of Finance." Ives is best remembered as the principal of a brief but spectacular Wall Street misappropriation of funds scandal in the 1880s.

== Biography ==
=== Early years ===
Ives was born in 1859 in Litchfield, Connecticut, the youngest of three children of a customs house broker.

He arrived penniless in New York City as a young man. "Baby-faced, slight of build, and short", he rose from a salary of $10 per week, to controlling millions of dollars of property, within five years.

=== Business career ===
With partners George H. Stayner and Thomas C. Doremus, he founded the firm of Henry S. Ives and Company in 1886, while still in his 20s. The firm immediately began acquiring the stocks of railroad companies, inflating their stock prices, which provided additional borrowing leverage for more acquisitions, then raiding their corporate treasuries once they'd assumed control. He controlled the Mineral Range Railroad in Michigan, the Terre Haute and Indianapolis, and his largest conquest was the Cincinnati, Hamilton and Dayton Railway in 1886.

In May 1887 the expulsion and later unexplained re-admission of Doremus as a member of the New York Stock Exchange caused a disruption in the NYSE's Board of Governors, including resignations within the governing committee.

=== Financial scandal ===
When Ives attempted a takeover of the venerable but troubled Baltimore and Ohio Railroad he provoked a legal and financial battle with its chief, Robert Garrett (son and successor of John W. Garrett). This triggered a collapse of the entire scheme on August 11, 1887. That announcement, at ten minutes before the close, caused unrestrained cheering on the NYSE trading floor. Ives's total liabilities amounted to $25,000,000. Creditors eventually settled for five cents on the dollar. Ives and Stayner were tried for grand larceny in September 1889 but acquitted on a hung jury.

=== Death and legacy ===
Ives died of tuberculosis in Asheville, North Carolina, on April 17, 1894, five years after the trial.
