= Henry B. Ledyard Jr. =

American railroad executive

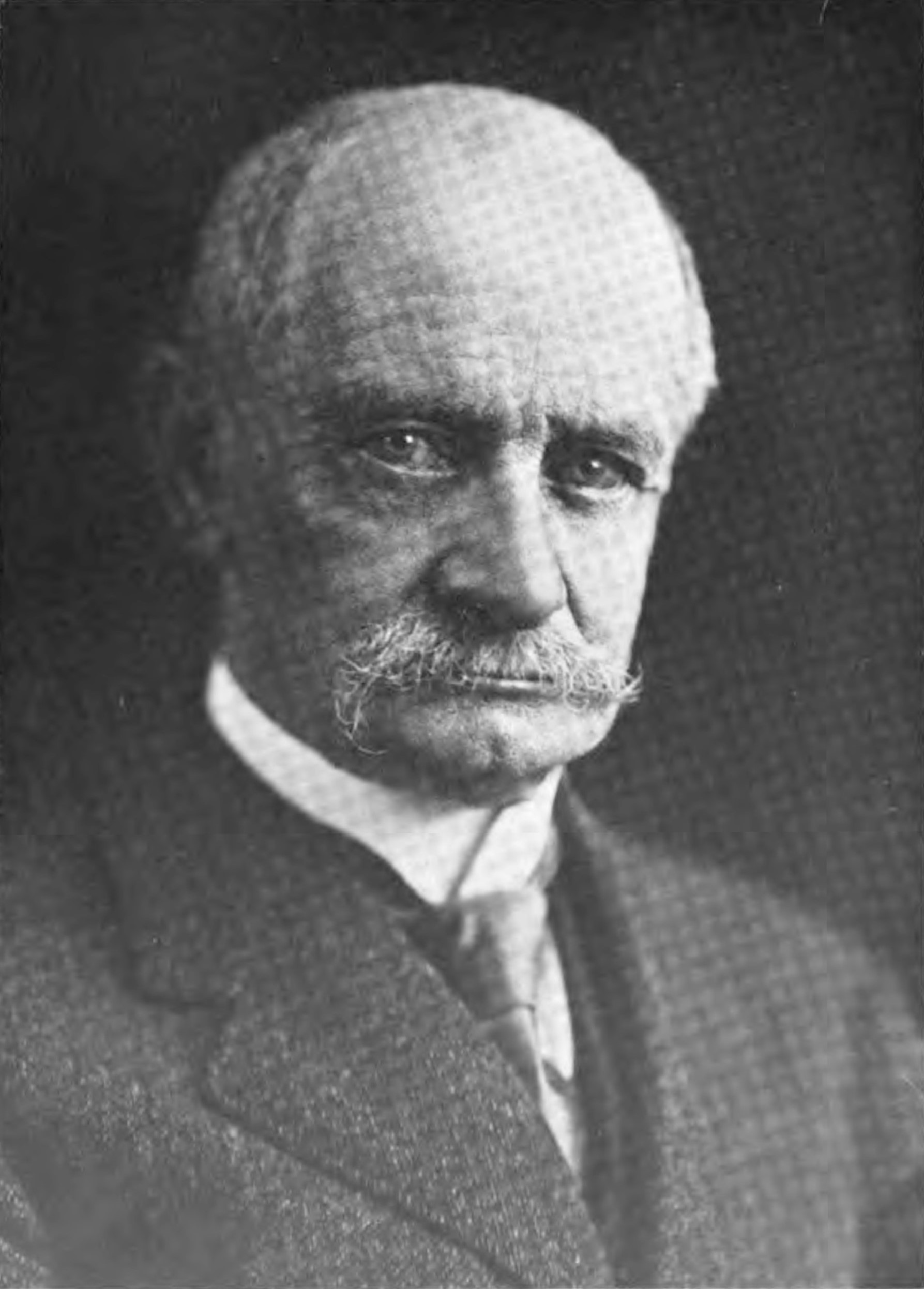

President of the Michigan Central Railroad
- In office 1883–1905
- Preceded by: William H. Vanderbilt
- Succeeded by: William H. Newman

Personal details
- Born: February 20, 1844 U.S. Embassy, Paris, France
- Died: May 25, 1921 (aged 77) Grosse Pointe Farms, Michigan, U.S.
- Spouse: Mary L'Hommedieu (m. 1867; died 1895)
- Parent(s): Henry Ledyard; Matilda Frances Cass
- Relatives: Lewis Cass (grandfather); Lewis Cass Ledyard (brother)
- Education: United States Military Academy

Henry Brockholst Ledyard Jr. (February 20, 1844 – May 25, 1921) was an American soldier and businessman who served as president of the Michigan Central Railroad and the Union Trust Company.

== Early life ==
Ledyard was born on February 20, 1844, at the American embassy in Paris to an established American family. He was one of five children born to Henry Brockholst Ledyard (1812–1880) and Matilda Frances (née Cass) (1808–1898). His father was a lawyer, diplomat, and mayor of Detroit. Ledyard had three sisters and a brother, Lewis Cass Ledyard, a lawyer with Carter Ledyard & Milburn who served as personal counsel to J. P. Morgan. At the time of his birth, his father was secretary of the American legation in Paris.

His paternal grandparents were Benjamin Ledyard, a prominent New York attorney, and Susan French (née Livingston) Ledyard. His grandmother was the daughter of Revolutionary War Col. and U.S. Supreme Court Justice Henry Brockholst Livingston and granddaughter of the first governor of New Jersey, William Livingston. His maternal grandfather, Gen. Lewis Cass, had been governor of the Michigan Territory and a United States senator from the state of Michigan, and served as secretary of state under President James Buchanan. His maternal grandmother, Elizabeth (née Spencer) Cass, was the granddaughter of Maj.-Gen. Joseph Spencer, who served in the American Revolution under George Washington. His aunt, Isabella Cass, married Theodorus Marinus Roest van Limburg, Baron van Limburg, the Dutch Minister of Foreign Affairs.

Ledyard was a student at the Washington A. Bacon's school for boys in Detroit before he was appointed as a cadet to the United States Military Academy at West Point by President Buchanan while his grandfather was serving as Secretary of State. He graduated in 1865, and among his classmates who later attained general officer rank were Charles W. Raymond, Alfred E. Bates, John Patten Story, George H. Burton, and Samuel Meyers Mills Jr.

== Career ==
Upon graduation in 1865, Ledyard was commissioned as a second lieutenant, and he was promoted to first lieutenant on the same day. He was then assigned to duty with the 19th Infantry, serving successively as Quartermaster, Brigade Quartermaster and Chief of the Commissary officers of the Department of Arkansas. He was later transferred to the 37th Infantry as Quartermaster and later to the 4th Artillery and was detailed Chief of Subsistence on the staff of General Winfield Scott Hancock of the Department of Missouri. After the Civil War, he was involved in battles with Native Americans in 1867 and, for a year, was Assistant Professor of French at West Point.

=== Railroad career ===
Following the reorganization of the U.S. Army in 1870, Ledyard obtained a six months leave to learn about railroads, becoming involved with the engineering department of the Northern Pacific Railroad. Later that same year, he became a clerk in the operating department of the Chicago, Burlington and Quincy Railroad, and resigned from the Army. Within two years, he was Assistant Superintendent of the Chicago, Burlington and Quincy and the following year was made Superintendent of the Eastern Division.

In 1874, Ledyard was appointed assistant to William Barstow Strong, the General Superintendent of the Michigan Central Railroad Company. The next year he was made Chief Engineer and Assistant General Superintendent. Two years later, he succeeded Strong as General Superintendent and the following year, he became General Manager of the road. After a few years of work turning the road into a success, the road was acquired by the Vanderbilt interests and William H. Vanderbilt became president of the company. Under Ledyard's supervision, the road smartly avoided issuing bonds and stockjobbing, and in 1883 he succeeded Vanderbilt as president of the Michigan Central. As president, he doubled the capacity of the railroad cars and had longer trains pulled by more powerful locomotives which reduced the cost of transportation. Ledyard had every steel railroad bridge in the eastern division torn down and rebuilt miles of trackage in an effort to eliminate curves and steep grades. After reconstruction, the company was operating eighty car freight trains versus the thirty before. He was relieved as general manager in 1903, but remained president of the road until 1905, when he resigned and became chairman of the board.

In 1916, Ledyard purchased the Detroit Belt Line Railroad which bordered many large factories, including the Ford Motor Company.

=== Finance career ===
In addition to being president of the Michigan Central, he also served as president and, later, chairman of the board of the Union Trust Company and a director of the Peoples State Bank of Detroit.

== Personal life ==
On October 15, 1867, Ledyard was married to Mary L'Hommedieu (1847–1895), a daughter of Stephen Satterly L'Hommedieu (president of the Cincinnati, Hamilton and Dayton Railroad) and Alma (née Hammond) L'Hommedieu. Together, they were the parents of:

- Matilda Cass Ledyard (1871–1960), who married Baron Clemens von Ketteler, a German diplomat.
- Henry Brockholst Ledyard III (1875–1932), who married Mary Alice Maude Hendrie (1877–1928), daughter of William Hendrie of Hamilton, Ontario, in 1900.
- Augustus Canfield Ledyard (1877–1899), a First lieutenant with the 6th U.S. Infantry who died during the Philippine–American War.
- Hugh Ledyard (1885–1951), the secretary and treasurer of the Art Stove Company of Detroit.

He was a member of the New York Society of the Cincinnati by right of his descent from Major Benjamin Ledyard of the 1st New York Regiment.

His wife died unexpectedly on March 30, 1895. Ledyard died on May 25, 1921, at his home in Grosse Pointe Farms, Michigan. After a quiet funeral at Grace Episcopal Church, he was buried at Elmwood Cemetery in Detroit.
