= Stephen S. L'Hommedieu =

Stephen Satterly L'Hommedieu (Note: His name is sometimes spelled Stephen Satterlee L'Hommedieu.) (January 5, 1806 – May 25, 1875) was an American publisher and railroad executive and who served as president of the Cincinnati, Hamilton and Dayton Railroad Company.

== Early life ==
L'Hommedieu was born on January 5, 1806, in Sag Harbor, New York. He was a son of Charles L'Hommedieu (1778–1813) and Sarah B. (née Satterly) L'Hommedieu (1778–1837), who moved to Cincinnati, Ohio, in 1810. His elder brother was Samuel L'Hommedieu and his younger sister was Maria Marguerite L'Hommedieu, who married Jacob Long and, after his death in 1834, Orson Britton.

His paternal grandparents were Sarah (née White) L'Hommedieu and Capt. Samuel L'Hommedieu, who served in the Second Regiment of New York Militia during the American Revolution. His aunt, Mary L'Hommedieu was the wife of Rev. John D. Gardiner, a Yale graduate who was pastor of the Sag Harbor Presbyterian Church. Stephen's grandfather Samuel was a nephew of Ezra L'Hommedieu, the Continental Congressman from New York. The L'Hommedieu family were descended from Benjamin L'Hommedieu, a Huguenot and civil engineer who was born in La Rochelle, France and emigrated to Southold, New York, on Long Island in 1690.

== Career ==
At the age of 12, he was sent to learn business from his uncle John C. Avery, and by 1821 was in the office of the Cincinnati Gazette of which he became a partner upon reaching the age of majority. He remained an owner and publisher of the paper until his retirement in 1848. In politics, he was a Whig and became a delegate to the Whig Convention at Philadelphia in 1839 where General Taylor was nominated for the presidency instead of Henry Clay, who L'Hommedieu supported.

L'Hommedieu was involved in the construction of the Cincinnati, Hamilton and Dayton Railroad, which was chartered in 1846 with capital of $500,000 and was elected president of the road on July 3, 1848. The road struggled with right of way issues but eventually opened on September 22, 1851, and earned about $300,000 in its first year. In 1863, he added the Dayton and Michigan Railroad to the line and acquired a controlling interest in the Cincinnati, Richmond and Chicago Railroad, extending from Hamilton to Richmond. He served as president for twenty-two years before retiring in 1871 after which he "took an extensive tour of the Old World, embracing Egypt and the Holy Land."

== Personal life ==
In 1830, L'Hommedieu was married to Alma Hammond (1812–1890), a daughter of Sally (née Tillinghast) Hammond and Charles Hammond, associate justice of the Ohio Supreme Court. Together, they were the parents of:

- Tillinghast L'Hommedieu (1831–1863), a Union Army officer who was killed in battle at Pulaski, Tennessee.
- Sallie S. L'Hommedieu (1833–1895), who married Joseph Jermain Slocum, brother of Margaret Olivia Slocum Sage, in 1854.
- Marie Antoinette L'Hommedieu (1836–1928), who married William Collins Reynolds (1837–1897), a son of James Lusk Reynolds, 1860.
- Stephen Satterly L'Hommedieu Jr. (1842–1883), an Ohio State Congressman who married Florence Symmes (1840–1927), a granddaughter of John Cleves Symmes Jr.
- Alma Hammond L'Hommedieu (1843–1921), who married Gen. George David Ruggles, in 1868.
- Mary R. L'Hommedieu (1847–1895), who married Henry Brockholst Ledyard Jr., son of Henry Ledyard, in 1867.
- Charles Hammond L'Hommedieu (1848–1916)
- Richard Henry L'Hommedieu (1850–1918), who married Angelina Catherwood Marston (1855–1944), a daughter of Thomas Marston, a woodenware merchant from Chicago.
- Louis L'Hommedieu (1855–1919), who married Stella C. Edwards (1856–1923), a daughter of Abraham C. Edwards.

In 1870, he commissioned Hiram Powers to create a portrait of his wife which was completed three years later, only a short time before Powers' death.

L'Hommedieu died on May 25, 1875, in West Point, New York, while visiting his grandson at the U.S. Military Academy. His widow died in 1890.
