= Henry Ledyard =

American politician (1812–1880)

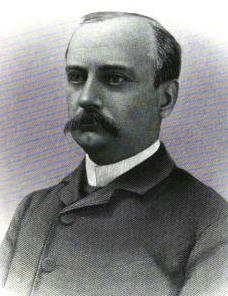

Mayor of Detroit
- In office 1855–1855
- Preceded by: Oliver Moulton Hyde
- Succeeded by: Oliver Moulton Hyde

Personal details
- Born: Henry Brockholst Ledyard; March 5, 1812 New York City, U.S.
- Died: June 7, 1880 (aged 68) London, England
- Party: Democratic
- Spouse: Matilda Frances Cass (m. 1839)
- Children: 5, including Lewis
- Parent(s): Benjamin Ledyard; Susan French Livingston
- Relatives: Henry Livingston (grandfather); Lewis Cass (father-in-law)
- Education: Columbia College

Henry Brockholst Ledyard Sr. (March 5, 1812 – June 7, 1880) was the mayor of Detroit, Michigan, and a state senator, briefly served as assistant secretary under Secretary of State Lewis Cass, and was the president of the Newport Hospital and the Redwood Library in Newport, Rhode Island.

== Early life ==
Ledyard was born in New York City on March 5, 1812, the son of New York lawyer Benjamin Ledyard (1779–1812) and Susan French Livingston (1789–1864). His mother was the daughter of Revolutionary War Colonel and US Supreme Court justice Henry Brockholst Livingston (1757–1823) and granddaughter of New Jersey governor William Livingston.

Ledyard graduated from Columbia College in 1830, and began practicing law in New York. When Lewis Cass was appointed Minister to France in 1836, Ledyard accompanied him to Paris, eventually becoming chargé d’affaires of the embassy.

== Career ==
Ledyard returned to the United States in 1844 and moved to Detroit, where he was active in the city and managed Cass's property holdings. He was one of the founders of the State Savings Bank, one of the original promoters of the Elmwood Cemetery, and was a member of the Board of Education.

He organized and promoted the first plank road company in Michigan, and was involved in a number of other ventures that promoted communication between Detroit and the interior of the state. In 1849–1850 he was an alderman of the city, and served as mayor in 1855 and was one of the original commissioners on the Board of Water Commissioners.

Ledyard was a Democrat, and was elected as a state senator in 1857. However, when Lewis Cass was appointed Secretary of State under James Buchanan, Ledyard resigned his post in the legislature and accompanied him to Washington, DC, and remained there until 1861, briefly serving as assistant secretary of state. Afterwards, he moved to Newport, Rhode Island, where he lived for the rest of his life. He raised funds for and was the first president of the Newport Hospital, and was the president of the Redwood Library in Newport.

== Personal life ==
In 1839, Ledyard married Cass's daughter Matilda Frances Cass (1808–1898). The couple had five children:

- Elizabeth Cass Ledyard (1840–1918), who married to Francis Wayland Goddard (1833–1889) in 1862.
- Henry Brockholst Ledyard Jr. (1844–1921), a twin, who married Mary R. L'Hommedieu (1847–1895). He was president of the Michigan Central Railroad and the Union Trust Company.
- Susan Livingston Ledyard (1844–1877), a twin, who married to Hamilton Bullock Tompkins (1843–1921) in 1876. She died the following year.
- Lewis Cass Ledyard (1851–1932), who married to Gertrude Prince (1851–1905) in 1878. After Gertrude's death in 1905, Lewis married Isabelle Henning Morris in 1906. He was a prominent New York lawyer in the firm Carter Ledyard & Milburn, president of the New York Public Library, and personal counsel to J. Pierpont Morgan.
- Matilda Spencer Ledyard (b. 1860).

Henry Ledyard died June 7, 1880, in London, England, during a brief European visit.

=== Descendants ===
Through his eldest son Henry, he was the grandfather of Matilda Cass Ledyard (1871–1960), who married Baron Clemens von Ketteler (1853–1900), a German diplomat, Henry B. Ledyard III (1875–1932), Augustus Canfield Ledyard (1877–1899), and Hugh Ledyard (1885–1951).

Political offices
Preceded by Oliver Moulton Hyde	Mayor of Detroit; 1855	Succeeded by Oliver Moulton Hyde
