= Cincinnati, Hamilton and Dayton Railway (1846–1917) =

Railway in Ohio, United States

Cincinnati, Hamilton and Dayton Railroad

Overview
- Locale: Ohio
- Dates of operation: 1846–1917
- Successor: Baltimore and Ohio Railroad

Technical
- Track gauge: 4 ft 8 1/2 in (1,435 mm) standard gauge
- Previous gauge: originally 4 ft 10 in (1,473 mm) Some predecessor roads 3 ft (914 mm)

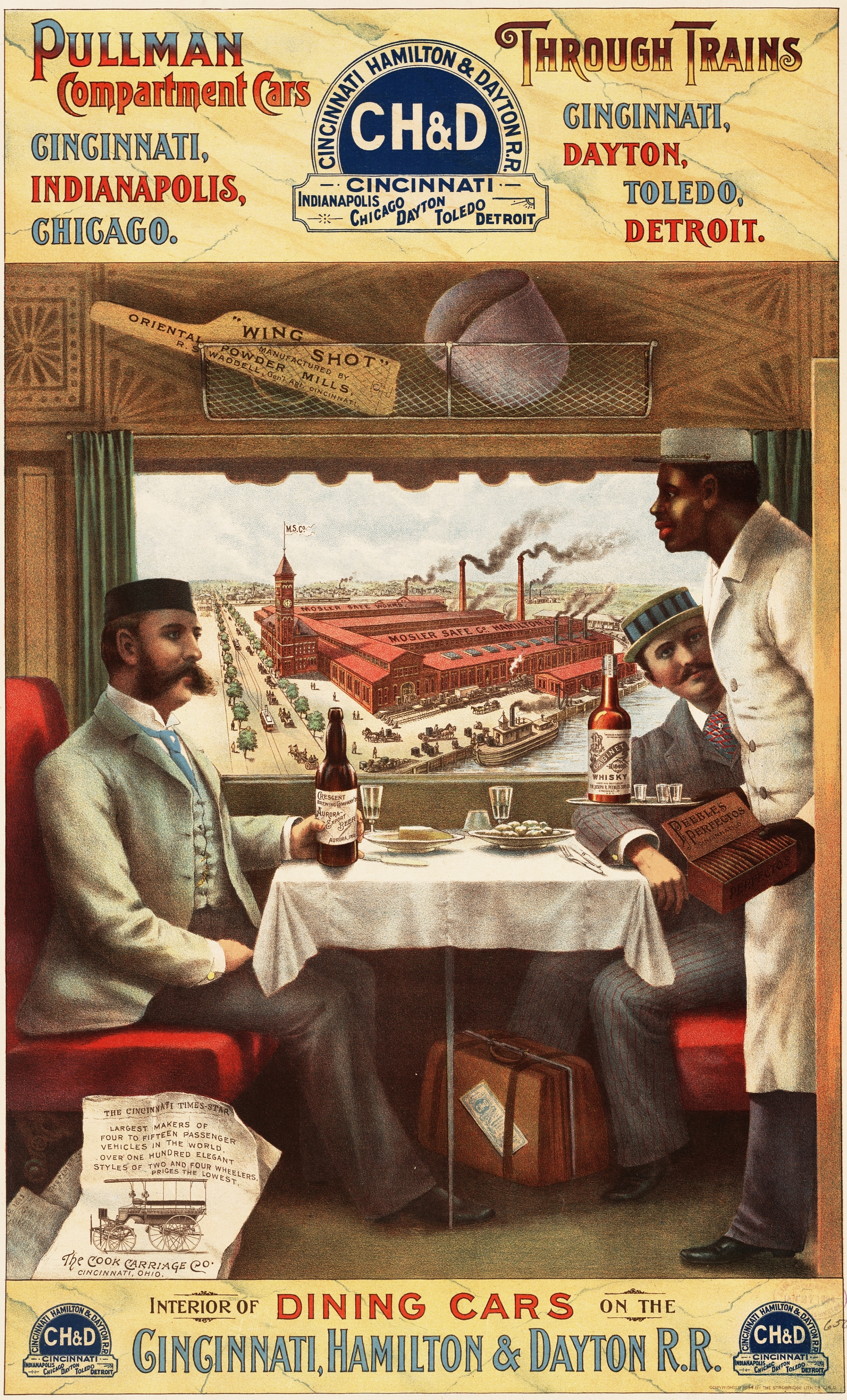
Interior of a Pullman dining car on the Cincinnati, Hamilton and Dayton Railway, 1894

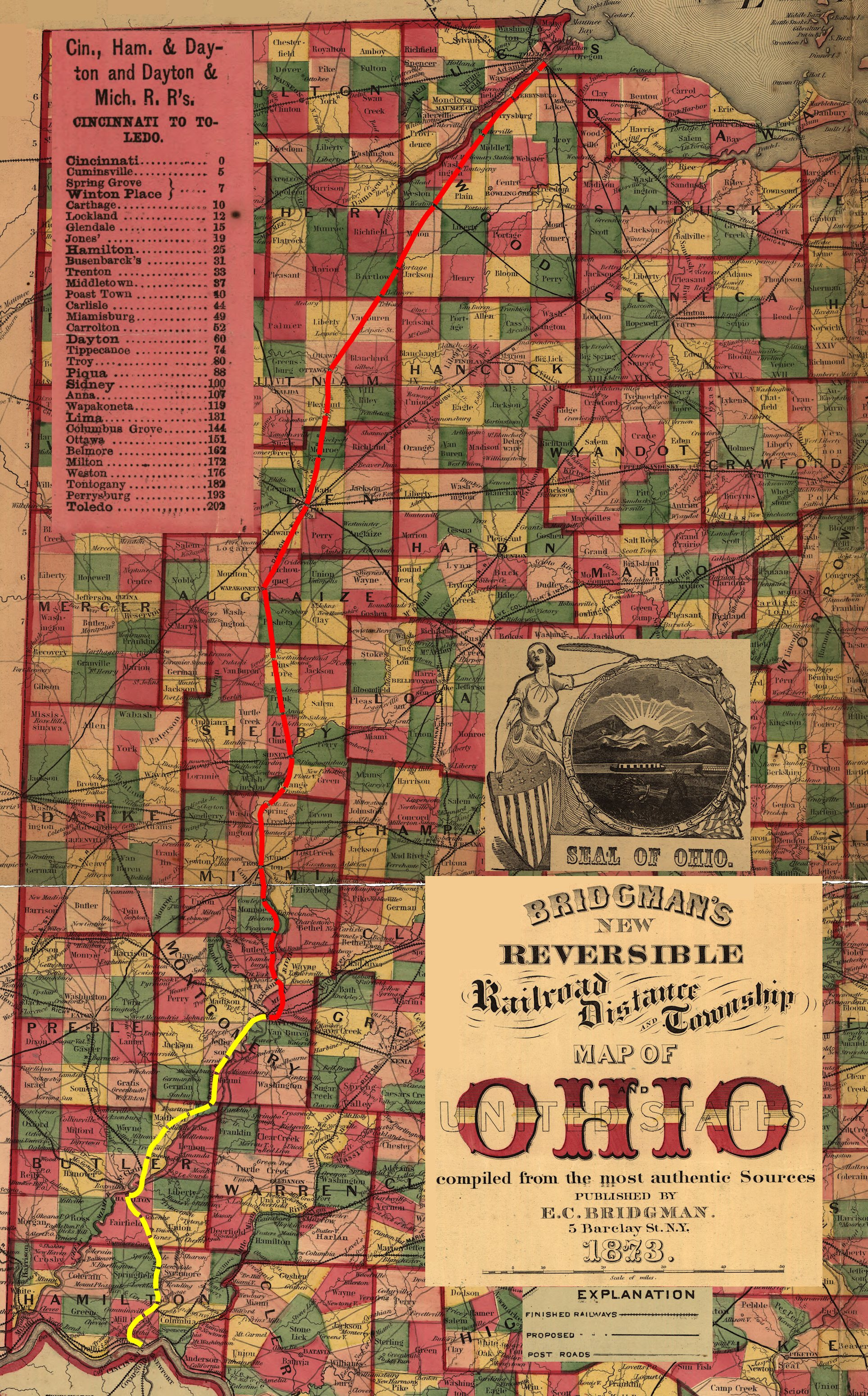
Map of the C H and D RR in 1873, D and M RR is in red; C H and D in yellow.

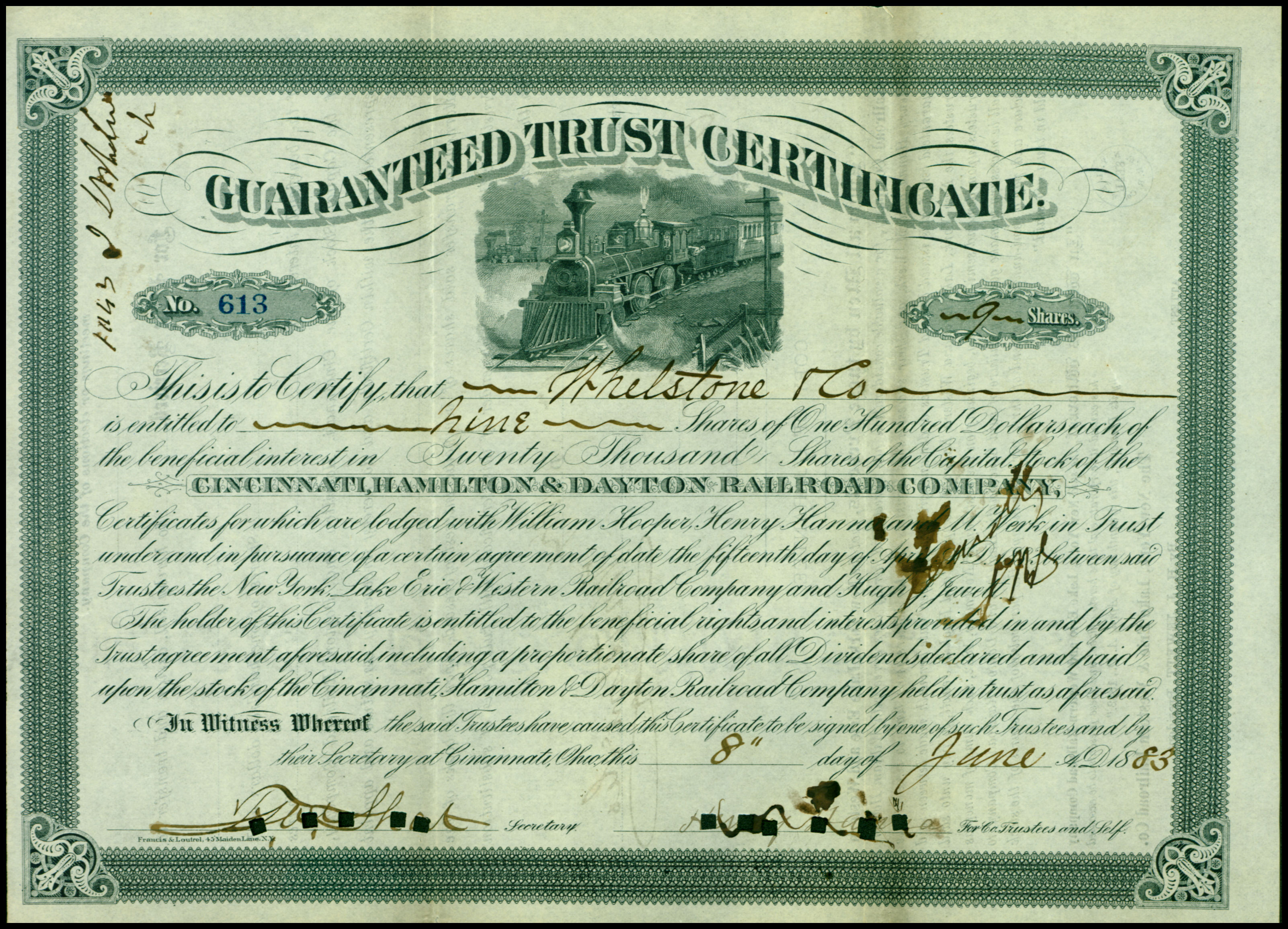
Trust certificate of the Cincinnati, Hamilton & Dayton Railroad Company, issued 8. June 1883

The Cincinnati, Hamilton and Dayton Railway (CH&D) was a railroad based in the U.S. state of Ohio that existed between its incorporation on March 2, 1846, and its acquisition by the Baltimore and Ohio Railroad in December 1917. It was originally chartered to build from Cincinnati to Hamilton, Ohio, and then to Dayton, a distance of 59 mi (95 km); further construction and acquisition extended the railroad, and by 1902 it owned or controlled 640 mi (1,030 km) of railroad. Its stock and bond value plunged in late 1905 after "financial mismanagement of the properties" was revealed. The company was reorganized as the Toledo and Cincinnati Railroad in 1917.

== Acquisitions ==
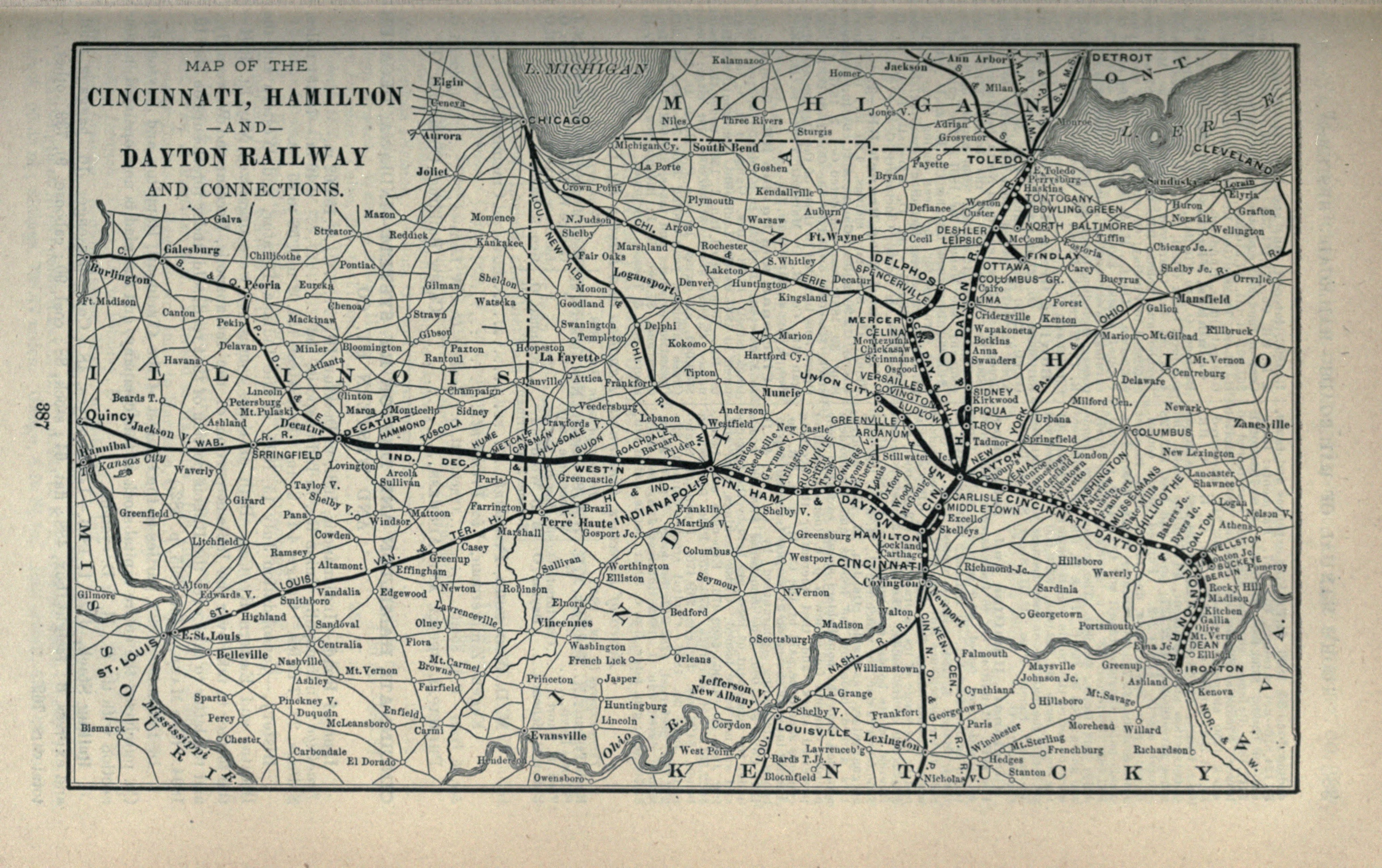
Map of the CH&D in 1896

The original CH&D was founded by John Alexander Collins, who was born on June 8, 1815, in Staffordshire, England. He came to the US as a child in 1825, and worked as a locomotive engineer until moving to Ohio in 1851 to open the CH&D. Collins remained with the line until 1872, six years before his death in Covington, Kentucky. Collins is buried in Woodland Cemetery in Dayton, where his tombstone details his life and its work.

The railway received a charter from the State of Ohio on March 2, 1846, as the "Cincinnati and Hamilton Railroad". The name was changed by the legislature to the Cincinnati, Hamilton and Dayton Railway on February 8, 1847. Stephen S. L'Hommedieu was elected president of the road on July 3, 1848. Work on the road began in 1850, and by September of that year the right of way had been obtained between Cincinnati and Hamilton, with the right of way between Hamilton and Dayton being sought. The road was graded by this time as well, since iron for the rails had arrived. By May 1851, the entire right of way was purchased and grading along the entire route finished. The first trains ran on September 18, 1851: Two special inaugural trains from Dayton met two special inaugural trains from Cincinnati at Hamilton.

On May 1, 1863, the CH&D leased the Dayton and Michigan Railroad in perpetuity and, later, acquired a controlling interest in the Cincinnati, Richmond and Chicago Railroad, extending from Hamilton to Richmond. L'Hommedieu retired in June 1870, shortly before his death in 1875, and was succeeded by D. McLaren as president of the road. In 1891, it acquired the Cincinnati, Dayton and Chicago Railroad, while in March of that year it added the Cincinnati, Dayton and Ironton Railroad.

In 1886 the CH&D was among the railroads controlled by the financial speculator Henry S. Ives before his spectacular collapse the following year.

== The CH&D in Lima, Ohio ==
The Dayton and Michigan was the second railroad to reach Lima, Ohio, reaching there in 1858. By 1880, they had established a significant shop facility on the north side of town with over two hundred employees. The Dayton and Michigan had a freight depot west of the tracks and south of East North Street, between North Central Avenue (once Tanner Street) and North Jackson Street. Successor CH&D built a larger structure on the site, which continued to be used by the Baltimore and Ohio at least into the 1950s. The passenger depot followed a similar pattern, but was located farther north, between East Wayne Street and the Pennsylvania Railroad tracks.

== See also ==
- List of defunct Ohio railroads
- List of defunct Illinois railroads
- List of defunct Indiana railroads
