= East River Road Historic District =

Historic house in Michigan, United States

- U.S. National Register of Historic Places
- U.S. Historic district
- Michigan State Historic Site
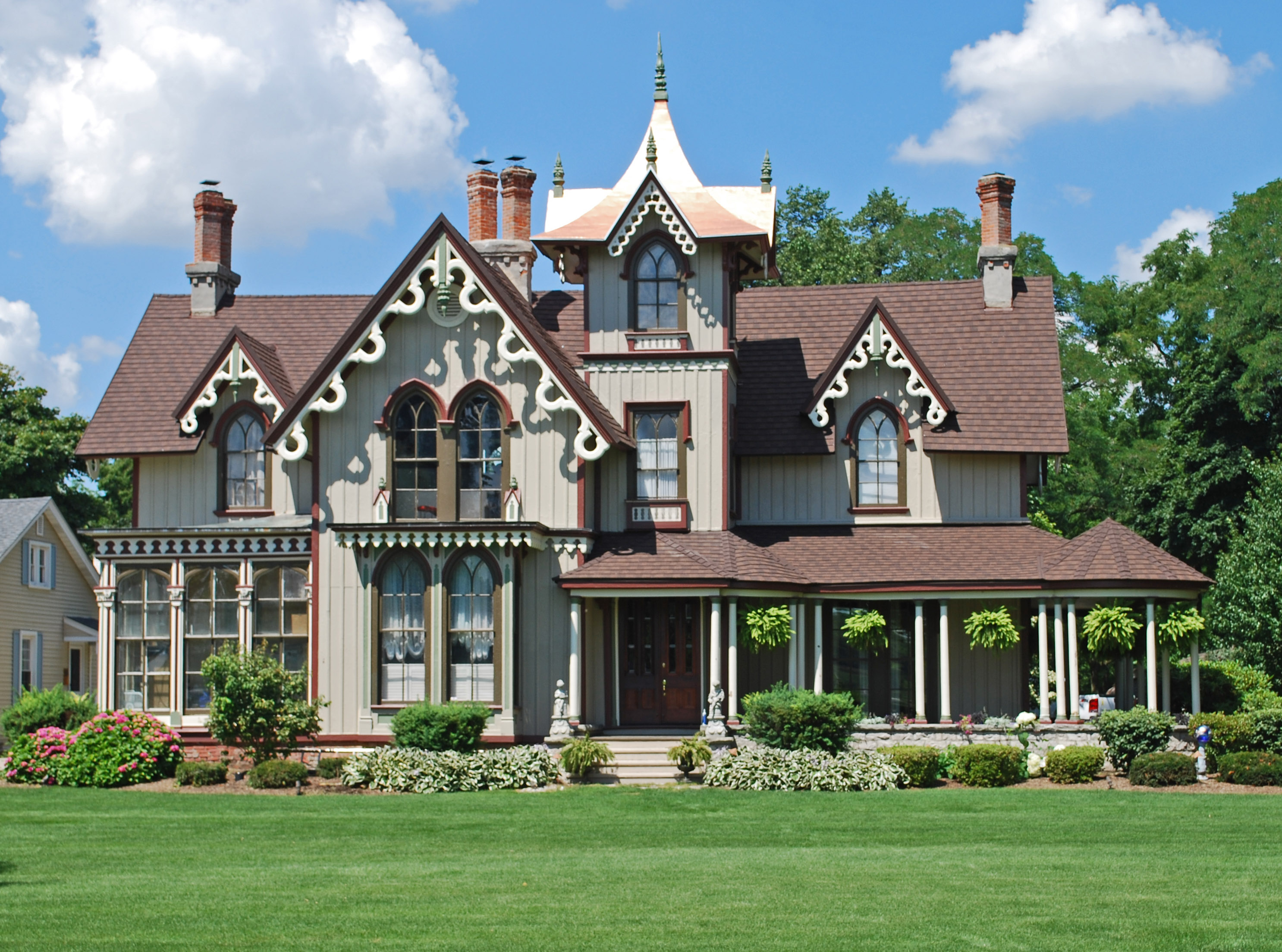
- Gothic Revival "Wedding Cake House" on East River Road

- Location within Michigan Location within the United States
- Interactive map
- Location: E. River Rd., Grosse Ile, Michigan
- Coordinates: 42°7′33″N 83°8′30″W
- Area: 18 acres (7.3 ha)
- Architect: Gordon W. Lloyd
- Architectural style: Gothic Revival, Swiss Chalet
- NRHP reference No.: 74001003

Significant dates
- Added to NRHP: August 13, 1974
- Designated MSHS: June 16, 1972

The East River Road Historic District is a historic district located along East River Road near the Grosse Ile Parkway in Grosse Ile, Michigan. The district is a small island community composed of eleven structures, including seven houses, two outbuildings, St. James Episcopal Church, and the Michigan Central Railroad depot. The district stretches from St. James Episcopal Church on the south to Littlecote on the north. The district was designated a Michigan State Historic Site in 1972 and listed on the National Register of Historic Places in 1973. The historically significant 1870s customs house was moved into the district in 1979.

== Houses ==
The East River Road Historic District contains several homes built between 1840 and 1870, many of them by Gordon W. Lloyd. The houses in the district are all situated along East River Road, facing the Detroit River with pleasant views and large yards. They are primarily Gothic Revival and Swiss Chalet in style, of both limestone and wood, and heavily ornamented with gingerbread.

These homes were built for Detroit's affluent families, who sought clean and peaceful locations to spend the summer out of the unhealthy city atmosphere. Lloyd's Gothic Revival designs contribute to the ambience of the island, making it an attractive location for many of Detroit's most prominent 19th-century families. The residents and architects who built these houses were strongly influenced by Andrew Jackson Downing and his publications, Cottage Residences and The Architecture of Country Houses.

Among these houses are:

=== Dallas Norvell House ===
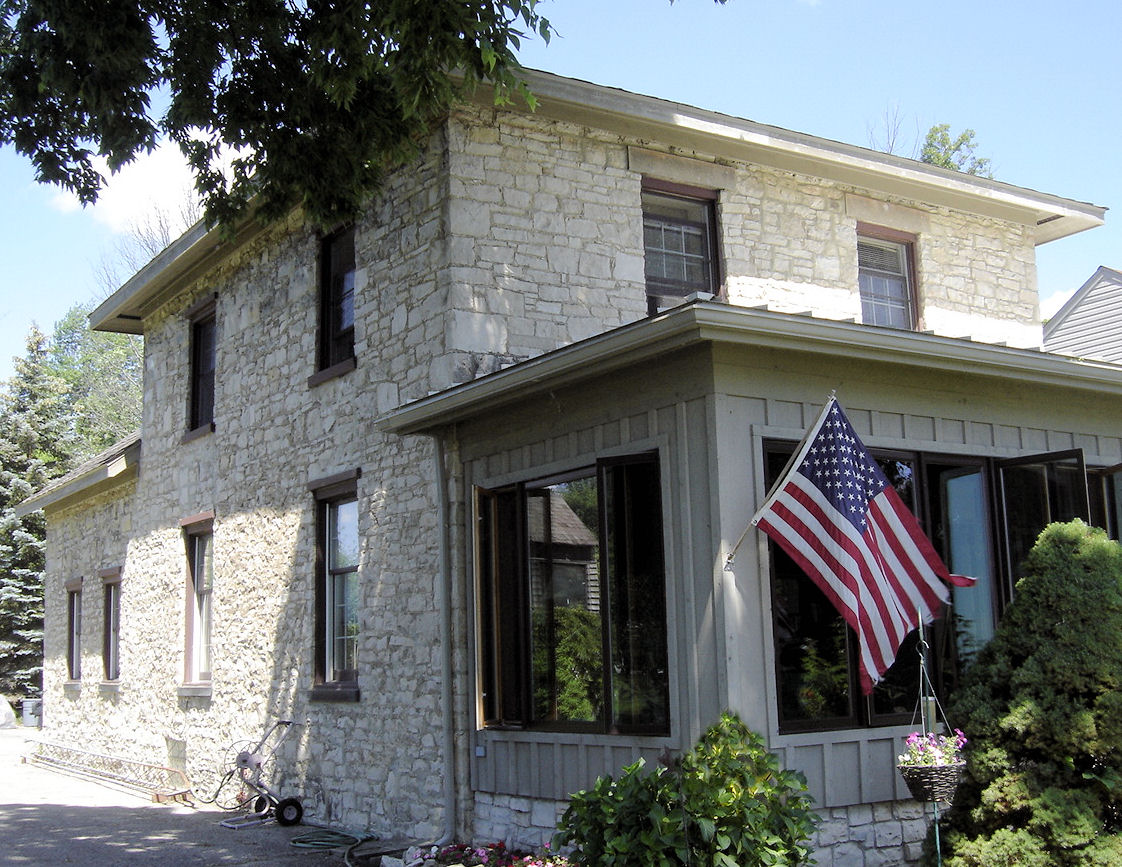
Dallas Norvell House

This house was constructed of native stone from the quarry on Grosse Ile in 1851 for Dallas Norvell, the son of Michigan U.S. Senator John Norvell. Dallas Norvell (July 28, 1825, Philadelphia, Pennsylvania – March 5, 1888, Amerstburg, Ontario) attended the University of Michigan and was later a gentleman farmer on Grosse Ile. He served as supervisor of Monguagon Township (1856, 1860–1866). He also served as Deputy Postmaster of Detroit. About 1870 he moved to Canada, as he felt the Island was becoming too crowded with "City Folks" from Detroit.

=== Samuel T. Douglass House ===
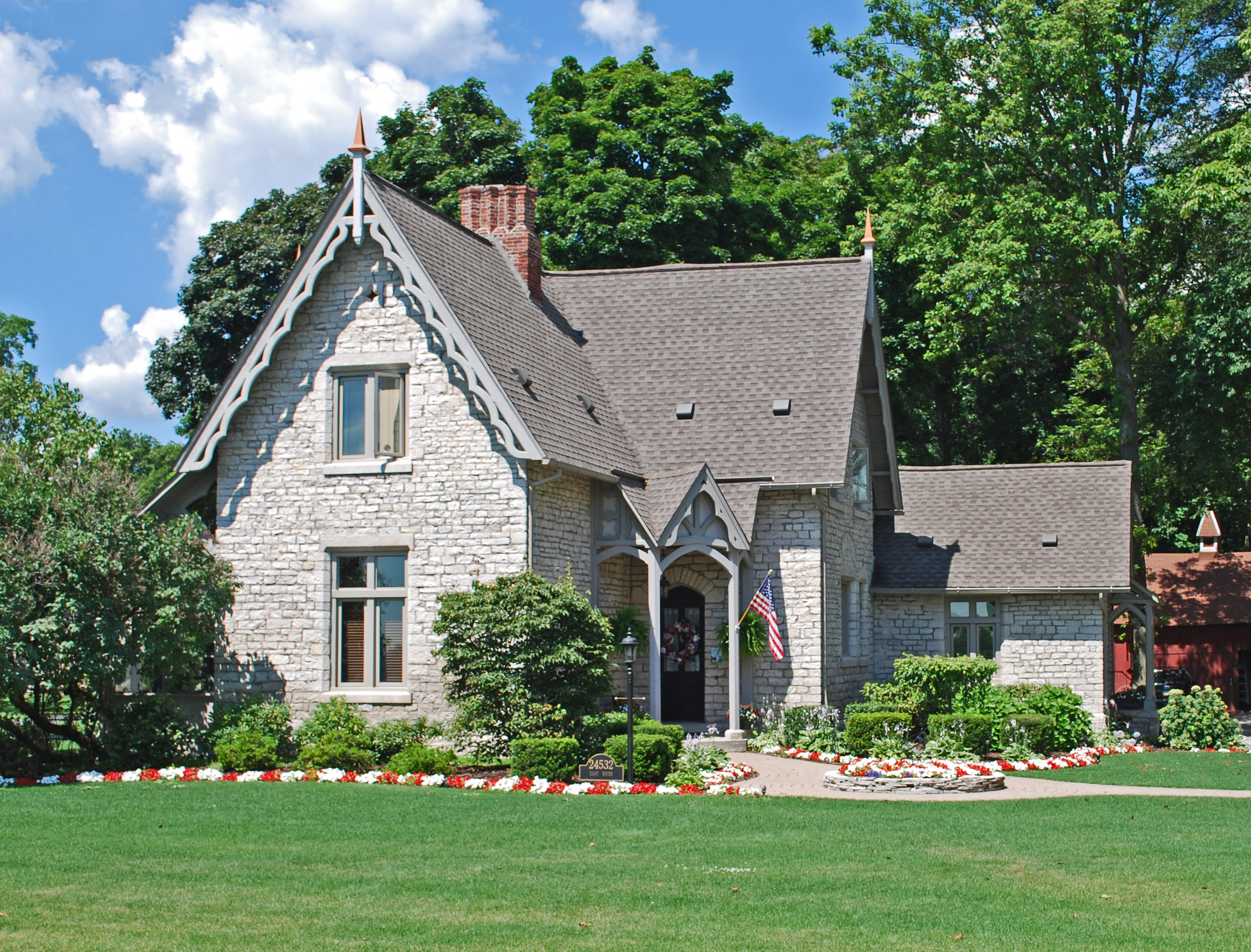
Samuel T Douglass House

The Samuel T. Douglass House, also known as "Littlecote," was built in 1859 for Judge Samuel T Douglass and his wife, Elizabeth Campbell Douglass. It is a Gothic Revival cottage designed by Gordon W. Lloyd. The house is constructed of grey stone and has an ornamental chimney, intersecting gables with pierced bargeboards, numerous porches, and an oriel window.

=== Anthony Dudgeon House ===
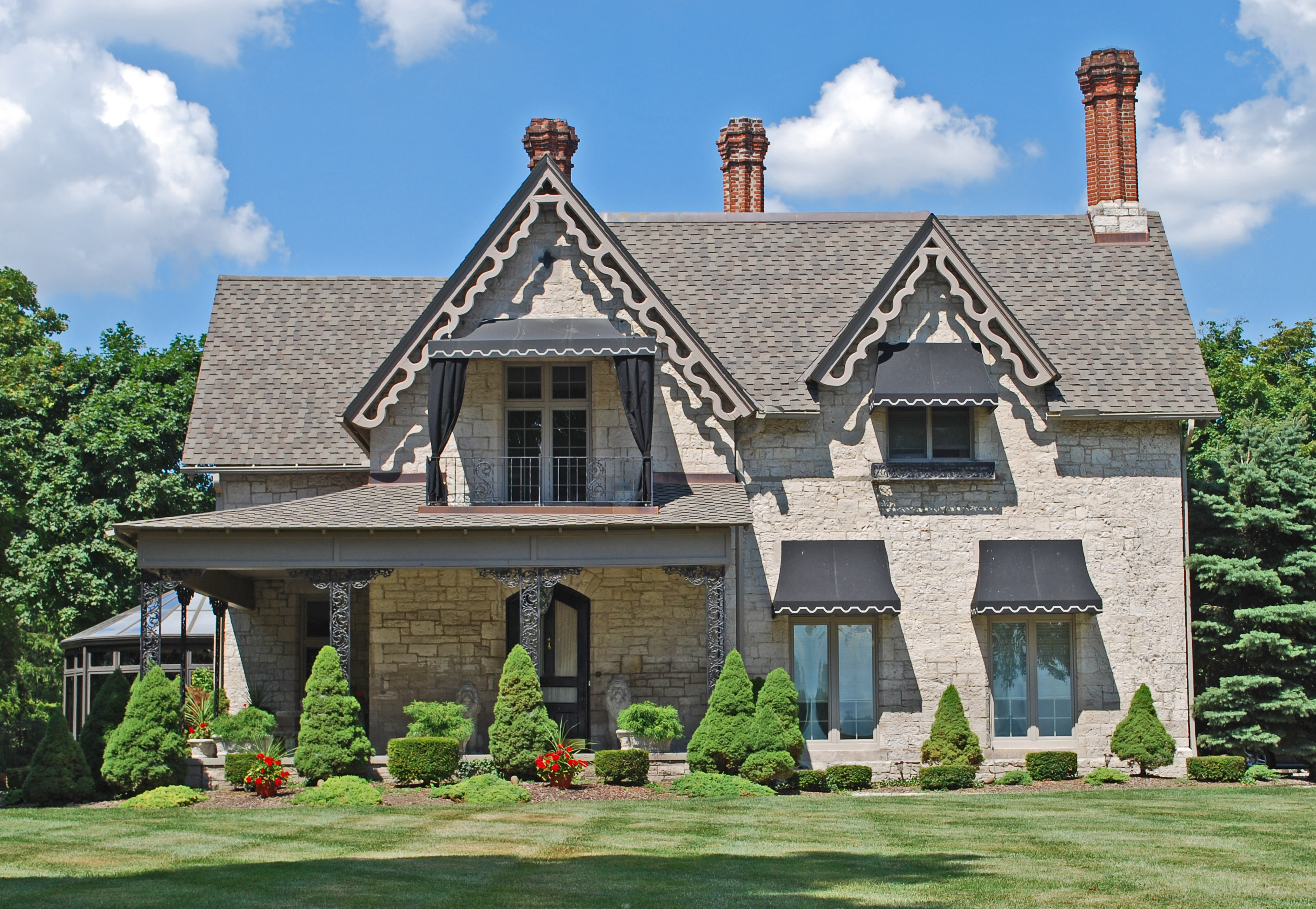
Anthony Dudgeon House

The Anthony Dudgeon House was built in 1859. It is a Gothic Revival structure designed by Gordon W. Lloyd. Shipping tycoon William Livingstone also lived in this house, calling it "Rio Vista."

=== Samuel Lewis House ===
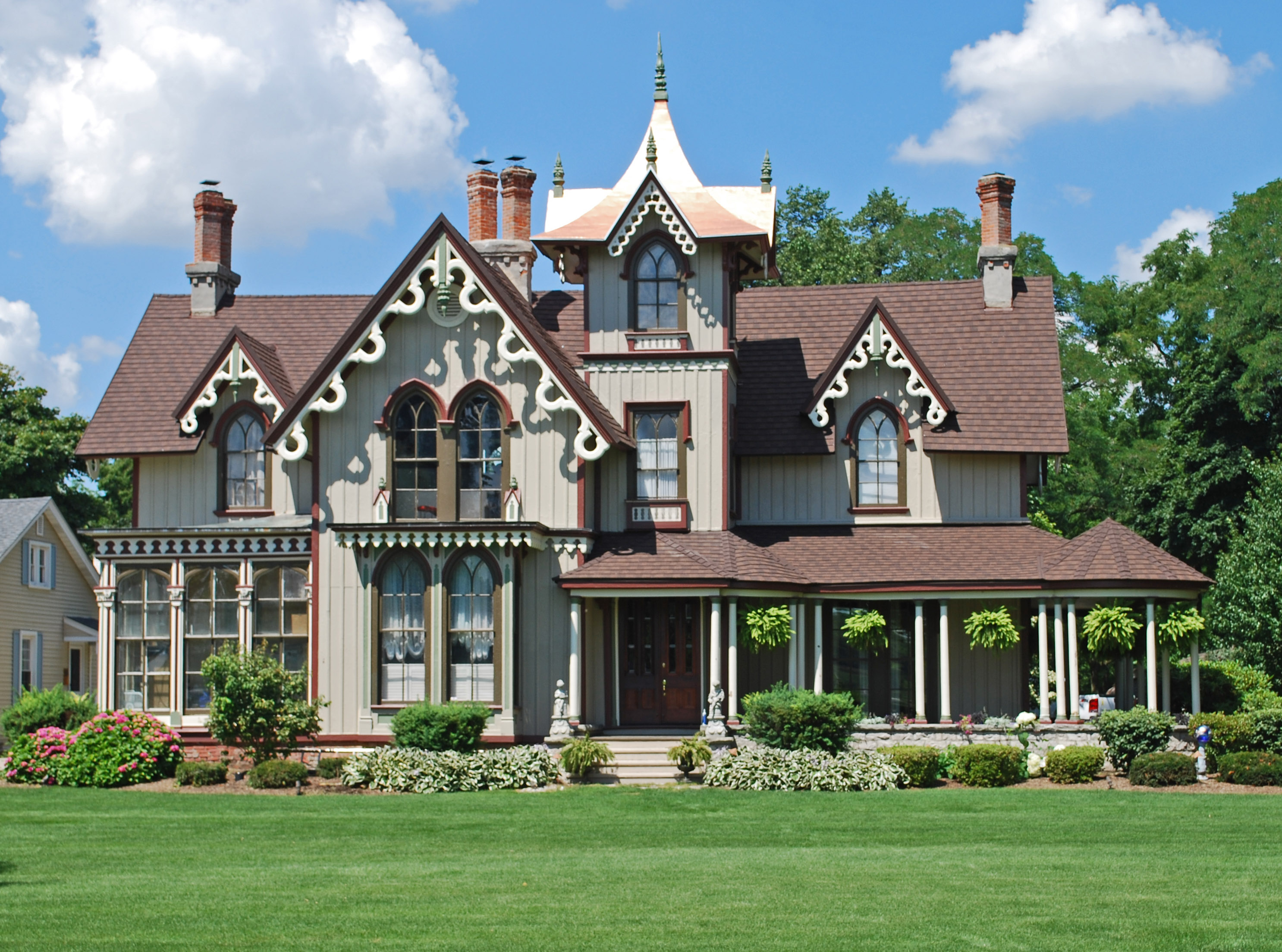
Samuel Lewis House

This house was built in 1859 for Samuel Lewis, a prominent Detroit banker. It is one of Michigan's finest examples of a Gothic Revival villa. The house is built of brick with a wooden board and batten veneer exterior. It has an ornamental chimney, intersecting decorative bargeboards, and a large veranda. Formerly known as "The Lilacs" due to a lilac hedge on the property, it is now known as "the Wedding Cake House." After Lewis, Detroit mayor Kirkland C. Barker lived in the house, after which it passed to Frank Osburn. The house has never been remodeled.

=== Frederick Anderson House ===
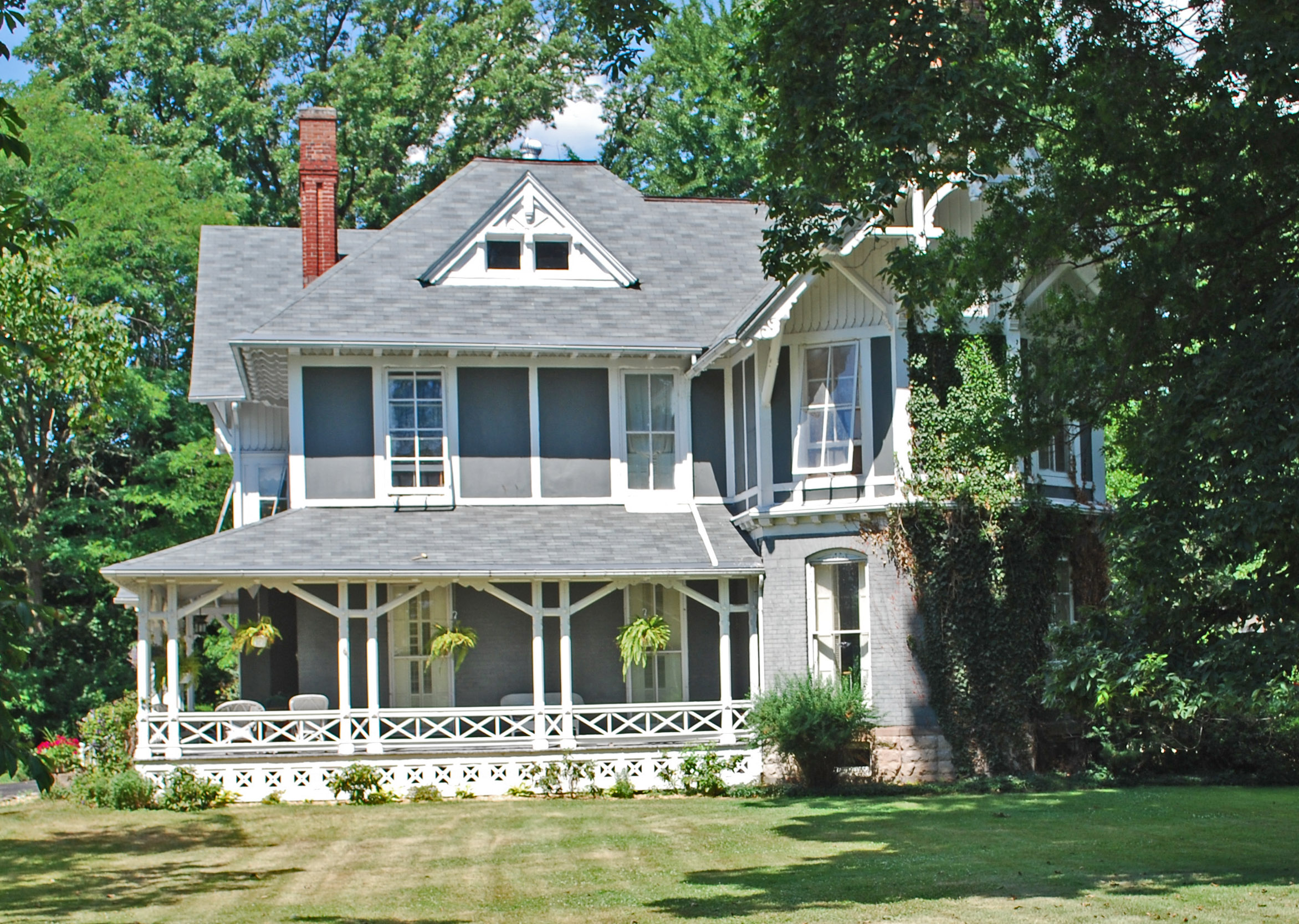
Frederick Anderson House

This house was built in 1881 for Dr. Frederick Pope Anderson and his wife, Mary Campbell Douglass (the daughter of Samuel T Douglass). It is a stick-style Victorian house, and boasts it a secret passage and a hidden bedroom.

== St. James Episcopal Church ==
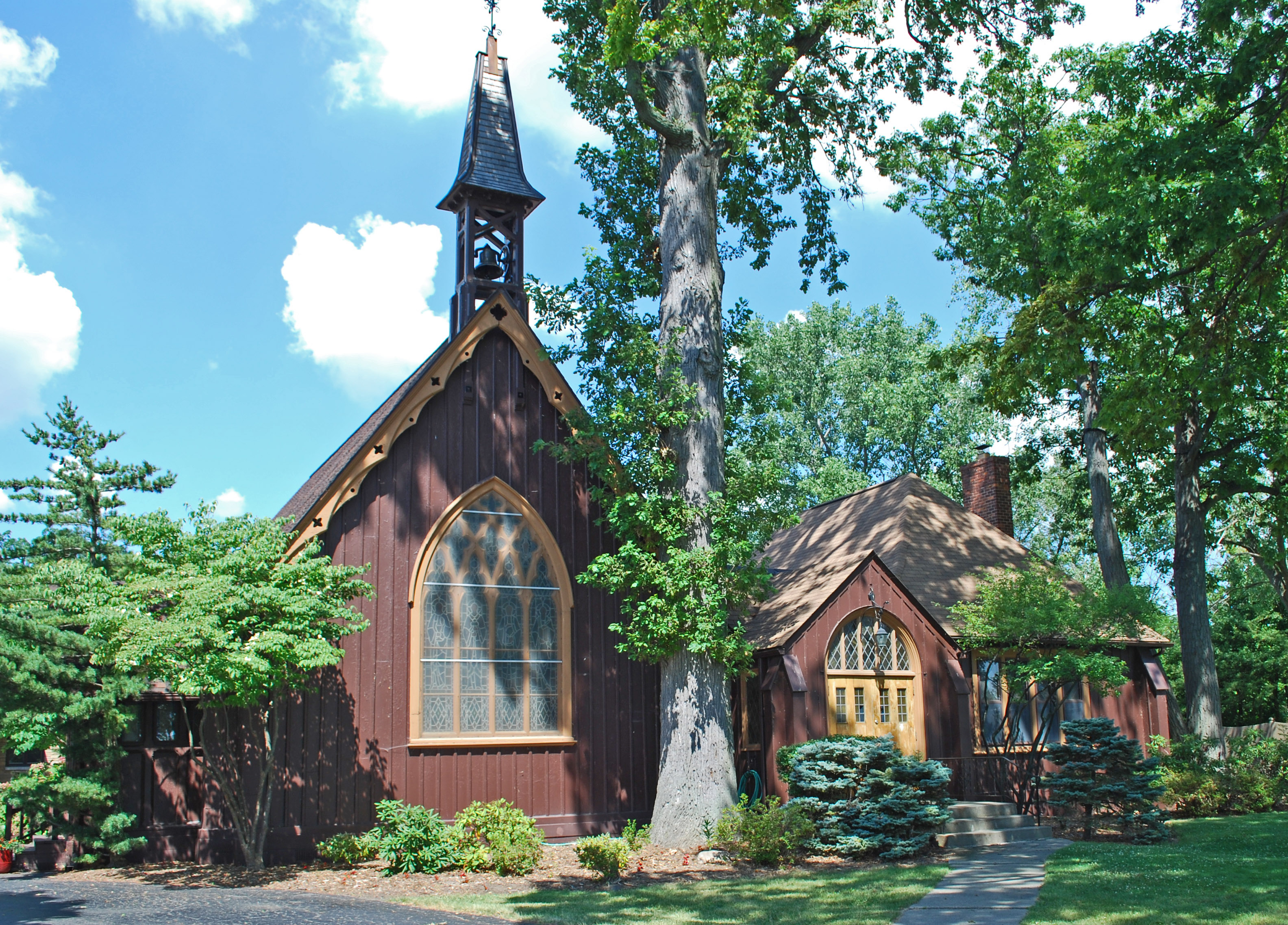
Facade of church showing Tiffany window

St. James Episcopal Church was constructed primarily with funds willed for the purpose by Lisette Denison Forth, a former slave. Forth had worked for some time in the household of Detroit mayor John Biddle and had become friends with Biddle's wife, Eliza. The two women, sharing an Episcopalian faith, made a vow to eventually build a chapel. When Lisette Forth died, she left the bulk of her estate, some $3000, to build a church. Eliza Biddle's son William, knowing his mother's wishes, supplemented Lisette's contribution with some of his own and some of his mother's money. William's brother James donated the land for the chapel, and the two hired architect Gordon W. Lloyd to design the structure.

The resulting church is a front-gable, Carpenter Gothic frame structure. The walls a vertical board and batten, and pierced bargeboards line the gables. The entrance is located on one side under a gable, and a frame steeple tops the church. The building has stained glass lancet windows, including the 1898 Tiffany window, Angel of Praise, which measures 11 feet by five-and-a-half feet. In the years since its construction, the church has undergone several repairs and had multiple additions, but the main structure remains substantially original and in excellent condition. The red doors of the structure are dedicated to the memory and benevolence of Lisette Denison Forth.

== Michigan Central Railroad Depot ==
Grosse Ile Depot, Canada Southern / Michigan Central Railroad Depot
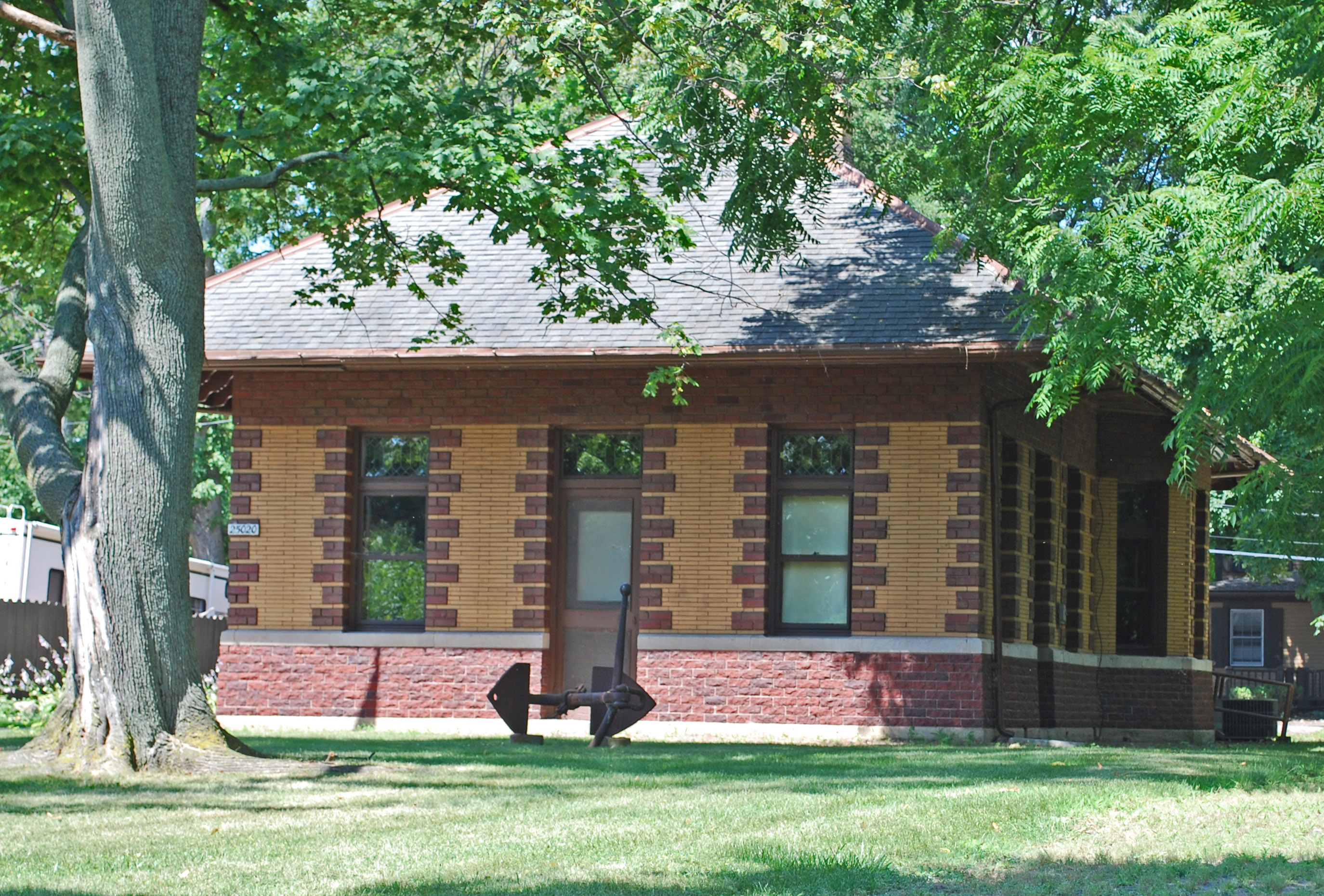
- Michigan Central Railroad Depot, 2010
- Interactive map of Grosse Ile Depot, Canada Southern / Michigan Central Railroad Depot

History
- Built: 1904

Michigan State Historic Site
- Designated: May 20, 1982

In 1873, Canada Southern Railway established a freight system across Grosse Ile, ferrying goods and passengers from nearby Amherstburg, Ontario, to Stony Island, then transporting them via rail across Grosse Ile along a track laid where the present-day Grosse Ile Parkway runs and thence to the mainland. Canada Southern built a passenger station and other facilities on Grosse Ile, on land purchased from the widow of Senator John Norvell, Isabella Hodgkiss Freeman Norvell and her son Dallas Norvell. However, the railroad soon ran into financial difficulties, and about 1880, the Michigan Central Railroad purchased Canada Southern. Michigan Central already operated a ferry service in Detroit, and phased out the operation in Grosse Ile. However, the population of affluent residents on Grosse Ile was growing, and the railroad expanded its passenger service, running as many as three round-trip trains from Detroit to Grosse Ile.

In 1904, the Michigan Central Railroad constructed this depot to replace the earlier frame structure. The depot is built of yellow brick with contrasting base, window surrounds, and quoins made of red brick. The depot has been used since 1967 by the Grosse Ile Historical Society.

The location of the station is cited upon land originally belonging to Isabella Hodgkiss Norvell, wife of US Senator John Norvell of Michigan.

== U.S. Customs House ==
U.S. Customs House
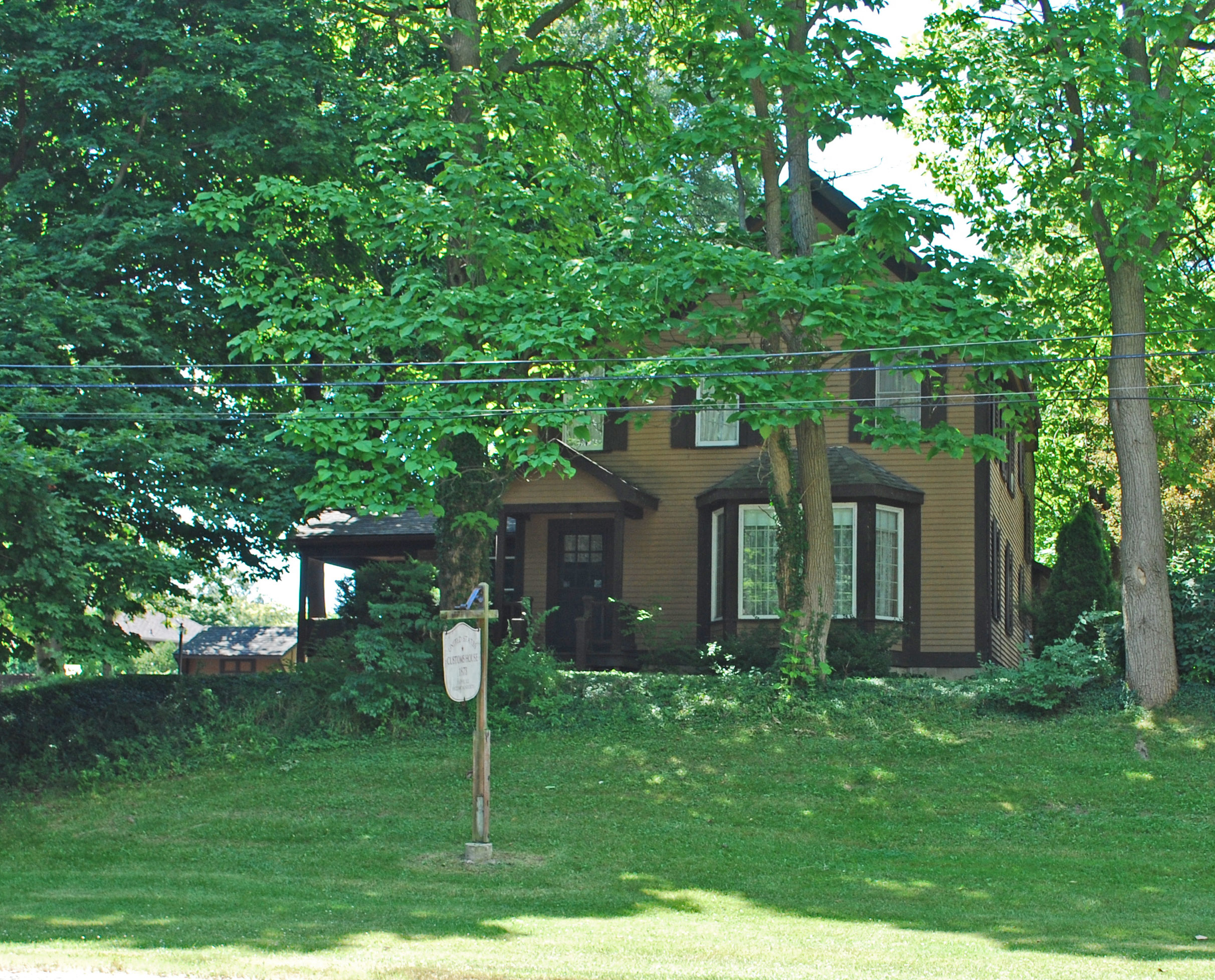
- U.S. Customs House, 2010
- Interactive map of U.S. Customs House

History
- Built: 1871

Michigan State Historic Site
- Designated: May 20, 1982

The Customs House was built in 1871 at what is now 7799 Macomb Street to service the ferry and freight line being constructed by the Canada Southern Railway. With the stoppage of freight traffic, the customs house closed in 1883. The building later served as Grosse Ile's first post office, and in 1904 it was converted to a private house. In 1979, it was restored and moved to its present location behind the depot. The Customs House was designated a Michigan State Historic Site in 1982, and the building is currently used by the Grosse Ile Historical Society.
