= Samuel Douglass =

Samuel Douglass may refer to:

- Samuel T. Douglass, American lawyer and jurist in Michigan
- Samuel Douglass (politician), American politician in Vermont
