= Saint Paul Catholic Church (Grosse Pointe Farms, Michigan) =

Historic church in Michigan, United States

- Saint Paul Catholic Church Complex
- U.S. National Register of Historic Places
- Michigan State Historic Site
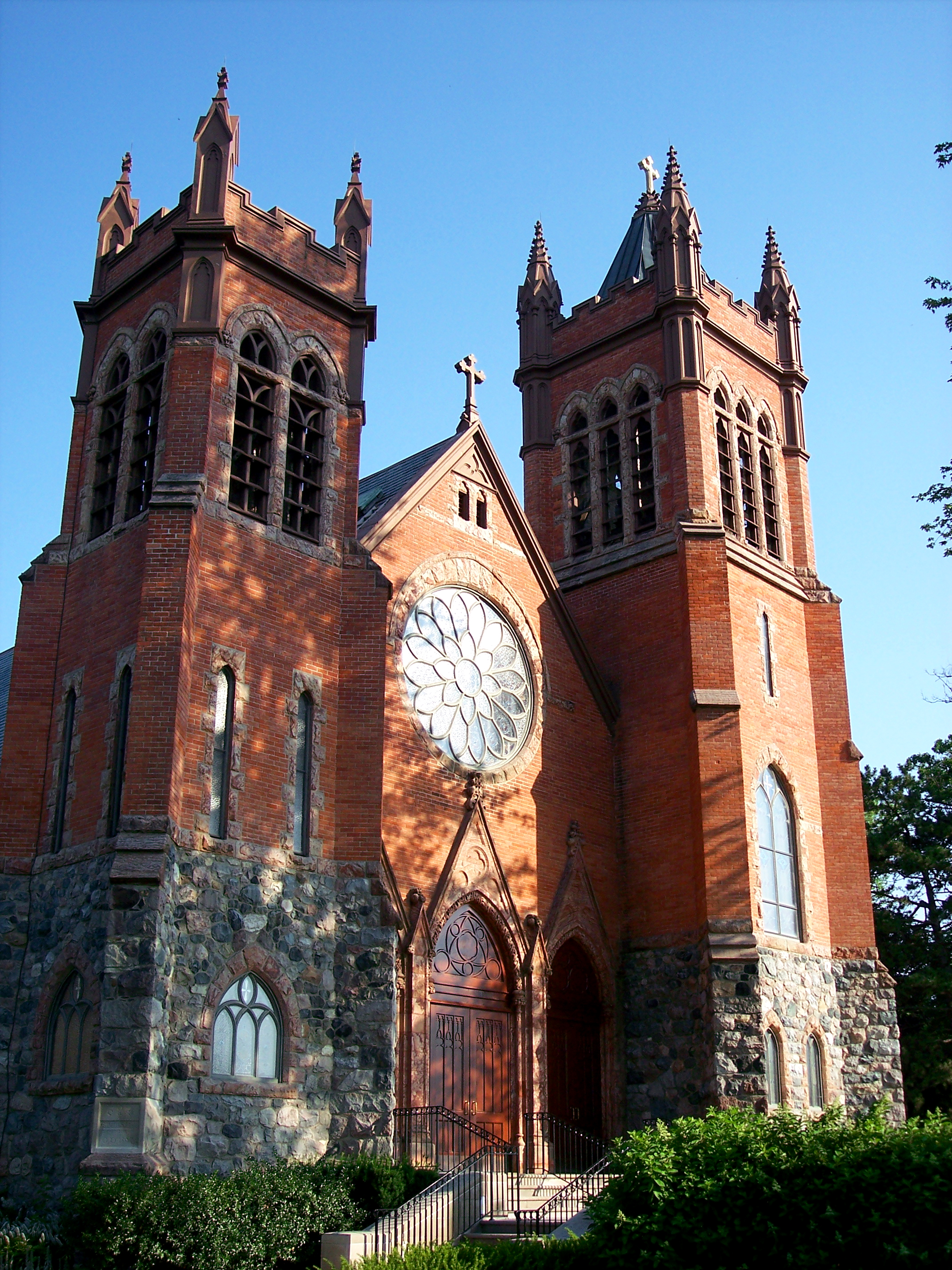
- Designed in French Gothic Revival style.

- Location within Michigan Location within the United States
- Interactive map
- Location: 157 Lake Shore Rd., Grosse Pointe Farms, Michigan
- Coordinates: 42°23′41″N 82°53′37″W
- Built: 1895
- Architect: Harry J. Rill; Smith, Hinchman & Grylls
- Architectural style: French Gothic, Neo-Tudor, Colonial Revival
- NRHP reference No.: 94000621

Significant dates
- Added to NRHP: June 17, 1994
- Designated MSHS: October 15, 1992

The Saint Paul Catholic Church Complex is located at 157 Lake Shore Road in the Detroit suburb of Grosse Pointe Farms, Michigan. The group includes a French Gothic-style church, a Neo-Tudor rectory, a Colonial Revival parish hall, a Neo-Tudor school building, and an Elizabethan Revival convent. The complex was designated a Michigan State Historic Site in 1992 and listed on the National Register of Historic Places in 1994. The parish is usually referred to as St. Paul on the Lake.

== History ==
The St. Paul Roman Catholic parish was the first Catholic parish in the Grosse Pointes. The origins of the parish date to the 1790s, when French Catholic priests were ministering to settlers in what was then a primarily agricultural area along Lake St. Clair. The first building specifically built for worship was a log church, dedicated in 1825 by Father Francis Badin, located near the lake in what is now Grosse Pointe Shores. The parish was officially organized in 1835, and in 1848 the log church was replaced by a frame chapel located on the site of the current church.

== Architecture ==
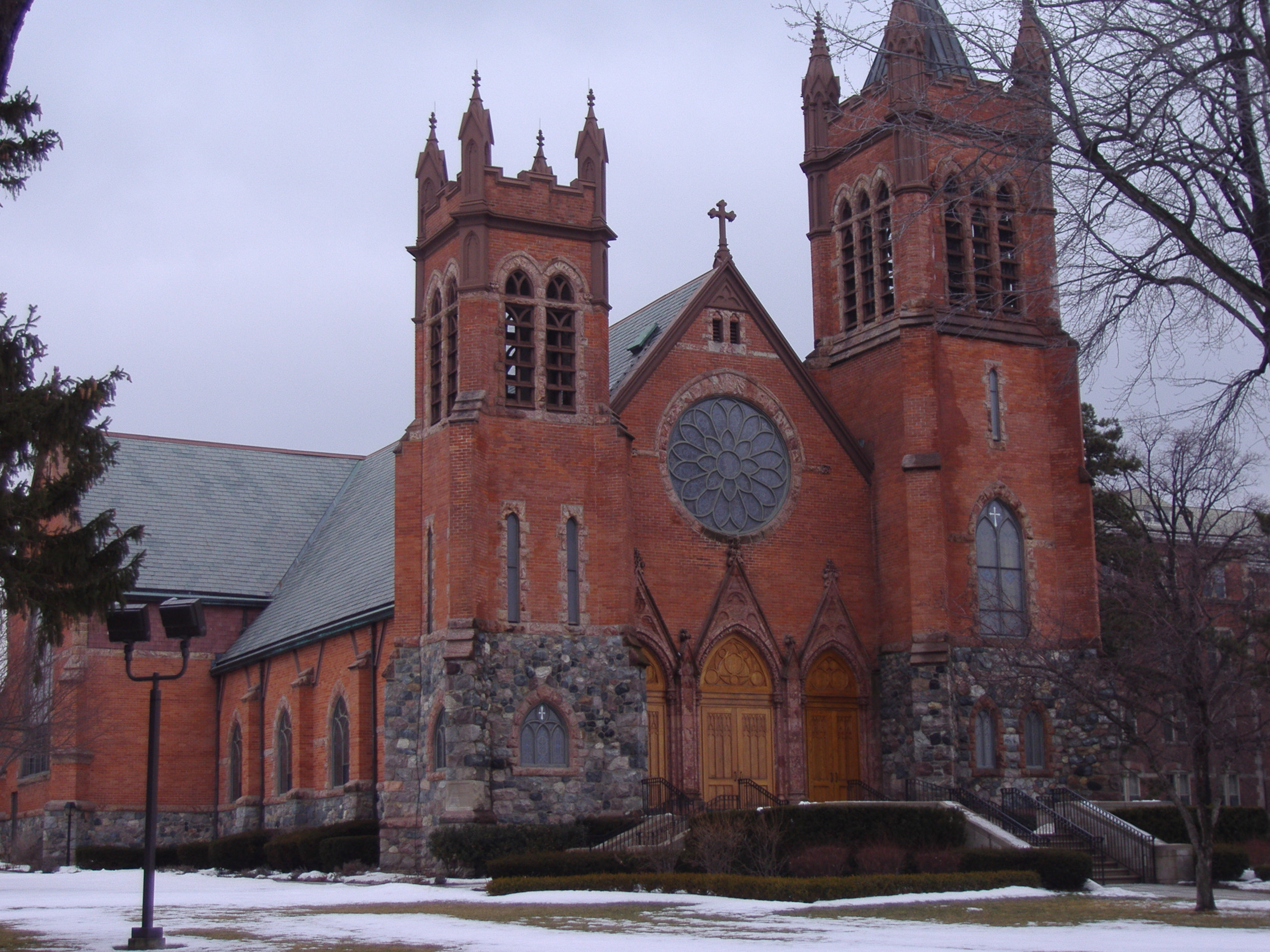
St. Paul Catholic Church

The present church building was designed by Harry J. Rill and was completed in 1899 at a cost of just over $23,000. The older frame structure was used as the parish hall until it was dismantled in 1914. The rectory was added in 1911, and the original portions of the school and convent buildings, designed by Smith, Hinchman & Grylls, were built in 1927. Additions to the school were completed in 1951 and 1953. The parish house, originally built around 1900 for former Detroit Mayor Alexander Lewis, was purchased by the parish in 1959.

The Saint Paul Catholic Church Complex sits on a long, narrow plot of land between Lake Shore Road and Grosse Pointe Boulevard. The church is constructed of brick and stone, and is designed in the French Gothic Revival style. The stained glass windows were made by Fredericks & Wolfram Art Glass Company of Detroit (installed in 1901) and Franz Mayer & Company of Munich, Germany, (installed in 1924).

== School ==
The St. Paul Church opened the school on September 6, 1927 after deciding to open the school one year earlier. The kindergarten and preschool opened in 1975 and 1993, respectively. Saint Paul's school, a private school, covers preschool to eighth grade. The school requires a tuition payment in order to enroll.

== See also ==
- Roman Catholic Archdiocese of Detroit
