= Merrill I. Mills =

American politician

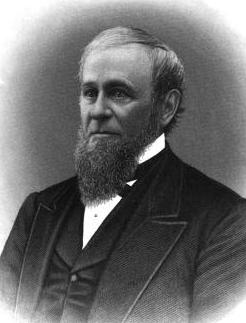

Mayor of Detroit
- In office 1866–1867
- Preceded by: Kirkland C. Barker
- Succeeded by: William W. Wheaton

Personal details
- Born: November 4, 1819 Canton, Connecticut
- Died: September 14, 1882 (aged 62) Detroit, Michigan

Merrill I. Mills (November 4, 1819 – September 14, 1882) was a businessman and mayor of Detroit.

== Biography ==
Merrill I. Mills was born on November 4, 1819, in Canton, Connecticut, the son of Isaac and Asenath Merrill Mills. Although his parents preferred he take up a professional career, Mills found he had no taste for college life, and in 1833, he joined his father's gunpowder manufacturing firm. In 1838, he moved to Alabama to represent the firm there, but in 1840 his father's health began to fail and the younger Mills moved back to Canton and take the reins of the business.

However, in 1845, Mills decided to start a new business in the west. Originally he intended to set up shop in Fort Wayne, Indiana, but the early closing of navigation in the fall forced him to lay over for some time in Detroit. Sensing an opportunity, Mills abandoned his original plan and opened a general store in Detroit. He also began trading in furs, and soon established a reputation as one of the best-known fur traders in the area. In 1850, he began manufacturing cigars, continuing and expanding the business, founding the Nevin & Mills company in 1861 and the Banner Tobacco Company in 1878. In 1867, Mills partnered with two other businessmen to open the Detroit Stove Works. In 1872 Jeremiah Dwyer started the Michigan Stove Company along with Mills and other businessmen. In addition, he was also connected with Detroit's First National Bank, Detroit Fire and Marine Insurance, Eldredge Sewing Machine Company of Chicago, and the Frankfort Furnace Company; and was president of the Transit Railway Company of Detroit.

== Politics ==
Mills was a staunch Democrat, serving as chair of the Democratic State Committee in 1856 and 1857. He spent great effort and money equipping Michigan regiments during the Civil War. He was mayor of Detroit in 1866–1867, and in 1868 ran unsuccessfully for US Congress. He served on the Detroit Board of Estimates, and in 1876 was a delegate to the Democratic National Convention.

== Personal ==
Mills married Cynthia A. Barbour. The couple had two children, Merrill B. Mills and Ella B. Mills.

Health issues forced Mills's retirement from business and politics in 1880, and Mills died on September 14, 1882, survived by his wife and two children; his son Merrill B. Mills succeeded him in running his business interests.

Political offices
Preceded by Kirkland C. Barker	Mayor of Detroit; 1866–1867	Succeeded by William W. Wheaton
