= St. James Episcopal Church (Grosse Ile, Michigan) =

Historic church in Michigan, United States

- U.S. National Register of Historic Places
- U.S. Historic district – Contributing property
- Michigan State Historic Site
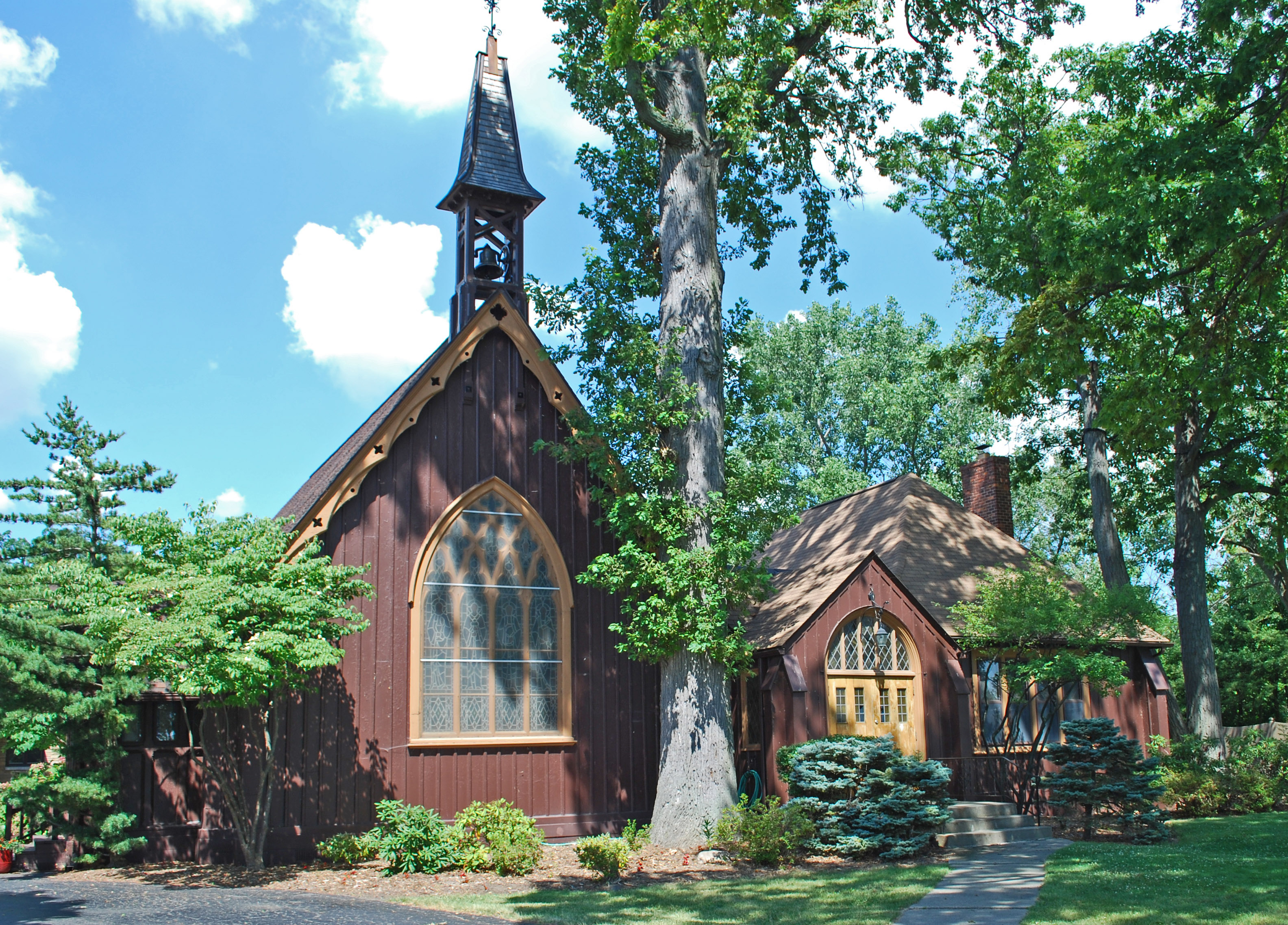
- Front of church showing Tiffany window

- Location within Michigan Location within the United States
- Interactive map
- Location: 25150 E. River Rd., Grosse Ile, Michigan
- Coordinates: 42°7′29″N 83°8′33″W
- Area: 1 acre (0.40 ha)
- Built: 1867
- Architect: Gordon W. Lloyd
- Architectural style: Carpenter Gothic
- Part of: East River Road Historic District (ID74001003)
- NRHP reference No.: 71000434

Significant dates
- Added to NRHP: November 19, 1971
- Designated MSHS: May 18, 1971

The St. James Episcopal Church is a church located at 25150 East River Road in Grosse Ile, Michigan, United States. It was listed on the National Register of Historic Places designated a Michigan State Historic Site in 1971.

== Lisette Denison Forth ==
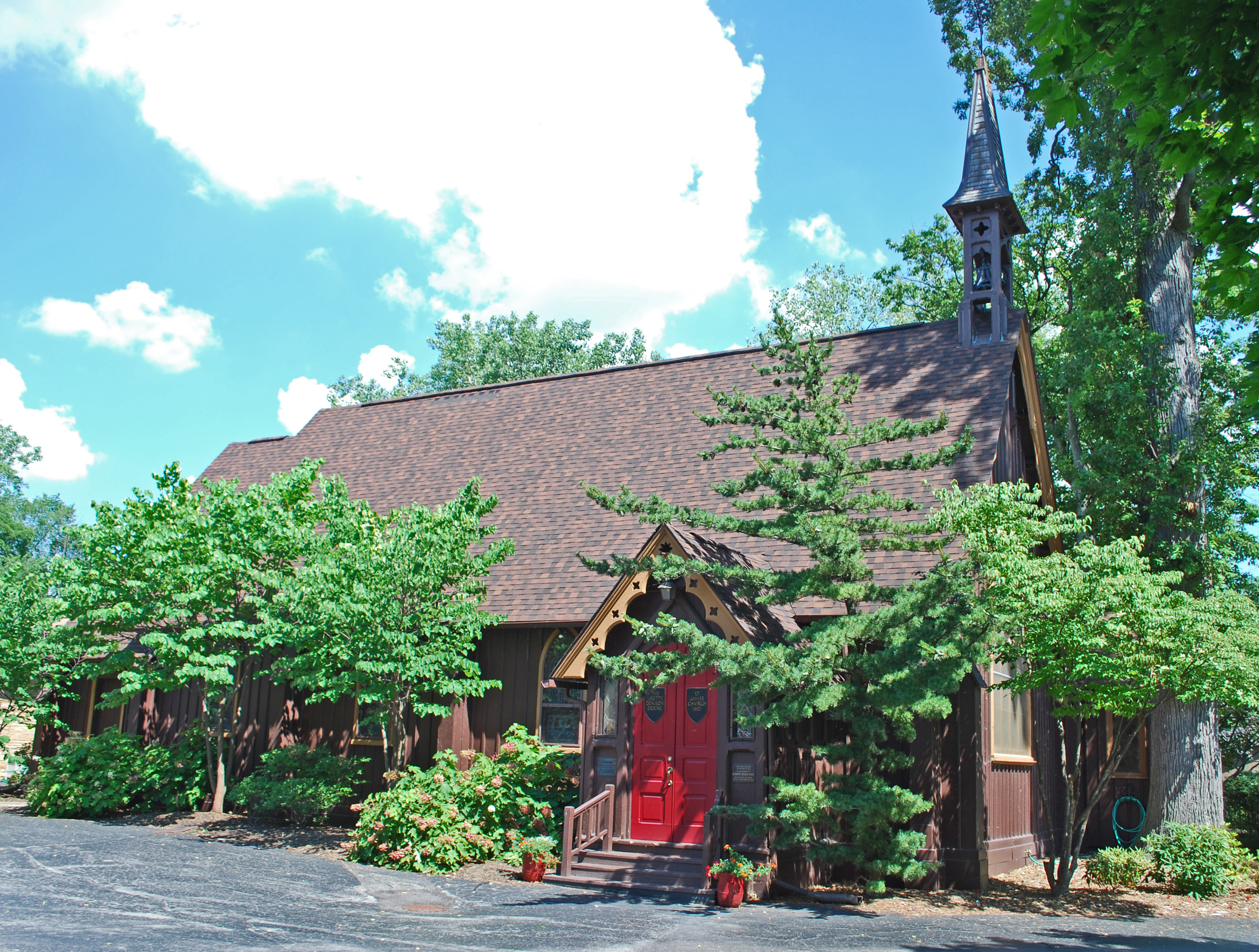
Side elevation of church, showing main entrance doors dedicated to Lisette Denison Forth

Elisabeth (Lisette) Denison Forth was born as a slave in 1786 near Detroit. Her family was owned by William and Catherine Tucker; when William Tucker died, her parents were freed, but Lisette and her brother were not. Later, following a newly established legal precedent, Lisette and her brother crossed into Canada to establish residency and gain their freedom; the two returned to Detroit in approximately 1815. In 1827, Lisette married Scipio Forth, the owner of a freight business; she was apparently widowed three years later.

In 1831, she joined the household of John Biddle, mayor of Detroit and founder of Wyandotte, Michigan. During this time, Lisette purchased land and invested her savings in business ventures, reaping a tidy profit. Lisette spent much of her time at Biddle's Wyandotte estate, eventually following the Biddles to Philadelphia in 1849 and later to Paris at the request of Biddle's wife, Eliza. In fact, Lisette had become good friends with Eliza Biddle, and the two women, both Episcopalians, made a vow to eventually build a chapel.

Lisette returned to Michigan in 1856, entering the employ of John Biddle's son, William S. Biddle, at his estate on Grosse Ile, an island "beautiful homes and large estates, many of which are occupied by descendents of the old families." She died on August 7, 1866 (shortly after Eliza Biddle's death), and is interred in Elmwood Cemetery.

== History ==
When Lisette Denison Forth died, she willed a portion of her estate to her family and the rest, some $3,000, to be used to construct a church. Although Lisette's contribution provided the bulk of the funds, William Biddle, knowing his mother's wishes, supplemented Lisette's contribution with some of his own and some of his mother's money. William's brother James donated the land for the chapel, and the two hired architect Gordon W. Lloyd to design the structure. James Biddle also built an altar cross, and a kneeling bench and reading stand for the minister. Construction began in 1867 and was completed in 1868. The first services in the church, conducted by Rev. Moses Hunter, were held in the spring of 1868.

Bishop Samuel Allen McCoskry consecrated the church in July 1868; in his later report to the diocese, he stated:

This is a very church-like building. It is another evidence of the skill and taste of Mr. Lloyd, to whom we are indebted for so many such buildings in the Diocese. This church is the fruit of a life of toil and service of a faithful colored servant of Christ. She had, for years, husbanded her earnings for this purpose, and, long before she was called away from her life of probation, had solemnly devoted them to the Church of Christ. This was done in connection with the design of one, whom she had, long and faithfully served, to unite with her in the holy act. Providential circumstances having prevented the accomplishment of the wish of this person, it was faithfully carried out by two of her sons, who liberally supplied the funds required to complete the church; and it now stands, in all its simplicity and beauty, as the joint act of a Christian household, to provide a house of prayer for the rich and poor.

In 1898, a large Tiffany glass window was installed in the church, donated by Col. John Biddle (William's son) in memory of his mother Susan. A larger church was constructed on the site in 1958, and the 1867 structure serves as a chapel for the new church. The red doors of the structure are dedicated to the memory and benevolence of Lisette Denison Forth.

== Description ==
Saint James Episcopal Church is a front-gable, Carpenter Gothic frame structure. The walls a vertical board and batten, and pierced vergeboards line the gables. The entrance is located on one side under a gable, and a frame steeple tops the church. The building has stained glass lancet windows, including the 1898 Tiffany window, Angel of Praise, which measures 11 feet by 5 feet 6 inches (3.4 m by 1.7 m). In the years since its construction, the church has undergone several repairs and had multiple additions, but the main structure remains substantially original and in excellent condition.
