= George C. Langdon =

American politician

George Curtis Langdon
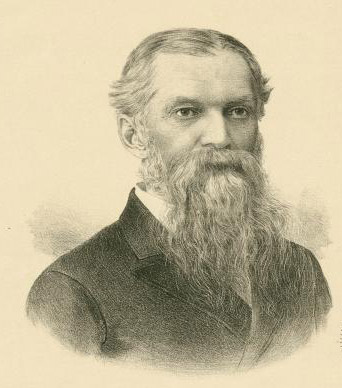

Mayor of Detroit
- In office 1878–1879
- Preceded by: Alexander Lewis
- Succeeded by: William G. Thompson

Personal details
- Born: April 9, 1833 Geneva, New York, U.S.
- Died: June 5, 1909 (aged 76) Geneva, New York, U.S.

George Curtis Langdon (April 5, 1833 – June 5, 1909) was an American politician and businessman who was the 38th mayor of Detroit, Michigan.

== Early years ==
George Curtis Langdon was born in Geneva, New York April 5, 1833, the son of A. M. Langdon. He went to school in Batavia, New York and Farmington, Connecticut, and at the age of 18 became a clerk for the wholesale firm of Lord, Warren, Slater & Co. The next year he returned to Geneva, and his father sent him to Flint, Michigan to become a farmer. After three years on the farm, Langdon moved to Detroit and entered Gregory Commercial College to study bookkeeping. He graduated with a Master in Science of Bookkeeping and Accounts degree, and began work as a bookkeeper, first for a copper smelting firm and then at a bank. From there, he went into the commission business.

== Later years ==
In 1864, Langdon and a partner purchased a brewery and began doing business under the name "Langdon and Co." In 1870 he became sole proprietor, and a few years later sold the brewery to become a maltster; his business enterprisese afforded him a comfortable fortune.

Langdon, elected as a Democrat served one term as the mayor of Detroit, from 1878 to 1879. After serving as mayor, Langdon suffered a number of setbacks which decimated his personal wealth and forced him to hire on as a clerk at the City Hall.

Langdon married Fannie Vallie in 1859; the couple had two daughters. Langdon's wife died in 1887. Their daughter, Fanny, died November 14, 1883. Langdon died on June 5, 1909, in Geneva, New York.

Political offices
Preceded by Alexander Lewis	Mayor of Detroit; 1878–1879	Succeeded by William G. Thompson
