= William W. Wheaton =

American politician

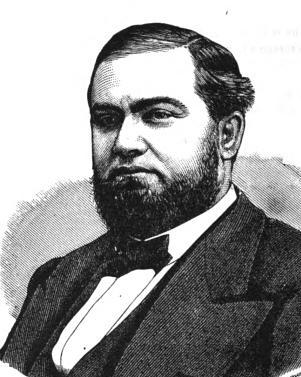

Mayor of Detroit
- In office 1868–1871
- Preceded by: Merrill I. Mills
- Succeeded by: Hugh Moffat

Personal details
- Born: April 5, 1833 New Haven, Connecticut
- Died: November 11, 1891 (aged 58) Detroit, Michigan
- Spouse: Maria Lavinia Ackerman
- Profession: Wholesale grocer

William W. Wheaton (April 5, 1833 – November 11, 1891) was a wholesale grocer, mayor of Detroit, Michigan, chair of the Michigan Democratic State Convention, and state representative.

== Biography ==
William W. Wheaton was born in New Haven, Connecticut on April 5, 1833, the son of John and Orit Johnson Wheaton. His father died in 1844, leaving the younger Wheaton to care for his mother. He attended school in New Haven and Hartford, Connecticut, and at the age of 16 began working at the wholesale establishment of Charles H. Northam & Co.

After gaining some experience at Northam & Co. and rising to the position of bookkeeper and confidential clerk, Wheaton moved to Detroit in 1853 and joined Moore, Foote, and Co., wholesale grocers. In 1855, he became the junior partner in Farrand & Wheaton, wholesale grocer and druggist, and in 1859, when Farrand & Wheaton was dissolved, he struck out on his own and formed Wheaton & Co. Over the next few years, Wheaton took on different partners, becoming Wheaton & Peek in 1862, Wheaton, Leonard, and Burr in 1863, and Wheaton & Poppleton in 1869. In 1873, he became treasurer of the Marquette & Pacific Rolling Mill Company.

In 1866, Wheaton ran for state Senate, and lost by only 12 votes. He later ran for mayor of Detroit, and was elected twice, serving two two-year terms from 1868 - 1871. He also served as chairman of the Democratic State Convention, although the nomination of Horace Greeley for president later soured him on politics. However, Wheaton returned to politics, and was elected state representative in 1889.

Wheaton married Maria Lavinia Ackerman; the couple had two daughters: Ida (born 1856) and Maria (born 1859).

William W. Wheaton died at Harper Hospital on November 11, 1891.

Political offices
Preceded by Merrill I. Mills	Mayor of Detroit; 1868–1871	Succeeded by Hugh Moffat
