= Kirkland C. Barker =

American politician (1819-1875)

Kirkland Charles Barker
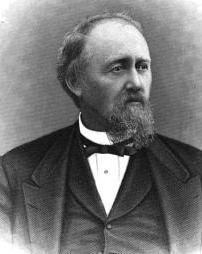

Mayor of Detroit
- In office 1864–1865
- Preceded by: William C. Duncan
- Succeeded by: Merrill I. Mills

Personal details
- Born: September 8, 1819 Schuyler, New York
- Died: May 20, 1875 (aged 55) Grosse Ile, Michigan

Kirkland Charles Barker (September 8, 1819 – May 20, 1875) was mayor of Detroit, Michigan, and established the tobacco firm of KC Barker & Company.

== Early life ==
Kirkland C. Barker was born September 8, 1819, in Schuyler, New York, the son of builder and contractor Mason Barker and his wife Elizabeth Ingham Barker. Barker was educated in the local schools, at age 14 attended a manual labor school in Whitesboro, New York, where he traded his labor for an education. After leaving school, he worked as a store clerk in Frankfort, New York, and Utica, New York. At age 18, he moved to Cleveland, Ohio, and worked in a warehouse. There, his ability at business was recognized by his employers, and he was frequently put in charge of ships bringing goods from New York.

Leaving the warehouse, Barker took a job as a travelling salesman for a tobacco company in Logansport, Indiana, but himself lived in Detroit. Barker was determined to go into business for himself, and so established a partnership with other people in Utica, and built stores in Detroit and New York, and a factory in Jersey City, New Jersey. This partnership was not successful, so Barker started anew by himself, opening KC Barker & Company (later the American Eagle Tobacco Company) in Detroit. This new firm prospered.

Barker married in 1847 to the daughter of Gilbert Bedell of Ann Arbor, Michigan; the couple had three children.

== Later life ==
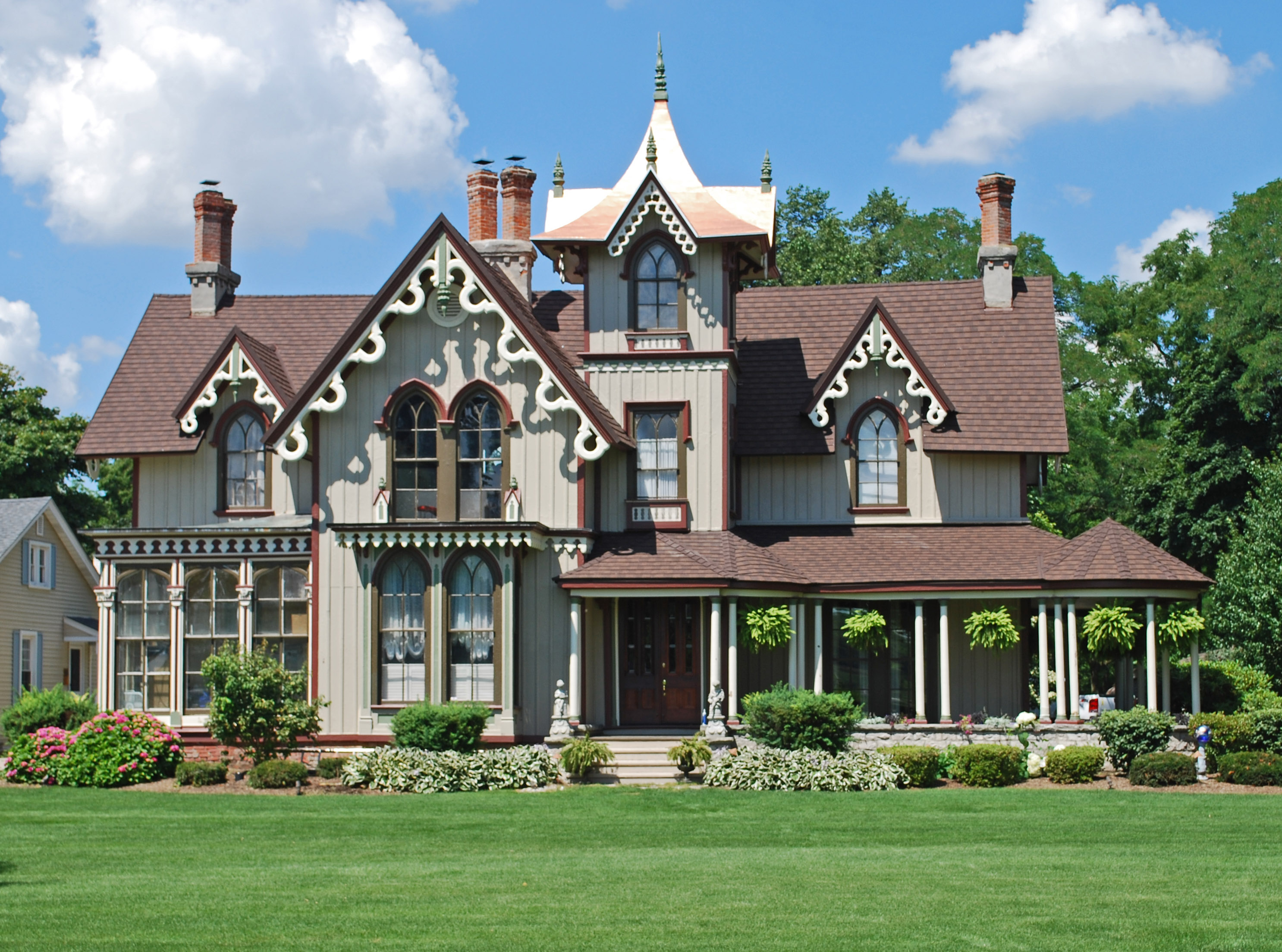
Kirkland C. Barker's house in the East River Road Historic District on Grosse Ile.

Barker dabbled in public service, serving as an alderman of Detroit in 1863 and as mayor in 1864–1865. He was also an avid sportsman, and was president of the Detroit Audubon Club. His love of the outdoors led to a close friendship with George Armstrong Custer. Barker was also the presiding officer of the Horse Association of America, and was elected Commodore of the Great Lakes Yacht Club.

During his later years, Barker took his brother, J. I. Barker, and son-in-law, Charles B. Hull, into his tobacco firm, and spent more time at his home on Grosse Ile, Michigan. Barker had purchased the "Wedding Cake House," built for Samuel Lewis on East River Road.

On May 20, 1875, he was boating near his home, had an attack of apoplexy, and drowned.

Political offices
Preceded by William C. Duncan	Mayor of Detroit; 1864–1865	Succeeded by Merrill I. Mills
