= Hugh Moffat (politician) =

American politician

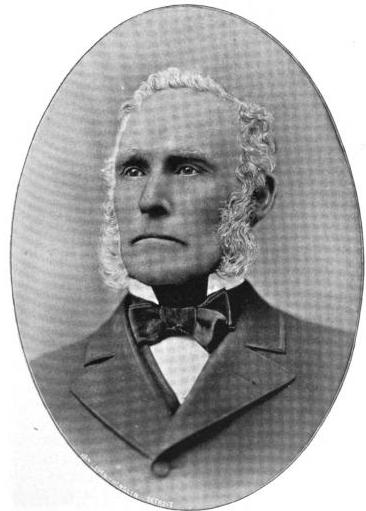

Mayor of Detroit
- In office 1872–1875
- Preceded by: William W. Wheaton
- Succeeded by: Alexander Lewis

Personal details
- Born: 1810 Coldstream, Scotland
- Died: August 6, 1884 (aged 73–74) Detroit, Michigan

Hugh Moffat (1810 – August 6, 1884) was a carpenter, lumberman, businessman, and mayor of Detroit, Michigan.

== Early life ==
Hugh Moffat was born in Coldstream, Scotland in 1810. He soon emigrated to America, settling first in Albany, New York, and in 1837 moving to Detroit. He began work as a carpenter, and built up a successful and profitable business as a builder, constructing, among other things, Mariners' Church as well as the now demolished St. Paul's Church, Biddle House, and the Moffat Block. In 1852, he expanded his business into the lumber trade by purchasing a sawmill and forested land. His lumber business was even more profitable than his carpentry had been. In 1878, Moffat took on two partners: his son Addison and Florence D. Eatherly, a "confidential employee and faithful friend."

== Politics ==
Moffat was an active member of the Fire Department, the Mechanic's Society, and president of St. Andrew's Society. In 1871, he was elected mayor of Detroit as a Republican. Moffat served two terms as mayor, with his administration notable for his vetoes of spending initiative passed by the Detroit City Council and vetoes of multiple authorizations to allow saloons to open on Sunday afternoons in Detroit. By the time he stepped down as mayor, Moffat had earned the appellation "Honest Hugh Moffat."

== Later life ==
Hugh Moffat was married three times. The first marriage, in 1836, was to Margery McLachlan. Margery died in 1856, and Moffat married her cousin, Isabella McLachlan, in 1859. Isabella died in 1869, and Moffat married Julia E. Hubbard, the sister of Thomas W. Palmer, in 1879; she died the next year.

Hugh Moffat himself died on August 6, 1884. He was survived by four children: Mrs. George MacMillan, Mrs. Edward W. Bissell, Alice E. Moffat, and William Moffat. A second son, Addison Moffat, died in 1884 shortly before his father.

== Gallery ==
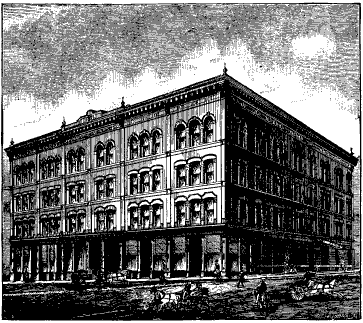
Moffat Block, built in 1871 on the SW corner of Fort and Griswold.

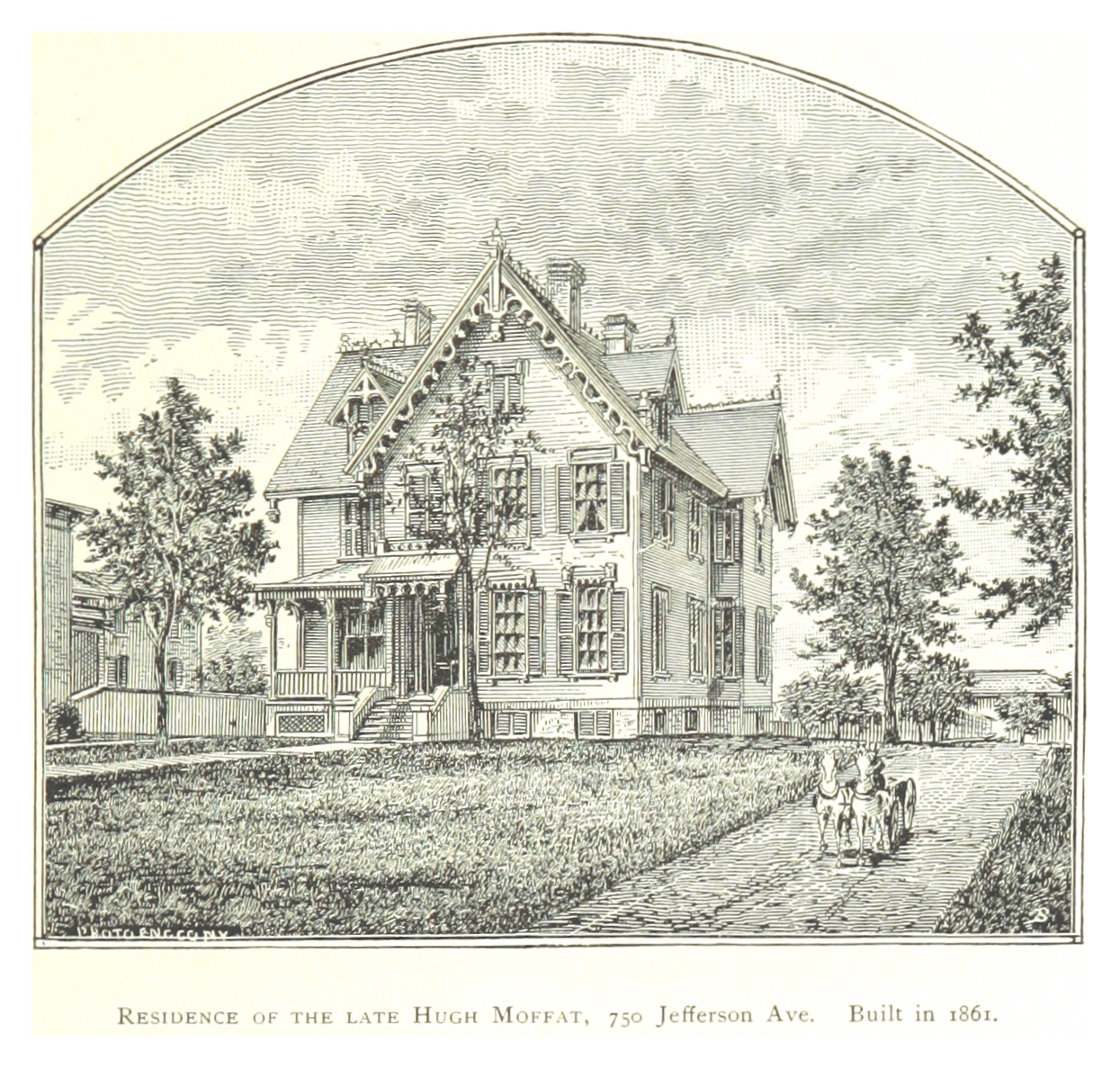
Hugh Moffat residence at 2250 East Jefferson, built in 1861 and demolished in the 1940s.

Political offices
| Preceded by William W. Wheaton | Mayor of Detroit; 1872–1875 | Succeeded by Alexander Lewis |
