= William C. Duncan =

American politician (1820-1877)

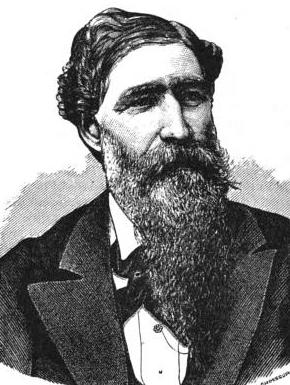

Mayor of Detroit
- In office 1862–1863
- Preceded by: Christian H. Buhl
- Succeeded by: Kirkland C. Barker

Personal details
- Born: May 18, 1820 Lyons, New York
- Died: December 19, 1877 (aged 57) Detroit, Michigan
- Party: Democratic

William Chamberlain Duncan (May 18, 1820 – December 19, 1877) was a brewer, politician, and mayor of Detroit, Michigan.

== Life and politics ==
Duncan was born in Lyons, New York on May 18, 1820. The family moved to Rochester, New York in 1825, and in 1841 Duncan began working as a steward on the passenger steamers crossing the Great Lakes. In 1846, he changed employers and began working on a steamer traveling through Lake Superior. In 1849, Duncan moved to Detroit and became a brewer.

Duncan was a Democrat, and in 1852, he was elected an alderman, serving five years. He was first council president, after a revision of the city charter created that position. He was mayor of Detroit for two years, 1862 and 1863, and in the fall of 1863 was elected as a Democrat to the Michigan State Senate, where he represented the 2nd district. He began in the banking business in 1865, but soon gave up the trade due to impaired health and to take care of the property he had accumulated and to visit Europe.

In 1873, however, Duncan was chosen as a member of the newly created Board of Estimates. In the same year, the city Democratic Party asked him to again be their candidate for mayor, but Duncan declined due to his ill-health.

William C. Duncan married Emma J. Hammer who died in 1863. They had a son, Frank C. Duncan, and a daughter, Kate Mary Emma Duncan. After the death of his wife, he married Sara Elizabeth Heath.

William C. Duncan died on December 19, 1877.

Political offices
Preceded by Christian H. Buhl	Mayor of Detroit; 1862–1863	Succeeded by Kirkland C. Barker
