= William G. Thompson =

Union Army officer and mayor of Detroit, Michigan

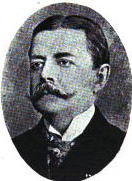

Mayor of Detroit
- In office 1880–1883
- Preceded by: George C. Langdon
- Succeeded by: Stephen Benedict Grummond

Personal details
- Born: July 23, 1842 Lancaster, Pennsylvania, US
- Died: July 20, 1904 (aged 61) Yonkers, New York, US
- Spouse(s): Adelaide Mary Brush; Adele Campau

William Gillon Thompson (July 23, 1842 – July 20, 1904) was an American politician, lawyer and Union Army officer who was the mayor of Detroit from 1880 to 1883. He founded Detroit's first major league baseball team, Detroit Wolverines.

== Early life ==
William G. Thompson was born in Lancaster, Pennsylvania, on July 23, 1842. He was educated at Amherst College. In 1861, sparked to enlist by the Civil War, he joined the Fourth Pennsylvania Cavalry. When his enlistment was over, he moved at the request of his mother to Toledo, Ohio, but then enlisted in a lancer regiment there as a first lieutenant. He spent the winter of 1861–1862 in Detroit, after which the regiment was disbanded and Thompson returned to Lancaster. He was later appointed aide de camp as a second lieutenant in the 6th New Jersey Volunteer Infantry, and was severely wounded at the Battle of Chancellorsville, earning a promotion to first lieutenant for gallantry on the battlefield.

Thompson was a companion of the Michigan Commandery of the Military Order of the Loyal Legion of the United States, a military society of officers who served in the Union armed forces and their descendants.

== Law and politics ==
After his unit was mustered out in 1864, Thompson studied law in New York City, then moved to Detroit to join the law firm of D. B. and Henry M. Duffield. He was admitted to the bar in 1867. He had varied business interests, building the Ste. Claire Hotel on Campus Martius in 1879 and founding Detroit's first major league baseball team, the Detroit Wolverines, in 1881.

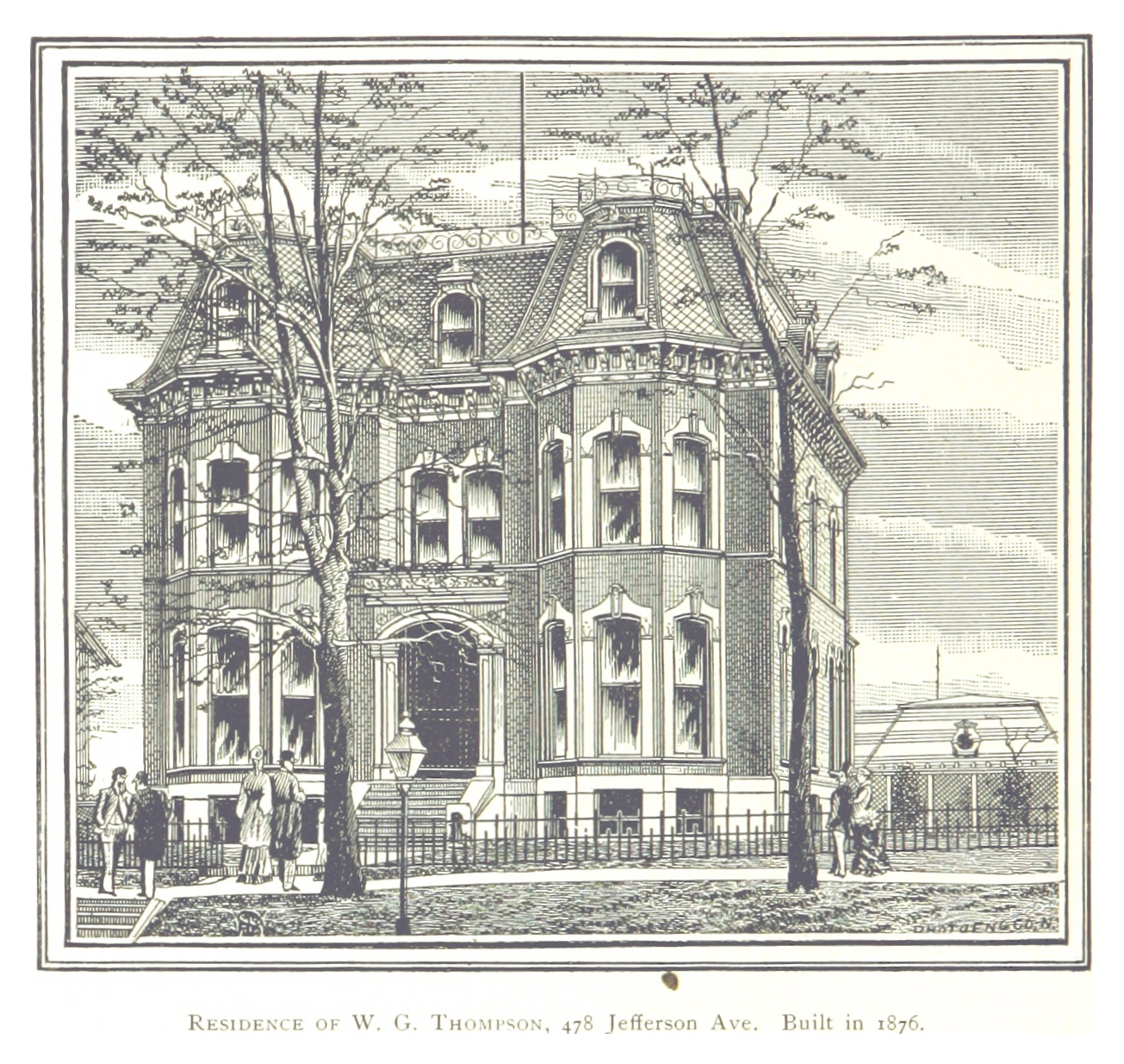
William G Thompson residence in 1360 East Jefferson, was built in 1876 and demolished in 1919.

Thompson served on the Board of Estimates in 1873, and as an alderman in 1874–1875. He unsuccessfully ran for mayor in 1876, and was a delegate to the Republican National Convention from Michigan in both 1876 and 1880. He ran for mayor of Detroit on the Republican ticket twice more, winning both times and serving from 1880 to 1883. In 1884, Thompson switched parties to become a Democrat and sought that party's nomination for mayor, but was not nominated. He ran once more for mayor in 1891, being defeated by the then-incumbent Hazen S. Pingree. He also served as a state senator, being elected in 1894.

== Personal and later life ==
In 1867, Thompson married Adelaide Mary Brush, the daughter of Edmund A. Brush and granddaughter of Elijah Brush. The couple had one daughter, and Adelaide died in 1875. In 1878, Thompson married Adele Campau (1856-1930), granddaughter of former Detroit mayor Joseph Campau, but the two began divorce proceedings in 1888. The couple's acrimony caused a sensational and public fight between Thompson and Adele's brother Daniel Campau, in which Thompson was considerably pummeled. Campau had warned Thompson just prior to the fight that "he must not talk about his wife hereafter in barrooms and other public places, as he had been doing."

Thompson died on July 20, 1904, in Yonkers, New York, of injuries received after being knocked down by a bicycle.

Political offices
| Preceded by George C. Langdon | Mayor of Detroit; 1880–1883 | Succeeded by Stephen Benedict Grummond |
