= Alexander Lewis (mayor) =

American politician

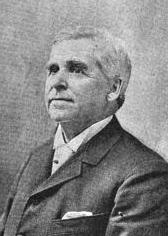

Mayor of Detroit
- In office 1876–1877
- Preceded by: Hugh Moffat
- Succeeded by: George C. Langdon

Personal details
- Born: October 4, 1822 Windsor, Ontario
- Died: April 18, 1908 (aged 85) Detroit, Michigan
- Spouse: Elizabeth J. Ingersoll
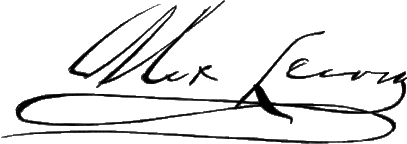
- Signature

Alexander Lewis (October 4, 1822 – April 18, 1908) was an American politician and businessman who was the mayor of Detroit from 1876 to 1877. He ran one of the largest flour and grain businesses in the city.

== Early life ==
Alexander Lewis was born on October 4, 1822, in Windsor, Ontario (then called "Sandwich"), the son of Thomas and Jeanette Velaire Lewis. He came to Detroit on May 1, 1837, to work as a clerk at E. W. Cole & Co. He remained at E. W. Cole & Co. for two years, then spent two years at the druggists G. & J. G. Hill, and then moved to Pontiac, Michigan. Lewis returned to Detroit in 1843 to start a forwarding and commission service with his brother Samuel and Horace Gray. In 1845, Lewis started another forwarding and commission service with H. P. Bridge under the name of Bridge & Lewis.

== Business and politics ==
Lewis remained with Bridge & Lewis until 1862, when he established a flour and grain business. This he built into one of the largest and most prosperous enterprises in the city. Lewis retired in 1884 to look after his various property interests and real estate. Lewis was also a director of the Detroit Fire & Marine Insurance Company, a director of the Detroit National Bank, president of Detroit Gas Light Company, and in 1862 president of the Detroit Board of Trade.

Lewis served as Police Commissioner from 1865 to 1875 and was elected mayor of Detroit in 1876 as a Democrat. He was also a member of the Detroit Library Board of Commissioners from 1881 to 1888, and, with Thomas W. Palmer, established the Michigan Society for the Prevention of Cruelty to Animals.

== Family and later life ==
Lewis married Elizabeth J. Ingersoll in 1850; the couple had 13 children, of which 8 lived into the 1890s: Ida Frances (Lewis) Healy, Edward L. Lewis, Josephine (Lewis) Carpenter, Hattie I. (Lewis) Currie, Harry B. Lewis, Julia Velaire (McMillan) Penrose, Marion Marie (Lewis) Muir, and Alexander Ingersoll Lewis. Through his daughter Julia, Alexander is the great-great-grandfather of Baroness Sybille de Selys Longchamps, the mother of Princess Delphine of Belgium (Delphine Michèle Anne Marie Ghislaine de Saxe-Cobourg; born 22 February 1968), known previously as Jonkvrouw Delphine Boël, who is a Belgian artist and member of the Belgian royal family. She is the daughter of King Albert II of Belgium with de Selys Longchamps, and the half-sister of King Philippe of Belgium.

Around 1900, Lewis built a home in Grosse Pointe Farms, Michigan, which is now the parish house for the Saint Paul Catholic Church. The complex was designated a Michigan State Historic Site in 1992. Alexander Lewis died on April 18, 1908.

Political offices
Preceded by Hugh Moffat	Mayor of Detroit; 1876–1877	Succeeded by George C. Langdon
