= Samuel T. Douglass =

American judge

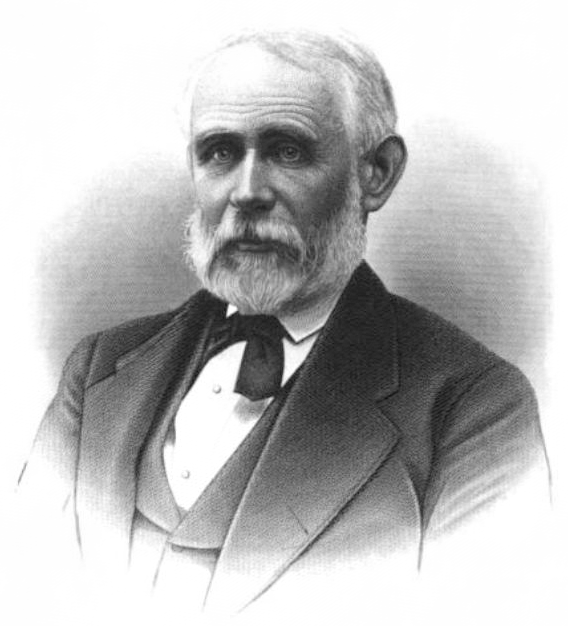

Justice of the Michigan Supreme Court
- In office 1851–1857

Personal details
- Born: February 28, 1814 Wallingford, Vermont, US
- Died: March 5, 1898 (aged 84) Grosse Ile, Michigan, US
- Spouse: Elizabeth Campbell (m. 1856)
- Education: Fredonia Academy
- Occupation: Jurist

Samuel T. Douglass (February 28, 1814 – March 5, 1898) was an American lawyer and jurist. He served as a justice of the Michigan Supreme Court.

== Early life and education ==
Douglass was born in Wallingford, Vermont, on February 28, 1814. His family moved to Fredonia, New York, and Douglass was educated at Fredonia Academy there. He studied law in the office of James Mullet (who was judge of the Supreme Court of New York).

== Career ==
Douglas came to Detroit in 1837, and was admitted to the bar the same year. With the exception for a brief time in Ann Arbor, Douglass spent the next fifty years in Detroit as a practicing lawyer and judge. In 1849, Douglass became law partners with James V. Campbell, also later a justice of the Michigan Supreme Court. He married Campbell's sister, Elizabeth, in 1856.

In 1845, Douglass was appointed reporter of decisions of the Michigan Supreme Court; he served in that position until resigning in 1849. Douglass was reporter when the first two volumes of the Michigan Reports were published, covering 1843 to 1847. Douglass served as judge of the Wayne County Circuit Court and the Michigan Supreme Court from 1851 until 1857.

A separate Michigan Supreme Court was created in 1857, and Douglass was nominated for justice by the Democratic Party. The Democrats were an extreme minority in the Michigan Legislature at the time, however, and James V. Campbell, Douglass' former law partner and brother-in-law, was appointed instead. In May 1857, Douglass resigned the circuit judgeship and returned to private practice.

Douglass was a lover of nature and an amateur naturalist. In 1860 he built a home and farm on Grosse Ile in the Detroit River. Douglass took part in several trips to explore the Upper Peninsula of Michigan at a time when the area remained remote and almost entirely unsettled.

Douglass died at his home on Grosse Ile on the afternoon of March 5, 1898.
